= List of prime ministers of Eswatini =

Prime Minister of the Kingdom of Eswatini
- Ndvunankulu (Swazi)
- Coat of arms of Eswatini

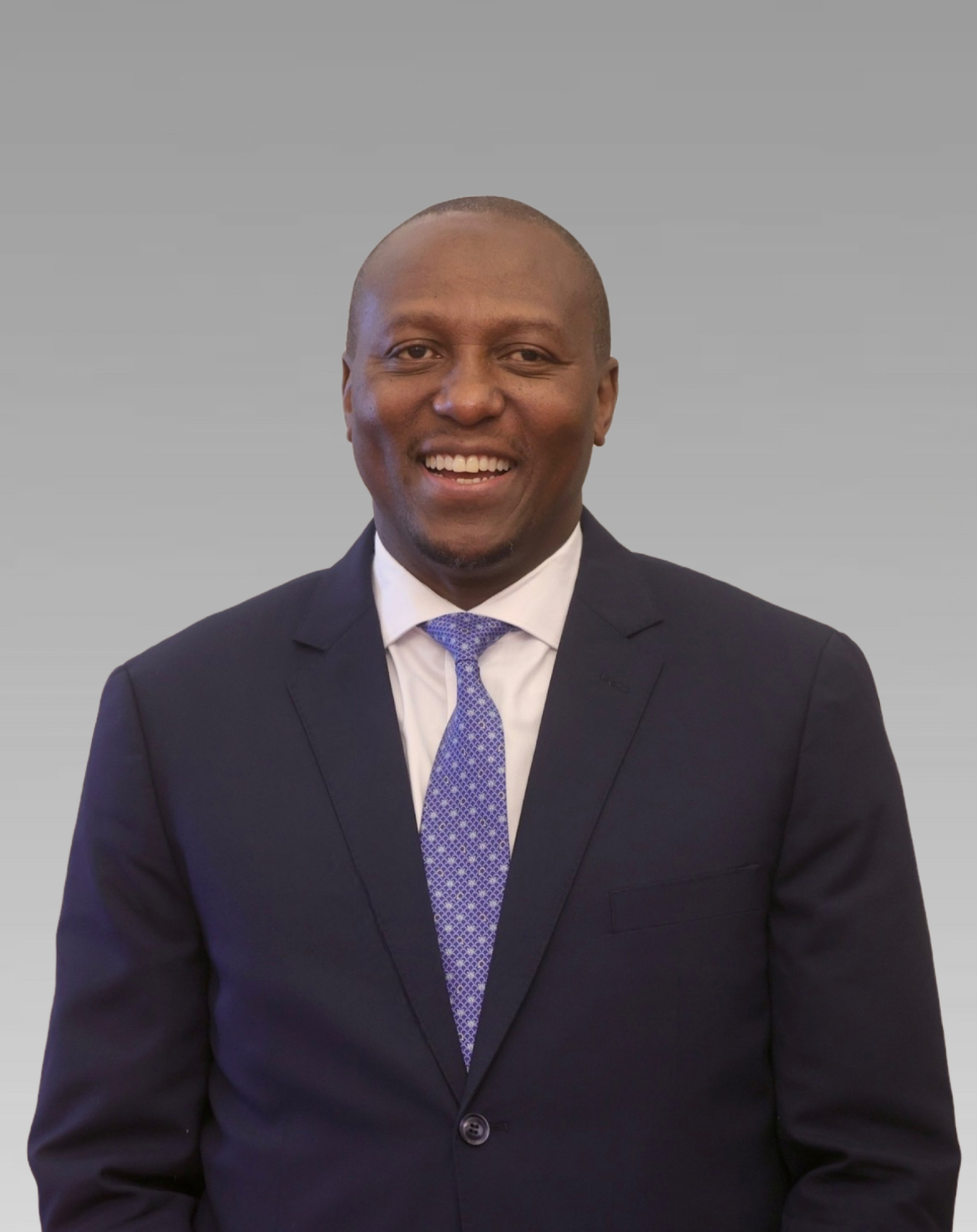
- Incumbent; Russell Dlamini since 4 November 2023
- Style: His Excellency
- Residence: State House, Lobamba
- Appointer: King of Eswatini
- Formation: 16 May 1967; 59 years ago
- First holder: Makhosini Dlamini
- Salary: L926,370 annually
- Website: Official website

This is a list of prime ministers of Eswatini (Swazi: Ndvunankulu) since the formation of the post in 1967.

Twelve people have been Prime Minister of Eswatini, plus eight acting prime ministers. One person, Barnabas Sibusiso Dlamini, held two non-consecutive terms.

The current prime minister is Russell Dlamini, since 4 November 2023. He was appointed by King Mswati III at the Ludzidzini Royal Village.

== List of officeholders ==
Political parties

Imbokodvo National Movement (INM)

Other affiliations

Independent

Status

Acting prime minister

Symbols

^{†} Died in office

| No. | Portrait | Name (Birth–Death) | Term of office | | | Political party | Elected | Government | Monarch(s) (Reign) | Ref. |
| No. | Portrait | Name (Birth–Death) | Took office | Left office | Time in office | Political party | Elected | Government | Monarch(s) (Reign) | Ref. |
|---|---|---|---|---|---|---|---|---|---|---|
| 1 | | Makhosini Dlamini (1914–1978) | 16 May 1967 | 31 March 1976 | 8 years, 320 days | INM (until 1973) | 1967 | Makhosini I | Sobhuza II (1899–1982) | |
| 1 | | Makhosini Dlamini (1914–1978) | 16 May 1967 | 31 March 1976 | 8 years, 320 days | Independent | 1972 | Makhosini II | Sobhuza II (1899–1982) | |
| 2 | | Maphevu Dlamini (1922–1979) | 31 March 1976 | 25 October 1979^{[†]} | 3 years, 208 days | Independent | — | Maphevu | Sobhuza II (1899–1982) | |
| 2 | | Maphevu Dlamini (1922–1979) | 31 March 1976 | 25 October 1979^{[†]} | 3 years, 208 days | Independent | 1978 | Maphevu | Sobhuza II (1899–1982) | |
| — | | Ben Nsibandze (1931–2021) acting | 25 October 1979 | 23 November 1979 | 29 days | Independent | — | Maphevu | Sobhuza II (1899–1982) | |
| 3 | | Mabandla Dlamini (1930–2025) | 23 November 1979 | 25 March 1983 | 3 years, 122 days | Independent | — | Mabandla | Sobhuza II (1899–1982) | |
| 3 | | Mabandla Dlamini (1930–2025) | 23 November 1979 | 25 March 1983 | 3 years, 122 days | Independent | — | Mabandla | Interregnum | |
| 4 | | Bhekimpi Dlamini (1924–1999) | 25 March 1983 | 6 October 1986 | 3 years, 195 days | Independent | 1983 | Bhekimpi | Interregnum | |
| 4 | | Bhekimpi Dlamini (1924–1999) | 25 March 1983 | 6 October 1986 | 3 years, 195 days | Independent | 1983 | Bhekimpi | Mswati III (since 1986) | |
| 5 | | Sotsha Dlamini (1940–2017) | 6 October 1986 | 12 July 1989 | 2 years, 279 days | Independent | — | Sotsha | Mswati III (since 1986) | |
| 5 | | Sotsha Dlamini (1940–2017) | 6 October 1986 | 12 July 1989 | 2 years, 279 days | Independent | 1987 | Sotsha | Mswati III (since 1986) | |
| 6 | | Obed Dlamini (1937–2017) | 12 July 1989 | 25 October 1993 | 4 years, 105 days | Independent | — | Obed | Mswati III (since 1986) | |
| — | | Andreas Fakudze (died 2013) acting | 25 October 1993 | 4 November 1993 | 10 days | Independent | — | Obed | Mswati III (since 1986) | |
| 7 | | Jameson Mbilini Dlamini (1921–2008) | 4 November 1993 | 8 May 1996 | 2 years, 186 days | Independent | 1993 | Jameson Mbilini | Mswati III (since 1986) | |
| — | | Sishayi Nxumalo (1936–2000) acting | 8 May 1996 | 26 July 1996 | 79 days | Independent | — | Jameson Mbilini | Mswati III (since 1986) | |
| 8 | | Barnabas Sibusiso Dlamini (1942–2018) | 26 July 1996 | 29 September 2003 | 7 years, 65 days | Independent | — | Barnabas Sibusiso I | Mswati III (since 1986) | |
| 8 | | Barnabas Sibusiso Dlamini (1942–2018) | 26 July 1996 | 29 September 2003 | 7 years, 65 days | Independent | 1998 | Barnabas Sibusiso I | Mswati III (since 1986) | |
| — | | Paul Shabangu (1943–2024) acting | 29 September 2003 | 6 November 2003 | 38 days | Independent | — | Barnabas Sibusiso | Mswati III (since 1986) | |
| 9 | | Themba Dlamini (born 1950) | 6 November 2003 | 18 September 2008 | 4 years, 317 days | Independent | 2003 | Themba | Mswati III (since 1986) | |
| — | | Bheki Dlamini acting | 18 September 2008 | 23 October 2008 | 35 days | Independent | — | Themba | Mswati III (since 1986) | |
| (8) | | Barnabas Sibusiso Dlamini (1942–2018) | 23 October 2008 | 5 September 2018 | 9 years, 317 days | Independent | 2008 | Barnabas Sibusiso II | Mswati III (since 1986) | |
| (8) | | Barnabas Sibusiso Dlamini (1942–2018) | 23 October 2008 | 5 September 2018 | 9 years, 317 days | Independent | 2013 | Barnabas Sibusiso III | Mswati III (since 1986) | |
| — | | Vincent Mhlanga (died 2020) acting | 5 September 2018 | 27 October 2018 | 52 days | Independent | — | Barnabas Sibusiso III | Mswati III (since 1986) | |
| 10 | | Ambrose Mandvulo Dlamini (1968–2020) | 27 October 2018 | 13 December 2020^{[†]} | 2 years, 47 days | Independent | 2018 | Ambrose Mandvulo | Mswati III (since 1986) | |
| — | | Themba Masuku (born 1950) acting | 13 December 2020 | 19 July 2021 | 218 days | Independent | — | Ambrose Mandvulo | Mswati III (since 1986) | |
| 11 | | Cleopas Dlamini (born 1952) | 19 July 2021 | 28 September 2023 | 2 years, 71 days | Independent | — | Cleopas | Mswati III (since 1986) | |
| — | | Mgwagwa Gamedze (born 19–) acting | 28 September 2023 | 4 November 2023 | 37 days | Independent | — | Cleopas | Mswati III (since 1986) | |
| 12 | | Russell Dlamini (born 1973) | 4 November 2023 | Incumbent | 2 years, 307 days | Independent | 2023 | Russell | Mswati III (since 1986) | |

== See also ==
- Politics of Eswatini
- History of Eswatini
- List of monarchs of Eswatini
