= 2007 Swazi general strike =

- Date: July 25, 2007
- Location: Manzini and Mbabane, Eswatini
- Goals: Multi-party elections; Constitutional monarchy
- Methods: Strike action; Marches

Parties
Swaziland Federation of Trade Unions (SFTU); Swaziland Federation of Labour (SFL); Swaziland National Association of Teachers (SNAT)	Government of Eswatini

Lead figures
Jan Sithole, secretary-general of the SFTU; Vincent Ncongwane, head of the SFL	

The 2007 Swazi general strike started on 25 July, 2007, and lasted 2 days. The strike was led by a coalition between the Swaziland Federation of Trade Unions (SFTU), the Swaziland Federation of Labour (SFL), and the Swaziland National Association of Teachers (SNAT). They planned to stage a two-hour full stoppage of public life every month until the incumbent absolute monarch Mswati III gave in to their demands: multi-party elections, that there be a reduction of taxes on workers, and an end to absolute monarchy in Eswatini.

Over the two-day strike, tens of thousands of villagers from around the country converged on Manzini and Mbabane to march for democratic reform. Isolated instances of violence and looting were met with riot police and water cannons.

== Background ==
Over the course of the two decades leading up to the 2007 general strike, pro-democracy movements found success across southern Africa. Mozambique, Namibia, and South Africa all saw the establishment of democratic governance.

Eswatini is an impoverished country. With a population of around 1 million, 70% of the general population lives in extreme poverty. At the time, the region was facing an unemployment rate of 70%. Further, Eswatini has the world's highest rate of HIV/AIDS conditions.

The last mass-scale demonstration in Eswatini prior to the 2007 general strike was the 1996 Swazi general strike, which occurred over two months and led to food shortages in the region.

=== Government of Eswatini ===
A former British colony, the government of Eswatini has a king, a parliament (elected in part by the people), and a constitution, however, the king retains full executive, legislative, and judicial powers. The king appoints the prime minister and 10 of the 65 members of parliament. As a part of their powers, the king may veto any law passed by the parliament.

A key criticism of the 2006 constitution was that it largely maintained the status quo of Swazi politics.

=== Grievances ===
The core demand of the 2007 Swazi general strike was that the 2008 Swazi general election be held under a multiparty system. Relatedly, workers demanded an end to absolute monarchy in Eswatini.

In a statement, SFTU general-secretary Jan Sithole said:

If one looks back to the early 1970s when the country was under a multiparty system, there was economic growth that was one of the best in the region. But immediately when political parties were banned in 1973 our economy took a nosedive, so it is up to the Swazi workers to change the system that has been a stumbling block in economic development.

The unions were advancing demands concerning labour as well, including lower taxation and improved retirement packages for workers.

== Strike ==
The first two-day stoppage occurred on 25 July in Manzini and on 26 July in Mbabane, when tens of thousands of workers demonstrated on the streets. The demonstrations constituted Swaziland's biggest civil movement for over a decade, since the last large-scale protests in 1996.

The state responded to the strike with riot police and water cannons following isolated acts of violence and looting on 25 July. As villagers traveled to Mbabane on the second day of protests, riot police searched their bags in an attempt to quell potential violent outbreaks. One protester was detained by police for "violent acts" and two shops were reported to have been looted in Mbabane. Shops on Mbabane's main street closed preemptively for fear of looting.

During the strike, hospitals and banks continued to operate with minimal staff while schools and government factories closed due to high participation in the strike. In Mbabane, virtually all economic activity stopped on 26 July.

== Reactions ==
Government spokespersons denied the unions' and strikers' claims, stating that they should not demonstrate, but rather lobby the parliament, as only parliament has the power to change the constitution to allow multi-party elections. The government claimed they were unfazed albeit surprised by the strikes, which they argue are not comparable to the 1996 general strike.

A statement from the CEO of the Federation of Swaziland Employers and Chamber of Commerce put blame for the protests and the hit the Swazi economy would take on the government for its inaction and apparent lack of desire to address concerns.

== Further actions ==
On 2 August 2007, union representatives threatened further strikes if the government was not willing to listen, and raised labour issues in addition to their political demands.

Following the two-day strike, the unions sought to use the courts to impose external mediation on the conflict. Vincent Ncongwane, the head of SFL, motivated the court case by saying that a regulated mediator would not try to shift the goalpost, which is an issue union negotiators noted when they were working directly with the government.
