= Government of Eswatini =

Central government of the Kingdom of Eswatini

Government of the Kingdom of Eswatini
- Central government

Overview
- Established: 6 September 1968; 57 years ago
- State: Eswatini
- Leader: Ngwenyama (King of Eswatini) (Mswati III) Prime Ministers of Eswatini (Russell Dlamini)
- Website: www.gov.sz

Government of the Kingdom of Eswatini is the union government created by the constitution of Eswatini where the monarch holds supreme executive, legislative, and judicial powers. The Ngwenyama (lion) is a hereditary leader, rules the country, with the assistance of a council of ministers and a national legislature.

== Executive branch ==
Main office holders
Office	Name	Since
Ngwenyama (King of Eswatini)	Mswati III	25 April 1986
Prime Minister	Russell Dlamini	4 November 2023

In general practice, however, the monarch's power is delegated through a dualistic system: modern and statutory bodies, like the cabinet, and less formal traditional government structures. At present, parliament consists of an 82-seat House of Assembly. 55 members are elected through popular vote; the Attorney General as an ex-officio member; 10 are appointed by the king and 4 women elected from each one of the administrative regions. There is also a 30-seat Senate, where 10 members are appointed by the House of Assembly, and 20 are appointed by the king, whom at least the half must be women.

The king must approve legislation passed by parliament before it becomes law. The prime minister, who is head of government is appointed by the king from among the members of the House on recommendations of the King's Advisory Council. The cabinet, which is recommended by the prime minister and approved by the king, exercises executive authority.

=== Head of government ===
The head of government is the prime minister, who is appointed by the king after the election of a new parliament. The prime minister is a member of parliament and serves a five-year term. The prime minister cannot serve more than two consecutive terms. As a head of government, he chairs the cabinet meetings. Themba N. Masuku served as acting prime minister since the death of Ambrose Mandvulo Dlamini on 13 December 2020 until 19 July 2020. Mswati III announced that Cleopas Dlamini would be the new Prime Minister.

=== Cabinet government ===
The cabinet of the Eswatini government is appointed by the king on advice from the prime minister. The members of the cabinet must be members of either Houses of parliament. The members of the cabinet are known as ministers, and they head government departments called ministries. They head their respective portfolios until the end of the parliament's term, or unless there is a cabinet reshuffle, dismissal, or death.

== Legislative branch ==
The Swazi bicameral Parliament or Libandla consists of the Senate (30 seats; 10 members appointed by the House of Assembly and 20 appointed by the monarch; to serve five-year terms) and the House of Assembly (65 seats; 10 members appointed by the monarch and 55 elected by popular vote; to serve five-year terms). The elections are held every five years after dissolution of parliament by the King. The last elections were held on 20 September 2013. The balloting is done on a non-party basis in all categories. All election procedures are overseen by the elections and boundaries commission.

=== Election procedure ===
Nominations take place at the constituencies. On the day of nomination, the name of the nominee is raised by a show of hands. Nominees are given an opportunity to indicate acceptance or declining of the nomination. Nominees must be supported by at least ten members of that constituency. The nominations are for the position of Member of Parliament, Constituency Headman (Indvuna) and the Constituency Executive Committee (Bucopho). The minimum number of nominees is 4 and the maximum is 10.

Primary elections also take place at the constituency level. They are by secret ballot. During the Primary Elections, the voters are given an opportunity to elect the member of the executive committee (Bucopho) for that particular constituency. Aspiring Members of Parliament and the constituency Headman are also elected from each constituency. The secondary and final elections take place at the various constituencies called Tinkhundla. Candidates who won primary elections in the chiefdoms are considered nominees for the secondary elections at inkhundla or constituency level. The nominees with majority votes become the winners and they become members of parliament or constituency headman.

== Constitution of Eswatini ==
The 2005 constitution is currently in force. The constitution of 6 September 1968 was suspended 12 April 1973 by a State of Emergency decree imposed by King Sobhuza II, the father of the current King Mswati III. The decree gave absolute power to the monarchy and banned organised political opposition to royal rule.

A new constitution was promulgated 13 October 1978, but was not formally presented to the people.

In 2001 King Mswati III appointed a committee to draft a new constitution.

== Administrative divisions ==
For local administration Eswatini is divided into 4 regions (Hhohho, Lubombo, Manzini, Shiselweni), each with an administrator appointed by the king. Parallel to the government structure is the traditional system consisting of the king and his advisers, traditional courts, and 59 tinkhundla (subregional districts in which traditional chiefs are grouped).

== Foreign relations ==
Eswatini is a member of the Southern African Customs Union (SACU) which the U.S. began negotiating a Free Trade Agreement with in May 2003. The other members of SACU are Botswana, Namibia, Lesotho and South Africa.

Eswatini is also a member of ACP, AfDB, C, ECA, FAO, G-77, IBRD, ICAO, ICFTU, ICRM, IDA, IFAD, IFC, IFRCS, ILO, IMF, Interpol, IOC, ISO (correspondent), ITU, NAM, OAU, OPCW, PCA, SACU, SADC, UN, UNCTAD, UNESCO, UNIDO, UPU, WCO, WHO, WIPO, WMO, WToO, and the WTrO.
