= 1967 Swazi general election =

- 19–20 April 1967
- All 24 seats in the House of Assembly; 13 seats needed for a majority
Party	Leader	Vote %	Seats	+/–
INM	Makhosini Dlamini	79.34	24	+15
This lists parties that won seats. See the complete results below.
Prime Minister before	Prime Minister after
Office established	Makhosini Dlamini; INM

General elections were held in Swaziland on 19 and 20 April 1967 to elect members of the House of Assembly. The result was a second successive victory for the royalist Imbokodvo National Movement, which won 79.4% of the vote and all 24 seats.

== Electoral system ==
Unlike the previous election in which there were two voter rolls for black and white voters, the election was held with a single voter roll, with each voter having three votes.

== Results ==
Party	Votes	%	Seats	+/–
Imbokodvo National Movement	191,160	79.34	24	+15
Ngwane National Liberatory Congress	48,744	20.23	0	0
Swaziland United Front	681	0.28	0	New
Swaziland Progressive Party	356	0.15	0	0
Total	240,941	100.00	24	0
Registered voters/turnout	106,121	–		
Source: Nohlen et al., Sternberger et al.
