= List of political parties in Eswatini =

This article lists political parties in Eswatini. The status of political parties in Eswatini is not clearly defined.

== Current parties ==
- African United Democratic Party (AUDP)
- Communist Party of Swaziland (CPS)
- Economic Freedom Fighters of Swaziland (EFF)
- Inhlava Party (previously Inhlava Forum)
- Ngwane National Liberatory Congress (NNLC)
- Ngwane Socialist Revolutionary Party (NGWASOREP)
- People's United Democratic Movement (PUDEMO)
- Sive Siyinqaba National Movement
- Swaziland Liberation Movement (SWALIMO)
- Swazi Democratic Party (SWADEPA)
- Swaziland National Front (SWANAFRO)
- Swaziland National Progressive Party (SNPP)

== Historical parties ==
- Imbokodvo National Movement
- Inhlava Political Movement
- Mbandzeni National Convention
- Sive Siyinqaba, Sibahle Sinje Political Movement
- Swaziland Communist Party (SWACOPA)
- Swaziland Democratic Front
- Swaziland Independence Front
- Swaziland Progressive Party
- Swaziland United Front
- Umbane Movement
- United Swaziland Association

== See also ==
- Politics of Eswatini
- List of political parties by country
