= Lomasontfo Dludlu =

Swazi politician

Member of the House of Assembly
- In office 1993–1998
- Constituency: Maphalaleni

Personal details
- Died: 10 January 2011

Lomasontfo Martha Dludlu (died 10 January 2011) was a Swazi politician. In 1993 she became the first woman elected to Parliament in the country.

== Biography ==
Dludlu grew up in a rural area did not receive a formal education. She worked as a community motivator and looked after disabled residents and orphans.

Despite being illiterate, she contested the 1993 general elections in Maphalaleni and was elected to the House of Assembly, defeating eight men and one other woman, becoming the first woman elected to the House. She remained a member until 1998.

She suffered a stroke in 2008 and died at her home on 10 January 2011 aged 64.
