= Regina Twala =

South African feminist and political activist (1908–1968)

- Born: Regina Dorris Mazibuko; 1908
- Died: 1968 (aged 59–60)
- Other names: Mademoiselle; Gelana; RD Twala; Reggie; Sister Kollie
- Education: University of the Witwatersrand Jan H. Hofmeyr School of Social Work
- Occupations: Feminist activist, writer, researcher, evangelist, and liberation leader

Regina Gelana Twala (1908–1968) was a feminist activist, writer, teacher, researcher, evangelist, and liberation leader in South Africa and eSwatini.

Twala became a prolific researcher, writer and political activist, helping co-found the Swaziland Progressive Party. She was also the only female candidate to run for a seat in Swaziland's first Legislative Council in 1963.

== Biography ==
=== Early life ===
Twala was born Regina Dorris Mazibuko in 1908 in eNdaleni, South Africa into a Zulu family. She was raised on a rural Methodist mission station in eNdaleni. Her mother, Muriel Majozi, worked as domestic worker in Durban.

=== Education and early career ===
Twala graduated from Indaleni Girl's High School in 1924, where, despite the confines of mission education for women at the time, she excelled academically. Twala trained as school teacher at Adams College, an American missionary school along the Natal coast. Her first job was teaching at her former school in Indaleni. While working as teacher in the early 1930s, Twala wrote a regular column for the popular Black daily newspaper Bantu World under the pseudonym Mademoiselle. Twala's biographer, Joel Cabrita writes that the twenty three columns that Twala wrote as Mademoiselle were "pioneering in their forthright celebration of female independence." In 1935, she began to write a similar column for the newspaper Umteteli wa Bantu under the pen name Sister Kollie. While writing for these papers, Twala entered and won several writing competitions, including second prize at the May Esther Bedford Prize for an essay "Tales of Swazi and Hlubiland" that she had written based on interviews with her relatives at eNdaleni.

=== Johannesburg ===
In 1936, Twala married her first husband, Percy Kumalo, a clerk at a gold mine in Johannesburg. She moved from eNdaleni to Johannesburg to live with Kumalo. In Johannesburg, she worked at an American Board mission school against the norm of the time that once married, women stop working outside their homes.

=== Further education ===
Twala studied as part of the inaugural cohort of the Jan Hofmyer School of Social Work, the first institution to train Black social workers in South Africa, where she graduated in 1942 at the top of her class.

In 1948, after completing a BA degree in social studies she became the second Black woman to obtain a degree from the University of the Witwatersrand in Johannesburg (Mary Malahlela, a medical doctor, was the first Black woman to graduate from the university, a year earlier). She then pursued a graduate degree at the university, where her thesis focused on African beadwork.

=== Career ===
Twala became a prolific researcher, particularly on women's issues and native customs in southern Africa. She also founded a library specifically for use by women.

As a writer, Twala contributed newspaper columns to several publications in Swaziland, including Umteteli Wa Bantu and Izwi lama Swazi. She frequently wrote under pseudonyms, including Mademoiselle, Gelana, RD Twala, Reggie, and Sister Kollie. On her death, she left behind four unpublished book manuscripts.

Twala was a pioneering African feminist and a liberation leader, active in the anti-colonial movement.

Her political activity included in 1960 co-founding the Swaziland Progressive Party, in which she was an influential figure.

She was a candidate for Swaziland's first Legislative Council in the 1964 Swazi general election, running as an independent in the Manzini constituency. Twala was the only woman to be nominated in the election. She did not win a seat.

In addition, Twala was a pioneer of Pentecostal worship in the region, an active member of the evangelical Christian movement. She is credited with introducing the Assemblies of God denomination to the area that is now eSwatini.

=== Personal life ===
In 1939, she married fellow social activist Dan Twala, who became a significant collaborator in her work. The couple was close friends with Nelson Mandela and Winnie Madikizela-Mandela.

=== Death ===
Twala died in 1968, one month before Swaziland gained independence.

=== Legacy ===
A book by Joel Marie Cabrita about Twala, entitled Written Out: The Silencing of Regina Gelana Twala, was published in January 2023 by Ohio University Press and Wits University Press.
