= Political parties in Eswatini =

Legal status of political party activities

The status of political parties in Eswatini is not clearly defined.

Political parties were banned in Eswatini in 1973 by King Sobhuza II and this proclamation has not been repealed. The 2005 Constitution does not mention political parties, but does guarantee freedom of association, and the African United Democratic Party was registered as a legal political party on the basis of this.

King Mswati III is reported to have made contradictory statements regarding the status of political parties:

"The old constitution had actually written that we banned political parties but these days when you read our new constitution, our new constitution allows the freedom of rights. There is nothing which says we ban parties." April 2006.

"I want to stress to you that political parties remain banned up until the people of Swaziland say so." August 2007.

Chief Gija Dlamini of the Elections and Boundaries Commission stated that political parties were unlawful and that the freedom of association clause in the constitution did not include political parties. Attorney General Majahenkhaba Dlamini stated that parties were legal but not permitted to participate in elections.

There is no legislation in Eswatini governing registration, regulation, funding and financial control of political parties.

Some members of the House of Assembly do however belong to parties, such as MP Marwick Khumalo who is Secretary General of Sive Siyinqaba.

== See also ==
- List of political parties in Eswatini
- Politics of Eswatini
