= Elections in Eswatini =

The Parliament of Eswatini (or Libandla) is bicameral, consisting of a lower chamber (the House of Assembly) and an upper one (the Senate). Some of the members of both chambers are elected, while the rest are appointed by the King of Eswatini. Election is by secret ballot in a first-past-the-post system of voting. Members of both chambers serve for five-year terms. All candidates run on a non-partisan basis, as political parties are banned.

== Selection process ==
The Assembly has 66 members, of which 55 are elected from single-member constituencies corresponding to the tinkhundlas (tribal communities). 14 tinkhundlas are located in Hhohho District, 11 in Lubombo District, 16 in Manzini District, and 14 in Shiselweni District. Candidates are first nominated at the tinkhundla level. The top three finishers then proceed to a general election, where the candidate who receives the most votes is elected. The King appoints the other ten members, at least half of whom must be women. The 66th member is the Speaker of the House, who is elected from outside the House. If the percentage of women members falls below 30%, a maximum of four women may be elected from the administrative regions.

The House selects ten of the 30 members of the Senate, and the King appoints the rest. Of these, at least five of the ten and at least eight of the 20 must be women. However, according to the Inter-Parliamentary Union database, in 2008, there were 12 women senators instead of the minimum stipulated 13, and in 2013, there were only ten.

== Qualifications and disqualifications ==
Each Member of Parliament must be at least 18 years old, a citizen, a registered voter, and have "paid all taxes or made arrangements satisfactory to the Commissioner of Taxes". Disqualifications are: being insolvent under any law without having been "rehabilitated", being of unsound mind, sentenced to death or more than six months in prison for a crime in Eswatini, a member of the country's armed forces or holding or acting in a public office without being granted a leave of absence to serve in the Senate, unqualified to be a voter, otherwise disqualified by law, found incompetent to hold public office, connected to a firm with a government contract and having not made the proper disclosures regarding the contract, or holding or acting in any office connected with the conduct of any election or the compilation or revision of any electoral register.

== Oversight ==
The Elections and Boundaries Commission is an independent authority consisting of a chairperson, a deputy chairperson and three others whose duties include overseeing voter registration, ensuring fair and free elections and reviewing and determining tinkhundla boundaries. Members are appointed for a single term not exceeding 12 years.

== Past elections ==
Eswatini held general elections in 2023.

In September 2013, Gelane Zwane ran unopposed and was elected President of the Senate for the third consecutive time. Ngomuyayona Gamedze was chosen as Deputy President, also for the third consecutive time. Six of King Mswati III's selections were members of his family. The current Speaker of the House of Assembly is Prince Guduza Dlamini.

Past elections have lacked transparency. The full results of both the 2018 and 2013 elections were never published.

== See also ==
- Electoral calendar
- Electoral system
