= Barnabas Sibusiso Dlamini =

Swazi politician (1942–2018)

His Excellency Barnabas Sibusiso Dlamini
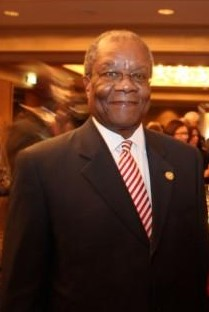
- Dlamini at CHOGM 2011

8th Prime Minister of Eswatini
- In office 23 October 2008 – 4 September 2018
- Monarch: Mswati III
- Preceded by: Bheki Dlamini (Acting)
- Succeeded by: Vincent Mhlanga (Acting)
- In office 26 July 1996 – 29 September 2003
- Monarch: Mswati III
- Preceded by: Sishayi Nxumalo (Acting)
- Succeeded by: Paul Shabangu (Acting)

Personal details
- Born: 15 May 1942
- Died: 28 September 2018 (aged 76)
- Party: Independent
- Spouse(s): Jane Gezephi Matsebula (1970–2012); Joy Nonjabulo Gladness Maziya (2014–2016); Gugu Primrose Simelane (2017-death)
- Education: University of Wisconsin, Madison; University of South Africa; New York University

Prince Barnabas Sibusiso Dlamini (15 May 1942 – 28 September 2018) was a Swazi politician who served as Prime Minister of Eswatini, from 1996 to 2003 and again from October 2008 to September 2018.

== Career ==
Dlamini was a member of parliament from 1978 before becoming Minister of Finance from 1984 to 1993. He was also an executive director of the International Monetary Fund (IMF). From 1996 to 2003, he was prime minister, and in 2003 he became a member of King Mswati III's advisory council.

Dlamini was a candidate, backed by the Swazi government, for the position of Chairperson of the African Union Commission in early 2008. The government withdrew his candidacy out of solidarity with the Southern African Development Community (SADC) so that SADC could present a single candidate.

Following the September 2008 parliamentary election, Dlamini was reappointed as prime minister by Mswati III on 16 October 2008. Jan Sithole, the Secretary-General of the Swaziland Federation of Trade Unions, was critical of the appointment, saying that Dlamini worked to "suppress political organisations and advance the strong rule of the monarchy" during his earlier period as prime minister; he also accused Dlamini of "strong-hand tactics and lack of respect for the rule of law". Opposition leader Mario Masuku, the President of the People's United Democratic Movement, said that Dlamini "was not appointed on merit but on his level of allegiance to the king". Dlamini was sworn in by Chief Justice Richard Banda on 23 October 2008. He took the oath of office both in English and in SiSwati.

In 2013, he was appointed for the third time in the ninth parliament.

== Personal life ==
Dlamini was married three times. His first wife was Jane Gezephi Matsebula, whom he married on 26 June 1970, and who died on 14 December 2012 from kidney failure. On 15 March 2014, he married Pastor Joy Nonjabulo Gladness Maziya; however, Dlamini filed for divorce just over two years later, on 1 April 2016. In November 2017 he married Gugu Primrose Simelane, a teacher by profession. At the time Simelane was deputy head teacher at Siweni Nazarene Primary School. A few months after marrying Dlamini she was promoted to head teacher at Ngwenya Primary School.

== Illness and death ==
In 2017, Dlamini went to Taiwan and South Africa for medical check-ups. He was admitted to an ICU in April 2018 in Mbabane.

Dlamini died at age 76 from natural causes on September 28, 2018, less than a month after stepping down as prime minister.

Political offices
Preceded by Sishayi Nxumalo; Acting	Prime Minister of Swaziland; 1996–2003	Succeeded by Paul Shabangu; Acting
Preceded by Bheki Dlamini; Acting	Prime Minister of Swaziland; 2008–2018	Succeeded by Vincent Mhlanga; Acting
