= 1972 Swazi general election =

- 16–17 May 1972
- All 24 seats in the House of Assembly; 13 seats needed for a majority
Party	Leader	Vote %	Seats	+/–
INM	Makhosini Dlamini	78.03	21	−3
NNLC	Ambrose Phesheya Zwane	18.29	3	+3
This lists parties that won seats. See the complete results below.
Prime Minister before	Prime Minister after
Makhosini Dlamini; INM	Makhosini Dlamini; INM

General elections were held in Swaziland between 16 and 17 May 1972 to elect members of the House of Assembly. The result was a third successive victory for the royalist Imbokodvo National Movement, which won 78% of the vote and 21 of the 24 seats, based on a voter turnout of 74.0%. The Ngwane National Liberatory Congress won three seats, but five days after the election one of its successful candidates was served with a deportation order as an "undesirable alien". Although he subsequently won a High Court ruling against the order, in November the parliament created a tribunal through which his citizenship was revoked. The Appeal Court declared the act unconstitutional, and on 12 April 1973 the parliament passed a motion that "called on the king to devise ways and means of dealing with the crisis". The result was that King Sobhuza II suspended the constitution, dismissed Parliament, banned all political parties and became an absolute monarch.

== Results ==
Party	Votes	%	Seats	+/–
Imbokodvo National Movement	164,493	78.03	21	−3
Ngwane National Liberatory Congress (Zwane)	38,554	18.29	3	+3
Ngwane National Liberatory Congress (Samketti)	6,393	3.03	0	0
Swaziland United Front	797	0.38	0	0
Swaziland Progressive Party	582	0.28	0	0
Total	210,819	100.00	24	0
Valid votes	70,273	98.55		
Invalid/blank votes	1,034	1.45		
Total votes	71,307	100.00		
Registered voters/turnout		74.0		
Source: Nohlen et al.
