= Politics of Eswatini =

Political system of the monarch

Eswatini is an absolute monarchy with constitutional provisions and Swazi law and Custom. The head of state is the king or Ngwenyama (lit. Lion), currently King Mswati III, who ascended to the throne in 1986 after the death of his father King Sobhuza II in 1982 and a period of regency. According to the constitution of Eswatini, the king and Ingwenyama is a symbol of unity and the eternity of the Swazi nation. By tradition, the king reigns along with his mother or a ritual substitute, the Ndlovukati (lit. She-Elephant). The former was viewed as the administrative head of state and the latter as a spiritual and national head of state, with real power counterbalancing that of the king, but during the long reign of Sobhuza II the role of the Ndlovukati became more symbolic. The king appoints the prime minister from the legislature and also appoints a minority of legislators to both chambers of Libandla (parliament), with help from an advisory council. The king is allowed by the constitution to appoint some members to parliament for special interests. These special interests are citizens who might have been left out by the electorate during the course of elections or did not enter as candidates. This is done to balance views in parliament. Special interests could be people of gender, race, disability, business community, civic society, scholars, chiefs and so on. The Senate consists of 30 members, of which some are appointed by the king on recommendation of the advisory council and others elected by the lower house. The House of Assembly has 65 seats, of which 55 are occupied by elected representatives from the 55 constituencies around the country, and 10 are appointed by the king on recommendation of the advisory council. The attorney general is the ex-officio member. Elections are held every five years.

== Monarchy ==
As stated by the Swazi law and custom, the monarch holds supreme executive, legislative, and judicial powers. The Ngwenyama (lion) is a hereditary leader, rules the country, with the assistance of a council of ministers and a national legislature. The Ndlovukati (mother of the king) is in charge of national rituals, and acts as regent if her counterpart Ngwenyama dies and the heir has not performed royal adulthood rituals or is indisposed. If the king's mother is no longer living, one of the king's wives may act as Ndlovukati. In Sobhuza II's case, his grandmother the Ndlovukati Labotsibeni Mdluli was regent from his choice as infant heir in 1899 following the death of his father Bhunu until his accession to full authority in 1922, when his mother Lomawa Ndwandwe became the ndlovukati. Later in his long reign three other women became senior queen; when an ndlovukati died, another was appointed from among his senior wives.

The king and the queen mother rule together in theory, and did so in practice up until the reign of Sobhuza II. Before colonization, the senior queen acted as a check and counterweight to the king's power through her direct control over some military forces and her control of rainmaking medicines and rites. She also played a role in key aspects of the annual Ncwala national ritual that binds the fate of the king and the nation together. British policy and the strength of Sobhuza II's personality shifted power decisively toward the king and away from the senior queen during his long reign.

During a period of intense succession struggles following the death of Sobhuza II, the Ndlovukati was assisted by Prince Sozisa Dlamini, the holder of a novel office, the Authorised Person, in-Libandla. He was then deposed and the mother of the heir, now King Mswati III was made Ndlovukati prior to his full accession. Subsequently, the constitution was revised to provide that where the Regent and the Authorised Person are not in agreement on any matter, the matter shall be referred to Bantfwabenkhosi (princes) and chiefs.

The King, according to the new constitution, is also Commander-in-Chief of the Defence Forces and Commissioner of Police. He and the Queen Mother have legal immunity.

=== Male succession ===
Succession is chosen in relation to the status of the potential king's mother. The iNdlovukati is chosen by the Royal Council after the King's death; he will be from an unrelated family. Within the aristocracy, the first wife is never the main wife - a second wife who has a higher pedigree will take precedence. The Royal family line, the Dlaminis, never intermarry; the King is always a Dlamini, the Queen Mother is never a Dlamini. The king is not followed by blood brothers. He is "Nkosi Dlamini" and is expected to unify his position by choosing wives from all sectors of the community. The balance of power lies between the King and the Queen Mother. The Royal Council plays a key role in the selection of the successor to the throne. Much of this tradition remains secret (or undetermined) - but it is rumoured that the new king must be single, and is usually a minor. His wives are important.

=== Polygamy ===
A Swazi king's first two wives are chosen for him by the national councillors. These two have special functions in rituals and their sons can never claim kingship. The first wife must be a member of the Matsebula clan, the second of the Motsa clan. According to tradition, he can only marry his fiancées after they have fallen pregnant, proving they can bear heirs. Until then, they are Liphovela.

=== Lifestyle ===
King Mswati III is often criticized for his lavish lifestyle in a nation with, as of 2022, approximately 32 percent of people living below 2.15 USD per day and with around 27 percent of people aged 15-49 suffering from HIV — one of the world's highest HIV infection rates.

== Executive branch ==
In general practice, however, the monarch's power is delegated through a dualistic system: modern and statutory bodies, like the cabinet, and less formal traditional government structures.

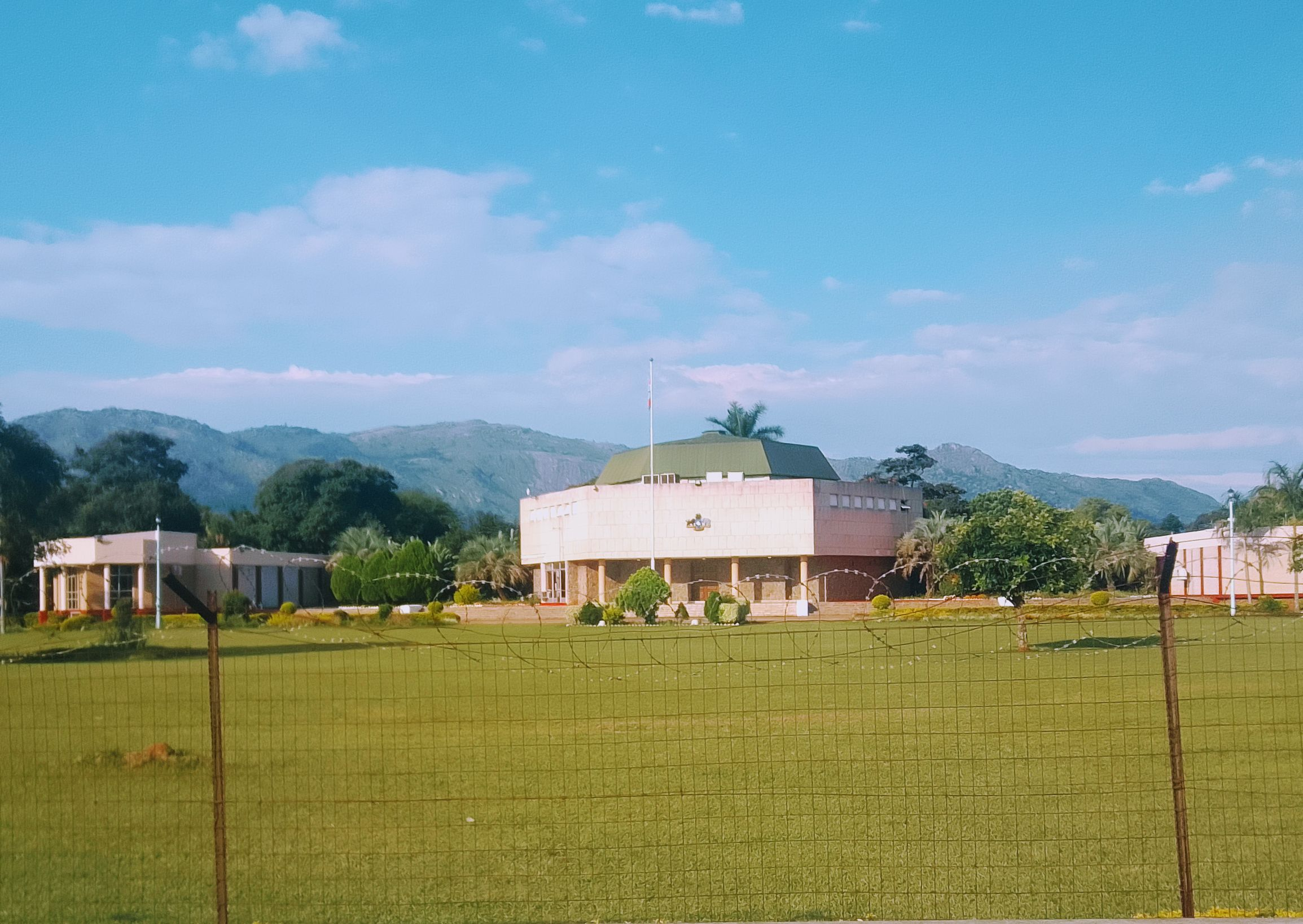
The Parliament of Eswatini in Lobamba

At present, parliament consists of an 82-seat House of Assembly (55 members are elected through popular vote; the Attorney General as an ex-officio member; 10 are appointed by the king and four women elected from each one of the administrative regions) and 30-seat Senate (10 members are appointed by the House of Assembly, and 20 are appointed by the king, whom at least the half must be women).

== Political parties and participation ==
Political parties were banned by the constitution promulgated on 13 October 1978. The new constitution does not take into consideration party activity whereas freedom of association is protected.

Summary of the 20 September 2013 House of Assembly of Eswatini election results
Members	Seats
Elected from tinkhundla	59
Attorney-General	1
women elected for each region	4
Appointed members	10
Total	75
