= Russell Dlamini =

Prime Minister of Eswatini

The Right Honourable Russell Dlamini MP
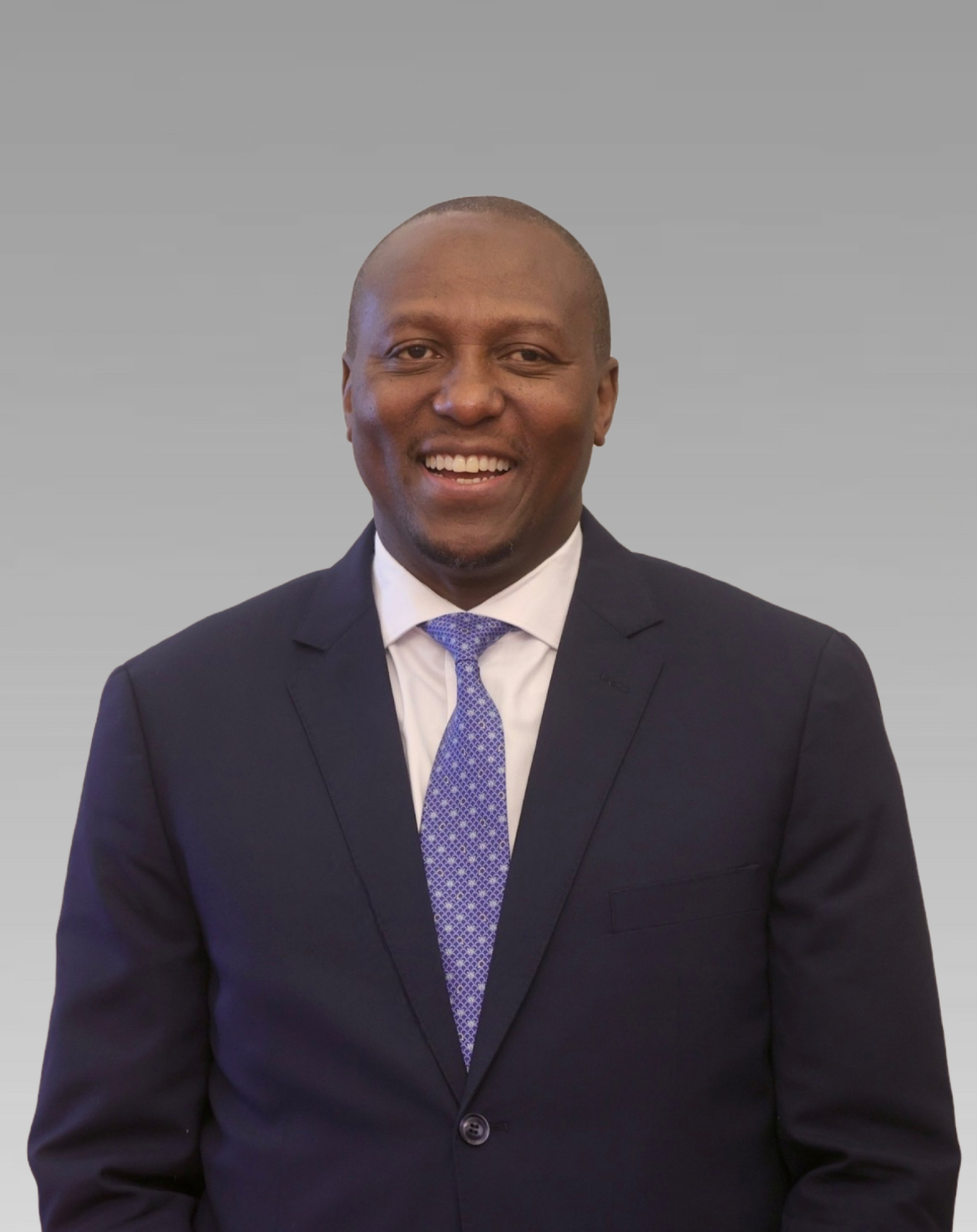
- Dlamini in 2024

12th Prime Minister of Eswatini
- Incumbent
- Assumed office 7 November 2023
- Monarch: Mswati III
- Deputy: Thuli Dladla
- Preceded by: Mgwagwa Gamedze (acting)

Member of Parliament
- Incumbent
- Assumed office 6 November 2023
- Appointed by: Mswati III

Personal details
- Born: Russell Mmiso Dlamini; 23 October 1973 (age 52) Manzini
- Party: Independent
- Spouse: Philile Dlamini (née Kunene)
- Education: University of Eswatini; University of South Africa; Stellenbosch University

Russell Mmiso Dlamini (born 23 October 1973) is a Liswati politician. He has been serving as Prime Minister of Eswatini since 7 November 2023.

== Early life and education ==
Russell Mmiso Dlamini was born in Manzini, Eswatini (then known as Swaziland). Dlamini's mother Joanah (born Vilakati) is a retired civil servant. She worked as a clerk at the Central Transport Administration (CTA). His late father Stephen Sipho Dlamini worked at the king's office. Dlamini did his pre-schooling in Siteki before his family moved to Mbabane where he started school at Mangwaneni Primary School. At Mangwaneni he did grades 1 and 2, and then transferred to Mqolo Primary School for Standard 1 to Standard 5 (grade 3 to 7). He was the first cohort of pupils to go to Mqolo Primary School. Dlamini studied at Masundvwini High School from Form 1 until Form 3 (grade 8 to 10). He completed his high school education at St. Marks High School where he did Form 4 and 5 (grade 11 and 12).

Upon completing high school, Dlamini enrolled at the University of Swaziland (now the University of Eswatini) where he obtained a BSC in Agriculture at the Luyengo campus. He then enrolled part time at the University of South Africa (UNISA) where he completed his Honours in Development Administration and Masters in Sustainable Development Planning and Management. Dlamini has obtained other certificates, including a certificate in Monitoring and Evaluation, Performance Management Systems, and Project Management. In October 2023 he completed a program in Senior Management Development at Stellenbosch University.

== Early career ==
On his Facebook page, Dlamini posted a photo of himself at his first job working as a petrol attendant at Rob's Filling Station in Matsapha in 1992. He narrated that he worked there soon after completing high school, while waiting to start his university studies. After completing his undergraduate degree he worked for two years as a teacher at his former school, Masundvwini High School, before joining World Vision Swaziland. Through World Vision he worked in Zambia and as Integrated Programmes Director in Rwanda. Dlamini has also worked as a management consultant at Virtue Consulting in the Republic of South Africa. In November 2015, he was appointed CEO of the National Disaster Management Agency. Prior to his appointment as Prime Minister, Dlamini was a senior pastor at Nhlambeni Apostolic Faith Mission (AFM).

== Prime Minister of Eswatini (2023–present) ==
Dlamini rose to prominence when King Mswati III announced him as the new Prime Minister during Sibaya (People's Parliament) on 3 November 2023. This followed days of speculation on who the king would appoint as PM. Although Dlamini was the CEO of the National Disaster Management Agency prior to his appointment, he was a relatively obscure individual in Swazi society. Dlamini first appeared on the political scene on 26 October 2023 in the same venue (Sibaya) wherein he made a presentation as one of the panelists during public consultations which were commissioned by the king.

Dlamini's appointment followed the September 2023 general election. The constitution of Eswatini dictates that all members of Cabinet, including the PM, should be members of parliament before they can be appointed into Cabinet. His appointment by the king effectively meant that Dlamini would also become an appointed member of parliament. He was therefore sworn in as a member of the House of Assembly on November 6 at parliament, and subsequently sworn in as Prime Minister the following day at the Cabinet offices. The tenure of the PM, along with that of parliament, is five years.

== See also ==
- List of heads of the executive by approval rating

== See also ==
- List of prime ministers of Eswatini

Political offices
Preceded by Mgwagwa Gamedze; Acting	Prime Minister of Eswatini; 2023–present	Incumbent
