= Cleopas Dlamini =

Prime Minister of Eswatini from 2021 to 2023

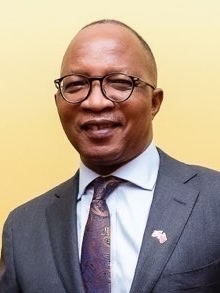
- Dlamini in 2023

Prime Minister of Eswatini
- In office 19 July 2021 – 28 September 2023
- Monarch: Mswati III
- Deputy: Themba N. Masuku
- Preceded by: Themba N. Masuku (acting)
- Succeeded by: Mgwagwa Gamedze (acting)

Personal details
- Born: 26 December 1952 (age 73)
- Party: Independent
- Spouse(s): Nomfundo Maseko; Lomvula Hlophe
- Education: University of Botswana, Lesotho and Swaziland

Cleopas Sipho Dlamini (born 26 December 1952) is a Liswati business executive who served as the prime minister of Eswatini from 2021 to 2023.

He replaced Themba N. Masuku, who occupied the office in acting capacity, following the death of the previous substantive office holder Ambrose Mandvulo Dlamini in December 2020. Before he was named prime minister, Cleopas was the chief executive officer of the Public Pension Fund of the Kingdom of Eswatini. He was also a Senator in the Eswatini Senate.

== Prime Minister of Eswatini ==
On 16 July 2021, following major political unrest against the monarchy in Eswatini, at a sibaya held at the Ludzidzini Royal Village, some 20 kilometres (12 mi) south of Mbabane, King Mswati III, announced his appointment of Cleopas Dlamini as the next prime minister. The new prime minister took the oath of office on 19 July 2021 and also swore in as a member of the Parliament of Eswatini. He chaired his first cabinet meeting on the morning of 20 July 2021. In October 2021, he and Education Minister Lady Howard Mabuza condemned anti-monarchist and pro-democracy student protests that resulted in the closing of schools.

== See also ==
- List of prime ministers of Eswatini

Political offices
Preceded by Themba N. Masuku; Acting	Prime Minister of Eswatini; 2021–2023	Succeeded by Mgwagwa Gamedze; Acting
