= Communist Party of Swaziland =

Political party in Eswatini

Communist Party of Swaziland Emadlela Ndzawonye aseSwatini
- Abbreviation: CPS
- General Secretary: Thokozane Kenneth Kunene
- International Secretary: Simphiwe Dlamini
- Founded: 9 April 2011
- Headquarters: Kamhlushwa, Mpumalanga, South Africa
- Newspaper: Liciniso ("Truth")
- Ideology: Communism; Marxism–Leninism; Republicanism
- Political position: Far-left
- International affiliation: IMCWP
- Slogan: "For Freedom, Democracy and Socialism"

Party flag

Website
- communistpartyofswaziland.wordpress.com

The Communist Party of Swaziland (CPS) is a Swazi Marxist-Leninist party founded on 9 April 2011. It was banned by the Swazi king, Mswati III, shortly after its foundation, and operates clandestinely. The party is headquartered in Kamhlushwa, South Africa.

== History ==
=== Background ===
In an interview with Guancha General Secretary Thokozane Kenneth Kunene shared that it was the South African Communist Party that initially inspired him around the time of the assassination of Chris Hani, the party's leader. In university Kunene joined the People's United Democratic Movement student wing and by 1997 was elected its leader. In the following years he helped organize trade union networks and progressive organizations across Swaziland, but in 2005 he was ousted alongside 35 comrades and has been living in exile in South Africa ever since. In 2007 this group of exiles together with local supporters launched preparations to establish a communist party.

=== Establishment ===
The Communist Party of Swaziland was established on 11 April 2011, a day before the anniversary of King Sobhuza II's 1973 decree banning all political parties.

=== 2021–2023: Anti-monarchy protests ===
The death of University of Eswatini law student Thabani Nkomonove at the hands of police on May 8th, 2021 sparked mass protests initially organized by the Swaziland National Union of Students (SNUS) with many CPS members at the helm. After severe police repression—including storming Nkomonove's funeral and banning all demonstrations—the movement broadened into the pro-democracy protests of 2021. Communist party members were among the earliest victims of state repression against the protests, such as deputy general secretary Mcolisi Ngcamphalala, who was arrested on June 26 and tortured for two hours. At the end of June 2021 the CPS called for a National Democratic Congress bringing together all anti-monarchy forces to write a "minimum program for the transitional period [...] from a monarchy to a republic". The congress never materialised due to division among the groups involved. Instead there followed a crackdown with the army taking over for the police and killing over 100 people by November.

The following year saw repressive action focused on the Communist Party of Swaziland with abductions, attacks and raids against party activists. Following an anti-monarchist protest on February 28th, 2023, one of the organisers, CPS member Mvuselelo Mkhabela, was arrested and tortured before he could flee with the help of other party activists. In June Mkhabela was arrested again and put on trial. Before that he was elected the Propaganda and Agitation Officer of the newly founded Communist Youth League and a member of the Central Committee. Breakthrough News has reported on the repeated arrests, torture and prolonged legal processes used to suppress CPS activists.

== Political positions ==
The party describes itself as democratic, anti-racist and anti-sexist. It aims to, among other things, give all political parties in Eswatini legal status, abolish the current absolute monarchy, establish a democratic system of government and new constitution, ensure freedom of assembly and of the press, allow for the safe return of exiles, and safeguard workers' rights to organize and unionize.

The party strongly condemns Eswatini's relations with Taiwan, which include financial and military aid, which the CPS says has been used to kill protestors in the past. It also stated that it aims to establish diplomatic relations with the People's Republic of China after successfully seizing power. As of 2022, Swaziland is the only African country that diplomatically recognizes Taiwan.

The CPS maintains that the elections which have transpired since King Mswati III reinstated parliament in 1986 are "neither free nor fair" and "only serve to legitimize the monarchy".
