= Sishayi Nxumalo =

Sishayi Simon Nxumalo (1936 – 25 February 2000) served as acting Prime Minister of Swaziland from 8 May 1996 to 26 July 1996. He was finance minister from 1983 to 1984.

He was once leader of the Swaziland Democratic Party (SDP).

Political offices
| Preceded by Jameson Mbilini Dlamini | Prime Minister of Eswatini; 1996 | Succeeded by Barnabas Sibusiso Dlamini |
