= 1962 Swazi parliamentary seats referendum =

- 25 May 1962

Results
Choice	Votes	%
Yes	697	97.35%
No	19	2.65%

A referendum on equalising the number of seats in Parliament for black and white voters was held in Swaziland on 25 May 1962. The change was part of a draft constitution put forward on 2 March by the British colonial authorities, and was approved by 97% of voters.

== Results ==
Choice	Votes	%
For	697	97.35
Against	19	2.65
Total	716	100.00
Registered voters/turnout		52.2
Source: Direct Democracy
