= Dludlu =

Dludlu is a surname that may refer to

- Jimmy Dludlu (born 1966), is a Mozambican jazz musician
- Lomasontfo Dludlu (died 2011), a Swazi politician
- Simphiwe Dludlu (born 1987), South African professional soccer manager and former player.
