= 1978 Swazi general election =

General elections were held in Swaziland on 27 October 1978. The elections were held using the tinkhundla system, in which voters elected 80 members (out of the 160 candidates) to an electoral college, who then selected 40 non-party candidates for the Parliament, whilst the King appointed a further ten. The new system strengthened the position of the country's traditionalists.

The number of seats had been increased from 24 (at the last election in 1972) to 50 due to a significant population increase. There was no voter registration and chiefs were required to ensure that only Swazi citizens could vote.
