= Jan Sithole =

Swazi trade unionist and politician

Jan Jabulani Sithole was a trade union activist and politician in Eswatini. Sithole was president of the Swazi Democratic Party (SWADEPA), and was elected to the House of Assembly of Eswatini (the lower house of the Parliament of Swaziland) in 2013. He died on 12 September 2020 at age 67.

As a founding member and the president of the Swaziland Federation of Trade Unions (SFTU), Sithole first became famous for his involvement in labour actions, including as an organizer of the 1997 Swaziland general strike. He also faced significant push back for his involvement in the Swazi pro-democracy movement, including arrests, kidnappings, death threats and threats of deportation.

As an activist and politician, Sithole has been described as an internationalist, a proponent of democracy and a constitutional monarchist.

== Personal life ==
In the 1980s, Jan Sithole worked as a shift operator in a paper plant in South Africa under its system of apartheid. He was mistreated in his role and following resistance to this mistreatment he was subject to a disciplinary inquiry, of which he was ultimately vindicated. This experience first motivated him to get involved in the labour movement.

Sithole had four siblings, one of whom worked in Angola. He had 8 children, six of them being adopted. His family owned two homes in Eswatini: one in Luyengo and one in Manzini.

Sithole died on 11 September 2020 while in his South African home in Nelspruit. He had suffered from illness leading up to his sudden death but was never diagnosed with anything. He was 67 at the time.

== Swaziland Federation of Trade Unions ==
Jan Sithole was the Secretary General of the Swaziland Federation of Trade Unions for 25 years. He stepped down in October 2009, saying he didn't want to "overstay welcome" in the organization.

During his time in the SFTU, Sithole helped to draft the organizations 27 key demands alongside first Vice Secretary General Jabulani Nxumalo, including the passing of a Swazi constitution, elderly grants, and free primary education.

=== Incidents ===
Sithole was frequently arrested for activities related to his labour activism. In August 1994, he was detained for five hours during a sugar cane plantation strike. He was also arrested on 30 January 1997 while organizing the 1997 Swaziland general strike, along with SFTU President Richard Nxumalo, Vice President and later Speaker of the House of Assembly Themba Msibi, and Jabulani Nxumalo. They were charged with threatening bus company owners to cease operating, but were released after a magistrate found there was no basis to the charges.

In January 1995, Sithole made international headlines following him receiving a number of death threats related to his anti-government activism.

That month, Sithole was first threatened with deportation due to his father being Mozambican. On June 3, 1995, Eswatini police delivered Sithole a letter from the chief immigration officer that ordered him to surrender his passport following his travels to an International Labour Organization conference. The Citizenship Board interrogated him about his nationality, reiterating their belief that he was actually Mozambican. These allegations were ultimately withdrawn on the basis that his mother was Swazi.

Later in 1995, Sithole was kidnapped and abandoned in the boot of a car. During another incident, witnesses alleged that three plain-clothed individuals entered his home from a police car while he was away, and that one of them was carrying a concealed gun. Phone lines to Sithole's home had been cut at the time, fueling suspicions around the incident.

== Parliament ==
Jan Sithole was the president and a founding member of the Swazi Democratic Party (SWADEPA).

In the 20 September 2013 elections for Swaziland's House of Assembly, Sithole was elected as an MP for the Manzini North Inkhundla, nominally as an independent as Swaziland does not recognize political parties. Sithole and his organization were pledged to reform the current governance system in Swaziland from the inside, to "achieve a multiparty Swaziland but through a strategy of participating, as opposed to non-participation". He stated that he was not the only member of his party elected.

Sithole stated that one of his first goals was to bring a bill of rights to parliament. He noted that while the constitution of Eswatini guaranteed the freedoms of association, press and expression, these freedoms had yet to be enshrined in law.

== Positions ==
Jan Sithole has said that he never wanted the monarchy of Eswatini to be abolished. His associates noted that he supported the monarchy. He believed that the monarchy was a unifying force in the nation, and that it had a positive influence on the economy. Sithole believed that the monarch should "reign above politics."

During his time in the SFTU, Sithole sought true democracy, jobs, equality, freedom of speech and respect for human rights in Eswatini. He believed that Eswatini needed a bill of rights to protect critics of the monarchy from being silenced.

Mduduzi Gina, who was elected as Secretary General of the SFTU after Sithole stepped down in 2009, described Sithole as an internationalist.
