= Sive Siyinqaba National Movement =

Political party in Eswatini

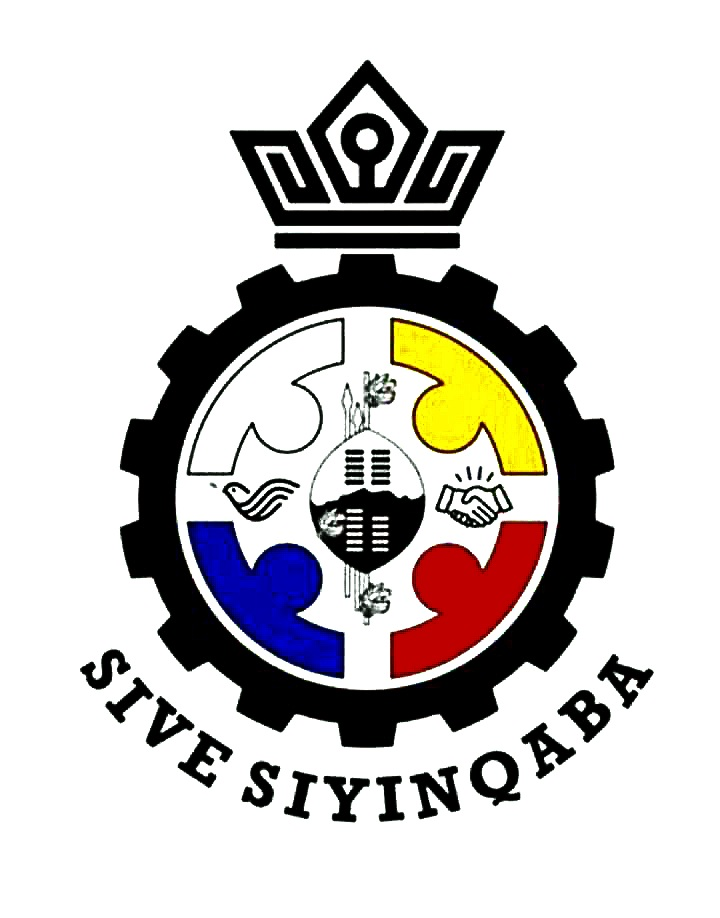
- Abbreviation: SSNM
- President: Ngomuyayona Gamedze
- Secretary-General: Vusi Nxumalo (Acting)
- Founded: 2 April 1996 (as cultural movement); 5 August 2006 (as political party)
- Preceded by: Musa Nkambule
- Succeeded by: Ngomuyayona Gamedze
- Student wing: Youth Front
- Youth wing: Sive Siyinqaba Youth Wing
- Ideology: Liberal conservatism; Constitutional monarchism; Decentralisation
- Political position: Centre-right
- Colours: Blue, yellow
- Slogan: High Discipline High Moral

The Sive Siyinqaba National Movement is a political party in Eswatini. It is led Ngomuyayona Gamedze as of 5 November 2022 as president, taking over from former Minister of Tourism Musa Nkambule and calls for a constitutional monarchy as a replacement for the absolute monarchy currently in place in Eswatini. Sive Siyinqaba National Movement also calls for a government by the people, for the people. The party's official colors blue and yellow stand for peace and wealth.

Marwick Khumalo, a founding member of Sive Siyinqaba, was elected as Speaker of the House of Assembly of Eswatini in 2004. This caused King Mswati III to indefinitely delay the opening of parliament.

On 28 November 2019, Nkambule fled from his home and went into hiding to avoid arrest following his calling on Mswati III to make Eswatini a multiparty democracy. On 18 December, he was among four individuals arrested by police on charges of treason.

Sive Siyinqaba has called the tinkhundla system of government a "dismal" failure in terms of decentralization. In 2018, the youth wing of Sive Siyinqaba National Movement was launched by Letsiwe Gama, with Ronald Dlamini as the first president, Nontsikelelo Manana as the first Secretary General of the Youth Wing and Samkelo J. Dlamini as the first Chairperson of the Youth Wing of the party.

Before the national celebration of the Incwala of 2021, the Acting Chairperson of Sive Siyinqaba National Movement of the time, Ngomuyayona Gamedze of Siphofaneni was expelled from King Mswati III's traditional regiment because of his activity in the pro democracy movement, same as most members of the party.

In early 2022, members of the leadership of the party, including founder Marwick Khumalo were subjected to arson attacks at their homes which were assumed to be linked to the leadership of the Tinkhundla regime due to similar attacks on other political party leaders. In mid 2022 the chairman of the party Musa Nkambule had his home ransacked by members of the armed forces and the Royal ESwatini Police for suspicions of him having knowledge of an underground military group attacking Royal armed forces to pressure the King to political freedom.

In 2021 a Sive Siyinqaba Youth Wing delegation led by Ronald Dlamini and the National Executive Committee led by Musa Nkambule revised the constitution of the party which was then made public on 5 November 2022 during a elective convention which begun the leadership of Ngomuyayona Gamedze as the first president of the party. The leader of the party previously held the position of chairman.
