= 1964 Swazi general election =

General elections were held in Swaziland in June 1964 to elect members of the Legislative Council. The result was a victory for the Imbokodvo National Movement, which won eight of the directly elected seats and all eight Tinkhundla seats.

== Electoral system ==
The elections were held using two voter rolls; a national roll elected eight Africans in "Open seats" and four Europeans from "Reserved seats" between 23 and 25 June, whilst a European roll elected a further four Europeans on 17 June. A further eight seats were elected by the Tinkhundla ("chiefdoms grouped for age regiment mobilisation").

== Results ==
Party	Open seats			Reserved seats			European seats			Total seats
Party	Votes	%	Seats	Votes	%	Seats	Votes	%	Seats	Total seats
Imbokodvo National Movement	79,683	85.43	8	6,385	19.84	0				8
United Swaziland Association				20,093	62.45	4	4,093	59.26	4	8
Ngwane National Liberatory Congress	11,464	12.29	0							0
Swaziland Democratic Party	1,271	1.36	0	4,717	14.66	0				0
Swaziland Independence Front							2,145	31.06	0	0
Swaziland Progressive Party (Nquku)	589	0.63	0	981	3.05	0				0
Swaziland Progressive Party (Mabuza)	267	0.29	0							0
Independents							669	9.69	0	0
Tinkhundla seats										8
Total	93,274	100.00	8	32,176	100.00	4	6,907	100.00	4	24
Total votes	73,109	–								
Registered voters/turnout	139,156	52.54					2,209	85		
Source: Sternberger et al.
