= Marwick Khumalo =

Marwick Khumalo is the current member of the House of Assembly of Eswatini for Lobamba. He was elected as the speaker of the National Assembly in 2004, but was later removed by the parliament for improper conduct, that he apparently committed 25 years earlier when he was 14 years old, all along he thought the issue was settled after elders of that time had discussed it and he was aptly punished. To this day the public is unaware of what improper conduct Marwick was involved in. He stepped down in March in favor of Charles Magongo.

In the Pan-African Parliament, he serves as a member of the PAP for Eswatini. He chairs the Permanent Committee on Cooperation, International Relations and Conflict Resolution.

In March 2008, he led a 64-member delegation of the PAP to observe the Zimbabwean parliamentary and presidential elections, where he unfavorably commented on the political violence being waged in the country.

He is Secretary General of Sive Siyinqaba.
