= Mgwagwa Gamedze =

Former prime minister of Swaziland

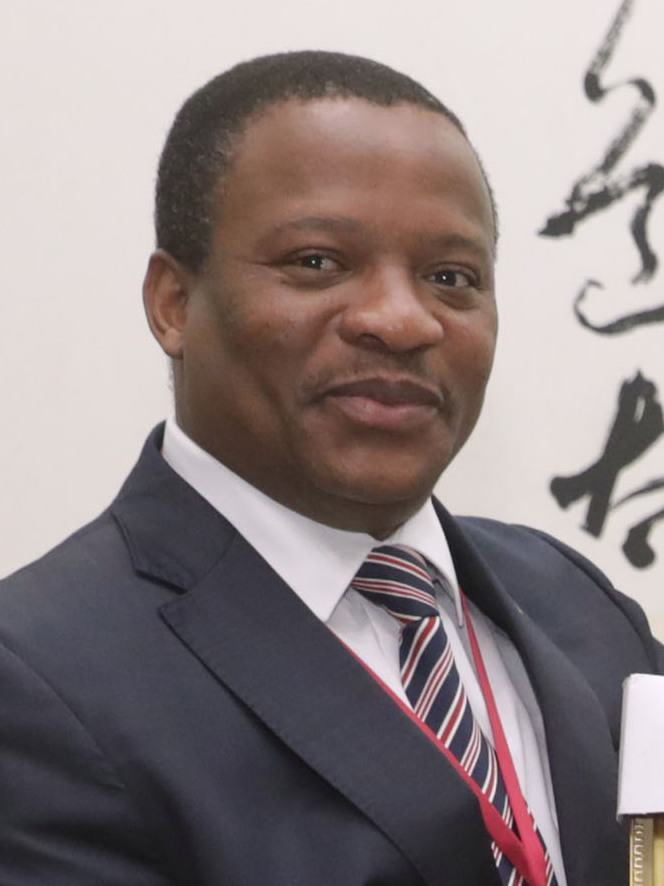
- Gamedze in 2017

Acting Prime Minister of Eswatini
- In office 28 September 2023 – 4 November 2023
- Monarch: Mswati III
- Deputy: Themba Masuku
- Preceded by: Cleopas Dlamini
- Succeeded by: Russell Dlamini

Personal details
- Citizenship: Eswatini
- Party: Independent

Mgwagwa Gamedze is a statesman from Eswatini who served as acting Prime Minister of Eswatini from 28 September 2023 to 4 November 2023. He was succeeded by Russell Dlamini, the former CEO of the National Disaster Management Agency.

Political offices
Preceded by Cleopas Dlamini	Prime Minister of Eswatini; 2023	Succeeded by Russell Dlamini
