= Jameson Mbilini Dlamini =

7th Prime Minister of Eswatini
- In office November 4, 1993 – May 8, 1996
- Monarch: Mswati III

Personal details
- Born: 5 August 1932

Prince Jameson Mbilini Dlamini (5 August 1932 – 5 June 2008) was Prime Minister of Swaziland from 4 November 1993 to 8 May 1996. He was the grandson of King Mswati II- His father was Prince Heleba of Nkamanzi Royal Kraal.

== Biography ==
Prior to his appointment as Prime Minister, he had been a member of the Cabinet since October 1991 as Minister of Public Works and Transport. In his reign with his 17-person Cabinet, he tried to solve economic and political problems of the country. That failed him completely. An opposition of tradesmen, unions and banned but tolerated parties continued to expand resistance to the Dlamini government with rallies and strikes. He was then transferred to High Commissioner for the Kingdom of Swaziland in Kenya. At the time of his death, he was a Member of King Mswati III's advisory council -Liqoqo.

Political offices
Preceded by Andreas Fakudze	Prime Minister of Swaziland; 1993–1996	Succeeded by Sishayi Nxumalo
