= 2003 Swazi general election =

General elections were held in Swaziland on 19–20 September and 18–19 October 2003. Fifty-five independent candidates were elected to the Parliament. Voter turnout was only 18.4% of the 213,947 registered voters.

== Background ==
Prior to the 2003 elections, there was a public debate over whether general elections should be held prior to a planned constitutional referendum on a draft of a new constitution, which was published in March 2003. However, the government chose not to delay the elections, as the draft constitution had not been through a public inquiry.

== Electoral system ==
The 55 elected members of the House of Assembly were elected in a two-round system. A primary election was held in each chiefdom to choose a candidate for the secondary election. In the secondary election, the country was divided into 55 constituencies. Each winner of the primary election then stood in the constituency that covers their chiefdom. Both rounds operate on a first-past-the-post basis. A further 10 members were appointed by the King.

Polls were designated to be open at 07:00 and close at 18:00. Before the polls opened, to ensure transparency and accuracy, the ballot boxes were shown to all voters and the candidates' agents. Polling officers used ultra-violet devices to check for a trace of special dye used to show whether a voter had already voted in the secondary elections.

The Chief Election Officer declared 18 October a public holiday. However, the Federation of Swaziland Employers and Chamber of Commerce (FSECC) responded by declaring that employers were not required to pay their employees for the holiday, if they cited taking a day off to vote.

== Results ==
A total of 1,500 candidates contested the primary elections, 50 of whom were incumbent MPs. 333 candidates progressed to the second round, including only 20 of the incumbent MPs.

| Party | Votes | % | Seats |
|---|---|---|---|
| Independents | | | 55 |
| Appointed members | | | 10 |
| Attorney-General | | | 1 |
| Total | | | 66 |
| Total votes | 39,279 | – | |
| Registered voters/turnout | 213,947 | 18.36 | |
Source: EISA
