= 1987 Swazi general election =

General elections were held in Swaziland in November 1987, having originally been scheduled for 1988, but brought forward due to tensions in the country. The elections were held using the 'Tinkhundla' system, in which voters elected members to an electoral college, who then selected 40 non-party candidates for the Parliament, whilst the King appointed a further ten. Unlike previous elections, all forty of the selected candidates were new to parliament.
