= Ngwane National Liberatory Congress =

Political party in Eswatini

- Founded: 12 April 1963
- Banned: 12 April 1973
- Split from: Swaziland Progressive Party
- Ideology: African socialism Nkrumaism; Pan-Africanism
- Political position: Left-wing
- Colours: Green, Yellow and Black

Party flag

Website
- www.nnlcswaziland.org

The Ngwane National Liberatory Congress (NNLC) is a political party in Eswatini. It was founded on 12 April 1963 as a breakaway party from the Swaziland Progressive Party (SPP) led by Dr. J. J. Nquku.

== History ==
It was launched on 24 February 1963 founded by Dr. Ambrose Phesheya Zwane and Prince Dumisa. It had relations with Ghana as a Pan-Africanist Movement; it sent its members for political training to the Kwame Nkrumah Ideological Institute. Golden Highlanders were sent by the British Army in the early sixties due to pressure of the party’s protest actions in demanding political reforms for an independent state and class struggle for a minimum wage. The congress of the party on the eve of the state election of 1967 saw a clash of interest within members to an extent that many were lost to the loyalty of other political parties and state.

A breakaway party was formed in 1972 on the eve of state elections due to the failure of the President accepting a woman candidate as the deputy president in the party’s congress. The party won three seats out of twenty-four in the state elections and was the first opposition to a Parliament dominated by the Imbokodvo National Movement. Bhekindlela T. Ngwenya was deported by the ruling elite on suspicion that he was not a Swazi, therefore, he could not be a parliamentarian. This was done in total disregard of the courts of the land which ruled in his favor.

In 1973 the ruling party could not tolerate the NNLC as an opposition party and therefore banned it. The leadership of the party was detained for 60 days without trial. The majority of its members that were able to escape went to Tanzania, a pan-Africanist state friendly with the party. After serving a long period in Tanzania the ruling class negotiated the return of the president, Dr. Ambrose Zwane. In 1997 the party reorganized itself though an interim committee led by Jimmy Hlophe.

After the death of party president Dr. Ambrose Zwane, the party buried him on 28 March 1998 in a show of overwhelming public support in which King Mswati III was represented. At the end of November 1998, the party had its congress in which Mr. Obed Mfanyana Dlamini, a former Prime Minister won the presidency. In the 1999 elections, the party opposed the country’s electoral system and boycotted the elections. Some members registered and participated in the elections. These members were taken to a disciplinary hearing where they were expelled. However, in 2003 the party did not have a positional resolution on the elections, for which it opened opportunities for individuals in the party to participate in the elections. The party’s president participated in the elections and won entry as a Member of Parliament into the Nhlambeni Inkhundla. The NNLC has associated itself with the Swaziland Democratic Alliance and the National Constitutional Assembly.
