= Swazi Democratic Party =

Political party in Eswatini

- President: Jan Sithole
- Secretary-General: Mbongiseni Shabangu
- Founded: September 24, 2011
- Youth wing: SWADEPA Youth League
- Ideology: Social democracy
- Political position: Centre-left
- International affiliation: Progressive Alliance; Socialist International (observer)
- Colours: White, Yellow, Red and Black

Party flag

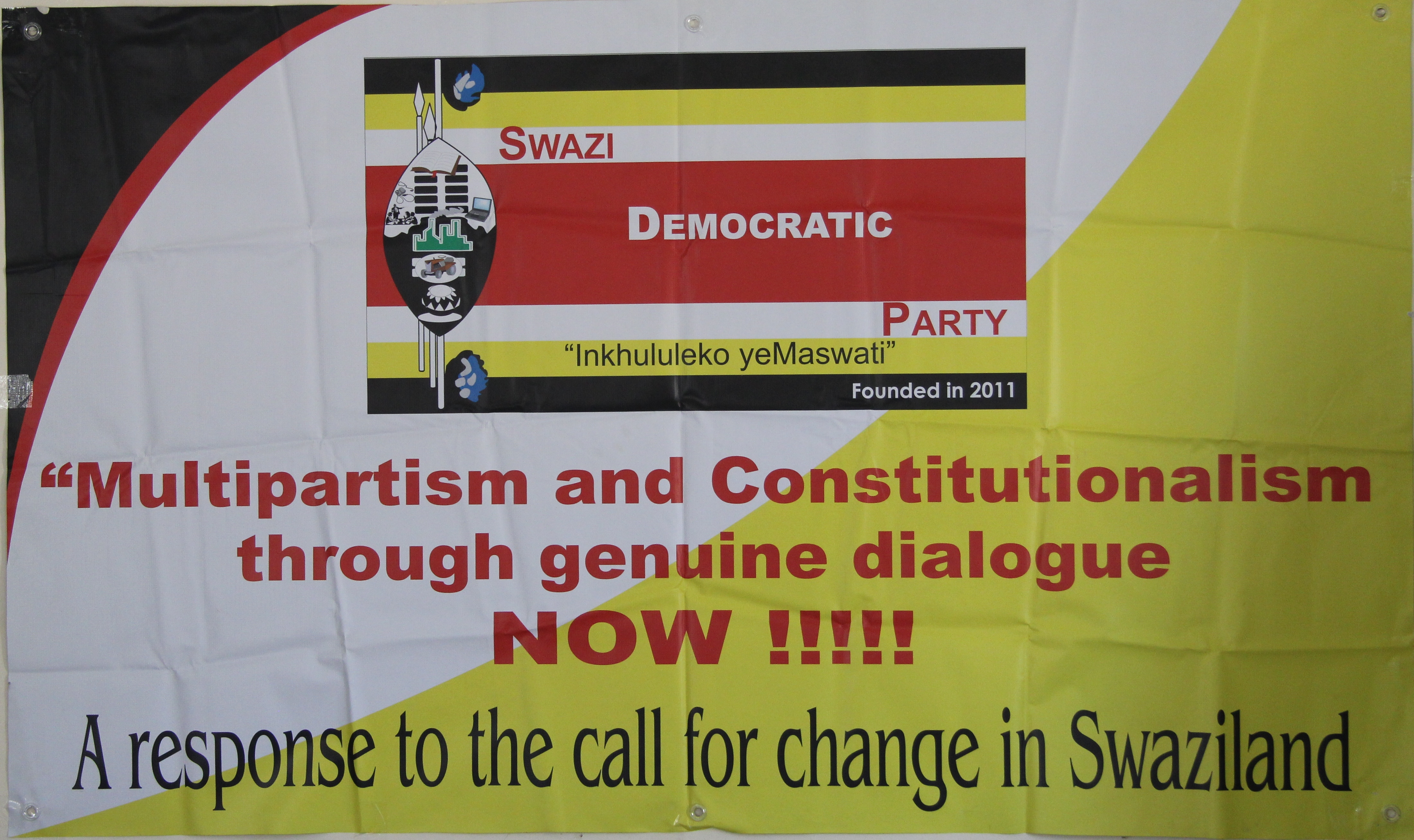
A SWADEPA political banner

The Swazi Democratic Party, also known by its abbreviation SWADEPA, is a political party in Eswatini led by its president Barnes Dlamini. SWADEPA was established in 2011 and took part in the 2013 parliamentary elections in Swaziland by putting up candidates running as individuals.

== History ==
SWADEPA was established September 24, 2011 by long-time veterans in the democracy movement with a background largely in the trade unions supplemented by other civil society institutions such as churches. The leaders of the party were amongst the architects behind a boycott-strategy that the democracy movement has pursued since 1993 with undemocratic elections being held every 5 years. However, with the approval of a new constitution in 2005, SWADEPA was set up in 2011 in trying to change the system from within by contesting the elections. Not substituting mass mobilization, but supplementing it.

== Position in political landscape ==
As an openly declared social democratic party, SWADEPA is the only party in Eswatini with a clear ideology. This is reflected in its strategy and policy platform.

SWADEPA places itself in between PUDEMO and NNLC and the conservative/royalist forces in Eswatini.

It applies a pragmatic strategy of constructive and engaging opposition to the regime, which both serves the purpose of securing its own political room for manoeuvering while demonstrating to the regime and to citizens that demands for democracy doesn't necessarily imply radicalism, republicanism and an overhaul of society and culture.

This is a balancing act in a context of political repression and recurring police brutality which bounds for extremist views. But SWADEPA considers this to be the right strategy – also keeping in mind that no other strategies have proven successful thus far.

SWADEPA has been significantly strengthened in the political spectrum of Eswatini after the elections in October 2013 where SWADEPA won several seats in Parliament and gained a significant number of Constituency Chairpersons (iNdvunaye Nkhundla) and chiefdom representatives (Bucopho) to influence constituency and community political inclinations towards development through democracy.

Also, SWADEPA is an important agent in the wider civil society in Eswatini with a strong representation in the Constituent Assembly, in the Swaziland National Youth Council, in Student Representative Councils, trade unions etc.

Building on the boost from the election and the platform it provided, SWADEPA is today challenging the regime on a daily basis, promoting controversial agendas and pushing for changes of both an overall democratic character, but also policies containing improvements in socio-economic conditions for all Swazi's, workers as well as unemployed, youth, old, men and women. Thus, SWADEPA is advocating for real-life improvements today, that will gather support around the party, empower citizens and increase their understanding of the benefits of democracy in action – instead of exclusively advocating for the in itself rather abstract concept of democracy.

== Organization ==
SWADEPA is geographically represented all over Eswatini, at all social levels and at all three elected levels in Eswatini. SWADEPA's has many thousand members. The organizational structure of SWADEPA is built up as envisioned in the party constitution.

SWADEPA has a branch for each of Eswatini's 55 Tinkhundla. This is the basic unit of SWADEPA. Branches are coordinated in Eswatinis 4 regions, each organized with a regional conference and a Regional Executive Committee.

The National Conference is the supreme body of SWADEPA. Delegates come from branches (90%), and 10% from Women/Youth/Regions. The National Executive Committee, NEC, is the highest organ of SWADEPA between Conferences.

SWADEPA Women's League is open for women members of SWADEPA. It is an autonomous body within SWADEPA, with own constitution. It has the same basic structure as SWADEPA. It appoints representatives to BEC, REC, NWC etc.
SWADEPA Youth League is open for all persons aged 14–35. It is an autonomous body within SWADEPA, with own constitution. It has the same basic structure as Swadepa. It appoints representatives to BEC, REC, NWC etc.

== International ==
SWADEPA was admitted into the Socialist International as observer member in June/July 2014.

The Danish Social Democratic Party, which is the largest party in the governing coalition in Denmark, was engaged in a partnership with SWADEPA from 2012 to 2023 funded through the Danish Institute for Parties and Democracy, DIPD. The “overall objective in the cooperation is to manifest and strengthen SWADEPA’s position as a strong force pressuring for multi-party democracy in Swaziland”.
