= Mlilwane Wildlife Sanctuary =

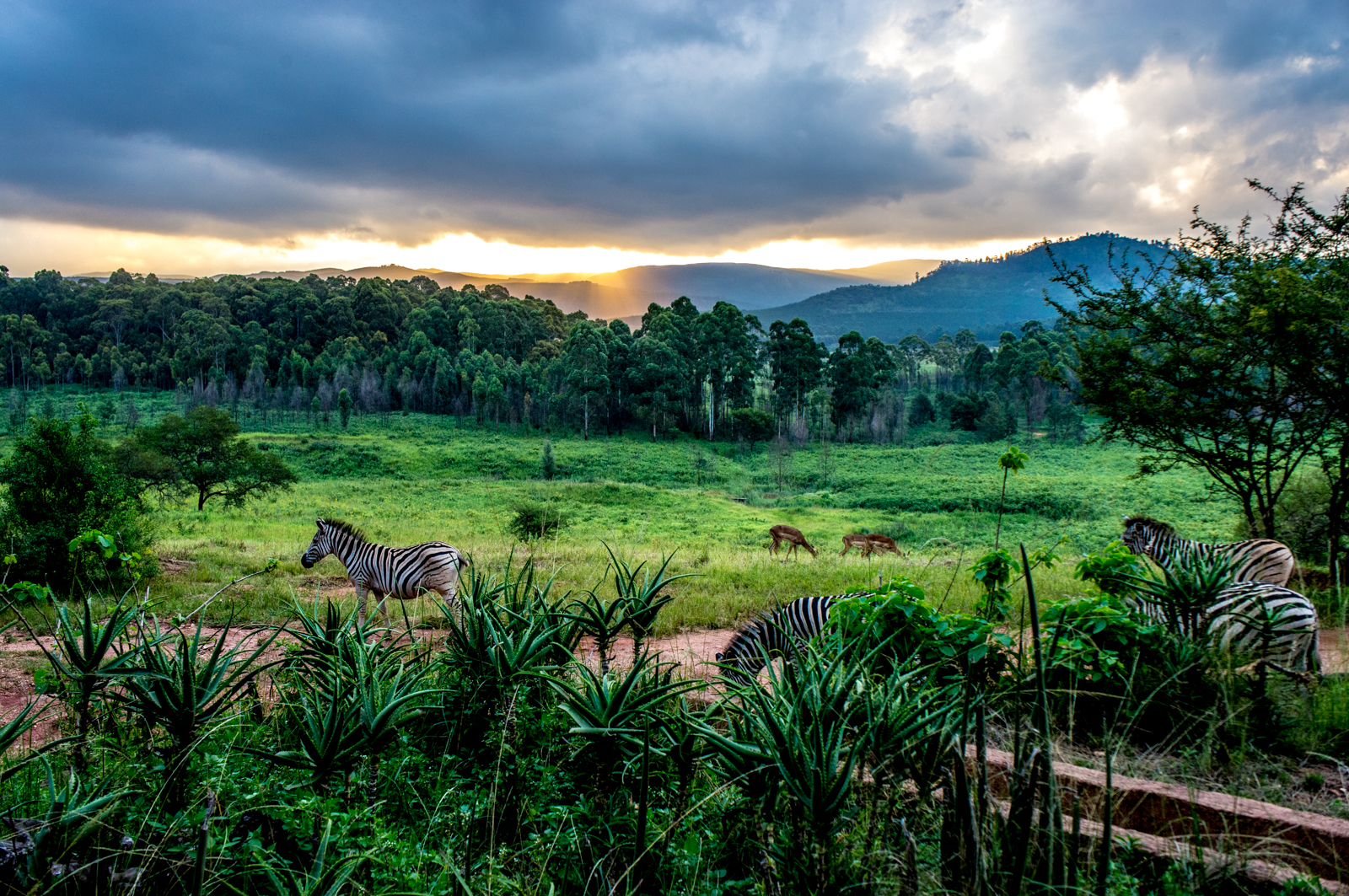
- A picture of Zebras in Mlilwane Wildlife Sanctuary
- Interactive map of Mlilwane Wildlife Sanctuary
- Nearest city: Lobamba, eSwatini
- Coordinates: 26°28′8.68″S 31°9′42.7″E

Mlilwane Wildlife Sanctuary is Eswatini's oldest protected area, owned and managed by a non-profit trust.

== Overview ==
The sanctuary serves as a headquarters for the Big Game Parks including Mlilwane's sister reserves Hlane Royal National Park and Mkhaya Game Reserve. The Sanctuary covers 4,560 hectares in the Ezulwini Valley or "Valley of Heaven". Formerly a farming and tin mining area, the area has been rehabilitated and is now Eswatini's most frequently visited reserve. Abundant wildlife grace the plains. The southern section is predominately open grassland plains with middleveld vegetation, stretching up onto Nyonyane Mountain. Tourist activities are concentrated in the southern section which can be explored by foot, horseback, mountain bikes or vehicle. The northern section includes one of the highest points in the area at Luphohlo. Only guided trails enter this part of the sanctuary. Mlilwane means Little Fire, a reference to the many fires started by lightning strikes on Mlilwane Hill.

== Accommodation ==
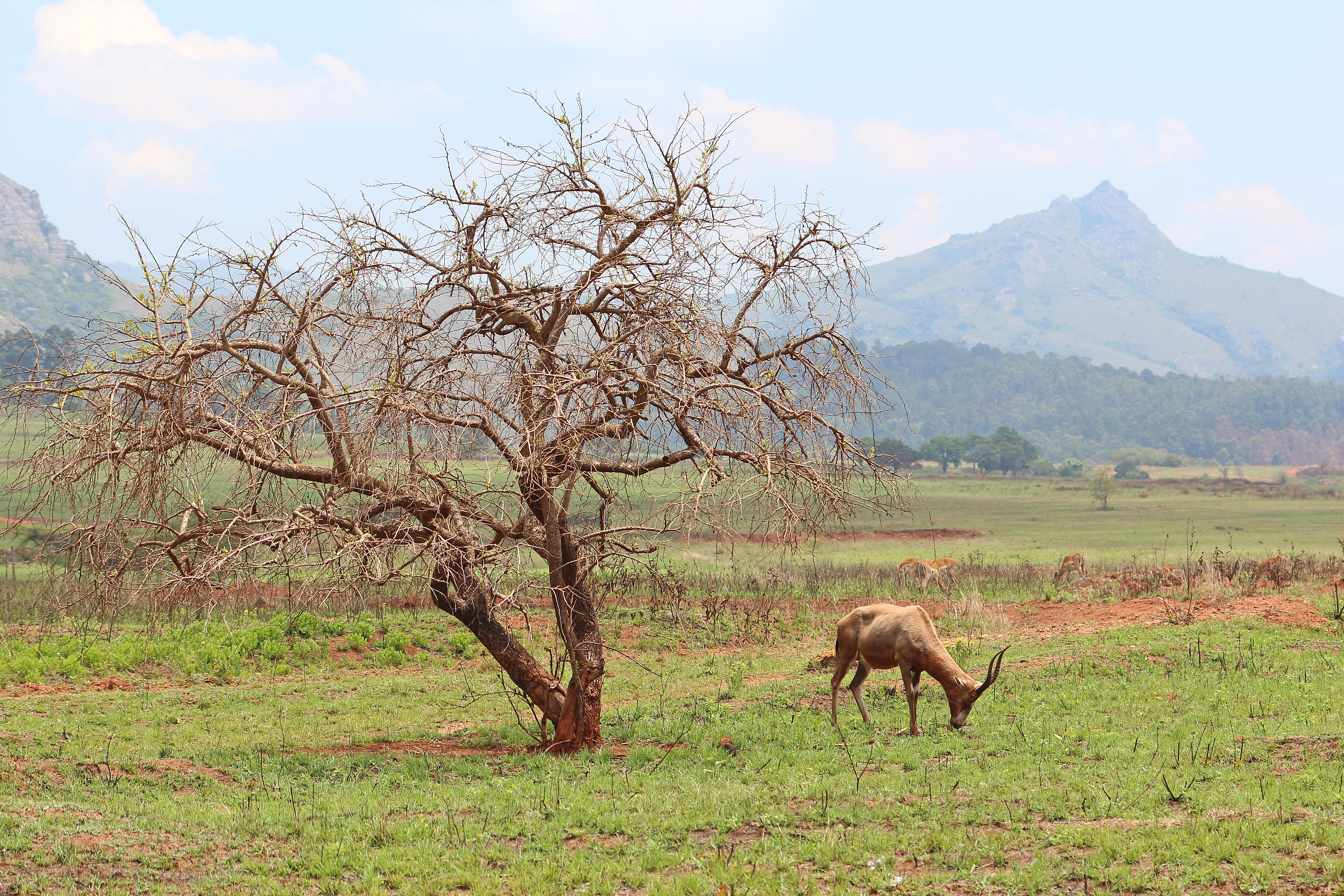
An impala in the sanctuary

There are three structures that accommodate visitors:

- Rest Camp

the camp is found in the southern corner of the reserve where tall indigenous trees overlook a wetland system which is home to hippopotamus, crocodile and a variety of water birds including visiting fish eagles.
Rest camp features traditional swazi round huts, called beehives, and several self-catering units.

- Sondzela backpacker's

offers a wide range of accommodation amidst the park exclusively for international travellers visiting Eswatini

- Reilly's Rock Hilltop Lodge

up-market accommodation

== Main activities ==
- hiking (guided and self-guided)
- game drives (either in private cars or in rented open 4x4 vehicles)
- mountain biking (rented hourly at rest camp)
- warm springs
- horse riding (guided)
