= 1983 Swazi general election =

General elections were held in Swaziland in October 1983. The elections was held using the Tinkhundla system, in which voters elected members to an electoral college, who then selected 40 non-party candidates for the Parliament, whilst the King appointed a further ten. Although there was no voter registration, the government claimed voter turnout was around 80%, although there were suggestions that people were pressured to vote.
