= 2008 Swazi general election =

General elections were held in Swaziland on 19 September 2008 to elect the members of the House of Assembly. It was observed by an Expert Team established by the Commonwealth of Nations. Political parties were banned, so all candidates stood as independents.

== Background ==
It was the first election under the new constitution approved in 2004 and implemented in 2006. Prior to the passing of a constitution, the country was ruled as an absolute monarchy, with laws passed by decree of the king. The new constitution created a Parliament with limited powers; many of the usual parliamentary powers in other modern governments were instead held by royal authorities. For instance, the king chooses the Prime Minister for the Parliament.

It was the first time that foreign observers were allowed to monitor an election in the country. An observer team from the Commonwealth of Nations found that the elections met some international standards, but expressed concerns about both the lack of voter education on the new process and political limitations imposed by the 2006 constitution.

The lead-up to the election included protests by progressive organizations. Two weeks before the election, a demonstration was held ahead of the King's fortieth birthday celebrations, with small explosions and allegations of police brutality. On the day before the election, several union officials were arrested for attempting to block the border with South Africa at Oshoek for a pro-democracy protest.

== Election ==
Political parties remained banned in Swaziland, so all candidates for the 55 seats were independents. Following the election, King Mswati III was to appoint 10 more MPs. The National Assembly would then elect 10 members for the Senate, with the King appointing 20 more. Election turnout was low in the cities, but somewhat higher in the rural areas.

Candidate nominations were made in early August, with primary elections held on 23 August. The general elections were held on 19 September. The Commonwealth election observers expressed concern about the short timeline and a lack of transparency in the nomination process.

After the election, Swazi authorities reported that a number of bomb plots had been discovered, including one that attempted to bomb a royal palace. Mario Masuku, an opposition leader and head of the People's United Democratic Movement (Pudemo), was arrested on terrorism charges as a result. Four opposition political groups, including Pudemo, were banned as well.
