= United Swaziland Association =

Political party in Eswatini

- Abbreviation: USA
- Leaders: Willie Meyer
- Founded: End 1963
- Ideology: White settlers interests Anti-communism; White supremacy
- Political position: Right-wing to Far-right

The United Swaziland Association (USA) was a political party that promoted interests of the Europeans in Swaziland. USA was founded in 1963. It was led by Willie Meyer.

== History ==
The USA cooperated with the Swazi traditionalists but after the end of the alliance with the traditionalists, the USA began to support South African bantustan politics in Swaziland. The USA even suggested that South Africa or the United Kingdom buy out European holdings.

The only challenger of the USA was the Swaziland Independence Front (SIF). The SIF was like the United Party, the United National South West Party and the Rhodesia Party more liberal and moderate than the USA.
