= 1993 Swazi general election =

General elections were held in Swaziland in September and October 1993. The elections was held using the Tinkhundla system, in which voters elected members to an electoral college, who then selected 55 non-party candidates for the Parliament (an increase from 40 at the previous election), whilst the King appointed a further ten.

Unlike previous Tinkhundla elections, voters were registered, with a total of 283,93 people on the voter roll. The number of candidates was 2,094, though observers estimated voter turnout to be only 13-15%.
