= Swaziland National Association of Teachers =

Trade union in Eswatini

The Swaziland National Association of Teachers (SNAT) was formed in 1928. SNAT is called an 'association' because associations are more easily registered than trade unions in Eswatini (formerly known as Swaziland). SNAT represents teachers in schools and universities – with some 9,000 members it is the largest union in Eswatini. The union has several offices and full-time officers.
