= John Nquku =

Southern African politician (born 1899)

John June Nquku (born 1899, date of death unknown) was an early Swaziland nationalist and creator of Swaziland's first political party, the Swaziland Progressive Party.

== Early life and education ==
Nquku was born in Pietermaritzburg, South Africa to a Zulu family. He went to Natal, South Africa and attended St. Chad's College before moving to Swaziland in 1930.

== Career ==
Nquku began his career as a principal, later becoming an inspector of Swazi schools. He resigned from the position in 1940, joining the Swazi National Council. In 1944, Nquku became the secretary-general of the United Christian Church of Africa. In 1945, Nquku became President of the Swaziland Progressive Association, which then evolved into the Swaziland Progressive Party (SPP) in 1960.

== Politics ==
On May 18, 1961, during a meeting to establish the constitution for Swaziland, Nquku was banished for having an unapproved and detrimental party. The following year, in February 1962, Nquku was deposed as party leader for allegedly corrupt and dictatorial practices. Ambrose Phesheya Zwane was elected to replace him. Later that year, in August 1962, Nquku was suspended from the SPP due to allegations of fraud, and was replaced by K.Y. Samketi.

In 1963, Nquku regained his position as party leader of the SPP after being appointed by the secretary of the government.

== Literature ==
Outside of his political career, Nquku wrote multiple pamphlets which include a biography of the King of Swaziland Sobhuza II and a collection of folk tales in the Swazi language.
