= 1998 Swazi general election =

General elections were held in Swaziland on 16 and 24 October 1998. The elections was held using the inkhundla system, in which voters elected members to an electoral college, who then selected 55 non-party candidates for the Parliament, whilst the King appointed a further ten. 198,445 voters were registered (out of a potential pool of around 400,000 due to calls from the opposition to boycott the election), with 119,845 casting votes, giving a turnout of 60.4%.
