= Senate of Eswatini =

Upper house of the Parliament of Eswatini

Senate of Eswatini I-Senate yase-Eswatini
- 11th Parliament
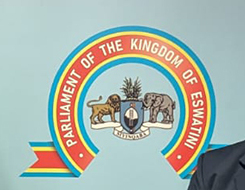

Type
- Type: upper house of the Parliament of Eswatini

History
- Founded: 1967

Leadership
- President: Lindiwe Dlamini, Independent since 23 October 2018
- Deputy President: Ndumiso Mdluli, Independent since 23 October 2018

Structure
- Seats: 31, currently 30
- Length of term: 5 years

Elections
- Voting system: Election by the House of Assembly (10 seats); Appointment by the King (20 seats)

Meeting place
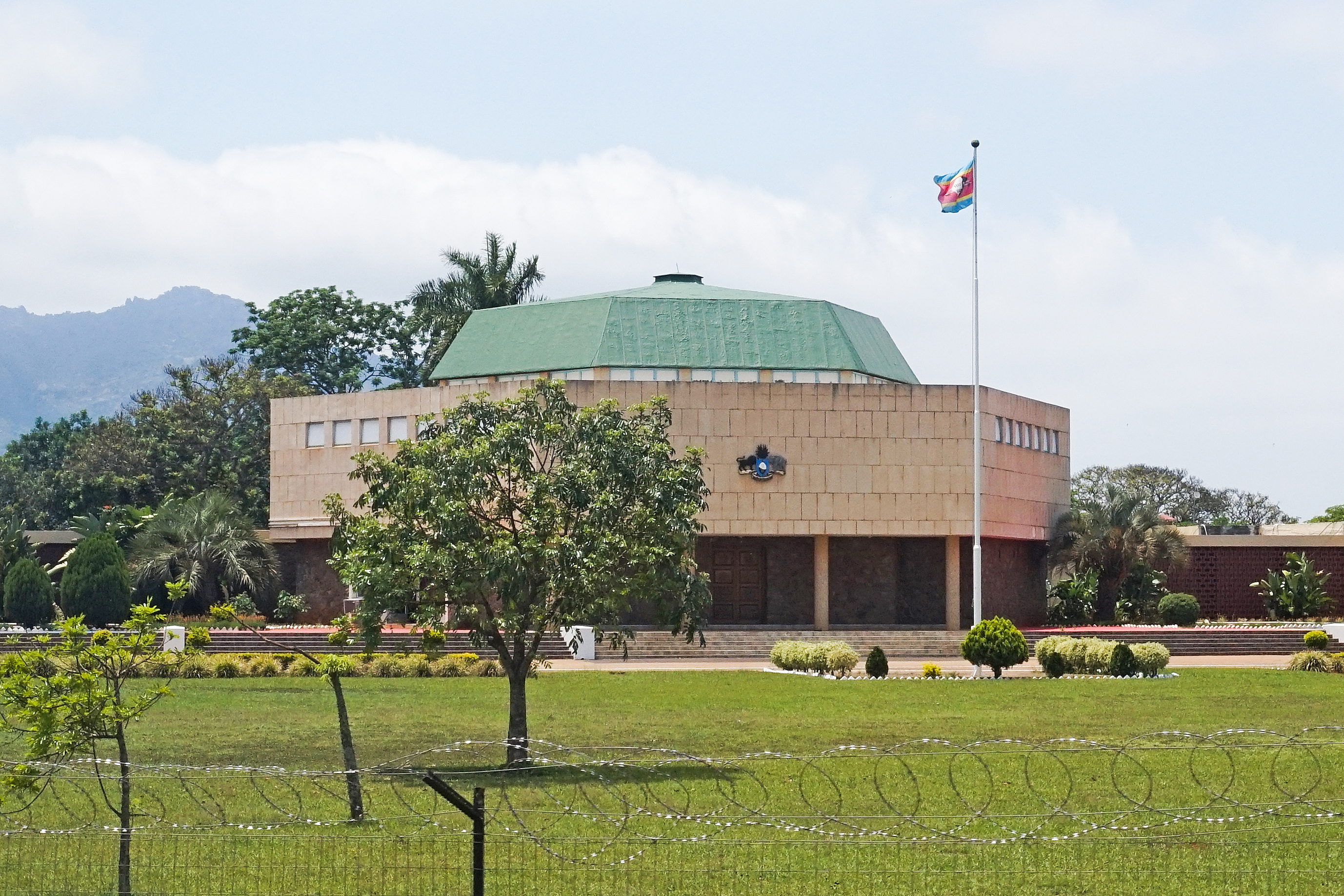
- Lobamba, Hhohho Region

Website
- parliament.gov.sz/senate/

Constitution
- Constitution of Eswatini

The Senate of Eswatini is the upper chamber of the country's bicameral Parliament. The Senate may debate or pass a bill, with the exception of a "money bill", which must first be introduced in the lower chamber, the House of Assembly.

== History ==
The Senate was established in 1967 when the Legislative Council was disbanded and bicameral legislature was established in the new constitution.

== Constitution ==
The Senate must not exceed 31 members, and currently numbers 30. The King of Eswatini appoints 20, while the remaining ten are elected by the House of Assembly. Of these, at least eight of the 20 and at least five of the ten must be women. However, according to the Inter-Parliamentary Union database, in 2008, there were 12 women senators instead of the minimum stipulated 13, and in 2013, there were only ten.

== Elections ==
Election is by secret ballot in a first-past-the-post system of voting. All senators serve five-year terms. Each senator must be at least 18 years old, a citizen, a registered voter, and have "paid all taxes or made arrangements satisfactory to the Commissioner of Taxes". Disqualifications are: being insolvent under any law without having been "rehabilitated", being of unsound mind, sentenced to death or more than six months in prison for a crime in Eswatini, a member of the country's armed forces or holding or acting in a public office without being granted a leave of absence to serve in the Senate, unqualified to be a voter, otherwise disqualified by law, found incompetent to hold public office, connected to a firm with a government contract and having not made the proper disclosures regarding the contract, or holding or acting in any office connected with the conduct of any election or the compilation or revision of any electoral register.

In July 2005, a new constitution was approved by the Parliament and signed by King Mswati III. The first election under the new constitution took place in September 2008. The most recent election was held in September 2013. Gelane Zwane ran unopposed and was elected President of the Senate for the third consecutive time. Ngomuyayona Gamedze was chosen as Deputy President, also for the third consecutive time. Six of the King's selections were members of his family.

Later in 2013, the Senate banned Members of Parliament from divorcing while in office to "avoid embarrassing the king."

== See also ==
- History of Eswatini
- List of national legislatures
- List of presidents of the Senate of Eswatini
- Legislative branch
