= 2013 Swazi general election =

General elections were held in Swaziland on 20 September 2013.

== Background ==
The primary elections began on 24 August 2013 with one candidate elected from each chiefdom. Those elected then go on to represent the chiefdom in the general election, where one candidate from each Inkhundla (constituency) is then elected to the House of Assembly.

Some political analysts have voiced concerns that women are being prevented from participating in the primary elections. In one case, a nominated candidate was disqualified because she was wearing trousers. The High Court later ordered the Elections and Boundaries Commission (EBC) to add her name back to the ballot. However, some residents from her chiefdom threatened to boycott the elections, complaining that she had not been properly nominated.

== Electoral system ==
About 415,000 were registered to vote for the 55 of 65 seats in the House of Assembly. The other ten seats are to be filled by nominees from King Mswati III when he selects his cabinet and Prime Minister.

== Campaign ==
As a result of the presence of a number of reform candidates, there was speculation of a more inclusive government by the traditionalists. However, the banned opposition groups such as the Pudemo party and the South Africa-based Swaziland Solidarity Network called for a boycott.

== Results ==
Party	Votes	%	Seats
Independents	251,278	100.00	55
Nominated			10
Total	251,278	100.00	65
Total votes	251,278	–	
Registered voters/turnout	414,704	60.59	
Source: EBC

== Conduct ==
A team of Commonwealth observers released a report stating that Swaziland "fell short" of its democratic obligations during the elections. It criticised poor gender equality and noted that in the 55 constituencies, only one woman was elected. King Mswati III's nomination of just three women to parliament left it short of the 30% requirement outlined in the 2005 constitution and provisions to increase the number of women were ignored. The Commonwealth promised to continue exerting pressure on Swaziland for change.
