= Imbokodvo National Movement =

Political party in Eswatini

- Founded: April 1964
- Dissolved: 1973
- Ideology: Monarchism; Royalism; Cultural conservatism

The Imbokodvo National Movement (INM) was a political party in Swaziland (in 2018 renamed to Eswatini) that existed from 1964 until 1973, when political parties were banned. The party was formed by the Swazi National Council, which was the advisory body to King Sobhuza II. It won the first democratic election in Swaziland held in 1967. The party also won the second parliamentary election in 1972. The INM effectively ceased to exist after the banning of political parties in 1973 after the annulment on the constitution and the introduction of a decree in the country.

== Electoral history ==
=== House of Assembly elections ===
Election	Votes		%	Seats	+/–	Position	Result
1964	Open seats	79,683	85.3%	16 / 24	▲8	▲1st	Supermajority government
1964	Reserved seats	6,385	19.9%	16 / 24	▲8	▲1st	Supermajority government
1967	191,160		79.4%	24 / 24	▲15	1st	Only party in legislature
1972	164,493		78.0%	21 / 24	▼3	1st	Supermajority government
