= 2023 Swazi general election =

- 29 September 2023

59 elected seats in the House of Assembly 30 seats needed for a majority

General elections were held in Eswatini on 29 September 2023. As the country is an absolute monarchy, the role of the parliament is mostly advisory.

== Electoral system ==
The House of Assembly consists of 59 elected seats and up to ten chosen by the Ngwenyama. The 59 elected members are elected in a two-round system. A primary election is held in each of the 385 chiefdoms to choose a candidate for the secondary election. In the secondary election, the country is divided into 59 constituencies; each winner of the primary election then stands in the constituency that covers their chiefdom. Both rounds operate on a first-past-the-post basis, with all candidates running as independents.

== Results ==
Eswatini's Tinkhundla electoral system prohibits political parties; all candidates stand as independents.

Composition	Seats
Elected members (popular vote)	59
Members appointed by the Ngwenyama	10
Total (House of Assembly)	69

Following the election, King Mswati III appointed Russell Mmiso Dlamini as Prime Minister in November 2023.
