= Lobamba =

Legislative capital city of Eswatini

- Capital city (legislative branch)
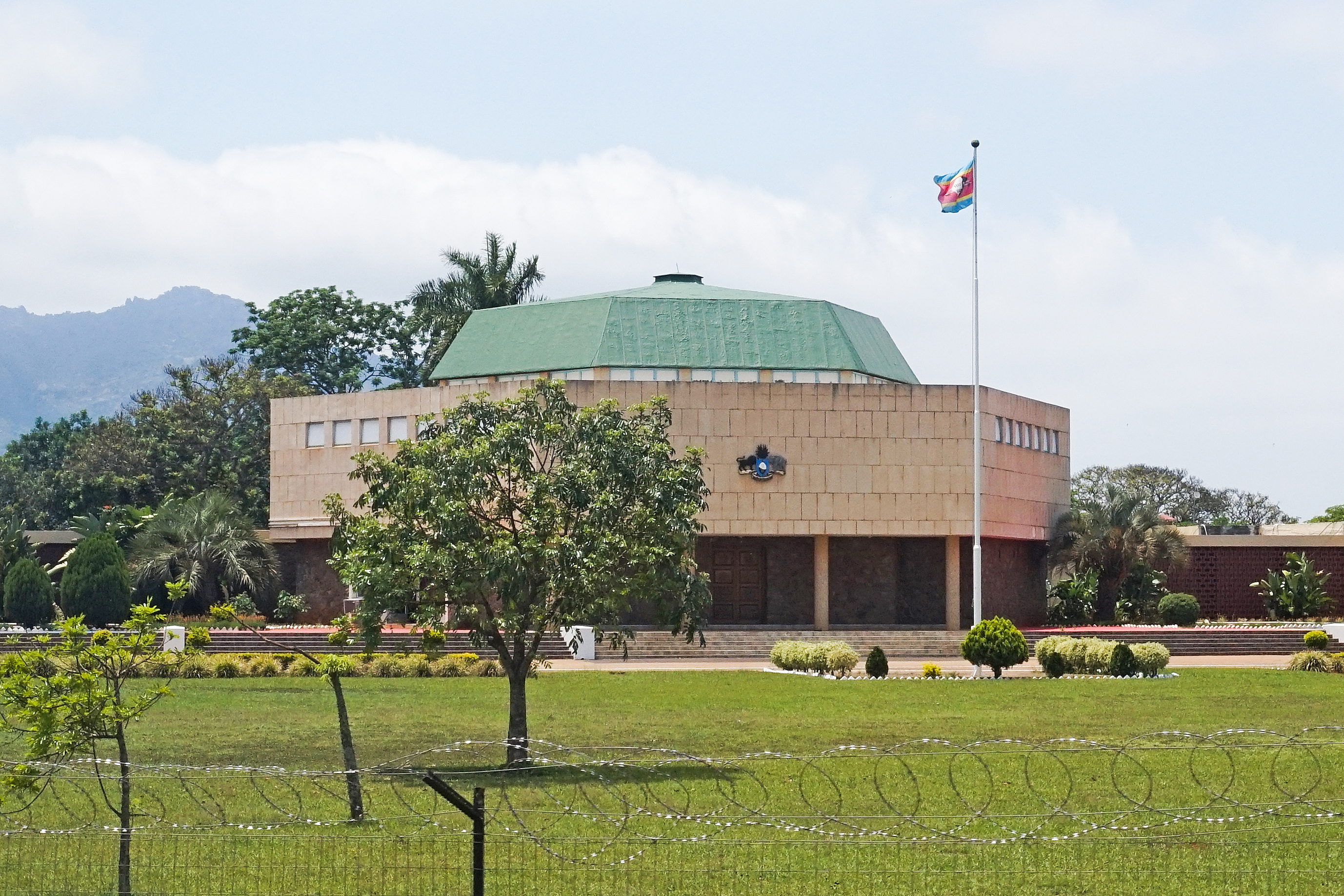
- Eswatini parliament building in Lobamba

- Location within Eswatini Location within Africa
- Coordinates: 26°26′47″S 31°12′06″E
- Country: Eswatini
- District: Hhohho
- Elevation: 694 m (2,277 ft)

Population (2006)
  - Total: 9,900
- Time zone: UTC+02:00 (SAST)
- Postal code: H107
- Area code: 416 (country code +268)
- ISO 3166 code: SZ/SWZ

Lobamba is a town in Eswatini located in between Eswatini's two main cities, Mbabane and Manzini.

It is located in the Hhohho region, with Mbabane as the nearest city and Lusushwana river as the nearest river. It is located between Ezulwini and Mahlanya and is opposite Elangeni.

This town holds cultural significance in Eswatini as it features places of great significance. It serves as a legislative, traditional, spiritual, seat of government of the Parliament of Eswatini, and Ludzidzini Royal Village, the residence of Queen Ntfombi, the Queen Mother.

It is about ten kilometres from King Mswati III 's palace, the Lozitha Palace. It also houses Somhlolo National Stadium.

== Overview ==
Lobamba is located in the western part of the country in the woodland "Valley of Heaven", or Ezulwini Valley. It is 16 kilometres (10 mi) from Mbabane, in the district of Hhohho and has a subtropical climate with wet summers and dry winters.

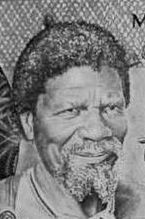
Sobhuza II

In 1997 its population was 3,625. Its population in 2006 was 11,000. Across the country, 84.3% of its people are Swazi and 9.9% are Zulu. The remainder are Tsonga (2.5%), Indian (1.6%) and others (1.7%). Its official languages are Swazi and English.

== History ==
Two areas have been called Lobamba, the first now called "Old Lobamba" was established in 1750 in southern Eswatini. The subject of this article is a settlement that was created by Sobhuza II in the northwest section of the country. (Note: In the mid 18th century ancestors of Sobhuza I came to (old) Lobamba from the north. About 1750 Swazi was founded in (old) Lobamba by Dlamini dynasty chief Ngwane III, according to local tradition. His son, Ndvungunye, died in 1815 and Sobhuza I became the king and founder of modern Eswatini, ruling from his Shiselweni royal residence beginning in 1818. The city of (old) Lobamba was built in 1820 as headquarters for Sobhuza I, who died in 1838.)

In 1903, following the Boer Wars, the British government took control of Eswatini, and it was then ruled by a regent. In 1921 King Sobhuza II became leader of Eswatini, which was still under the British government's control. Eswatini became independent of the British government on September 6, 1968, which was announced at a cattle byre in Lobamba by Prince Makhosini. He was the country's first prime minister and the great-grandson of Sobhuza I. With its independence, Eswatini was a member in its own right of the Organization of African Unity (OAU), British Commonwealth, and the United Nations. It was made a constitutional monarchy under Sobhuza II, who lived in the royal residence, or kraal, in Lobamba.

== Government ==
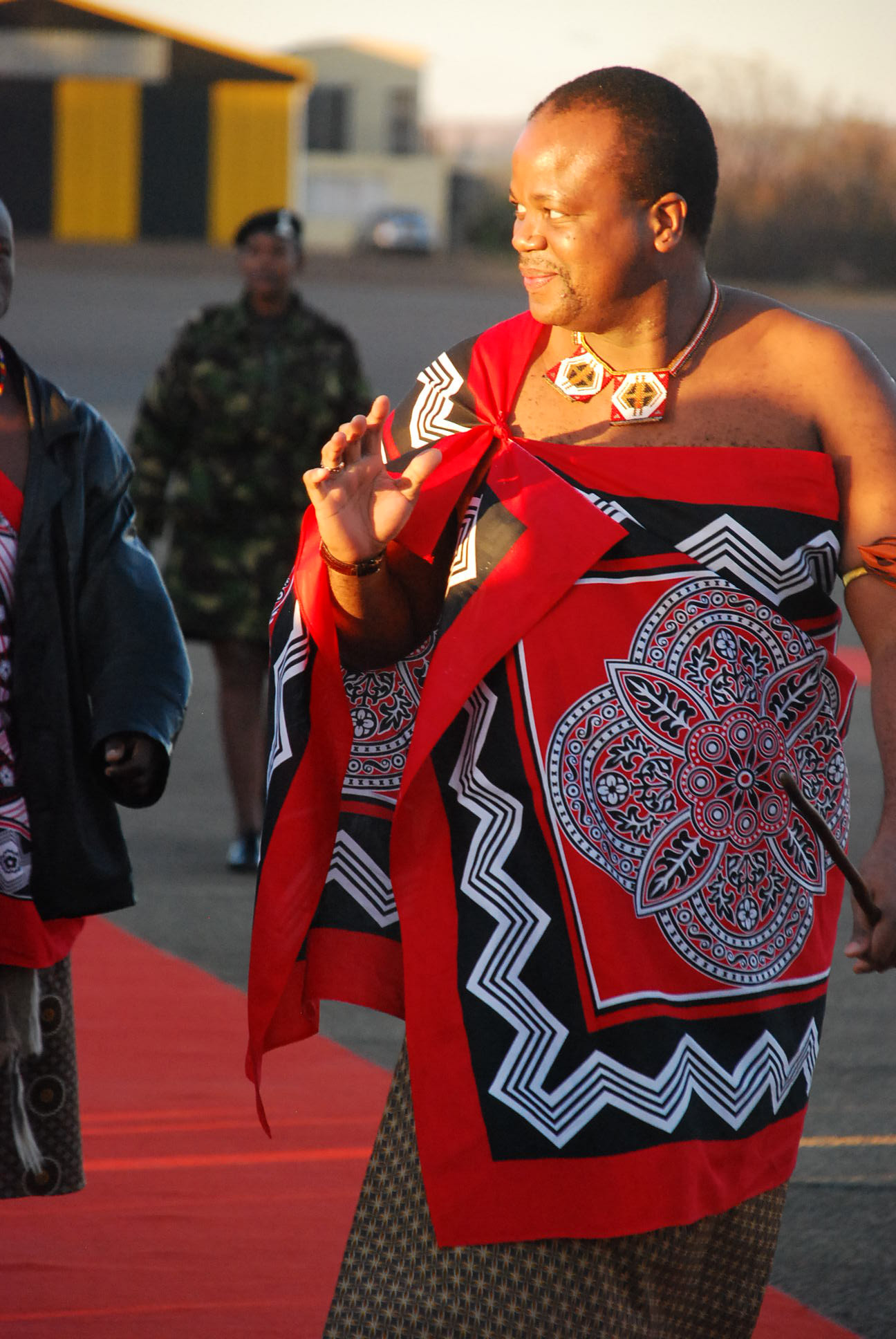
Mswati III, King of Eswatini April 1986–present

Lobamba is the legislative seat of the Eswatini government.

=== Parliament of Eswatini ===
It was made a branch of the Commonwealth Parliamentary Association on January 1, 1965, and its date of independence was January 1, 1968. The constitution was signed by King Mswati III on July 26, 2005. The king appoints the prime minister and the council. There are two chambers: the Senate and the House of Assembly. The parliament building is occasionally open to visitors.

Lobamba also has Inkhundla, where residents can get services like birth certificate registration, passports, identity cards, and other national documents.

=== Embo State Palace ===
The royal Embo State Palace was built by the British to house the polygamous Sobhuza II and his family, including 600 children. It is not open to visitors and photographs are not allowed.

=== Royal residences ===
King Mswati III lives at the Lozitha Palace, about ten kilometres (6 mi) from the city. He visits the Royal Kraal, or Ludzidzini Royal Residence, during the Umhlanga dance and Incwala ceremonies. The royal village includes the queen mother's Royal Kraal, dwelling clusters, and a parade ground for ceremonies.

== Infrastructure ==
=== Law enforcement ===
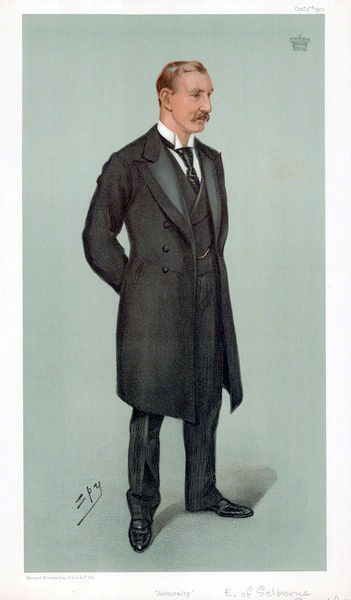
Lord Selborne, High Commissioner for South Africa signed a proclamation in 1907 for what became the Eswatini Police Force.

Lobamba has a police station and is served by The Royal Eswatini Police Service. During the British colonial era Lord Selborne, High Commissioner for South Africa signed a proclamation in 1907 for what became the Eswatini Police Force. After Eswatini's independence in 1968, the force was renamed the Royal Swaziland Police Force. Its name was further changed making it a service, rather than a force.

=== Education ===
There are four schools in Lobamba, 2 primary schools and two high schools. First, there is Lomba National High School . Also, is Lobamba National Primary School, St Mary's Primary School and St Mary's High School.

=== Health and welfare ===
The government provides health facilities to manage endemic disease and malnutrition. Retirement, disability and survivor pensions are available through its welfare system. Lobamba has two clinics: Lobamba Clinic and St Mary's Clinic that provide health services to community members but not restricted to Lobamba residents.

There is a community centre for the Youth and a care pount for children where children come to play and eat. The availability of the police station helps reduce crime in the area making it safe for people and next to it is a fire station which brings emergency services closer to the people.

=== Transportation ===
Many of the roads in Eswatini are unsurfaced, but there are good roads that connect principal towns, including the MR3 highway and MR103 road. There are small local airstrips and a railroad that operates between Eswatini and Mozambique. The Matsapha Airport is 23 kilometres (14 mi) from Lobamba. The next closest domestic and international airport is Maputo International Airport in Mozambique, which is 216 kilometres (134 mi) away.

One of the tour operators in Eswatini is Swazi Trails, which has tours of the Lobamba royal village, nature reserves, game parks, and craft centres. Nabo Bashoa runs minibus tours.

== Culture and attractions ==
City Centre Lobamba
Lobamba
1 Parliament of Eswatini
2 Somhlolo National Stadium
3 King Sobhuza II Memorial Park
4 Ludzidzini Royal Village
5 Swaziland National Museum

African Life. Some of the Sons of the Late Chief Bokweni Mamba.
National Dancing at Lobamba (1951)

=== Key attractions ===
1. Eswatini Parliament
2. Somhlolo National Stadium
3. King Sobhuza II Memorial Park
4. National Museum of Eswatini - Eswatini National Trust Commission
5. Mlilwane Wildlife Sanctuary
6. Mandzana - hot springs

=== National Museum of Eswatini ===
The National Museum of Eswatini, located in Lobamba next to the Parliament building, was built in 1972 and expanded in 1986 and 1990. The museum was made a non-profit institution in 1974 by the International Council of Museums.

The museum houses a memorial to the revered King Sobhuza II and Swazi and South African artifacts. It has a collection of photographs that include subjects of the Mbabane and Manzini Regions and British colonial administrators. A 16th-century head of Krishna, discovered nearby, is located in the natural history wing and provides evidence of trade with the east. The natural history wing includes highveld and lowveld dioramas to illustrate the diverse Eswatini ecosystems and feature rarely seen nocturnal animals. Its nature-centric exhibits integrate environmental and cultural impacts.

A recreation of a Swazi homestead is located outside the museum.

=== Somhlolo stadium ===
Also located near the Parliament building is the Somhlolo stadium for football and other major events.

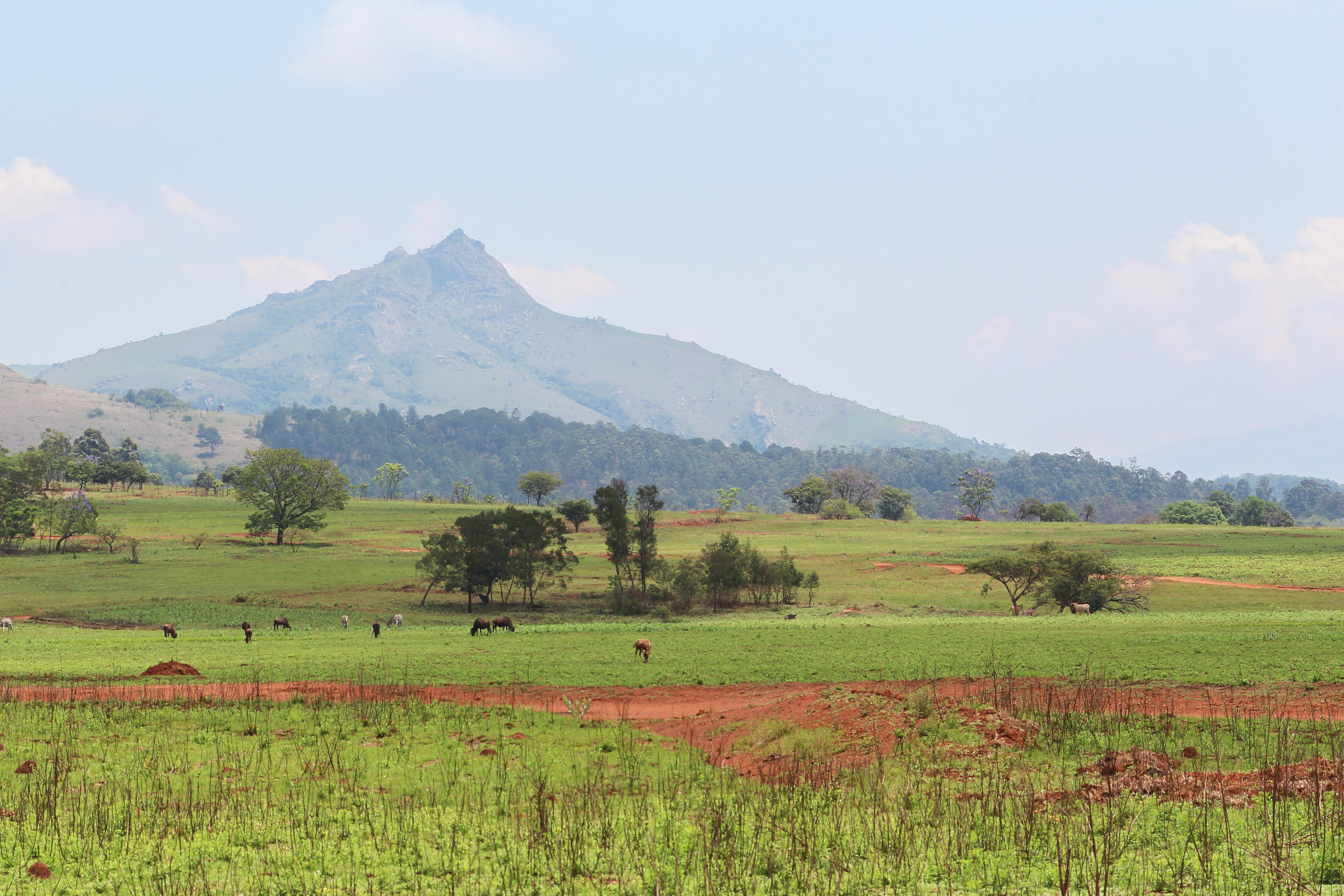
Mlilwane Wildlife Sanctuary

=== Mlilwane Wildlife Sanctuary ===
Just outside Lobamba is the Mlilwane Wildlife Sanctuary that has horseback and hiking trails, guided mountain-bike tours, rustic trail camps and camping in caves. Throughout the park are opportunities to observe game, including antelope, giraffe, zebras, and many types of birds.

=== King Sobhuza II Memorial Park ===
A memorial park was established in the memory of King Sobhuza II, who was the leader of the country's independence in 1968. The king's life is told through an exhibit of photographs. Three of the king's vintage cars are in the museum and his mausoleum is within the park.

=== Malkern Valley ===
Malkerns Valley is an arts and crafts center located seven kilometres (4 1/2 mi) south of Lobamba.

== Events ==
=== Ceremonies ===
Lobamba is famous for two ceremonies that are held there: the Reed Dance, celebrated in August and September in honour of the Queen Mother, and the Incwala, in December and January in honour of the King. These ceremonies include dancing, singing, and celebrations with traditional attire.

== See also ==
- Swaziland National Trust Commission - operates the National Museum of Eswatini
