= Swaziland Progressive Party =

Political party in Eswatini

- Leader: John Nquku
- Founded: 1959-1960
- Banned: 1973
- Ideology: Progressivism; Nationalism; Anti-racism; Human rights

The Swaziland Progressive Party was one of the first political parties founded in Swaziland. It was banned in 1973 due to the banning of all political parties.

== Background ==
A Progressive Association was founded in 1929 under the auspices of the Resident Commissioner of the British Empire. In 1935, the Association had less than 100 members. In 1939, the Association split into Swazi and non-Swazi camps. John Nquku became President of the Association in 1945.

== Party ==
The Association was transformed into a party in 1959-1960 by Nquku, who had travelled and met many European and American politicians. The party set about on the path to self-government and then independence. They were viewed as a challenge to the traditional Swazi tribal authorities. In 1962, Nquku was deposed as Party President and replaced with Ambrose Zwane. By appealing to the British government for democratic institutions to be included in the Swazi constitution, the SPP managed to secure a place in the 1964 general election. However, when the election showed widespread support in Swazi society for King Sobhuza II, the party lost influence. Following the 1972 Swazi general election, the King dissolved parliament, abolished the constitution and declared personal rule. A 1973 Royal Constitutional Commission recommended the banning of all political parties, which was agreed to by the King.

== Policies ==
The SPP had a four-point program: Non-racial universal enfranchisement, opposition to incorporation into South Africa, adoption of the United Nations Declaration of Human Rights, and integration of Swaziland's white minority and Swazi majority and ending racial discrimination.
