= Makhosini Dlamini =

Swazi Prime Minister

Prince Makhosini Jaheso Dlamini (1914 – 28 April 1978) was Prime Minister of Eswatini from 16 May 1967 to 31 March 1976.

Dlamini was also the country's foreign minister from 1968 to 1970.

== Honours ==
- Commemorative Medal of the 2500th Anniversary of the founding of the Persian Empire (Empire of Iran, 14 October 1971).

Political offices
Preceded by (–)	Prime Minister of Eswatini; 1967–1976	Succeeded by Maphevu Dlamini
