= Legislative Council of Swaziland =

Legislative body of Swaziland Protectorate 1964-1967

Type
- Type: Unicameral

History
- Founded: November 1964
- Disbanded: 1967
- Succeeded by: Parliament of Swaziland
- Seats: 28

Elections
- Last election: 1964 election

Meeting place
- Mbabane

The Legislative Council of Swaziland was the legislative body of Swaziland Protectorate from 1964 to 1967.

== History ==
Before the establishment of the Legislative Council, Swaziland never had a representative legislative body. Previously European Advisory Council had advised the British Commissioner on European affairs in Swaziland.

Legislative Council was an attempt by the British to infuse parliamentary democracy with inputs from the political class in Swaziland. Sobhuza II agreed to the formation of the Council for both Europeans and black Swazis. The Legislative Council was established in November 1964.

The 1963 constitution outlined 28 members in the Council. The British Commissioner appointed four of them. There was a provision for separate electoral rolls: one for Europeans and the other one as national. Four White Swazis were elected on the European roll and four others would be elected on the national roll. Eight members would be chosen through the traditional Tinkhundla system, which was essentially by appointment. Eight members of the Council would be elected on a national roll.

The first and only elections to the Legislative Council took place in June 1964, and resulted in an overwhelming majority of pro-monarchical pro-Sobhuza traditional and conservative elements. As a result, the Council would be replaced by a bicameral Parliament of Swaziland in 1967.

== President of the Legislative Council ==
- Arnauld Germond, 1964 - 1966. French missionary born in Basutoland, died in office in November 1966.
- John Wardle Houlton, 1966-1967
