= House of Assembly of Eswatini =

Lower chamber of Eswatini's bicameral Parliament

House of Assembly Indlu Yemhlangano
- 12th Parliament
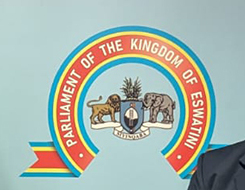

Type
- Type: Lower House of the Parliament of Eswatini

History
- Founded: 1967

Leadership
- Speaker: Jabulani Mabuza, Independent since 6 October 2023
- Deputy Speaker: Madala Mhlanga, Independent since 6 October 2023
- Prime Minister: Russell Dlamini, Independent since 7 November 2023

Structure
- Seats: 76, currently 70
- Political groups: Independents (59) Nominated (10) Attorney general (1)
- Length of term: 5 years

Elections
- Voting system: Two-round system (59 seats); Appointment by the King (10 seats)
- Last election: 29 September 2023

Meeting place
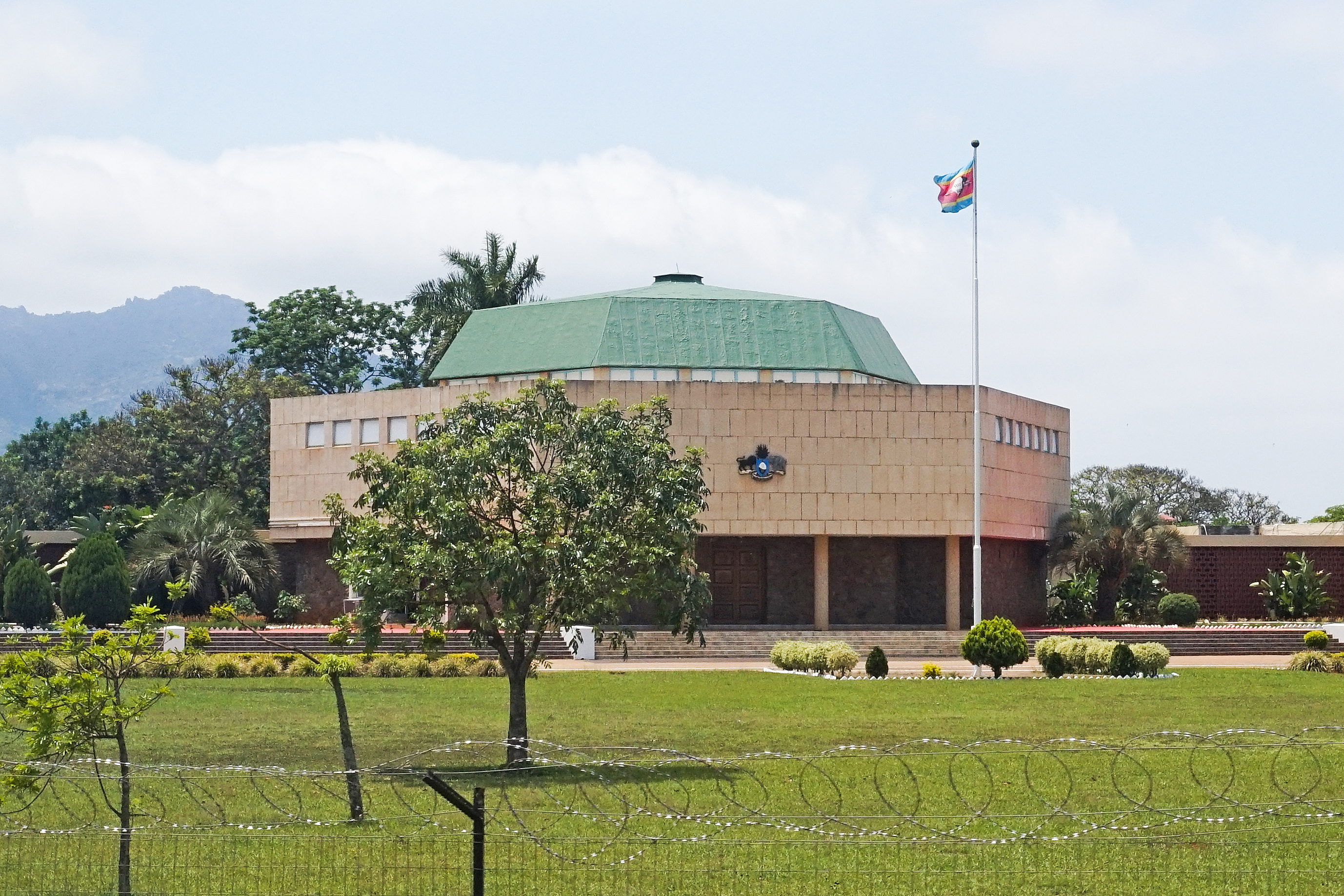
- Lobamba, Hhohho Region

Website
- parliament.gov.sz/houseofassembly/

Constitution
- Constitution of Eswatini

The House of Assembly of Eswatini is the lower chamber of the country's bicameral Parliament. The Assembly may debate and pass bills, although as the country is an absolute monarchy, the role of the legislature is mostly advisory.

== History ==
The House of Assembly was established in 1967 when the Legislative Council was disbanded and a bicameral legislature was established in the new constitution.

== Constitution ==
A maximum of seventy-six members are permitted by section 95 (1) of the Constitution. There are currently sixty-six. Fifty-five members are elected from single-member constituencies corresponding to the tinkhundlas (tribal communities). Fourteen tinkhundlas are in Hhohho District, eleven in Lubombo District, sixteen in Manzini District, and fourteen in Shiselweni District. The King appoints the other ten members, at least half of whom must be women. The sixty-sixth member is the Speaker of the House, who is elected from outside the House. If the percentage of women members falls below 30%, a maximum of four women may be elected from the administrative regions.

Each member must be a citizen of Eswatini, at least 18 years old, a registered voter, and have "paid all taxes or made arrangements satisfactory to the Commissioner of Taxes".

The House selects ten of the thirty members of the upper chamber, the Senate of Eswatini, the King appointing the rest.

== Elections ==
Candidates are first nominated at the tinkhundla level and chosen by secret ballot by the traditional chiefs. The top three finishers then proceed to a general election, also by secret ballot, in a first-past-the-post system of voting. Here, the candidate who receives the most votes from the population in each constituency is elected. All candidates run on a non-partisan basis, as political parties are banned in the country, and serve five-year terms.

Observer teams from the Commonwealth of Nations were present at the 2003, 2008 and 2013 elections.

== See also ==
- History of Eswatini
- List of national legislatures
- List of speakers of the House of Assembly of Eswatini
- Legislative branch
