= Constitution of Eswatini =

Constitution and fundamental law of Eswatini

Constitution of the Kingdom of Eswatini
- Coat of arms of Eswatini

Overview
- Jurisdiction: Eswatini

Full text
- Constitution of Eswatini at Wikisource

The 2005 constitution is currently in force. The constitution of 6 September 1968 was suspended 12 April 1973 by a State of Emergency decree imposed by King Sobhuza II, the father of the current King Mswati III. The decree gave absolute power to the monarchy and banned organised political opposition to royal rule.

A new constitution was promulgated 13 October 1978, but was not formally presented to the people.

In 2001 King Mswati III appointed a committee to draft a new constitution. The draft was released for comment in May 2003, and was strongly criticised by civil society organizations in Eswatini, as well as by Amnesty International and the International Bar Association, among others.

Amnesty International listed the following criticisms of the draft constitution of 2003:

- failure to protect fully the rights to freedom of conscience, belief, expression, opinion, peaceful assembly and association;
- failure to protect fully the right to life by, for instance, allowing law enforcement officials to use lethal force in situations where there is no threat to life posed to police or others;
- failure to include economic and social rights as rights enforceable by the courts;
- only partial protection of the rights of women, with for instance girls and young women not protected against forced marriage; and
- weak actual protection for the impartiality and independence of the judiciary, particularly regarding the selection, appointment, tenure and dismissal of judges.

A new draft was placed before the largely advisory parliament on November 4, 2004. The draft reportedly is substantially the same as the version issued in 2003.

Eswatini's two largest political organisations, the People's United Democratic Movement (PUDEMO) and the Ngwane National Liberatory Congress (NNLC), together with labour unions, challenged the 2004 draft constitution in the Eswatini's High Court. However, in March 2005 the court upheld a ban on opposition political parties, citing the 1973 State of Emergency decree of King Sobhuza II. "It remains the duty and function of the court to uphold and apply the laws of the land, and especially so when constitutional issues are decided", the court ruled. The applicants indicated that they intended to pursue their case in the Court of Appeal.

Trade unions in the country have organized repeated strikes to protest against the lack of labour and political rights and the draft constitution. This included a general strike on 25 and 26 January 2005, although reportedly not widely heeded.
