= Parliament of Eswatini =

Bicameral legislature of The Kingdom of Eswatini

Coordinates: 26.446586°S 31.206506°E

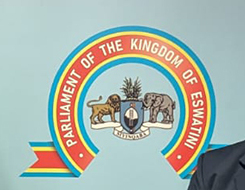

Type
- Type: Bicameral
- Houses: House of Assembly; Senate

History
- Founded: 1967

Meeting place
- Lobamba

Website
- www.gov.sz

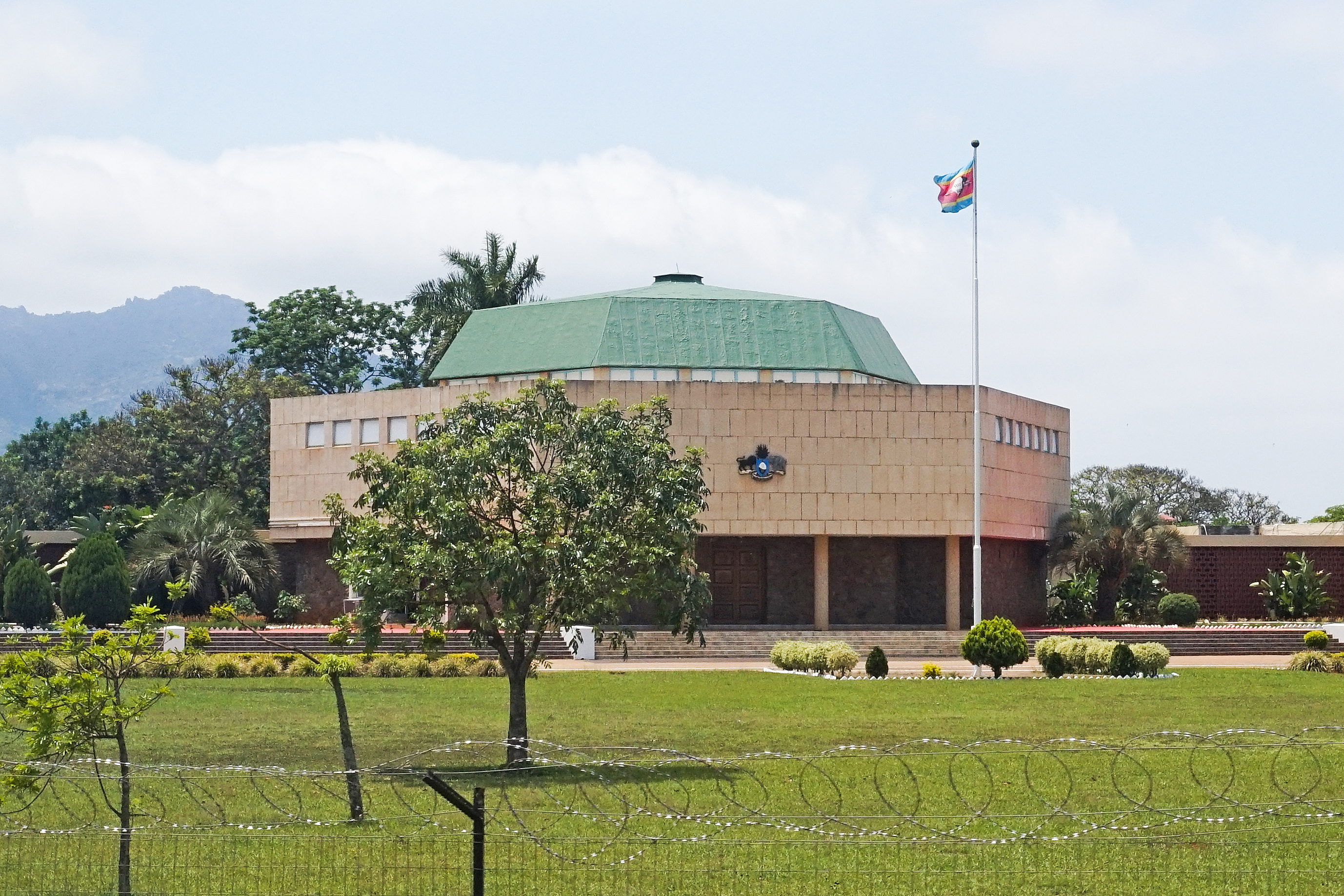
Parliament buildings in Lobamba

The Parliament of Eswatini (Swazi: Libandla) consists of two chambers:

- The Senate (Indlu yeTimphunga, Upper Chamber)
- The House of Assembly (Indlu Yemhlangano, Lower Chamber)

The Houses of Parliament are located in Lobamba.

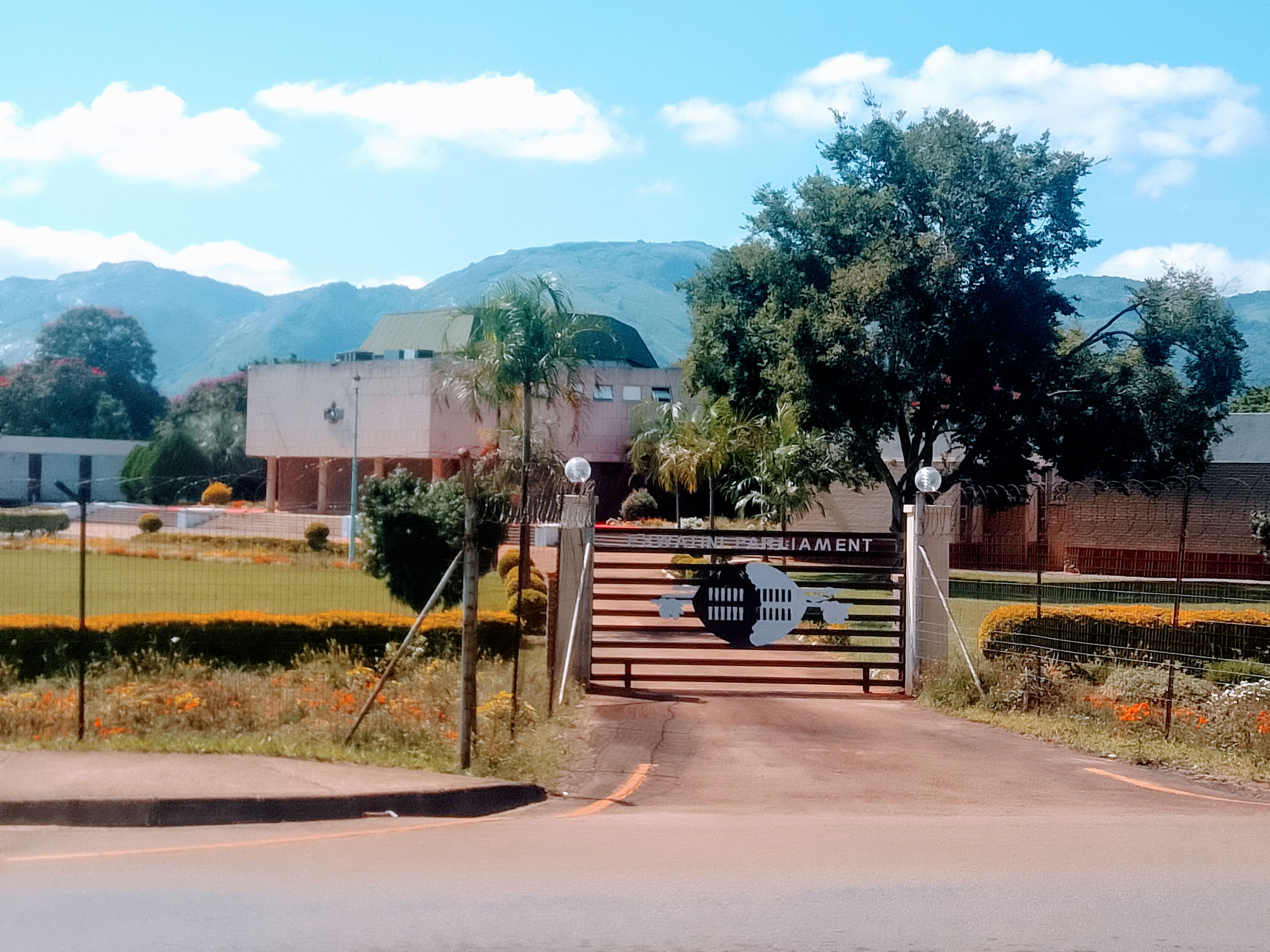
Outside the Eswatini Parliament in Lobamba

It was established in 1967 when the Legislative Council was disbanded and the bicameral parliament was established in the new constitution.

== See also ==
- Politics of Eswatini
- List of legislatures by country
