= Outline of Eswatini =

Landlocked country in Southern Africa

The flag of Eswatini

The coat of arms of Eswatini

The location of Eswatini

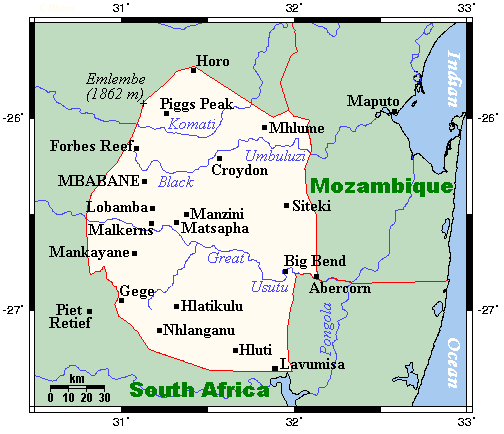
An enlargeable map of the Kingdom of Eswatini

The following outline is provided as an overview of and topical guide to Eswatini:

Eswatini (officially the Kingdom of Eswatini) – is a small, landlocked, sovereign country located in Southern Africa, bordered by South Africa on three sides except to the east, where it borders Mozambique. The country, inhabited primarily by Bantu-speaking Swazi people, is named after the 19th-century king Mswati II, from whom the people also take their name.

== General reference ==
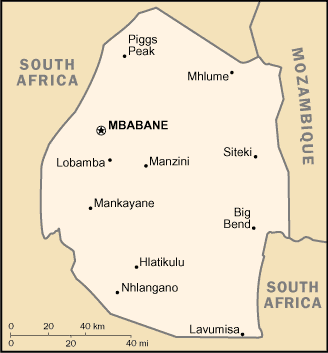
An enlargeable basic map of Eswatini

- Pronunciation: /ˌɛswɑːˈtiːni/
- Common English country name: Eswatini
- Official English country name: The Kingdom of Eswatini
- Common endonym(s): eSwatini
- Official endonym(s): The Kingdom of Eswatini
- Adjectival(s): Swazi
- Demonym(s): Swazi
- ISO country codes: SZ, SWZ, 748
- ISO region codes: See ISO 3166-2:SZ
- Country code top-level domain: .sz

== Geography of Eswatini ==
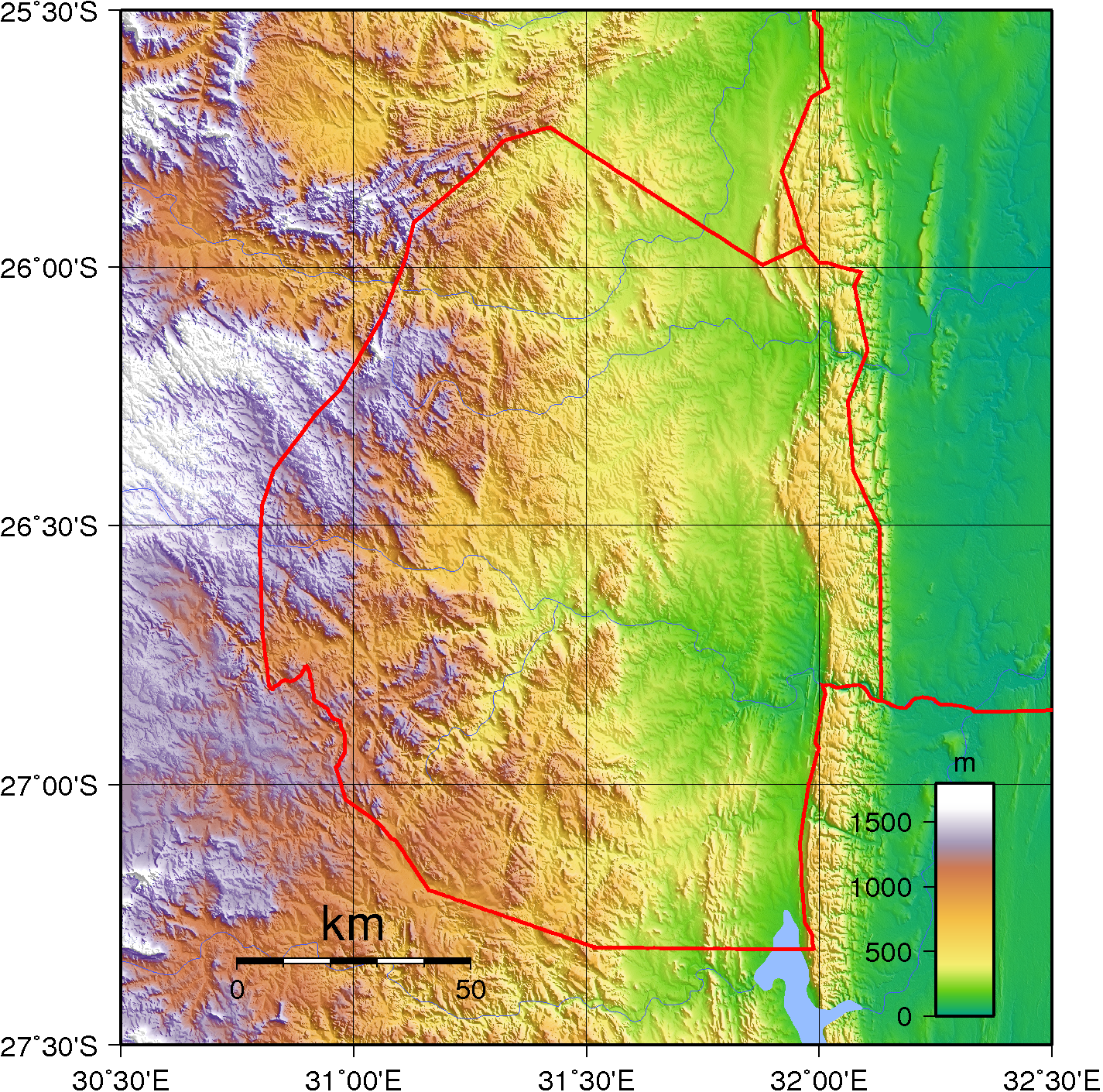
An enlargeable topographic map of Eswatini

Geography of Eswatini

- Eswatini is: a landlocked country
- Location:
  - Eastern Hemisphere and Southern Hemisphere
  - Africa
    - Southern Africa
  - Time zone: South African Standard Time (UTC+02)
  - Extreme points of Eswatini
    - High: Emlembe 1,862 m (6,109 ft)
    - Low: Maputo River 21 m (69 ft)
  - Land boundaries: 535 km

South Africa 430 km
Mozambique 105 km

- Coastline: none

- Population:: 1,467,152 - 154th most populous country
- Area: 17,364 km^{2}
- Atlas of Eswatini

=== Environment of Eswatini ===
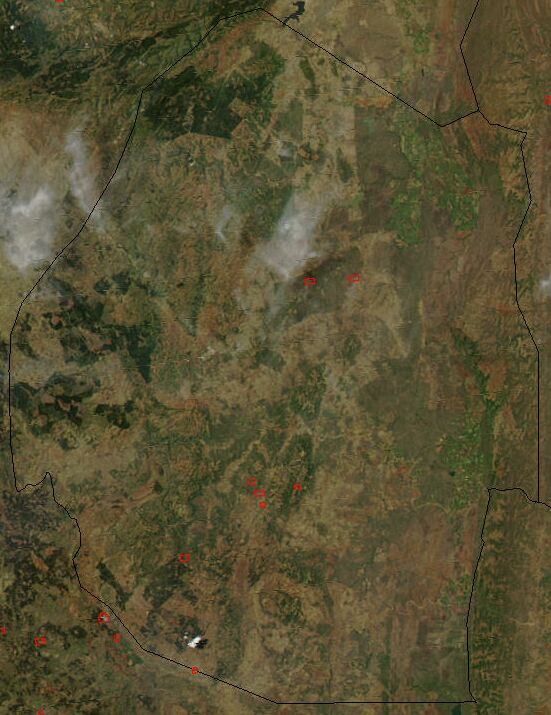
An enlargeable satellite image of Eswatini

- Climate of Eswatini
- Ecoregions in Eswatini
- Protected areas of Eswatini
  - National parks of Eswatini
- Wildlife of Eswatini
  - Fauna of Eswatini
    - Birds of Eswatini
    - Mammals of Eswatini

==== Natural geographic features of Eswatini ====
- Glaciers in Eswatini: none
- Rivers of Eswatini
- World Heritage Sites in Eswatini: None

=== Regions of Eswatini ===
Regions of Eswatini

- Hhohho
- Lubombo
- Manzini
- Shiselweni

==== Ecoregions of Eswatini ====
List of ecoregions in Eswatini

- Ecoregions in Eswatini

==== Administrative divisions of Eswatini ====
Administrative divisions of Eswatini

- Regions of Eswatini

=== Demography of Eswatini ===
Demographics of Eswatini

== Government and politics of Eswatini ==
Politics of Eswatini

- Form of government: Absolute diarchy
- Capital of Eswatini: Lobamba (royal and legislative), Mbabane (administrative)
- Elections in Eswatini
- List of political parties in Eswatini

=== Branches of the government of Eswatini ===
Government of Eswatini

==== Executive branch of the government of Eswatini ====
- Head of state: King of Eswatini, Mswati III
- Head of government: Prime Minister of Eswatini, Russell Dlamini

==== Legislative branch of the government of Eswatini ====
- Parliament of Eswatini (bicameral)
  - Upper house: Senate of Eswatini
  - Lower house: House of Commons of Eswatini

==== Judicial branch of the government of Eswatini ====
Court system of Eswatini

=== Foreign relations of Eswatini ===
Foreign relations of Eswatini

- List of diplomatic missions in Eswatini
- Diplomatic missions of Eswatini

==== International organization membership ====
The Kingdom of Eswatini is a member of:

- African, Caribbean, and Pacific Group of States (ACP)
- African Development Bank Group (AfDB)
- African Union (AU)
- Common Market for Eastern and Southern Africa (COMESA)
- Commonwealth of Nations
- Food and Agriculture Organization (FAO)
- Group of 77 (G77)
- International Bank for Reconstruction and Development (IBRD)
- International Civil Aviation Organization (ICAO)
- International Criminal Police Organization (Interpol)
- International Development Association (IDA)
- International Federation of Red Cross and Red Crescent Societies (IFRCS)
- International Finance Corporation (IFC)
- International Fund for Agricultural Development (IFAD)
- International Labour Organization (ILO)
- International Monetary Fund (IMF)
- International Olympic Committee (IOC)
- International Organization for Standardization (ISO) (correspondent)
- International Red Cross and Red Crescent Movement (ICRM)
- International Telecommunication Union (ITU)
- International Telecommunications Satellite Organization (ITSO)
- International Trade Union Confederation (ITUC)
- Multilateral Investment Guarantee Agency (MIGA)
- Nonaligned Movement (NAM)
- Organisation for the Prohibition of Chemical Weapons (OPCW)
- Permanent Court of Arbitration (PCA)
- Southern African Customs Union (SACU)
- Southern African Development Community (SADC)
- United Nations (UN)
- United Nations Conference on Trade and Development (UNCTAD)
- United Nations Educational, Scientific, and Cultural Organization (UNESCO)
- United Nations Industrial Development Organization (UNIDO)
- Universal Postal Union (UPU)
- World Customs Organization (WCO)
- World Federation of Trade Unions (WFTU)
- World Health Organization (WHO)
- World Intellectual Property Organization (WIPO)
- World Meteorological Organization (WMO)
- World Tourism Organization (UNWTO)
- World Trade Organization (WTO)

=== Law and order in Eswatini ===
Law of Eswatini

- Constitution of Eswatini
- Human rights in Eswatini
  - Abortion in Eswatini
  - LGBT rights in Eswatini
- Law enforcement in Eswatini

=== Military of Eswatini ===
Military of Eswatini

- Command
  - Commander-in-chief:
- Forces
  - Umbutfo Eswatini Defence Force
  - Air Force of Eswatini

=== Local government in Eswatini ===
Local government in Eswatini

== History of Eswatini ==
History of Eswatini

- Current events of Eswatini

== Culture of Eswatini ==
Culture of Eswatini

- Cuisine of Eswatini
- Languages of Eswatini
- National symbols of Eswatini
  - Coat of arms of Eswatini
  - Flag of Eswatini
  - National anthem of Eswatini
- People of Eswatini
- Prostitution in Eswatini
- Public holidays in Eswatini
- Religion in Eswatini
  - Hinduism in Eswatini
  - Islam in Eswatini
  - Sikhism in Eswatini
- World Heritage Sites in Eswatini: None

=== Art in Eswatini ===
- Music of Eswatini

=== Media in Eswatini ===
- Swazi Media Commentary

=== Sports in Eswatini ===
Sports in Eswatini

- Football in Eswatini
- Eswatini at the Olympics

== Economy and infrastructure of Eswatini ==
Economy of Eswatini

- Economic rank, by nominal GDP (2025): 160th (one hundred and sixtieth)
- Telecommunications in Eswatini
  - Internet in Eswatini
- List of companies of Eswatini
- Currency of Eswatini: Swazi lilangeni (SZL)
- Health in Eswatini
- Mining in Eswatini
- Eswatini Stock Market
- Tourism in Eswatini
- Transport in Eswatini
  - List of airports in Eswatini
  - Rail transport in Eswatini

== Education in Eswatini ==
Education in Eswatini

== See also ==
- Eswatini
- List of international rankings
- Member state of the Commonwealth of Nations
- Member state of the United Nations
- Outline of Africa
