= LGBTQ rights in Eswatini =

- Eswatini
- Legal status: Male: illegal since 1907 (unenforced, repeal proposed); Female: never criminalised
- Gender identity: No
- Military: No
- Discrimination protections: Limited protection against hate speech based on sexual orientation/preference.

Family rights
- Recognition of relationships: No recognition of same-sex unions
- Adoption: No

Lesbian, gay, bisexual, transgender, and queer (LGBTQ) people in Eswatini have limited legal rights. According to Rock of Hope, a Swati LGBTQ advocacy group, "there is no legislation recognising LGBTIs or protecting the right to a non-heterosexual orientation and gender identity and as a result [LGBTQ people] cannot be open about their orientation or gender identity for fear of rejection and discrimination." Male homosexuality is illegal in Eswatini, though this law is unenforced in practice. According to the 2021 Human Rights Practices Report from the US Department of State, "there has never been an arrest or prosecution for consensual same-sex conduct."

Despite the absence of legal enforcement against same-sex sexual activity, LGBTQ people in Eswatini regularly face societal discrimination and harassment, including violence. As such, most choose to remain in the closet or move to neighbouring South Africa. However, Eswatini has a higher than average tolerance of LGBTQ people compared to most other African countries. Eswatini's first pride parade was held in June 2018.

== Laws regarding same-sex sexual acts ==
According to Section 252(1) of the Constitution of the Kingdom of Eswatini, the principles and rules of Roman-Dutch common law that have applied to Eswatini since 22 February 1907 (as those principles and rules existed on 6 September 1968, Independence Day) are applied and enforced as the common law of Eswatini. The principal source of this common law in 1907 was the common law as then applied in the Transvaal Colony, which ultimately became a part of South Africa. Sodomy, defined as same-sex sexual relations between men, was a crime under the 1907 common law, punishable with either death or a lesser punishment at the discretion of the court.

By the mid-twentieth century, "sodomy" in South Africa had been defined by its courts as "unlawful and intentional sexual relations per anum between two human males." This narrow definition left out a residual group of proscribed "unnatural sexual acts" referred to generally as "an unnatural offence", which included at a minimum those sexual acts between men that did not involve anal penetration and apparently never included sexual acts between women. Whether these developments in South Africa had an effect on Eswatini's common law is uncertain. The International Lesbian, Gay, Bisexual, Trans and Intersex Association (ILGA) asserts that Eswatini's definition of "sodomy" is the same as South Africa's and that female same-sex sexual acts are legal.

Eswatini's sodomy law is in practice not enforced. The Minister of Justice has repeatedly stated that their policy is not to prosecute consenting adults. There are no known arrests or prosecutions for consensual same-sex sexual activity. Nevertheless, LGBTQ groups have been critical of this approach: "To us, it sounds like holding a gun and saying your policy is not to shoot." They have argued that the only way to repeal the country's sodomy law is to go through the courts.

Following the repeal of Botswana's sodomy law in June 2019, an editorial for the human rights website Swazi Media Commentary, republished in AllAfrica, called on Eswatini to follow suit. The editorial noted, however, that differences between the two countries—Botswana is a democracy, while Eswatini is an absolute monarchy—were likely to make such a transition difficult in Eswatini's case. The author, Richard Rooney, pointed out that Eswatini has a poor human rights record and political parties are banned there. As a consequence, in his view, there is very little opportunity for discussion and debate, in contrast to the Botswana experience. The kingdom's monarch is believed to be strongly opposed to repeal—he has been widely reported as having described (Note: The king has applied this descriptor in at least one other context. In 2021, Mswati III also called pro-democracy protests against his rule "satanic": "The country views that conduct as satanic," he said.) homosexuality as "satanic." As he must authorise all laws passed by Parliament before they can come into effect, the courts may be the most likely avenue for repeal of the country's sodomy law.

== Recognition of same-sex relationships ==
There is no legal recognition of same-sex relationships.

== Adoption and family planning ==
Same-sex couples are prohibited from adopting children. Otherwise, prospective adoptive heterosexual parents may be single, married, or divorced.

== Discrimination protections ==
There are no broad legal protections against discrimination based on sexual orientation or gender identity in areas such as education, health, housing and employment. However, some limited protections are in place:

- Section 4.3 on "Family Planning" of the National Policy on Sexual and Reproductive Health, issued in 2013, states that the Ministry of Health shall "Create an enabling environment to ensure availability and accessibility of family planning information and services to all persons regardless of sex, gender, age, status, sexual orientation and religion according to their needs."
- The National Guidelines for Adolescent Sexual and Reproductive Health, issued in 2021, states that Right to Equality includes, among other things, freedom from discrimination because of one’s sex or sexual orientation. Section 5.2 states that "Gender-based violence refers to violence that is directed at an individual based on his/her biological sex, gender identity or perceived adherence to socially defined norms of masculinity and feminity." Section 5.5 states that LGBT people are one of the key population that are at Higher Risk of Gender-Based Violence.
- The National Social Security Policy, issued in November 2021 by the Ministry Labour and Social Security, defines Equity as "the fair distribution of resources, free from discrimination based on age, disability, race, gender, ethnicity, socio-economic background, religion, sexual orientation and any other basis."
- The National Strategy to End Violence 2023-2027 states that the implementation of this strategy will be guided by the fundamental principles such as inclusivity which means "To embrace diversity and acknowledge risk by sex, age, poverty status, disability, and sexual orientation or identity."

In 2012, former Minister of Foreign Affairs Mgwagwa Gamedze rejected a call by a United Nations working group to put up a law protecting LGBTQ people. Gamedze said so few, if any, gays live in Eswatini that the bother of drafting such a law was not worth the effort.

In May 2017, the United Nations Human Rights Committee submitted a series of questions to the Swazi Government dealing with LGBTQ rights. The Committee wanted to know what measures have been put in place "to protect persons from discrimination and violence based on sexual orientation and gender identity, including in housing and employment, and to promote tolerance." Additionally, the Committee questioned Eswatini's adherence to the International Covenant on Civil and Political Rights, which protects private adult consensual sexual activity, and expressed concern that violence against LGBTQ people is widespread.

=== Hate speech ===
Section 10.2(2) on "Violence and Hate speech" of the Broadcasting Guidelines Services 2017, issued by The Eswatini Communications Commission (ESCCOM), states "Broadcasting service licensees must not broadcast material which, judged within context, sanctions, promotes or glamorises violence or unlawful conduct based on race, national or ethnic origin, colour, religion, gender, sexual orientation, age or mental or physical disability." These guidelines apply to all Radio and Television broadcasting service providers.

Section 8(1)(d) of The Broadcasting (Content) Guidelines 2022 states that "A licensee shall ensure that no broadcasts by its station is likely to incite, violence, perpetuate hatred, vilify any person or section of the community, on account of race, ethnicity, nationality, gender, sexual preference, age, disability, religion or culture of that person or section of the community." These Guidelines apply to all broadcasters and content service providers.

== Living conditions ==
The United States Department of State's 2011 Human Rights Report found that:

Societal discrimination against the LGBT community was prevalent [in 2011], and LGBT persons generally concealed their sexual orientation and gender identity. Colonial-era legislation against sodomy remains on the books; however, it has not been used to arrest gay men. Gay men and lesbians who were open about their sexual orientation and relationships faced censure and exclusion from the chiefdom-based patronage system, which could result in eviction from one's home. Chiefs, pastors, and members of government criticized same-sex sexual conduct as neither Swazi nor Christian. Societal discrimination exists against gay men and lesbians, and LGBT advocacy organizations had trouble registering with the government. One such organization, House of Pride, was affiliated with another organization dealing with HIV/AIDS. It is difficult to know the extent of employment discrimination based on sexual orientation because victims are not likely to come forward, and most gay men and lesbians are not open about their sexual orientation.

=== Positions of government officials ===
King Mswati III, one of the last absolute monarchs in the world, has reportedly called same-sex relationships "satanic" and former Prime Minister Barnabas Sibusiso Dlamini has called homosexuality "an abnormality and a sickness."

In 2009, Mangosuthu Simanga Dlamini, president of the Gays and Lesbians Association of Eswatini (Galeswa), was personally invited to the opening of the ninth Swati Parliament.

In February 2012, Swazi public health officials used a Valentine's Day campaign to urge gays to trust promises of confidentiality and test for HIV. Deputy Director of Health Simon Zwane acknowledged that in Swazi society gay sex is taboo but said that the Health Ministry was actively extending its reach to include same-sex couples in HIV counselling and testing. The move was applauded by LGBTQ groups who considered it a big step in acknowledging the existence of LGBTQ people.

In June 2012, Prime Minister Barnabas Sibusiso Dlamini said that "church clergy say this (LGBTQ relationships) is not biblically acceptable. It is just now that some countries and communities allow it. It is still scary here in Eswatini when we see it happen. The country's laws do not allow this." The Prime Minister also said that "people of the same sex cannot even go to regional offices to get married. It will take time before we allow this to happen and include it in the country's laws. We are not even ready to consider it." In 2014, Press Secretary Percy Simelane told The Swazi Observer that the Government "has been closely monitoring the situation with a view to take a legal position."

=== Societal discrimination and incidents ===
Reports of discrimination, harassment and violence against LGBTQ people are not uncommon in Eswatini. In March 2015, a 26-year-old lesbian woman from Nhlangano was murdered by a man who did not want to be in the presence of lesbians. A few months earlier, a gay man was also murdered in the town.

In March 2019, a pastor for an unknown church was suspended after being accused of being bisexual.

In June 2019, officials refused to register Eswatini Sexual and Gender Minorities (ESGM) "on the grounds of morality." Melusi Simelane, the group's founder, took legal action to challenge the rejection. The matter was heard in 2020 and in 2022 the High Court, in a split decision, upheld the decision to deny registration. While doing so, the court also accepted that the constitution protects the rights of LGBTQ persons to freedom of association, privacy and expression.

=== Activism ===
Eswatini's first pride parade was held in June 2018 in Mbabane and was organised by Rock of Hope. The event began with a march (with police protection), following by a picnic and a party. About a thousand people attended. The event received considerable international and domestic media coverage, appearing on the front page of both major Swazi newspapers. U.S. Ambassador to Eswatini Lisa J. Peterson attended the march.

Rock of Hope is an LGBTQ advocacy group, which seeks to raise awareness of the discrimination and stigmatisation faced by members of the LGBTQ community, to prevent the transmission of HIV/AIDS and to promote acceptance of LGBTQ people by society and by themselves. It was founded in 2012. It is also active in undertaking charity works in local communities.

In November 2018, activists released a documentary focusing on the lives of a gay man, Mlando, a lesbian, Alex, and a transgender woman, Polycarp, in Eswatini. The documentary, called "Fighting For Pride: Swaziland", discusses the prejudices they face, the reactions of their families and the signification of LGBTQ activism.

In December 2018, a branch of the Ark of Joy International Ministry, a religious organisation, was relaunched in Coates Valley. The church welcomes gay and lesbian members. A spokesman for Rock of Hope said, "It is worth noting that many in the religious circles, continue to spew hate speech and show utter disregard for the deeds of the Lord, by being judgmental and expelling some of the LGBTI community from their places of worship. It is for that reason, we welcome the opening of such churches as those that show the love of God, and preach the spirit of oneness and togetherness."

The country's second pride event was held on 22 June 2019. The event, described as a "joyful success", included participants signing traditional Swati songs.

== Public opinion ==
According to a 2013 survey, 43% of lesbian and transgender respondents had tried to commit suicide within the past year, and 78% regularly took "intoxicating substances to feel normal and forget."

A 2016 poll found that 26% of Swazis would like or not mind having an LGBTQ neighbor.

A 2019 survey showed that 59% of LGBTQ Swazis had been discriminated against or treated disrespectfully at public health facilities, with 30% being denied healthcare services.

== Summary table ==
Same-sex sexual activity legal	No Illegal between males (unenforced, repeal proposed); never criminalised between females
Equal age of consent	No
Anti-discrimination laws in employment only	No
Anti-discrimination laws in the provision of goods and services	No
Anti-discrimination laws in all other areas (Incl. indirect discrimination, hate speech)	No / Yes (hate speech ban based on sexual orientation, only in broadcasting)
Same-sex marriages	No
Recognition of same-sex couples	No
Stepchild adoption by same-sex couples	No
Joint adoption by same-sex couples	No
LGBTQ people allowed to serve openly in the military	No
Right to change legal gender	Yes (since 1984)
Access to IVF for lesbians	No
Commercial surrogacy for gay male couples	No
MSMs allowed to donate blood	Yes

== See also ==
- Human rights in Eswatini
- LGBTQ rights in Africa
