= Culture of Eswatini =

Swazi culture is the way of life and customs of the Swazi people through various historical stages. The culture of Swazi people involves music, food, religion, architecture, and kinship, among many other things. The Swazi people are composed of various Nguni clans who speak the Nguni language siSwati. These people mostly reside in Eswatini and South Africa. Presently, Swazi people may also include citizens of Eswatini. In Eswatini, one of the most visible features of cultural identity is the traditional political structure of the nation and the home. In the national level, the iNgwenyama (the "Lion", or King) is considered the head of the nation alongside the iNdlovukati (the "She-Elephant", or Queen Mother) who is the spiritual leader of the nation. National cultural events often involve the iNgwenyama or iNdlovukati. At home, the patriarch of the family is the head and often practices polygamy. This headman, usually referred to as umnumzane is central to all activities of the home. A group of homes forming a community and the land they reside on forms a chiefdom or umphakatsi. Several chiefdoms form an inkhundla which then belongs of a regional division of the country. This connects the older traditional leadership structures to more modern forms of government.

There are national cultural events such as umhlanga, emaganu and incwala which take place at Royal residences of the iNgwenyama and iNdlovukati. Local cultural events in communities or imiphakatsi, take place at the residence of the chief also called umphakatsi. Weddings, funerals and religious events are usually carried out at family homesteads where neighbors are usually invited to partake.

== Swazi kinship ==
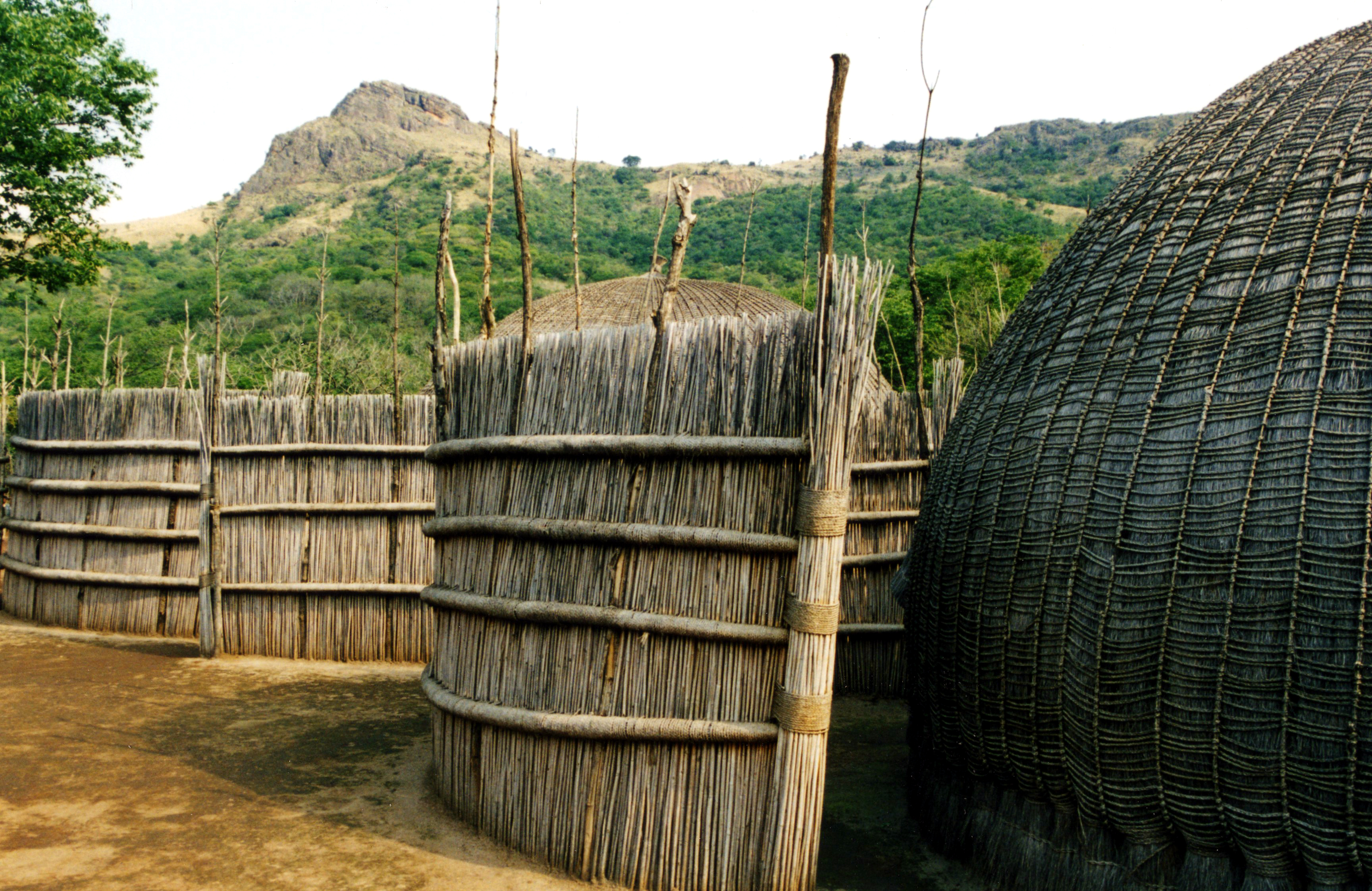
A traditional homestead in Eswatini.

The principal Swazi social unit is the homestead, a traditional beehive hut thatched with dry grass. In a polygamous homestead, each wife has her own hut and yard surrounded by reed fences. There are three structures for sleeping, cooking, and storage (brewing beer). In larger homesteads there are also structures used as bachelors' quarters and guest accommodation.

Central to the traditional homestead is the cattle byre, or kraal, a circular area enclosed by large logs inter-spaced with branches. The cattle byre has ritual as well as practical significance as a store of wealth and symbol of prestige. It contains sealed grain pits. Facing the cattle byre is the great hut which is occupied by the mother of the headman.

The headman is central to all homestead affairs and he is often polygamous. He leads through example and advises his wives on all social affairs of the home as well as seeing to the larger survival of the family. He also spends time socialising with the young boys, who are often his sons or close relatives, advising them on the expectations of growing up and manhood.

== Traditional healers ==
The Sangoma is a traditional diviner chosen by the ancestors of that particular family. The training of the Sangoma is called "kwetfwasa". At the end of the training, a graduation ceremony takes place where all the local sangoma come together for feasting and dancing. The diviner is consulted for various reasons, such the cause of sickness or even death. His diagnosis is based on "kubhula", a process of communication, through trance, with the natural super-powers. The Inyanga (a medical and pharmaceutical specialist in western terms) possesses the bone throwing skill ("kushaya ematsambo") used to determine the cause of the sickness.

== Amasimba ==
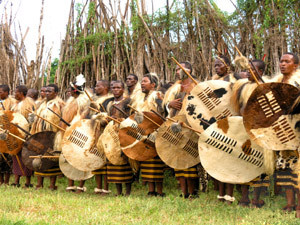
Swazi warriors at the incwala ceremony.

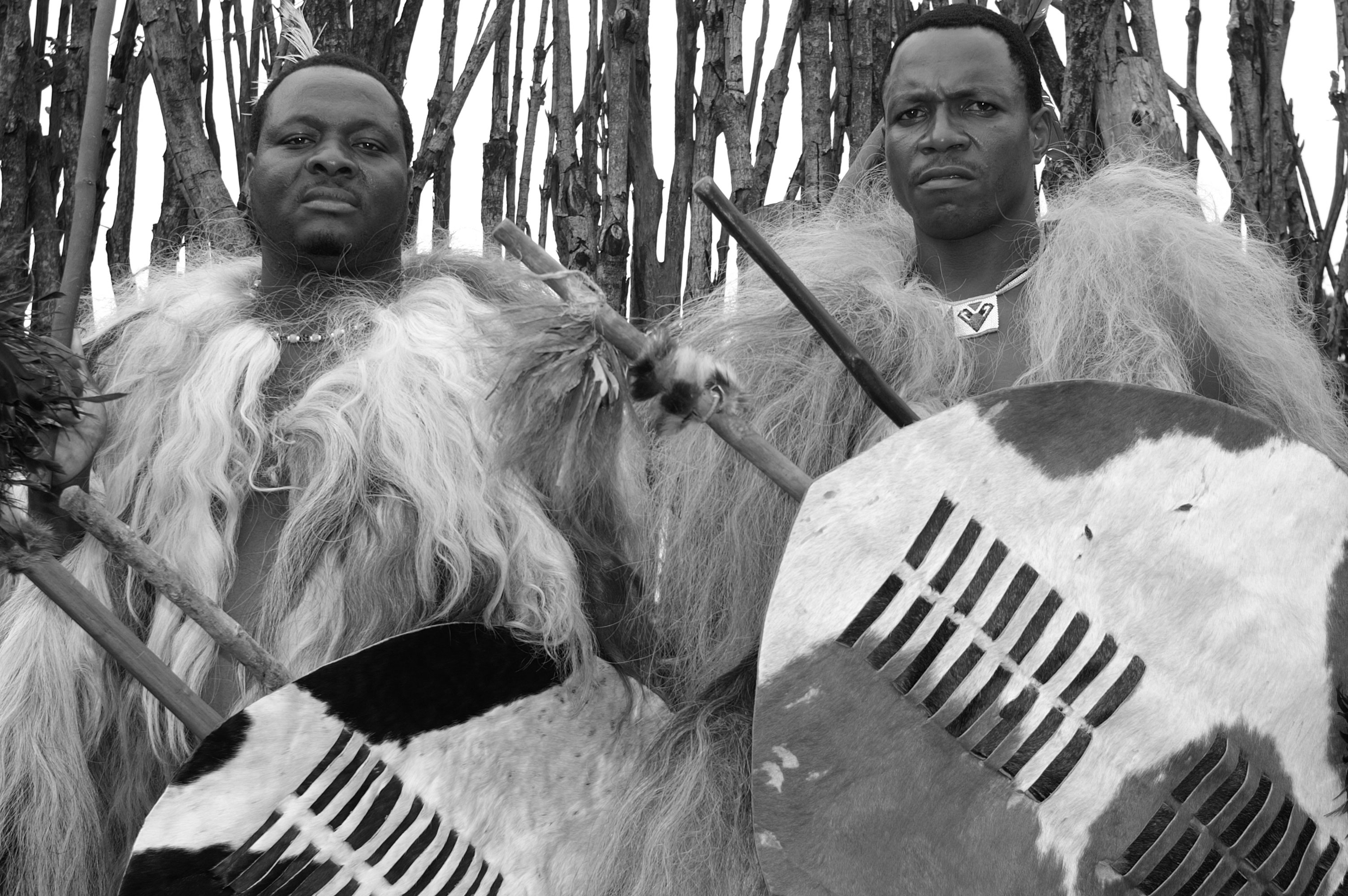
Warriors in full incwala dress.

The most important cultural event in Eswatini is the Incwala ceremony. It is held on the fourth day after the full moon nearest the longest day, 21 December. Incwala is often translated in English as 'first fruits ceremony', but the King's tasting of the new harvest is only one aspect among many in this long pageant. Incwala is best translated as Kingship Ceremony. When there is no king, there is no Incwala. It is high treason for any other person to hold an Incwala.

Every Swazi may take part in the public parts of the Incwala. The climax of the event is the fourth day of the Big Incwala. The key figures are the King, Queen Mother, royal wives and children, the royal governors (indunas), the chiefs, the regiments, and the "bemanti" or "water people".

== Umhlanga ==
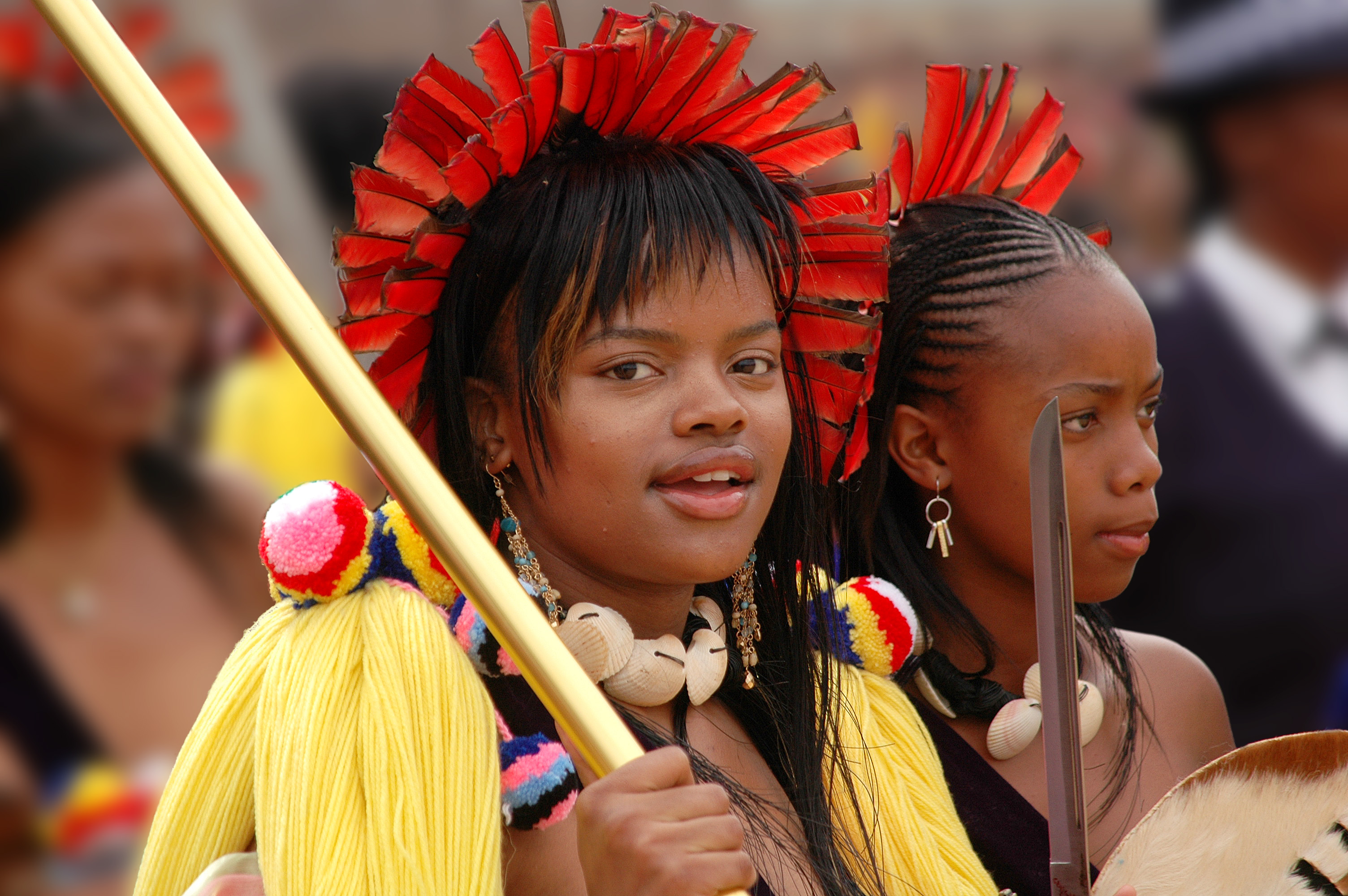
Princess Sikhanyiso Dlamini at the reed dance.

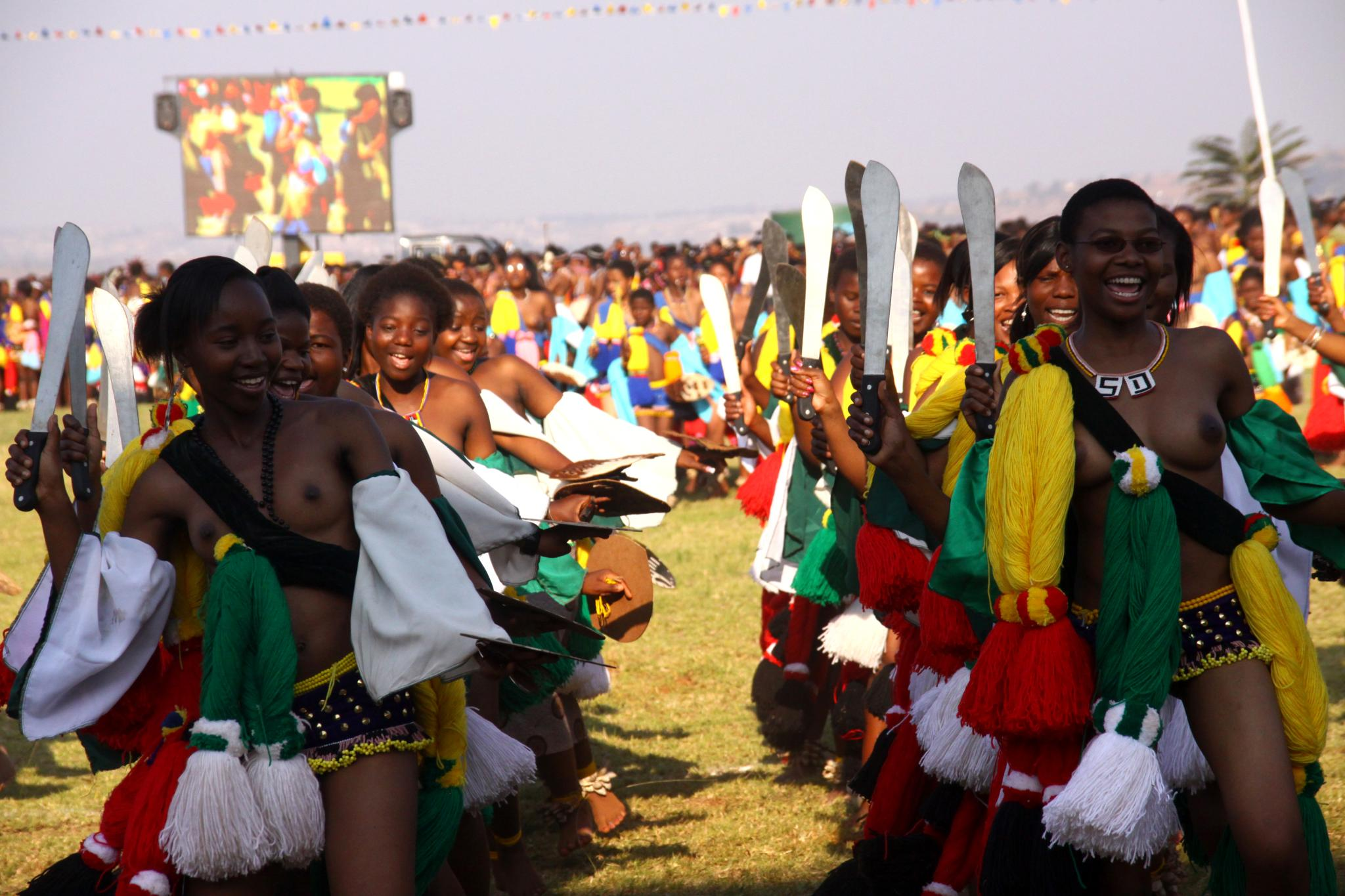
Girls dancing at the 2010 reed dance.

Eswatini's best-known cultural event is the annual Umhlanga Reed Dance. In the eight-day ceremony, girls cut reeds, present them to the Queen Mother and then dance. (There is no formal competition.) It is done in late August or early September. Only childless, unmarried girls can take part. The aims of the ceremony are to preserve girls' chastity, provide tribute labour for the Queen Mother and to encourage solidarity by working together. The royal family appoints a commoner maiden to be "induna" (captain) of the girls and she announces over the radio the dates of the ceremony. She will be an expert dancer and knowledgeable on royal protocol. One of the King's daughters will be her counterpart.

The Reed Dance today is not an ancient ceremony but a development of the old "umchwasho" custom. In "umchwasho", all young girls were placed in a female age-regiment. If any girl became pregnant outside of marriage, her family paid a fine of one cow to the local chief. After a number of years, when the girls had reached a marriageable age, they would perform labour service for the Queen Mother, ending with dancing and feasting. The country was under the chastity rite of "umchwasho" until 19 August 2005.

== Music ==
The makhweyane is a traditional Swazi instrument; it is a single-stringed, gourd-resonated musical bow.

== Arts and crafts ==
Swazi art varies from pottery to jewellery among many other things. Historically Swazi people have made jewellery and clothing items from beads. An example of this is ligcebesha, a colourful necklace and indlamu and colourful skirt for girls. Historical pottery in Eswatini includes mostly clay pots that are used for carrying water, beer cooking and decorations. These clay pots are called tindziwo. Wooden sculptures were also very popular as utensils, for example umcwembe used for serving meat. Swazis also made a lot of items using special grasses. These include grass mats called emacansi and tihlantsi. Other grass items are brooms, baskets among others.

Eswatini is also known for a strong presence in the handcrafts industry. The formalised handcraft businesses of Eswatini employ over 2,500 people, many of whom are women (per TechnoServe Swaziland Handcrafts Impact Study," February 2011). The products are unique and reflect the culture of Eswatini, ranging from housewares, to artistic decorations, to complex glass, stone, or wood artwork.

== Sports culture in Eswatini ==
The sport of football is the most popular sport in the country of Eswatini. It is run by the Eswatini Football Association. The association administers the Eswatini national football team, as well as the Premier League of Eswatini.

=== Stadiums in Eswatini ===
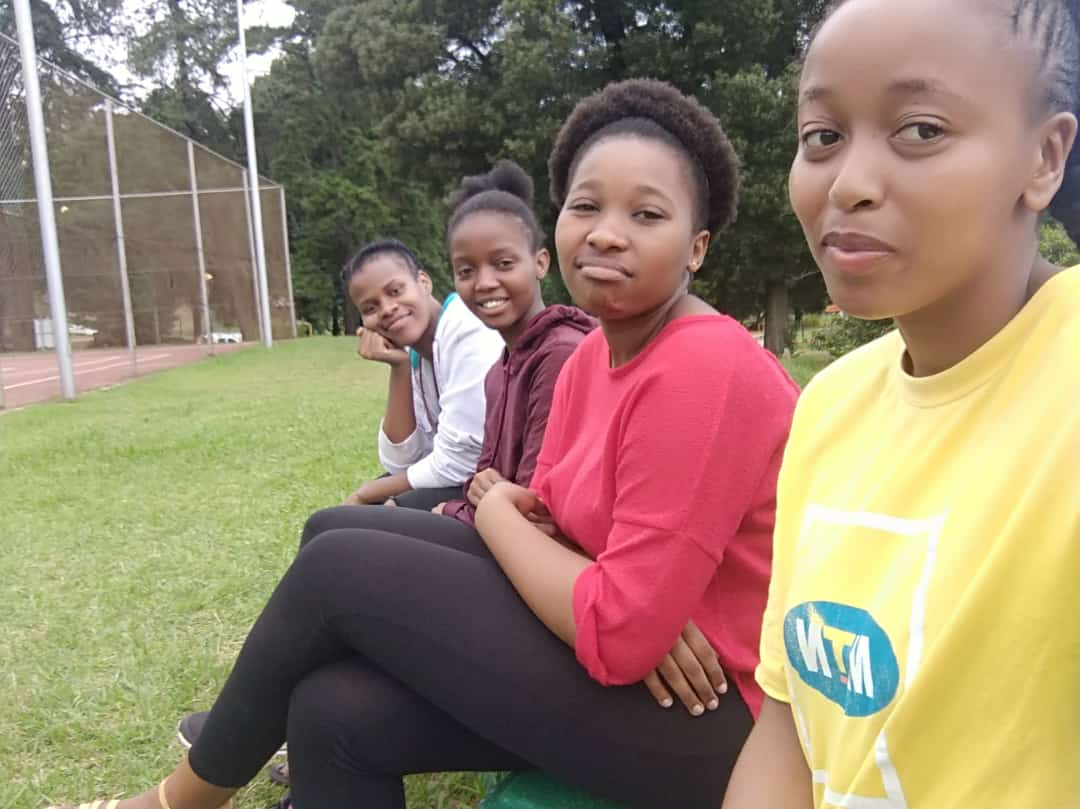
Female Eswatini basketball team members.

Stadium	Capacity	City	Tenants	Image
Somhlolo National Stadium	20,000	Lobamba	Eswatini national football team	

== See also ==
- Outline of Eswatini
- Religion in Eswatini
- Lists of stadiums
