= Ezulwini Mosque =

Mosque in Lobamba, Hhohho, Eswatini

- Location of the mosque in Eswatini

Religion
- Affiliation: Islam
- Branch/tradition: Sunni
- Ecclesiastical or organisational status: Mosque
- Status: Active

Location
- Location: Lobamba, Hhohho
- Country: Eswatini
- Coordinates: 26°23′57″S 31°10′10″E

Architecture
- Type: Mosque architecture
- Completed: 1978
- Capacity: 370 worshipers

The Ezulwini Mosque is a Sunni Islam mosque in Lobamba, Hhohho Region, Eswatini.

== Overview ==
The mosque was constructed in 1978 and has capacity for 370 worshipers.

== See also ==
- Islam in Eswatini
