= List of companies of Eswatini =

Location of Eswatini

Eswatini is a sovereign state in Southern Africa. Eswatini is a developing country with a small economy. Its GDP per capita of $9,714 means it is classified as a country with a lower-middle income. As a member of the Southern African Customs Union (SACU) and Common Market for Eastern and Southern Africa (COMESA), its main local trading partner is South Africa. Eswatini's currency, the lilangeni, is pegged to the South African rand. Eswatini's major overseas trading partners are the United States and the European Union. The majority of the country's employment is provided by its agricultural and manufacturing sectors. Eswatini is a member of the Southern African Development Community (SADC), the African Union, the Commonwealth of Nations and the United Nations.

== Notable firms ==
This list includes notable companies with primary headquarters located in the country. The industry and sector follow the Industry Classification Benchmark taxonomy. Organizations which have ceased operations are included and noted as defunct.

Notable companies Status: P=Private, S=State; A=Active, D=Defunct
Name	Industry	Sector	Headquarters	Founded	Notes	Status	
Aero Africa	Consumer services	Airlines	Manzini	2003	Charter airline, defunct 2009	P	D
Central Bank of Eswatini	Financials	Banks	Mbabane	1974	Central bank	S	A
Royal Swazi National Airways	Consumer services	Airlines	Manzini	1978	Airline, defunct 1999	P	D
Swazi Express Airways	Consumer services	Airlines	Matsapha	1995	Airline, defunct 2008	P	D
Eswatini Railways	Industrials	Railroads	Mbabane	1963	Railway	S	A
Eswatini Airlink	Consumer services	Airlines	Matsapha	1999	Airline	P	D
Eswatini Posts and Telecommunications	Telecommunications	Fixed line telecommunications	Mbabane	1986		S	A
Eswatini Stock Exchange	Financials	Investment services	Mbabane	1990	Primary exchange	P	A
Tibiyo Taka Ngwane	Conglomerates	-	Kwaluseni	1968	Media, sugar, real estate	P	A

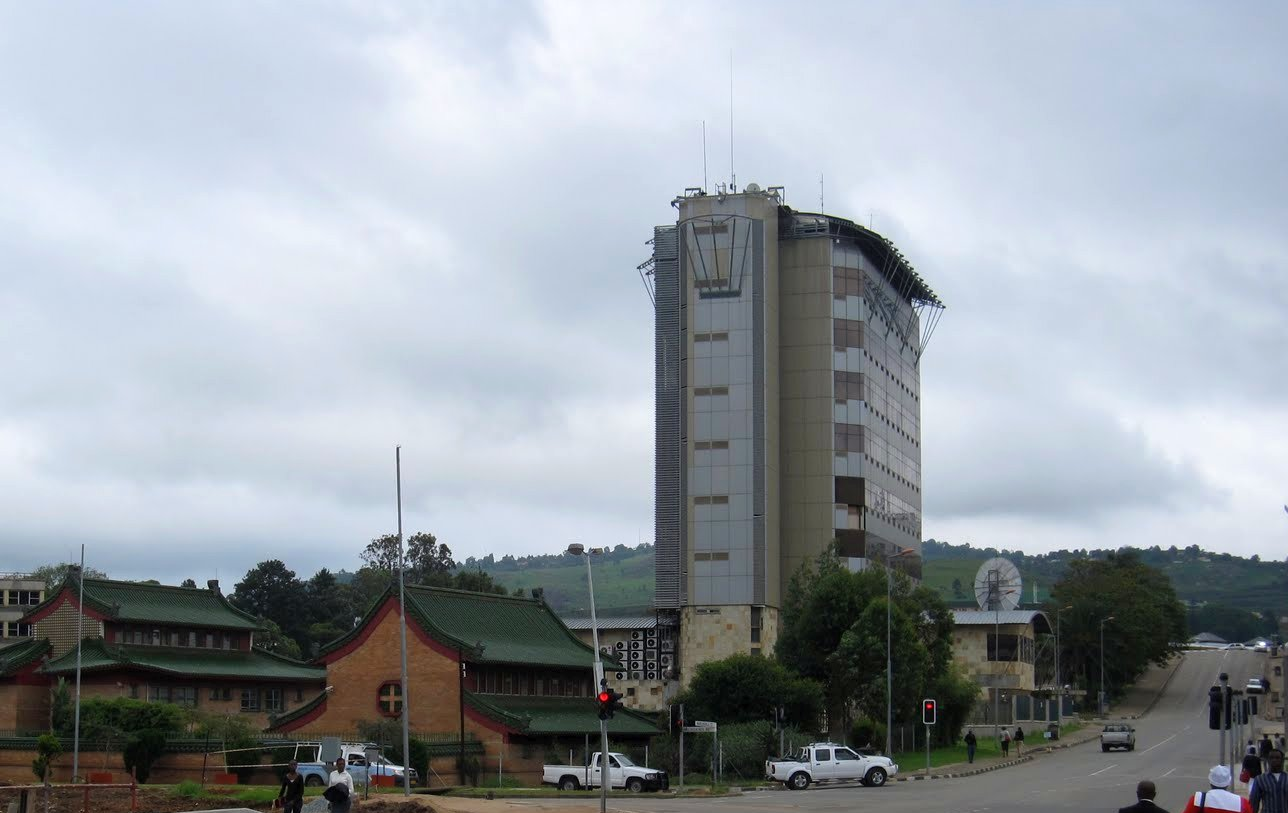
Central bank in Mbabane.

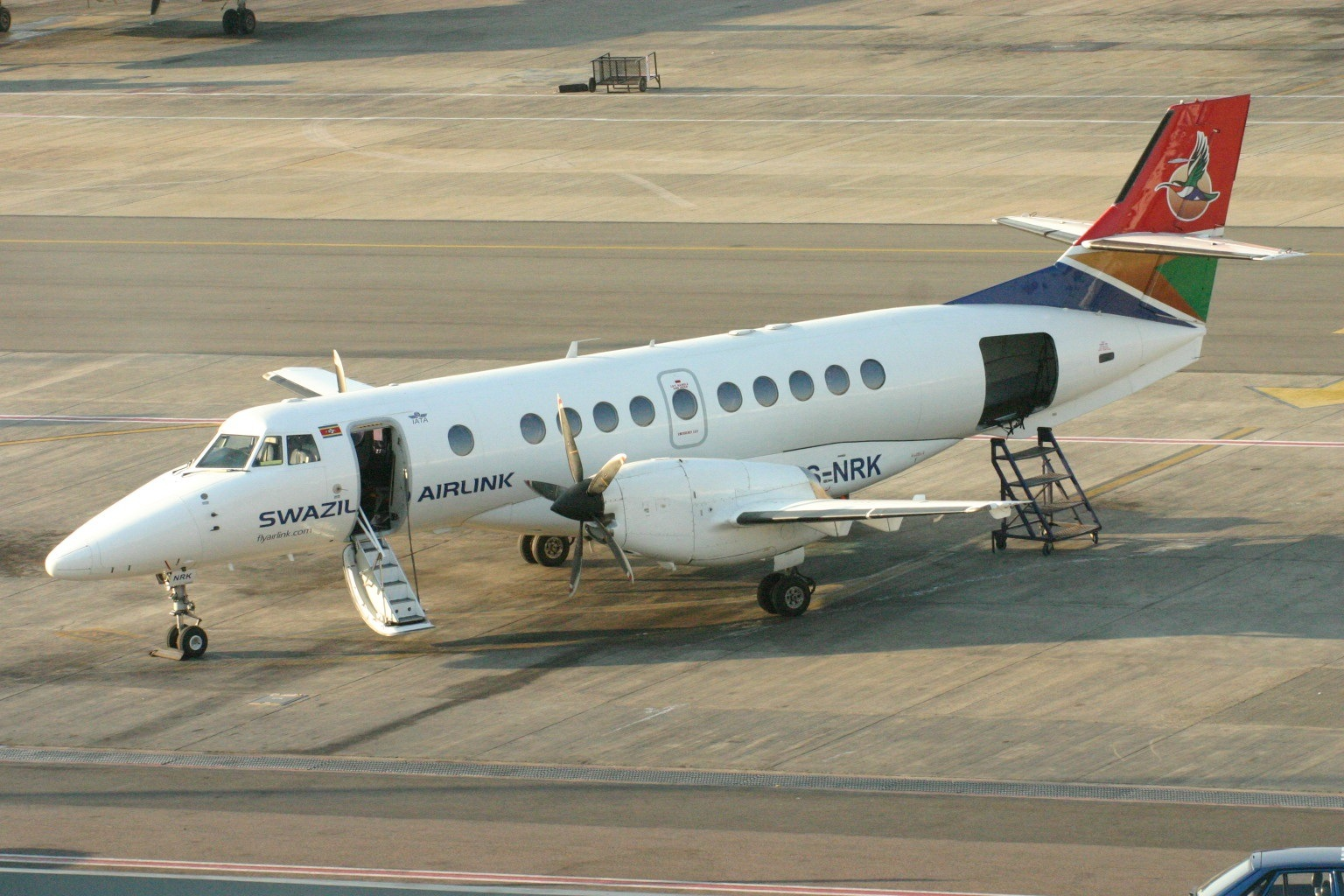
Eswatini Airlink Jetstream.

== See also ==
- List of banks in Eswatini
- List of airlines of Eswatini
