= Cuisine of Eswatini =

Culinary traditions of Eswatini

Location of Eswatini

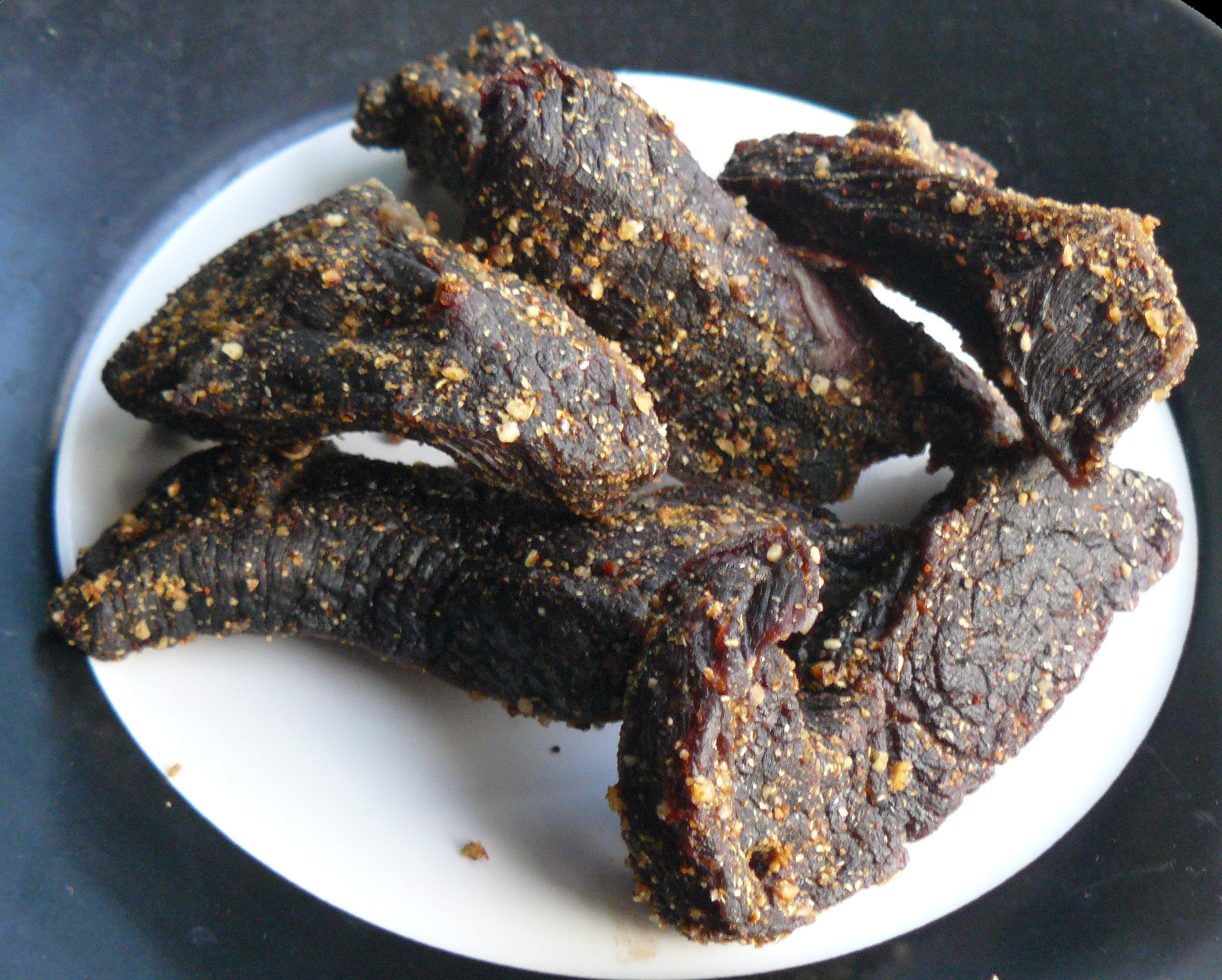
Homemade beef biltong, a type of cured meat that originated in South Africa

The cuisine of Eswatini is largely determined by the seasons and the geographical region. Staple foods in Eswatini include sorghum and maize, often served with goat meat. The farming industry mainly depends on sugarcane, tobacco, rice, maize, peanuts, and the export of goat meat and beef. Many Swazis are subsistence farmers who supplement their diet with food bought from markets.

Produce and imports from coastal nations are also part of the cuisine of Eswatini. Some local markets have food stalls with traditional Swazi meat stew, sandwiches, maize meal and seasonal roasted corn on the cob.

== Traditional foods ==
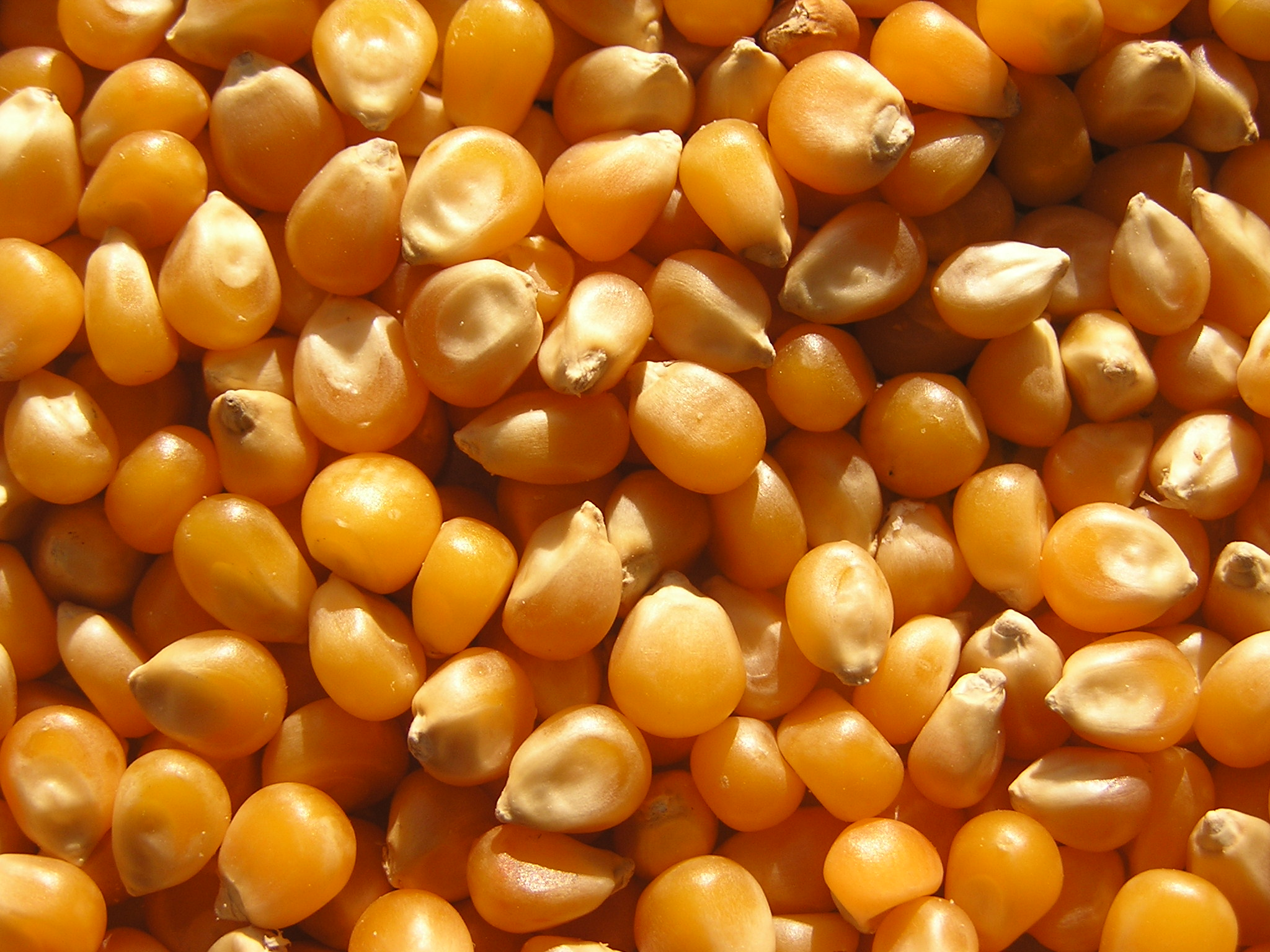
Maize

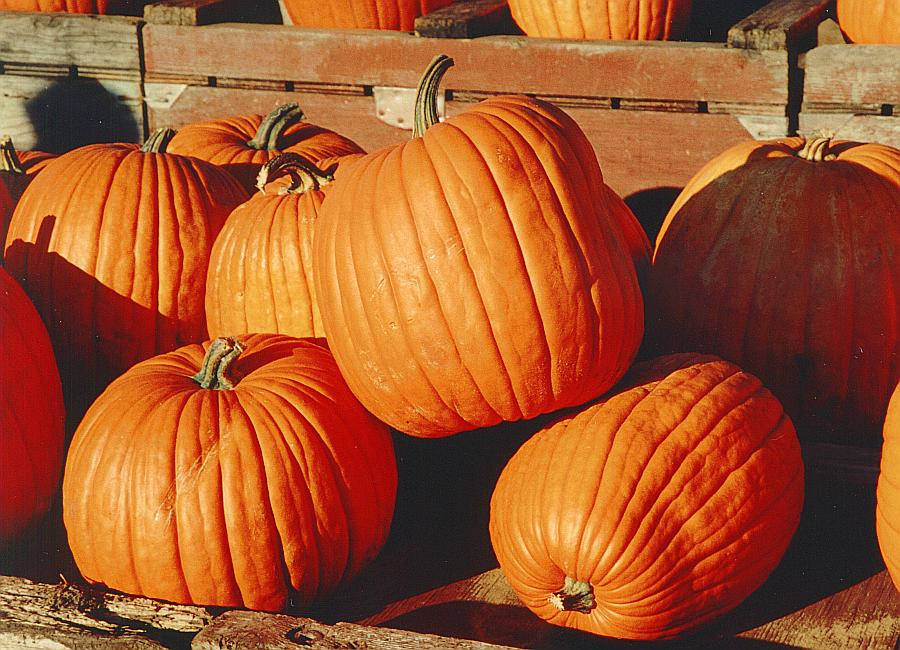
Pumpkins

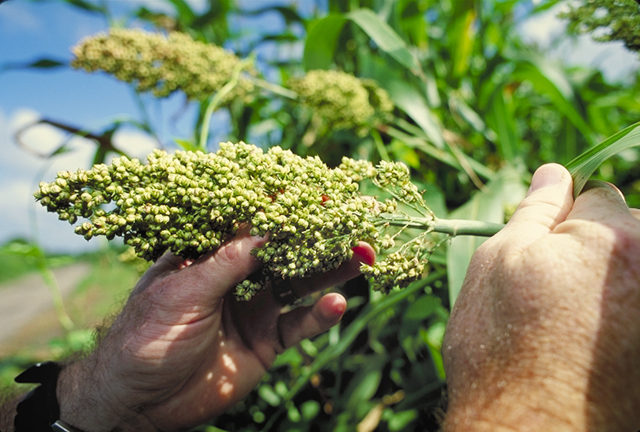
Sorghum

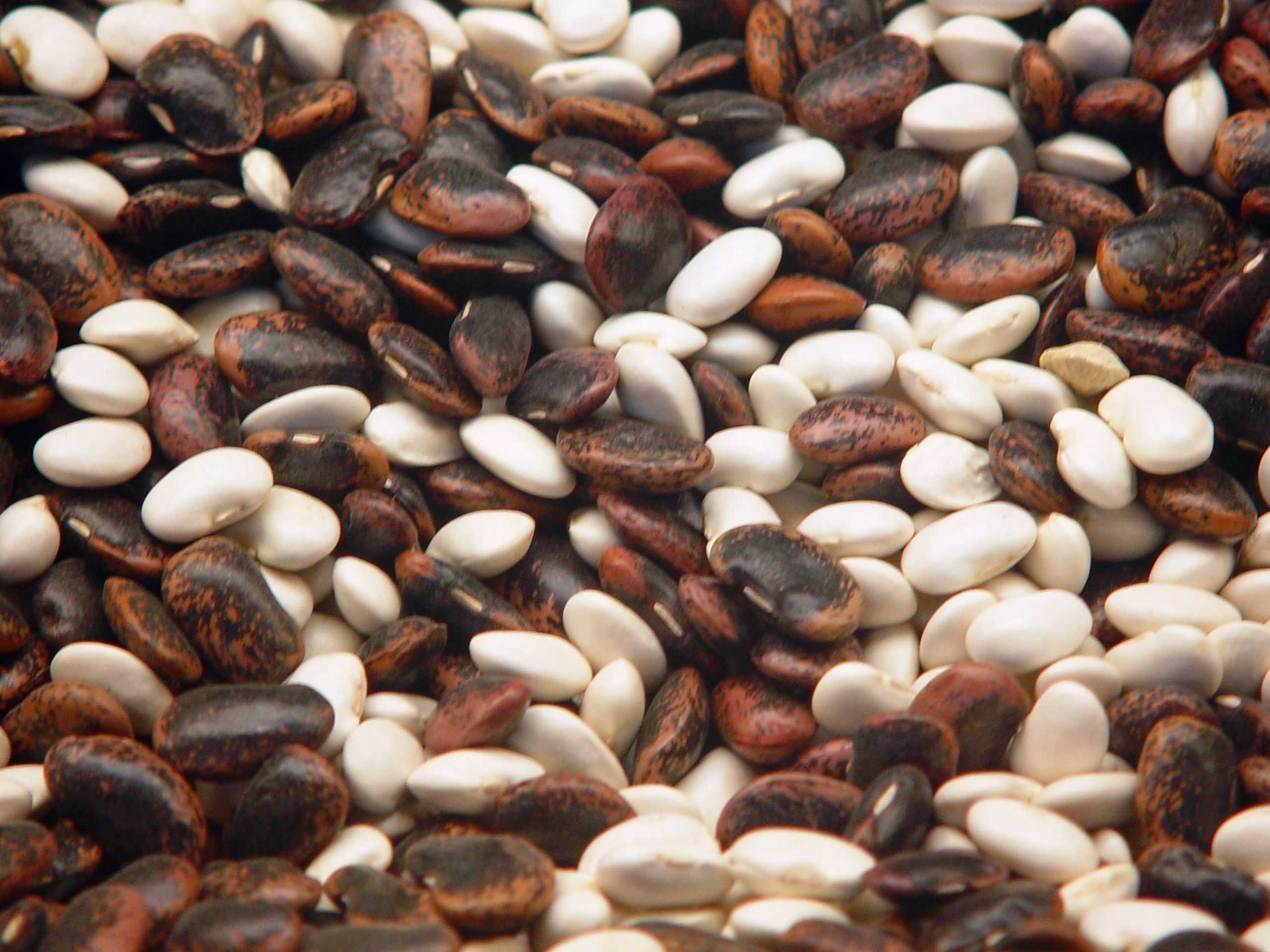
Various types of beans

Traditional foods of Eswatini include:

- Sishwala—thick porridge normally served with meat or vegetables
- Incwancwa—sour porridge made of fermented cornmeal
- Sitfubi—fresh milk cooked and mixed with cornmeal
- Siphuphe setindlubu—thick porridge made of mashed ground nuts
- Emasi etinkhobe temmbila—ground corn mixed with sour milk
- Emasi emabele—ground sorghum mixed with sour milk
- Sidvudvu—porridge made of pumpkin mixed with cornmeal
- Umncweba—dried uncooked meat (biltong)
- Siphuphe semabhontjisi—thick porridge made of mashed beans
- Tinkhobe—boiled whole maize
- Umbidvo wetintsanga—cooked pumpkin tops (leaves) mixed with ground nuts
- Emahewu—meal drink made from fermented thin porridge
- Umcombotsi—traditional brewed beer in Siswati is called tjwala

== See also ==
- African cuisine
