= Swazi Media Commentary =

Swazi Media Commentary is a blog written by former associate professor in journalism and mass communication at the University of Swaziland, Richard Rooney. The Blog discusses and informs about the political and human rights situation in Swaziland, focusing primarily on media freedom and the ethical issues of journalism practitioners in newspapers and other media.

The blog has been called "refreshingly insightful, honest and unrestrained" by the Swazi Nation Magazine and "very outspoken, comprehensive, and widely read" by Pambazuka News.
