= List of ecoregions in Eswatini =

The following is a list of ecoregions in Eswatini, as identified by the Worldwide Fund for Nature (WWF).

== Terrestrial ecoregions ==
by major habitat type

=== Tropical and subtropical moist broadleaf forests ===
- Maputaland coastal forest mosaic

=== Tropical and subtropical grasslands, savannas, and shrublands ===
- Zambezian and mopane woodlands

=== Montane grasslands and shrublands ===
- Drakensberg montane forests, grasslands, and shrublands

== Freshwater ecoregions ==
by bioregion

=== Zambezi ===
- Zambezian Lowveld

=== Southern Temperate ===
- Southern Temperate Highveld
