= Human rights in Eswatini =

Eswatini, Africa's last remaining absolute monarchy, was rated by Freedom House from 1972 to 1992 as "Partly Free"; since 1993, it has been considered "Not Free". During these years the country's Freedom House rating for "Political Rights" has slipped from 4 to 7, and "Civil Liberties" from 2 to 5. Political parties have been banned in Eswatini since 1973. A 2011 Human Rights Watch report described the country as being "in the midst of a serious crisis of governance", noting that "[y]ears of extravagant expenditure by the royal family, fiscal indiscipline, and government corruption have left the country on the brink of economic disaster". In 2012, the African Commission on Human and Peoples' Rights (ACHPR) issued a sharp criticism of Eswatini's human-rights record, calling on the Swazi government to honor its commitments under international law in regards to freedom of expression, association, and assembly. HRW notes that owing to a 40% unemployment rate and low wages that oblige 80% of Swazis to live on less than US$2 a day, the government has been under "increasing pressure from civil society activists and trade unionists to implement economic reforms and open up the space for civil and political activism" and that dozens of arrests have taken place "during protests against the government's poor governance and human rights record".

Human-rights problems in Eswatini include, according to a 2011 report by the U.S. State Department, "extrajudicial killings by security forces; mob killings; police use of torture, beatings, and excessive force on detainees; police impunity; arbitrary arrests and lengthy pretrial detention; arbitrary interference with privacy and home; restrictions on freedoms of speech and press and harassment of journalists; restrictions on freedoms of assembly, association, and movement; prohibitions on political activity and harassment of political activists; discrimination and violence against women; child abuse; trafficking in persons; societal discrimination against members of the lesbian, gay, bisexual, and transgender (LGBT) community; discrimination against mixed-race and white citizens; harassment of labor leaders; restrictions on worker rights; and child labour in Eswatini".

In August 2011, the International Monetary Fund urged Eswatini's government to implement fiscal reforms to address its deepening crisis. In that same month South Africa agreed to loan Eswatini $355 million on the condition that it institute political and economic reforms. The conditions were rejected.

== Human-rights commission ==
Amnesty International noted in 2011 that the Swazi constitution provides for the establishment of a Human Rights and Public Administration Commission. That commission was appointed in 2009, but operates "in the absence of an enabling statutory law", which keeps it "from effectively discharging its mandate and obligations".

== Human-rights organizations ==
The organizations most active in human rights in Eswatini include the Eswatini Action Group Against Abuse, Lawyers for Human Rights of Eswatini, Women and Law in Southern Africa, the Council of Eswatini Churches, and the Roman Catholic Church. These and other groups are generally able to operate without restriction, but the government is rarely responsive to their input. The government usually cooperates with the UN and other international bodies.

In 2011, according to Human Rights Watch, the harassment and surveillance of civil society organizations by police intensified, with activists being "arrested, detained, and tried under security legislation" and charged with treason and other offenses. "Civil society activists and government critics have reported increased incidents of harassment, searches, and seizures of office materials, as well as monitoring of electronic communications, telephones calls, and meetings by the authorities", noted HRW, which added that activists are often subjected to excessive force, torture, and other ill treatment, and that there is no "independent complaints investigation body...for victims of police abuses".

== Basic rights ==
The constitution prohibits discrimination based on race, sex, disability, age, ethnicity, religion, political opinion, or social status; however, the government does not consistently enforce these prohibitions. Corruption is widespread and is not vigorously combatted. The police forces are considered to be rife with corruption. Principals and teachers take bribes to admit students to schools. Nepotism is common. Authorities commit arbitrary and unlawful killings. Torture by police is not specifically prohibited by law, and a constitutional provision concerning torture is not enforceable; in practice, indeed, security officers use torture frequently, and the use of excessive force by the police is widespread. Mob violence is also a frequent occurrence, with rape suspects, especially, often being beaten by mobs, the members of which are rarely punished. Local government is principally in hands of tribal chiefs who also supervise volunteer rural “community police,” who have the authority to make arrests for minor offenses.

The constitution includes strongly worded guarantees of fundamental freedom, but it also permits the government to restrict or suspend these rights. Amnesty International maintains that these rights are especially threatened by "draconian security legislation such as the Sedition and Subversive Activities Act and the 2008 Suppression of Terrorism Act (STA)", and notes that "the provisions of the former Act are vague and can be interpreted in such a manner as to severely curtail the enjoyment of freedom of expression, among other rights, and allow for punishments of up to twenty years' imprisonment without the option of a fine". Amnesty International points out that "provisions in the STA are sweeping and imprecise while the penalties for breaches are severe", with the term "terrorist act" in particular being defined very broadly. Human Rights Watch, too, has used the word "draconian" to describe the Sedition and Subversive Activities Act.

The freedom to move within the country, travel abroad, move abroad, or move back from abroad is generally respected, although tribal chiefs have the power to evict persons from the areas under their authority. The processing of passports and ID documents for non-ethnic Swazis often takes an unusually long time.

Police officers above a certain rank can search private premises without warrants if they profess to believe that evidence might be lost otherwise, and many homes and businesses are in fact entered without court authorization. Members of political, religious, labor, and other groups are subject to police surveillance. In September 2010, police entered the premises of the Foundation for Socioeconomic Justice and harassed visiting Danish citizens, whom they took to the police station. Since 2008 people who aid or abet certain groups - PUDEMO, the Eswatini Solidarity Network (ESN), SWAYOCO, and the Eswatini People's Liberation Army (UMBANE) - have been subject to punishment up to and including life imprisonment under the 2008 Suppression of Terrorism Act.

Amnesty International has registered its objection to the 1953 Game Act, which "gives game-rangers or any person acting on their instructions the right to use firearms 'in self defence or if he has reason to believe that his life, or that of any of his colleagues, is threatened or in danger.' This would appear to permit the use of lethal force in situations where there may be no threat to life." The organization has also expressed its concern about police officers who use "excessive force against peaceful demonstrators, use lethal force without justification against criminal suspects, and use torture and other forms of ill-treatment against arrested and detained persons". It cited the Rev. David Matse, then chairman of the Human Rights and Public Administration Commission, as saying in January 2010 "that police and soldiers appeared to be using a 'shoot-to-kill policy'....In cases where Amnesty International sought corroboration, the information clearly indicated that the victims were not posing a threat to life when they were fatally shot". Many persons taken into police custody, moreover, were subject to "severe beatings and suffocation torture, occurring in both informal settings and at police stations", with the targets "usually criminal suspects and government opponents".

=== Freedom of speech ===
An individual's freedom of speech or of the press may be waived by the king at will. Freedom of speech is strictly restricted in any event, especially speech about political issues or the ruling family. Criticizing the king is subject to prosecution as sedition or treason, and news media that engage in such criticism risk being closed. Self-censorship by journalists is standard practice. Although newspapers sometimes criticize government corruption, they are almost always careful to avoid criticizing the king and his family. Journalists are regularly threatened and assaulted, and defamation laws are used against them, to restrict their activities.

The government does not restrict cultural events or online access, and does not monitor the Internet, but it does restrict political meetings, and academics routinely engage in self-censorship to avoid trouble with the authorities. The freedom of assembly is strictly controlled, with police permission required, and often denied, for political meetings or public demonstrations. The constitution provides for freedom of association. There is no legal mechanism for political parties to contest elections or appear on a ballot. HRW maintains that the government of Eswatini "has intensified restrictions on freedom of association and assembly in the past few years", with police routinely dispersing and arresting participants in peaceful demonstrations. HRW cited the case of a September 9, 2011, rally in Manzini, at which the police beat up leaders of the opposition Peoples' United Democratic Movement (PUDEMO).

=== Religious freedom ===
Eswatini's constitution and laws protect religious freedom, but "minority religious groups enjoy fewer protections under traditional laws and customs, which include traditional courts and the authority of approximately 360 chiefs", according to a U.S. State Department report on religious freedom. "When a religious group's practices conflict with tradition and culture as defined by chiefs, they may direct community pressure against the group." Religious groups must obtain the approval of chiefs before constructing houses of worship. New congregations must submit applications to the authorities through one of three umbrella bodies: the League of Churches, Eswatini Conference of Churches, or Council of Eswatini Churches. Believers practice openly and without interference, with Muslim clergy being permitted access to prisoners and Baha'i schools allowed to close on that religion's holy days. Despite a general respect for religious freedom there is still a degree of societal discrimination, especially toward non-Christian faiths, although this may have roots in ethnic differences.

== Women's rights ==
Most married women in Eswatini have "the status of legal minors", according to Amnesty International. "Women married under the civil law provisions (the 1964 Marriages Act) are subject to the 'marital power' of their husbands", and are not permitted to independently manage property or sign contracts. They can opt out of this situation through a prenuptial agreement, but few women know that this is a possibility. Women who marry under customary law are even more fully subject to their husband's "marital power", whose limits, Amnesty International says, "are unclear". Under both civil and tribal law, women are subordinate to men, and their rights differ under the two legal systems, which have conflicting sets of legislation on such matters as marriage, custody, property, and inheritance.

The law criminalizes domestic violence and rape, including rape of a spouse or intimate partner. Rape is illegal in Eswatini but widespread, and the law against it not consistently enforced. Amnesty International has stated that "rape is defined narrowly and marital rape is not criminalized in either statute or common law", adding that the Girls and Women's Protection Act of 1920 "specifically excludes marital rape from its range of offences". Rape is widely viewed by men as a minor offense and by woman as a shameful event that they prefer not to report. Some Swazi feminists felt that the view taken of women by many Swazi men was reflected in a December 2012 Times Sunday column by Qalakaliboli Dlamini, who argued therein that most women who are subjected to violence have brought it on themselves and that "when a woman is battered, she may have caused more internal damage to the male who will have caused her external harm".

Domestic violence is common, but widely viewed as acceptable. While urban women report domestic violence with some frequency and are sometimes taken seriously by the Western-style courts, tribal courts in rural areas tend to have little sympathy for victims. The law includes protections against sexual harassment.

In 2010, the Swazi High Court ruled that a portion of the Deeds Registry Act under which women could not register property in their names was unconstitutional, and the Supreme Court supported the ruling, but no new legislation was enacted, and the act remained in effect. In June 2011, the government introduced a new Deeds Registry (Amendment) Bill in parliament in a belated effort to conform with the court decisions, but the bill had not yet become law by late September 2011.

Tribal law permits men to have multiple wives, but civil law prohibits polygamy. Children born into traditional marriages are considered to be their fathers' property. Only male children may inherit. Tribal chiefs can fine women who wear pants. Although the constitution declares that women are not obliged to adhere to customs they oppose, Amnesty International has objected that this formulation "places an undue burden on the individual woman, whereas international human rights law stipulates that it is the responsibility of the state to prohibit and condemn all forms of harmful practices which negatively affect women". In any event, despite the constitutional protection, women who refuse to undergo traditional long mourning periods are often treated as outcasts and may lose their homes and inheritances. Widows in mourning may not appear in some public places and are not allowed near the royal family.

== Children's rights ==
Children of Swazi fathers who acknowledge their parenthood automatically become Swazi citizens, as do children who are born out of wedlock to Swazi women and whose fathers will not acknowledge their parenthood. A foreign woman who marries a Swazi national is entitled to Swazi citizenship, and their children will be born Swazi citizens; however, the child of a Swazi woman married to a foreign man, even if he has acquired Swazi citizenship, is regarded as a citizen of the father's country of birth. Orphans and vulnerable children (OVC) make up 70 percent of the Swazi population and their primary school fees are subsidized by the government; secondary school is not compulsory.

Child abuse is common in Eswatini, but rarely reported or punished. Punishments, when they do occur, are minimal, with perpetrators of abuse resulting in death usually being fined a maximum of 200 emalangeni ($27). Many children are infected with HIV as a result of rape. One in three girls between 13 and 24 has been sexually abused. Teachers and principals are allowed to physically punish children, and do so routinely, generally beating them with sticks. Boys and girls can marry at age 18, but with parental consent and approval from the minister of justice, girls may marry at 16. There are reports that girls can marry at 13 and that "girls and young women are not sufficiently protected under the law from forced or early marriages". Many children, especially girls who are OVCs, work in prostitution, being subject to sexual exploitation at bars, brothels, and truck stops; there is no law against child prostitution. During the years prior to 2010, and during that year as well, the number of street children in Mbabane and Manzini rose steadily. Eswatini is not a party to the 1980 Hague Convention on the Civil Aspects of International Child Abduction.

== Disabled people's rights ==
The constitution calls for the protection of disabled people. Progress in expanding accessibility and access to public services for persons with disabilities is slow and services are minimal. By tradition, people with disabilities may not be in the presence of the king.

== Minority rights ==
Discrimination on the grounds of race, color, ethnic origin, tribe, or birth is technically unconstitutional, but is practiced by government bodies and society at large against whites and mixed-race persons, who experience difficulty securing official documents, from passports to building permits.

== LGBT rights ==
LGBT persons are subject to serious social discrimination and virtually all of them hide their sexual orientation. Sodomy laws are on the books but are rarely enforced. There is no law against discrimination on LGBT grounds.

== HIV/AIDS rights ==
Stigma against HIV-positive persons is less than it has been in the past. Persons with HIV cannot join the military, but serving military can stay in their jobs if they are found to be positive; other than this, it is illegal to discriminate against persons with HIV/ AIDS. In 2010 approximately 26 percent of Swazis were infected with HIV, but treatment was highly inadequate.

== Rights of refugees and asylum seekers ==
The government has a system in place for helping refugees, protects refugees whose lives or freedom might be in danger if they were returned to another country, and cooperates with the Office of the UN High Commissioner for Refugees and other humanitarian groups to help refugees and asylum seekers.

== Rights of persons under arrest ==
Arbitrary arrest and detention are unconstitutional, but occur frequently. Both the Royal Eswatini Police Service (REPS), which is responsible for internal security, and the Umbutfo Eswatini Defense Force (USDF), which handles external security, are "generally professional", according to the U.S. State Department, but are inefficient, corrupt, and lacking in resources. There are also "community police" under the control of tribal chiefs. Indigent defendants are entitled to free counsel only if they are facing the death penalty or life imprisonment. Defendants are usually informed promptly of charges, but are not always charged within the prescribed 48-hour period after arrest. There is a bail system. Members of the political opposition are sometimes arrested and held without charges. Pretrial detention can often be long.

== Rights of persons on trial ==
The constitution and law guarantee an independent judiciary, but since judges are appointed by the king their independence is limited. There are two sets of civilian courts, those that draw on Roman-Dutch law and those that draw on tribal law and custom. The latter, in which defendants are not permitted to have lawyers, can only try minor offenses and have limited sentencing powers. It is up to the Director of Public Prosecutions to select the court system under which a case will be tried. There are also military courts in which defendants may be convicted based on hearsay. The right to a public trial is generally respected.

Amnesty International notes that "access to justice for victims of human rights abuses has been undermined" since June 2011 "by a renewed crisis in the rule of law. A senior High Court judge, Thomas Masuku, whose rulings have long contributed to the protection of human rights in Eswatini, was subjected to blatantly unfair removal proceedings....These developments also set an ominous precedent for other members of the judiciary and have a direct impact on the overall independence of the functioning of the judiciary in Swaziland." In a March 2012 statement, Amnesty International said that "concrete and immediate measures to guarantee the independence and impartiality of the judiciary" that had been promised by Eswatini were "urgently needed", given that "the protection of human rights and access to justice for victims of human rights violations continues to deteriorate through what is in effect a crisis in the rule of law". The human-rights group noted that in addition to removing Thomas Masuku from the bench, the Swazi government had dismissed Minister of Justice David Matse, "who had refused to participate" in Masuku's removal.

Amnesty International further notes that legal redress for victims of human-rights abuses, and for those who seek to use the judiciary to improve human-rights protections, had "been further undermined by new restrictions, in the form of practice directives, which are being implemented in the higher courts. One of the directives limits or makes impossible access to the courts for civil litigants in cases in which the King is directly or indirectly affected as a respondent. Another directive places control over the daily allocation of cases for hearings, including those on the urgent roll, exclusively in the hands of the Chief Justice. There are fears that this situation creates an unacceptable bias in the administration of justice." Amnesty International points out that the Law Society of Eswatini had boycotted the courts in August 2011 "in protest over these developments and the failure of the authorities to institute a hearing on its complaints regarding the running of the courts".

== Rights of prisoners ==
In 2021, Eswatini's prisons could hold 2,838 people; however, the total population was 3,362, including over 800 people awaiting trial. Prisons are dilapidated, although some new buildings are improved. In the past, children lived with their mothers at the female detention facility, detainees are held alongside convicted criminals, and underage offenders are imprisoned with adults. The Red Cross and other domestic and international human-rights groups were not permitted to monitor conditions; nor are the media. There was serious overcrowding, which aided the spread of tuberculosis, HIV/AIDS, hepatitis, and other ailments. Access to visitors was adequate.

== Employees' rights ==
Most workers, not including those in "essential services", are allowed to unionize, strike, and bargain collectively. Forced labor is unconstitutional, but women and children are nonetheless compelled to work as domestics, farm laborers, and vendors. There are minimum wages for various jobs, but they do not apply to the informal sector. There are safety laws, but few safety inspections. Child labor is also illegal for children aged under 15 years, and working hours for children are limited by law, but this does not cover children employed in herding, farming and domestic service.

== Historical situation ==
The following chart shows Eswatini's ratings since 1972 in the Freedom in the World reports, published annually by Freedom House. A rating of 1 is "free"; 7, "not free".^{1}

Historical ratings

| Year | Political Rights | Civil Liberties | Status | Regent^{2} |
| 1972 | 4 | 2 | Partly Free | Sobhuza II |
| 1973 | 6 | 4 | Partly Free | Sobhuza II |
| 1974 | 6 | 4 | Partly Free | Sobhuza II |
| 1975 | 6 | 4 | Partly Free | Sobhuza II |
| 1976 | 6 | 4 | Partly Free | Sobhuza II |
| 1977 | 6 | 4 | Partly Free | Sobhuza II |
| 1978 | 6 | 6 | Partly Free | Sobhuza II |
| 1979 | 5 | 5 | Partly Free | Sobhuza II |
| 1980 | 5 | 5 | Partly Free | Sobhuza II |
| 1981 | 5 | 5 | Partly Free | Sobhuza II |
| 1982^{3} | 5 | 5 | Partly Free | Sobhuza II |
| 1983 | 5 | 5 | Partly Free | Dzeliwe of Swaziland |
| 1984 | 5 | 6 | Partly Free | Ntombi of Swaziland |
| 1985 | 5 | 6 | Partly Free | Ntombi of Swaziland |
| 1986 | 5 | 6 | Partly Free | Ntombi of Swaziland |
| 1987 | 5 | 6 | Partly Free | Mswati III |
| 1988 | 5 | 6 | Partly Free | Mswati III |
| 1989 | 6 | 5 | Partly Free | Mswati III |
| 1990 | 6 | 5 | Partly Free | Mswati III |
| 1991 | 6 | 5 | Partly Free | Mswati III |
| 1992 | 6 | 5 | Partly Free | Mswati III |
| 1993 | 6 | 5 | Not Free | Mswati III |
| 1994 | 6 | 5 | Not Free | Mswati III |
| 1995 | 6 | 5 | Not Free | Mswati III |
| 1996 | 6 | 5 | Not Free | Mswati III |
| 1997 | 6 | 5 | Not Free | Mswati III |
| 1998 | 6 | 4 | Not Free | Mswati III |
| 1999 | 6 | 5 | Not Free | Mswati III |
| 2000 | 6 | 5 | Not Free | Mswati III |
| 2001 | 6 | 5 | Not Free | Mswati III |
| 2002 | 6 | 5 | Not Free | Mswati III |
| 2003 | 7 | 5 | Not Free | Mswati III |
| 2004 | 7 | 5 | Not Free | Mswati III |
| 2005 | 7 | 5 | Not Free | Mswati III |
| 2006 | 7 | 5 | Not Free | Mswati III |
| 2007 | 7 | 5 | Not Free | Mswati III |
| 2008 | 7 | 5 | Not Free | Mswati III |
| 2009 | 7 | 5 | Not Free | Mswati III |
| 2010 | 7 | 5 | Not Free | Mswati III |
| 2011 | 7 | 5 | Not Free | Mswati III |

Freedom House changed its rating system and in 2023 it scored Eswatini as follows;

- Political Rights = 1 out of 40
- Civil Liberties = 16 out of 60
- Total = 17 out of 100

The highest scores were for Freedom of Religion, Judiciary and Freedom of Movement (all 2 out of 4).

== International treaties ==
Eswatini's stances on international human rights treaties are as follows:

International treaties

| Treaty | Organization | Introduced | Signed | Ratified |
| Convention on the Prevention and Punishment of the Crime of Genocide | United Nations | 1948 | - | - |
| International Convention on the Elimination of All Forms of Racial Discrimination | United Nations | 1966 | - | 1969 |
| International Covenant on Economic, Social and Cultural Rights | United Nations | 1966 | - | 2004 |
| International Covenant on Civil and Political Rights | United Nations | 1966 | - | 2004 |
| First Optional Protocol to the International Covenant on Civil and Political Rights | United Nations | 1966 | - | - |
| Convention on the Non-Applicability of Statutory Limitations to War Crimes and Crimes Against Humanity | United Nations | 1968 | - | - |
| International Convention on the Suppression and Punishment of the Crime of Apartheid | United Nations | 1973 | - | - |
| Convention on the Elimination of All Forms of Discrimination against Women | United Nations | 1979 | - | 2004 |
| Convention against Torture and Other Cruel, Inhuman or Degrading Treatment or Punishment | United Nations | 1984 | - | 2004 |
| Convention on the Rights of the Child | United Nations | 1989 | 1990 | 1995 |
| Second Optional Protocol to the International Covenant on Civil and Political Rights, aiming at the abolition of the death penalty | United Nations | 1989 | - | - |
| International Convention on the Protection of the Rights of All Migrant Workers and Members of Their Families | United Nations | 1990 | - | - |
| Optional Protocol to the Convention on the Elimination of All Forms of Discrimination against Women | United Nations | 1999 | - | - |
| Optional Protocol to the Convention on the Rights of the Child on the Involvement of Children in Armed Conflict | United Nations | 2000 | - | - |
| Optional Protocol to the Convention on the Rights of the Child on the Sale of Children, Child Prostitution and Child Pornography | United Nations | 2000 | - | - |
| Convention on the Rights of Persons with Disabilities | United Nations | 2006 | 2007 | - |
| Optional Protocol to the Convention on the Rights of Persons with Disabilities | United Nations | 2006 | 2007 | - |
| International Convention for the Protection of All Persons from Enforced Disappearance | United Nations | 2006 | 2007 | - |
| Optional Protocol to the International Covenant on Economic, Social and Cultural Rights | United Nations | 2008 | - | - |
| Optional Protocol to the Convention on the Rights of the Child on a Communications Procedure | United Nations | 2011 | - | - |

== See also ==
- Human trafficking in Eswatini
- Internet censorship and surveillance in Eswatini

== Notes ==
1.Note that the "Year" signifies the "Year covered". Therefore the information for the year marked 2008 is from the report published in 2009, and so on.
2.As of January 1.
3.The 1982 report covers the year 1981 and the first half of 1982, and the following 1984 report covers the second half of 1982 and the whole of 1983. In the interest of simplicity, these two aberrant "year and a half" reports have been split into three year-long reports through extrapolation.

== See also ==
- Human rights
