= Islam in Eswatini =

Eswatini is a Christian majority country, with adherents of Islam being a minority. Due to the secular nature of Eswatini's constitution, Muslims are free to proselytize and build places of worship in the country.

The nation is home to over a million people, of which about 2% identify as Muslim, most of whom belong to the Sunni branch of Islam. Islam in Eswatini probably dates back to the colonial period when some Muslims settled in the country from other countries under the dominion of the British Empire. In the post-colonial period, Islam became an officially recognized religion.

== History ==
While Muslims settled in Eswatini during the colonial period, an active community emerged around the early 1960s when Malawian Muslims arrived in Eswatini to work in asbestos mines. A few locals converted and Malawi-Swazi communities formed in some small towns. Islam became a recognized religion in 1972 by the approval of Sobhuza II. Muslims since then have partaken in the national Good Friday festivities to pray for the well-being of the monarch and many Islamic institutions have been established in urban areas.

== Population ==
According to the CIA World Factbook, about 2% of Eswatini's population are Muslim. The Muslim community in Eswatini comprises local Muslim (most of whom identify as Sunni Muslims) and refugees and immigrants from Asia and neighbouring African states. The Ahmadiyya Muslim Community claims 250 members in the country.

Figures from 2017 Eswatini official census suggested that there are an estimated 3.626 Muslim in the country, representing 0.3% from Eswatini's population.

== Law and politics ==
Muslim marriages in Eswatini are not included in the Marriage Act of 1964 which governs civil marriages. However, according to local imam Luqman Asooka, Muslim marriages are considered as custom marriages that are allowed in the constitution which guarantees "freedom of worship".

== Mosques ==
- Ezulwini Mosque

== See also ==
- Religion in Eswatini
