= Law enforcement in Eswatini =

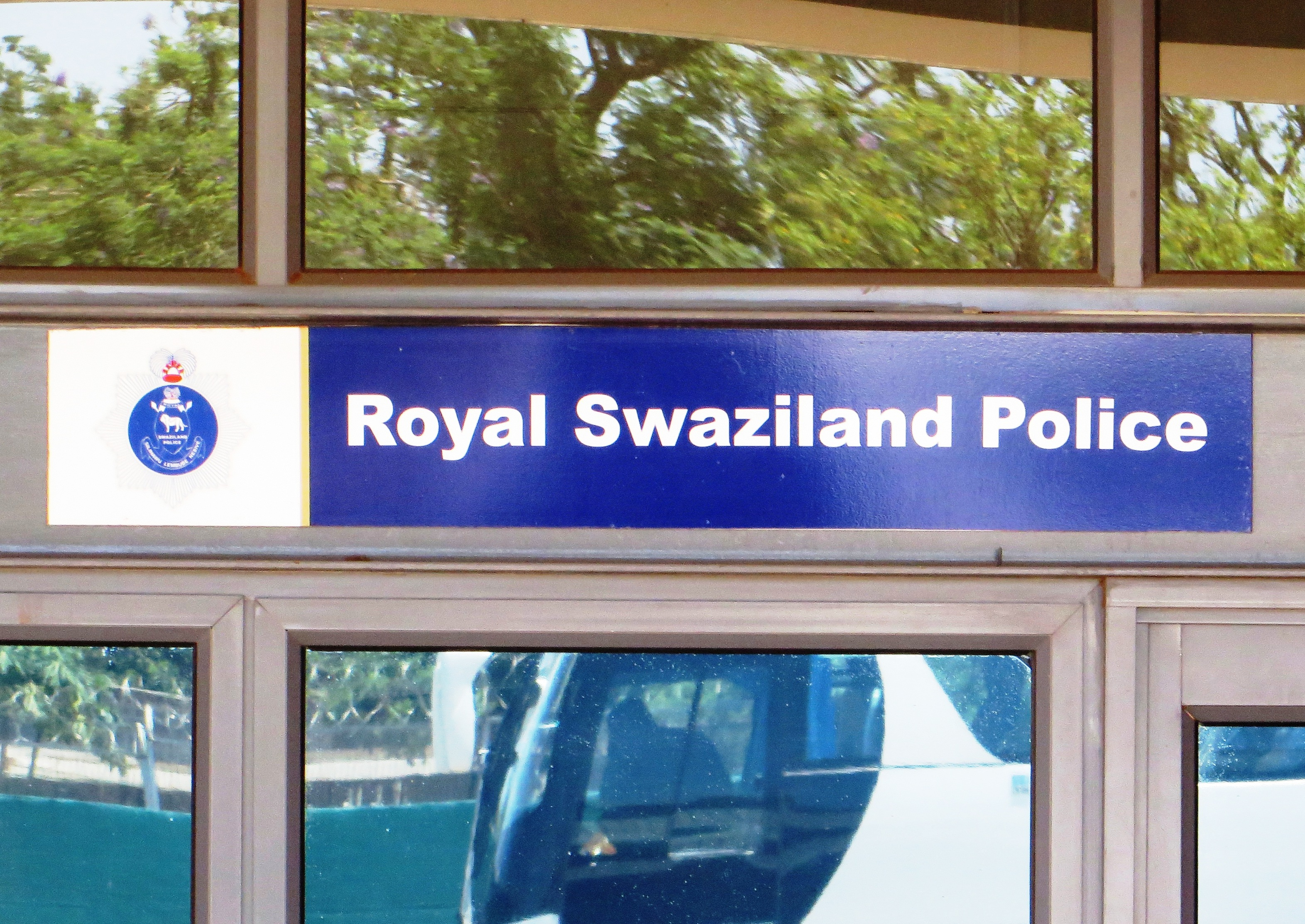
Old Eswatini police sign

Law enforcement in Eswatini is primarily the responsibility of the Royal Eswatini Police Service (REPS; Swazi: Silihawu Lembube NeSive), which oversees internal security as well as border and customs control, and His Majesty's Correctional Services (HMCS), which is tasked with maintaining and guarding prisons. It is estimated that about 35% of Government of Eswatini employees work in the security services. The country has been part of INTERPOL since October 1975 and the organization has an office in the capital of Eswatini, Mbabane.

== History ==
Founded in 1907 when the territory was under British rule, the Royal Swaziland Police Force initially consisted of 22 European officers along with 125 African Zulus, under Captain C.H. Gibson. A police training school was established in Mbabane in 1927 and a modern training college was built in 1965 at Matsapha. During the independence celebrations in 1968 King Sobhuza II renamed it into the Royal Swaziland Police Service, with the legal document that established the organization being the Police Act No. 29/1957.

== Organization ==
Both the RSPS is directly commanded by the King of Eswatini, who serves as the commander-in-chief of both the military of Eswatini and law enforcement agencies. The RSPS is formally part of the office of the Prime Minister of Eswatini, but the head of the service, the Police Commissioner, answers directly to the King who is the police commander-in-chief.

The executive command of the RSPS, under the Police Commissioner and two vice commissioners, is based in Mbabane, while there are four regional police departments. Subordinated to the four regional headquarters are 23 police stations, 22 police posts, and 12 border posts, as well as one airport security monitoring post. There is also a support unit and a police college subordinated to the executive command. The HCMS consists of fourteen offices, including the training college and the head office.

Police regional organization:

Region	Station	Post	Border Post
Hhohho	Mbabane; Pigg's Peak; Lobamba	Horo; Bulembu; Mbabane City Post; Mbabane post The Gables; Ezulwini	Ngwenya; Bulembu; Matsamo
Manzini	Manzini; Matsapha; Mliba; Mafutseni; Malkerns; Mankayane; Sidvokodvo; Bhunya	Manzini Bus Rank; Satellite Bus Rank; Mhlambanyatsi; Mahlangatsha; Lushikishini; Fairview North; Luve; Riverstone police post	Lundzi; Sandlane; Matsapha Airport
Lubombo	Siteki; Tshaneni; Lomahasha; Big Bend; Siphofaneni; Simunye; Lubulini	Mpaka; Ngomane; Shewula; St. Philips; Sithobela; Tikhuba; Mlawula; Matata	Mhlumeni; Mananga; Lomahasha />King Mswati Internal Airport (KM3)
Shiselweni	Nhlangano; Hlathikhulu; Lavumisa; Hluthi; Gege; Ka-Phunga	Mahlalini; Dumako; Debedebe; Sigwe; Matimatima; Jericho	Lavumisa; Mahamba; Gege; Sicunusa; Nsalitje

== Function and accountability ==
According to a report from the U.S. Department of State in early 2017, law enforcement personnel are generally professional but are susceptible to corruption and political pressure. The police force has a problem with corruption and although an internal investigation was conducted into this, the results were not made public.

The objectives of the RSPS are as follows:

1. Maintain peace and public order
2. Prevent and detect crime
3. Control traffic and reduce accidents
4. Pursue and apprehend offenders and bring them to justice
5. Execute court summons and subpoenas
6. Enforce state law
7. Collate information on internal state security
8. Provide security to royalty and VIPs
9. To respect the rule of law and execute Royal orders
