= Geography of Eswatini =

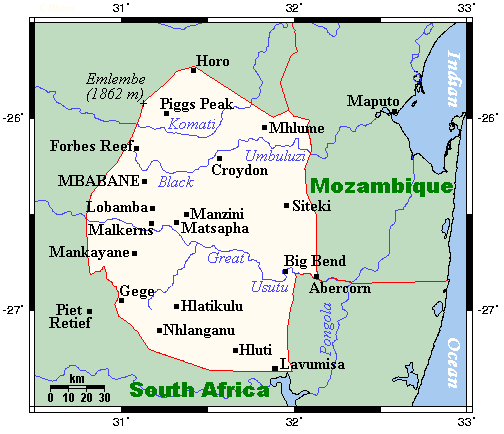
Map of Eswatini

Location of Eswatini

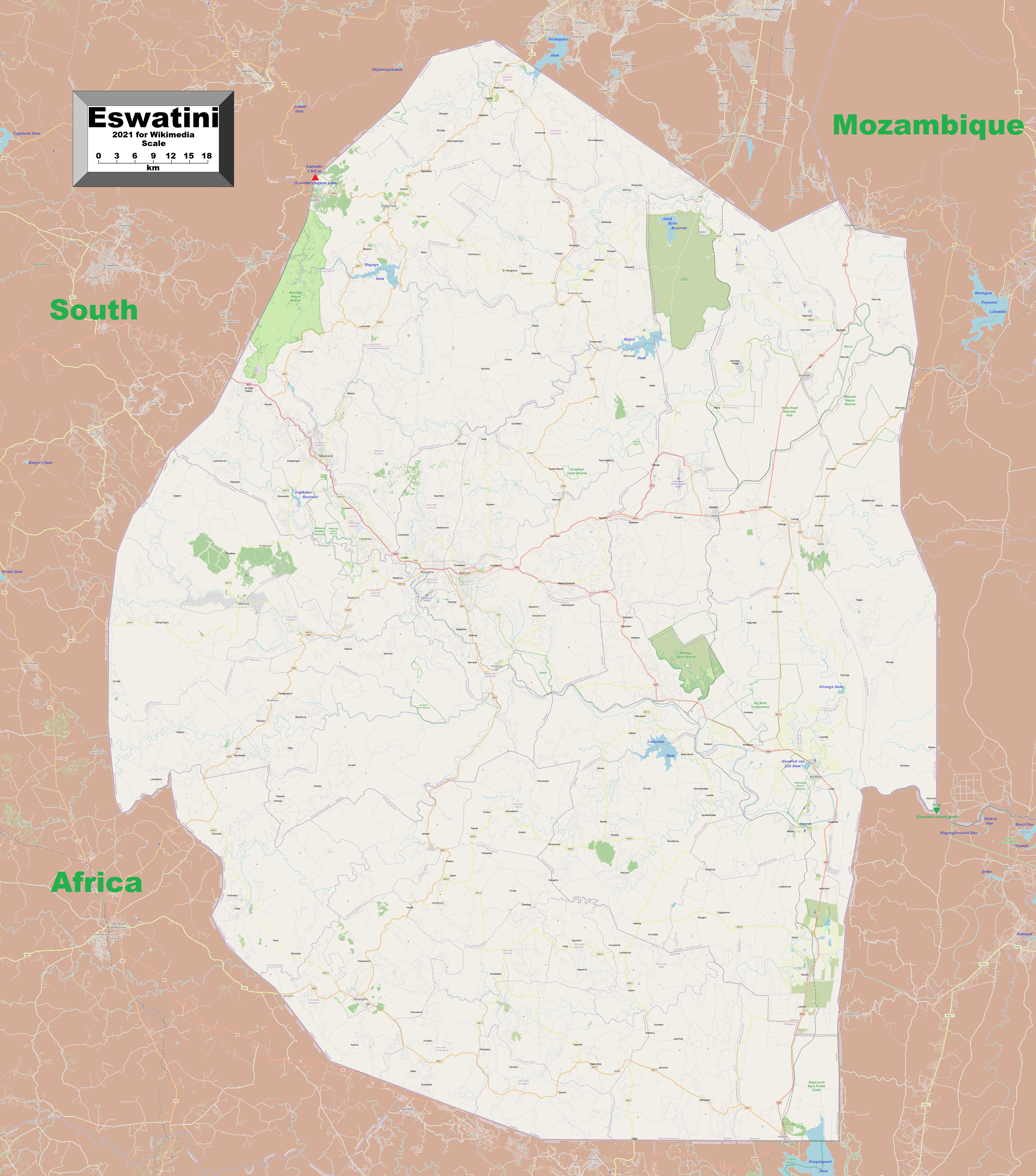
Enlargeable, detailed map of Eswatini

Eswatini (formerly Swaziland), is a country in Southern Africa lying between Mozambique and South Africa. The country is located at the geographic coordinates 26°30′S 31°30′E. Eswatini has an area of 17,363 square kilometres, of which 160 are water. The major regions of the country are Lowveld, Midveld and Highveld.

== Climate ==
The current Köppen climate classification map for Eswatini

The climate varies from tropical to near temperate. The seasons are the reverse of those in the Northern Hemisphere with December being mid-summer and June mid-winter. Generally speaking, rain falls mostly during the summer months, often in the form of thunderstorms. Winter is the dry season. Annual rainfall is highest on the Highveld in the west, between 1,000 and 2,000 mm (39.4 and 78.7 in) depending on the year. The further east, the less rain, with the Lowveld recording 500 to 900 mm (19.7 to 35.4 in) per annum. Variations in temperature are also related to the altitude of the different regions. The Highveld temperature is temperate and seldom uncomfortably hot while the Lowveld may record temperatures around 40 °C (104 °F) in summer.

Climate data for Mbabane
Month	Jan	Feb	Mar	Apr	May	Jun	Jul	Aug	Sep	Oct	Nov	Dec	Year
Mean daily maximum °C (°F)	24.9 (76.8)	24.5 (76.1)	24.1 (75.4)	22.6 (72.7)	21.4 (70.5)	19.3 (66.7)	19.8 (67.6)	21.3 (70.3)	23.2 (73.8)	22.8 (73.0)	22.5 (72.5)	23.7 (74.7)	22.5 (72.5)
Mean daily minimum °C (°F)	14.9 (58.8)	14.5 (58.1)	13.4 (56.1)	11.0 (51.8)	7.9 (46.2)	4.7 (40.5)	4.6 (40.3)	6.6 (43.9)	9.5 (49.1)	11.3 (52.3)	12.9 (55.2)	14.2 (57.6)	10.5 (50.9)
Average rainfall mm (inches)	253.2 (9.97)	224.6 (8.84)	151.6 (5.97)	87.9 (3.46)	33.8 (1.33)	19.4 (0.76)	20.1 (0.79)	35.1 (1.38)	69.4 (2.73)	141.9 (5.59)	197.8 (7.79)	206.9 (8.15)	1,441.7 (56.76)
Average rainy days	16.9	14.3	13.8	9.8	5.1	2.8	3.1	6.5	9.2	14.9	17.0	16.5	129.9
Source: World Meteorological Organization

Climate data for Big Bend
Month	Jan	Feb	Mar	Apr	May	Jun	Jul	Aug	Sep	Oct	Nov	Dec	Year
Mean daily maximum °C (°F)	32.2 (90.0)	31.7 (89.1)	30.6 (87.1)	29.1 (84.4)	27.0 (80.6)	25.2 (77.4)	25.2 (77.4)	26.5 (79.7)	28.4 (83.1)	29.8 (85.6)	30.2 (86.4)	31.6 (88.9)	29.0 (84.1)
Daily mean °C (°F)	26.2 (79.2)	26.0 (78.8)	25.0 (77.0)	22.8 (73.0)	19.9 (67.8)	17.3 (63.1)	17.1 (62.8)	19.0 (66.2)	21.4 (70.5)	23.4 (74.1)	24.3 (75.7)	25.6 (78.1)	22.3 (72.2)
Mean daily minimum °C (°F)	20.3 (68.5)	20.4 (68.7)	19.5 (67.1)	16.6 (61.9)	12.8 (55.0)	9.4 (48.9)	9.1 (48.4)	11.5 (52.7)	14.5 (58.1)	17.1 (62.8)	18.5 (65.3)	19.6 (67.3)	15.8 (60.4)
Average precipitation mm (inches)	98 (3.9)	75 (3.0)	63 (2.5)	32 (1.3)	20 (0.8)	9 (0.4)	9 (0.4)	12 (0.5)	31 (1.2)	51 (2.0)	79 (3.1)	82 (3.2)	561 (22.3)
Source: Climate-Data.org

Climate data for Manzini
Month	Jan	Feb	Mar	Apr	May	Jun	Jul	Aug	Sep	Oct	Nov	Dec	Year
Mean daily maximum °C (°F)	28.2 (82.8)	28.1 (82.6)	27.3 (81.1)	26.0 (78.8)	24.0 (75.2)	22.2 (72.0)	22.0 (71.6)	23.6 (74.5)	25.3 (77.5)	26.4 (79.5)	26.8 (80.2)	27.9 (82.2)	25.6 (78.2)
Daily mean °C (°F)	23.0 (73.4)	23.0 (73.4)	22.1 (71.8)	20.1 (68.2)	17.2 (63.0)	15.0 (59.0)	14.6 (58.3)	16.6 (61.9)	18.7 (65.7)	20.5 (68.9)	21.5 (70.7)	22.6 (72.7)	19.6 (67.3)
Mean daily minimum °C (°F)	17.9 (64.2)	17.9 (64.2)	16.9 (62.4)	14.3 (57.7)	10.5 (50.9)	7.8 (46.0)	7.3 (45.1)	9.6 (49.3)	12.2 (54.0)	14.7 (58.5)	16.2 (61.2)	17.3 (63.1)	13.6 (56.4)
Average precipitation mm (inches)	145 (5.7)	133 (5.2)	100 (3.9)	54 (2.1)	26 (1.0)	15 (0.6)	15 (0.6)	19 (0.7)	45 (1.8)	84 (3.3)	119 (4.7)	126 (5.0)	881 (34.6)
Source: Climate-Data.org

== Physical geography ==
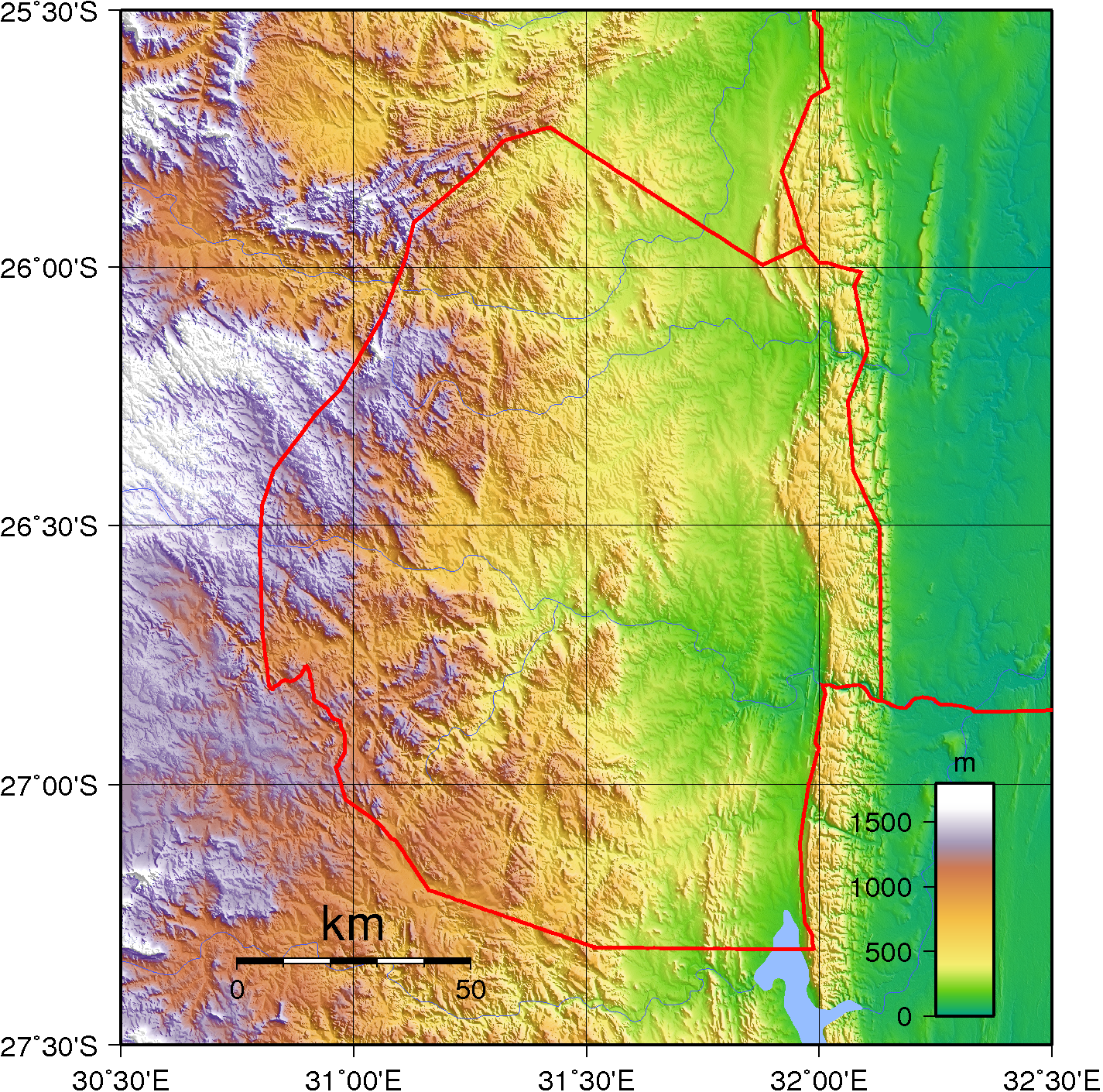
Topographic map of Eswatini

The terrain largely consists of mountains and hills, with some moderately sloping plains. The lowest point is the Great Usutu River at 21 metres (69 ft), and the highest is Emlembe at 1,862 metres (6,109 ft).

As a landlocked country, Eswatini has neither coastline nor maritime claims. In terms of land boundaries, Eswatini borders Mozambique for 105 kilometres (65 mi) and South Africa for 430 kilometres (270 mi), giving a total land boundary length of 535 kilometres (332 mi).

=== Natural resources ===
Eswatini's natural resources are asbestos, coal, clay, cassiterite, hydropower, forests, small gold and diamond deposits, quarry stone and talc.

670 square kilometres (260 sq mi) of the country's land is irrigated. The following table describes land use in Eswatini:

Land use
Use	Percentage by area
Arable land	9.77
Permanent crops	0.7
Other	89.53

== Environment ==
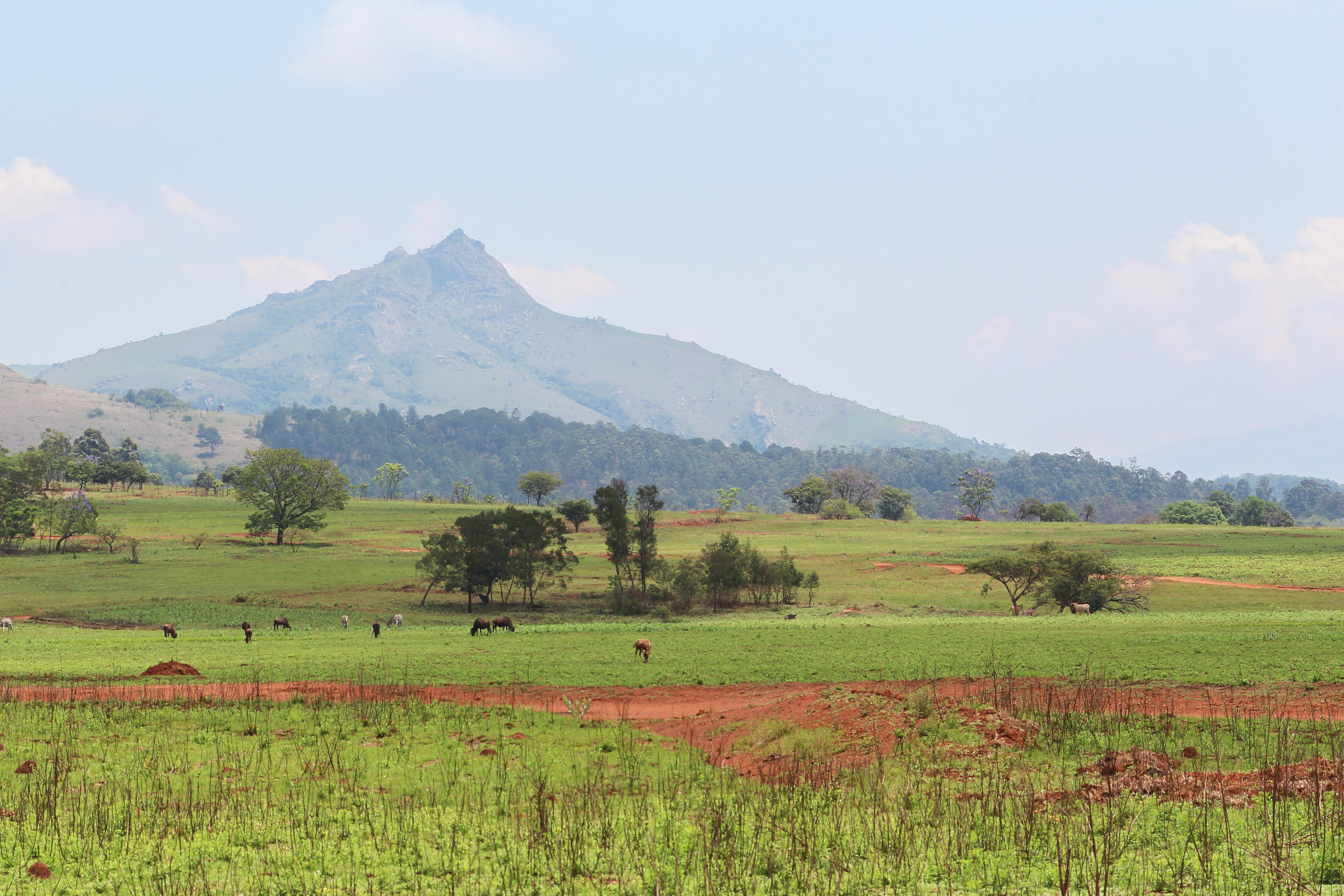
Mlilwane Wildlife Sanctuary

Eswatini is prone to floods and drought. Soil erosion as a result of overgrazing is a growing problem.

Eswatini is part of the following international agreements: Biodiversity, Endangered Species, Nuclear Test Ban and Ozone Layer Protection. The country has signed, but not ratified the agreement on desertification and the law of the sea.

=== Tree cover extent and loss ===
Global Forest Watch publishes annual estimates of tree cover loss and 2000 tree cover extent derived from time-series analysis of Landsat satellite imagery in the Global Forest Change dataset. In this framework, tree cover refers to vegetation taller than 5 m (including natural forests and tree plantations), and tree cover loss is defined as the complete removal of tree cover canopy for a given year, regardless of cause.

For Eswatini, country statistics report cumulative tree cover loss of 110,898 ha (1,108.98 km^{2}) from 2001 to 2024 (about 23.6% of its 2000 tree cover area). For tree cover density greater than 30%, country statistics report a 2000 tree cover extent of 469,223 ha (4,692.23 km^{2}). The charts and table below display this data. In simple terms, the annual loss number is the area where tree cover disappeared in that year, and the extent number shows what remains of the 2000 tree cover baseline after subtracting cumulative loss. Forest regrowth is not included in the dataset.

Annual tree cover loss in Eswatini, 2001–2024. View chart definition.
Tree cover extent in 2000 minus cumulative tree cover loss in Eswatini, 2001–2024 (loss-only residual; does not account for gain). View chart definition.

Annual tree cover extent and loss
Year	Tree cover extent (km2) (Note: This residual measure does not include forest regrowth.)	Annual tree cover loss (km2)
2001	4,624.88	67.35
2002	4,586.88	38.00
2003	4,529.28	57.60
2004	4,475.65	53.63
2005	4,430.30	45.35
2006	4,335.98	94.32
2007	4,271.29	64.69
2008	4,225.47	45.82
2009	4,118.93	106.54
2010	4,052.34	66.59
2011	4,026.12	26.22
2012	3,990.86	35.26
2013	3,959.60	31.26
2014	3,910.00	49.60
2015	3,877.83	32.17
2016	3,829.81	48.02
2017	3,766.05	63.76
2018	3,746.85	19.20
2019	3,705.69	41.16
2020	3,678.85	26.84
2021	3,647.25	31.60
2022	3,627.87	19.38
2023	3,607.53	20.34
2024	3,583.25	24.28

=== REDD+ reference level and monitoring ===
Under the UNFCCC REDD+ framework, Eswatini has submitted a national forest reference level (FRL). On the UNFCCC REDD+ Web Platform, the country's 2024 submission is listed as "under technical assessment", while the other Warsaw Framework elements - a national strategy, safeguards, and a national forest monitoring system - are listed as "not reported".

The 2024 submission proposes Eswatini's first FRL at national scale and covers all five REDD+ activities: reducing emissions from deforestation, reducing emissions from forest degradation, conservation of forest carbon stocks, sustainable management of forests, and enhancement of forest carbon stocks. It uses a historical reference period of 2000-2020 and a results period of 2021-2025, and proposes a "zero FRL" of 0 t CO2 eq per year. According to the submission, this approach was chosen because Eswatini considers itself a net carbon remover and would therefore seek results-based payments only for net removals at the national level.

The submission applies a forest definition with a minimum mapping unit of 1/2 hectare (6,000 yd^{2}), minimum tree cover of 10 percent, and trees with the potential to reach 5 metres (16 ft) in height at maturity. It states that activity data were derived from a national land-use assessment grid spaced at 2.5 km (1.6 mi) intervals, with 7,702 plots interpreted by national experts. The proposed FRL includes above-ground biomass, below-ground biomass, deadwood, litter and soil organic carbon, while excluding harvested wood products; it reports CO2 and also includes non-CO2 emissions from fire, specifically methane (CH_{4}) and nitrous oxide (N_{2}O).

== Extreme points ==
This is a list of the extreme points of Eswatini, the points that are farther north, south, east or west than any other location.

- Northernmost point - unnamed location of the border with South Africa immediately north of the village of Horo, Hhohho Region
- Easternmost point - the tripoint with South Africa and Mozambique, Lubombo Region
- Southernmost point - unnamed location on the border with South Africa, Shiselweni Region
- Westernmost point - a longitudinal segment of the border with South Africa, Manzini Region (not a single point)
