= Eswatini Stock Exchange =

Stock exchange located in Mbabane, Eswatini

Coordinates: 26°19′50″S 31°08′21″E

- Industry: Finance
- Founded: July 1990
- Headquarters: Mbabane
- Key people: Sibusiso Dlamini, Founder
- Products: Stock Trading Services
- Website: ese.co.sz

The Eswatini Stock Exchange (ESE) is a small stock exchange headquartered in Mbabane, Eswatini. It was established in 1990 as a non-bank credit institution by Barnabas Sibusiso Dlamini, a former World Bank executive who later became Eswatini's Prime Minister.

All listings are included in the sole index, the ESE All Share Index, which was unweighted until 2001 and is now weighted by market cap. There are a handful of listed public companies, as well as some listed government stock options, listed debentures, government guaranteed stock and non trading mutual funds.

== History ==
The ESE was founded in July 1990, as the Swaziland Stock Market. It was an over-the-counter market with a single broker until 1999. In July 1999, it was converted to a full stock exchange and renamed the Swaziland Stock Exchange (SSX).

The SSX was converted to a public company in 2003. It was part of the government's Financial Services Regulatory Authority from 2013 to 2017, after which it became an independent institution. It adopted its current name, the Eswatini Stock Exchange, in 2019, after the country's English name was changed to Eswatini.

In 2019, the government of Eswatini announced that the stock exchange now allows for automated trading. In December 2023, the First National Bank of Eswatini began trading on the exchange.

== Operations ==
Nedbank (Swaziland), then part of Standard Chartered, was the first stock listed on the market, in July 1990. Government bonds were traded starting in December 1990. Adoption was otherwise slow; only three stocks were listed on the exchange by September 1992. By 2017, six companies and five government or corporate bonds were traded on the exchange, with a total market cap of approximately 250 million USD. As of September 2026, ten equity and five debt services were listed on the ESE.

Exchange Control approval is required for foreigners wishing to invest on the stock market. Stockbrokers on the Exchange are licensed by the Financial Services Regulatory Authority (FSRA) and there is no regulation regarding the foreign ownership of brokerage firms.

The ESE is a member of the African Securities Exchanges Association.

== See also ==
- List of African stock exchanges
- Economy of Eswatini
