= Telecommunications in Eswatini =

Telecommunications in Eswatini includes radio, television, fixed and mobile telephones, and the Internet.

== Ownership and regulation ==
Eswatini is one of the last countries in the world to abolish an almost complete monopoly in all sectors of its telecommunications market. Until 2011, the state-owned operator, Eswatini Posts and Telecommunications (EPTC), also acted as the industry regulator and had a stake in the country's sole mobile network, in partnership with South Africa's MTN Group. In a bid to enter the mobile market independently, SPTC transferred its stake in MTN and the regulatory authority to the government. In return, Swazi MTN received a 3G licence and the right to provide its own backbone network and international gateway. However, proposals have been made to reinstate SPTC's monopoly on the national backbone and the international gateway, and MTN is challenging SPTC in the courts over its move into the mobile market.

== Radio and television ==
- Radio stations:
  - State-owned radio network with 3 channels, 1 private radio station (2007);
  - AM 3, FM 2 plus 4 repeaters, shortwave 3 (2001);
  - AM 3, FM 4, shortwave 1 (1998).
- Radios: 155,000 (1997).
- Television stations:
  - State-owned TV station, satellite dishes are able to access South African providers (2007);
  - 5 plus 7 repeaters (2001);
  - 2 plus 7 repeaters (1997).
- Television sets: 21,000 (1997).

== Telephones ==
- Calling code: +268
- International call prefix: 00
- Main lines in use:
  - 48,600 lines, 164th in the world (2012);
  - 44,000 lines (2009);
  - 38,500 lines (2001);
  - 20,000 lines (1996).
- Mobile cellular:
  - 805,000 lines, 160th in the world (2012);
  - 732,700 lines (2009);
  - 250,000 lines (2007);
  - none (1996).
- Telephone system: a somewhat modern, but not an advanced system; single source for mobile-cellular service with a geographic coverage of about 90% and a rising subscriber-ship base; combined fixed-line and mobile cellular teledensity roughly 60 telephones per 100 persons in 2011; telephone system consists of carrier-equipped, open-wire lines and low-capacity, microwave radio relay.
- Satellite earth stations: 1 Intelsat (Atlantic Ocean) (2009).

Mobile market penetration in Eswatini has been well above the African average, but subscriber growth has slowed in recent years. The average revenue per user (APRU) is one of the highest in Africa. The government is considering issuing another mobile licence to an international operator.

== Internet ==
- Top-level domain: .sz
- Internet users:
  - 288,225 users, 141st in the world; 20.8% of the population, 143rd in the world (2012);
  - 90,100 users, 162nd in the world (2009).
- Fixed broadband: 3,717 subscriptions, 165th in the world; 0.3% of the population, 155th in the world (2012).
- Wireless broadband: 166,485 subscribers, 113th in the world; 12.0% of the population, 86th in the world (2012).
- Internet hosts: 2,744 hosts, 158th in the world (2012).
- IPv4: 34,560 addresses allocated, less than 0.05% of the world total, 24.9 addresses per 1000 people (2012).
- Internet service providers: 5 ISPs (2002), 2 ISPs (1999).

The Internet sector has been open to competition with four licensed Internet service providers (ISPs), but prices have remained high and market penetration relatively low. ADSL was introduced in 2008 and 3G mobile broadband services in 2011, but development of the sector has been hampered by the limited fixed-line infrastructure and a lack of competition in the access and backbone network.

Eswatini has a relatively well-developed fibre optic backbone network. However, being landlocked, the country depends on neighbouring countries for international fibre bandwidth which has led to high prices. A reduction of the high cost of international bandwidth is expected from the several new submarine fibre optic cables that have reached the region recently.

=== Internet censorship and surveillance ===
There are no official government restrictions on access to the Internet. For the most part, individuals and groups engage in the peaceful expression of views via the Internet, including by e-mail. Nevertheless, there are reports that the government monitors e-mail, Facebook, and Internet chat rooms and that police tap certain individuals' telephones.

The constitution provides for freedom of speech and press, but the king may deny these rights at his discretion, and the government does at times restrict these rights, especially regarding political issues or the royal family. The law empowers the government to ban publications if they are deemed "prejudicial or potentially prejudicial to the interests of defense, public safety, public order, public morality, or public health." Most journalists practice self-censorship. The constitution and law prohibit arbitrary interference with privacy, family, home, or correspondence except "in the interest of defense, public safety, public order, public morality, public health, town and country planning, use of mineral resources, and development of land in the public benefit"; however, the government does not always respect these prohibitions and broadly construes exceptions to the law.

In March 2012, the Times of Swaziland reported that a number of senators asked that the government take legal action against individuals who criticized King Mswati III on social networking sites. Minister of Justice Mgwagwa Gamedze backed the calls and said he would look for "international laws" that could be used to charge offenders.

== See also ==
- MTN Group
