= Religion in Eswatini =

Religion in Eswatini (2017 census)
1. Christianity (89.3%)
2. No religion (7.40%)
3. Traditional faiths (0.50%)
4. Others (2.80%)

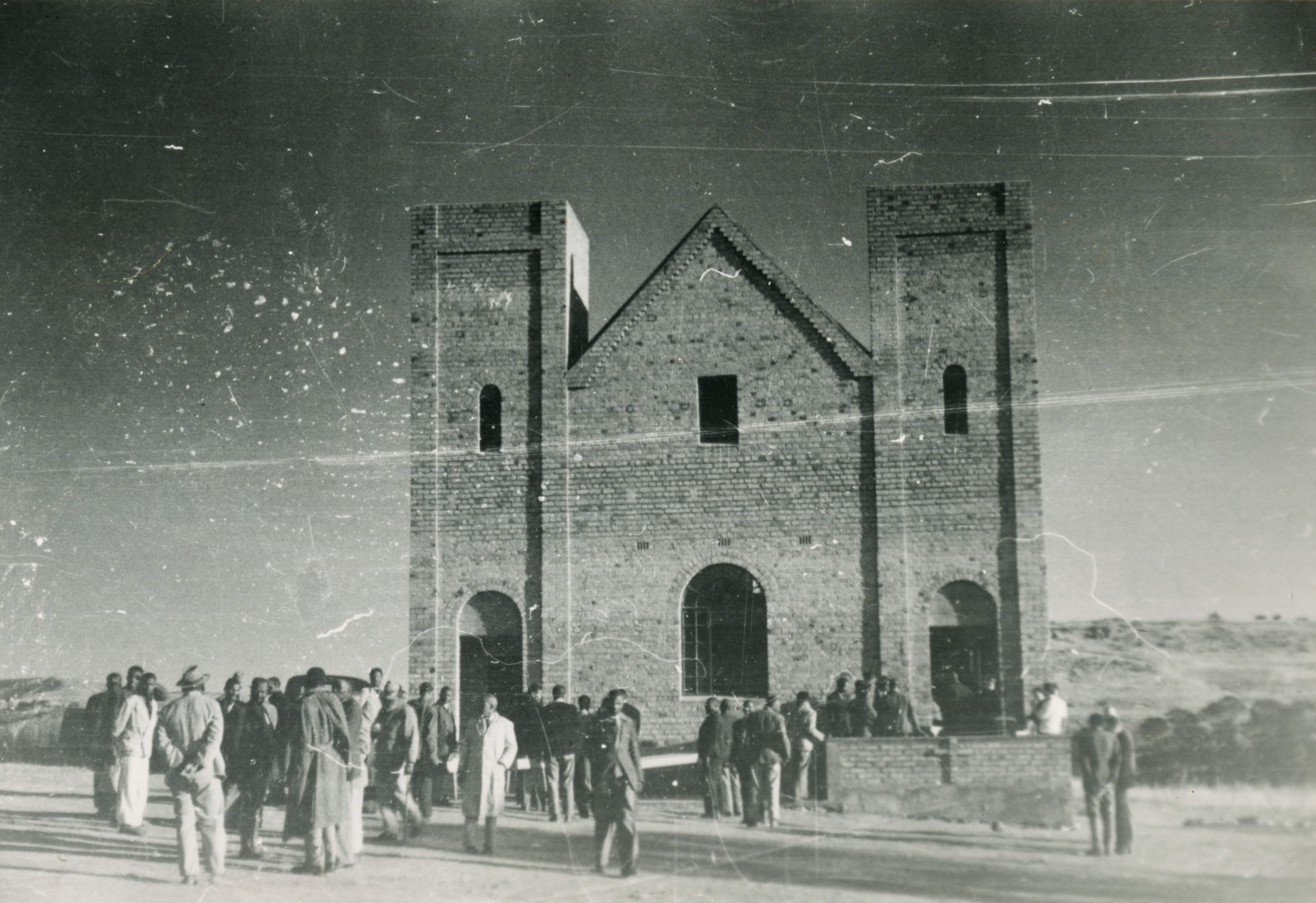
A church in Bethel, Eswatini in 1930

Christianity is the predominant religion in Eswatini, with Protestantism being its largest denomination. The royal family of Eswatini is officially Christian.

The Constitution of the Kingdom provides for freedom of religion and the government generally respects religious liberty.

== Overview ==
The statistics on religious adherence vary by source.

According to the United States Department of State religious freedom report of 2022, local religious leaders estimate that 90% of Eswatini's population is Christian (including 20% Catholic), 2% are Muslim, while under 10% belong to other religious groups.

According to the CIA World Factbook, in 2020 the distribution was 40% Zionist, 20% Catholic, other Christians (including Anglican, Methodist, Mormon, and Jehovah's Witnesses) 30%, 2% Muslim and 8% other religions (including Baháʼí, Buddhist, Hindu, indigenous, and Jewish).

According to Pew Research Center, in 2012 over 88% of the total 1.2 million population of Eswatini self-reported as Christian, while over 0.2% express no affiliation.

Anglican, Protestant and indigenous African churches including African Zionist, and Catholics constitute the majority of the Christians in the country. On 18 July 2012, Ellinah Wamukoya was elected Anglican Bishop of Eswatini; on 17 November 2012, she became the first woman consecrated as a bishop in Africa.

== Christianity ==
In 1825, Mswati II invited Methodist missionaries to his kingdom. The first church to be established in the country was the Methodist Wesleyan Mission in Mahamba in 1844. The Christian missions largely failed through 1881, and had few conversions to their credit. A larger presence of missionaries began in 1881 when members of the United Society arrived to establish the presence of the Church of England. Lutherans arrived in 1887 from Germany, and Methodists restarted their efforts in 1895 out of their Christian missions in South Africa.

A Gothic-style church built in 1912 still stands in Mahamba, and is the oldest-extant Christian place of worship in the country. A large Catholic presence, including churches, schools, and other infrastructure, exists in the country which constitutes a single ecclesiastical jurisdiction: the Diocese of Manzini. The local Zionist Churches, which syncretise Christianity and indigenous ancestral worship, and were developed in the early part of the 19th century, predominate in rural areas. Christian holidays such as Good Friday, Christmas, and Ascension Day are part of the national holiday calendar.

Christianity for the Swazi people incorporates the rituals, singing, dancing and iconography of the traditional Swazi religion. According to Sibongile Nxumalo, Christian missionaries that ignored or misconstrued "the positive aspects of traditional beliefs, customs and institutions of Swazi society" have largely been unsuccessful. More successful missions have adopted a syncretic approach.

Christian organizations in Eswatini have been closely involved in the politics of the country. The colonial-era Swaziland League of African Churches has had a long relationship with the Eswatini royal family, and held public ceremonies such as Easter on the behalf of the King. Zionist churches celebrate Good Friday over three days with singing and dancing. While historically apolitical, in 2004 they campaigned to make Christianity the state religion through a constitutional amendment, which King Mswati III opposed. The third politically influential Christian organization in Eswatini is the Council of Eswatini Churches, established in 1976 as refugees flooded into the country. The organisation’s views on apartheid in South Africa and the civil war in nearby Mozambique contradicted official government stances, hence Council leaders being threatened with arrests and prison.

== Swazi religion ==
The traditional Swazi religion recognizes a supreme creator god, but more important are the spirits of ancestors. The creator, known as Mvelincanti (“He who was there from the beginning”), is too remote and so the ancestral spirits (emadloti) are more relevant in daily life. Beasts are sacrificed and beer is brewed to propitiate the spirits in asking for help. The rituals are performed at the family level for milestones such as birth, death, and marriage. Some Swazis blend these traditions with contemporary Christian practices.

=== Incwala ===
In the hierarchy of Swazi society, the king assumes the leadership position. The Incwala ritual performed annually is considered a national religious event. The objectives of the event are to reflect the growth of the king, thank the ancestors for good harvests, and pray for good rain in the coming year. This event, which only takes place when there is a king, and all male Swazis are participant. The official holiday for Incwala is determined by lunar phases, and is at the end of the six-week event.

== Other religions ==
Followers of Islam, the Baháʼí Faith, Hinduism and Judaism are largely immigrants located in urban areas. According to the United States Department of State, Muslims form about 2% of the population, which is the same data as in the CIA World Factbook, while the government estimates report less than 0.2% of the population being Muslim. Eswatini’s Muslims are descendants of former indentured workers who arrived from South Asia during the British colonial era.

== Freedom of religion ==
In 2023, the country was scored 2 out of 4 for religious freedom by the American nonprofit organisation, Freedom House.

== See also ==
- Catholic Church in Eswatini
- History of the Jews in Eswatini
- Islam in Eswatini
