= .sz =

Internet country code top-level domain for Eswatini

- Introduced: 19 July 1993
- TLD type: Country code top-level domain
- Status: Active
- Registry: SISPA
- Sponsor: University of Eswatini
- Intended use: Entities connected with Eswatini
- Actual use: Gets some use in Eswatini
- Registration restrictions: Local presence requirement; must have bona fide intention to use name on a regular basis
- Structure: Registrations are at the third level beneath various second-level names
- Documents: Terms and conditions
- Dispute policies: Registry does not act as arbiter of disputes
- Registry website: SISPA

.sz is the Internet country code top-level domain (ccTLD) for Eswatini. The Eswatini ISP Association ("SISPA") is responsible for assigning .SZ domain names.

The two-letter abbreviation refers to Swaziland, the country's former name from 1968 to 2018.

== Second level domains ==
There are four second-level domains:

- co.sz: Commercial entities
- ac.sz: Academic institutions
- org.sz: Non-commercial organizations
- gov.sz: Reserved for government usage
