= Swaziland United Democratic Front =

SUDF
- Swaziland United Democratic Front
- Founded: 2008
- Headquarters: Manzini, Swaziland
- Location: Swaziland
- Key people: Sipho Kunene, Chairperson; Mduduzi Gina, secretary
- Website: Official website

The Swaziland United Democratic Front is a coalition of pro-democracy interests including political parties, trade unions and churches. The Swaziland United Democratic Front was formed on 2 February 2008 at the Tum's George Hotel in Manzini, Swaziland, attended by 120 persons from various organizations but mainly from the following:

- People's United Democratic Movement (PUDEMO)
- Ngwane National Liberatory Congress (NNLC)
- Swaziland Federation of Trade Unions (SFTU)
- Swaziland Federation of Labour (SFL)
- Swaziland National Association of Teachers (SNAT)
- Swaziland National Union of Students (SNUS) (tertiary institutions)
- Swaziland Association of Students (SAS) (primary and high schools)
- Swaziland National Ex-Mineworkers Association (SNEMA)
- Coalition of Informal Economy Association of Swaziland

The numbers made up by the individual members of all these organizations is about 100 000.

== Mission of the SUDF ==
The founding of the SUDF was the result of a growing conviction that in order to create a strong civil society that could work actively for democratization and poverty eradication, there would have to be more unity and coordination among the civil society organisations of Swaziland.

The formation of the SUDF is a concerted attempt of these organisations to increase the space for democratic participation for and by the socio-economically and politically marginalized people of Swaziland. The existing space for protest action is currently limited to the unions, who have secured themselves this space through the Industrial Act. Since the unions are member organisations of the SUDF, the SUDF is therefore in a strong position to expand the space for this type of action.

In 2009, 5000 members of the SUDF agreed on the Manzini Declaration. The Manzini Declaration constitutes a mission statement, which affirms the SUDFs commitment to human rights and sets out its views on a number of substantive issues in relation to the basic rights of people in Swaziland and the social and political development in the country.

== Key people ==
- Vincent Ncongwane, former secretary-general

== See also ==
- United Democratic Front (UDF), a historic South African anti-apartheid organisation.
