= List of international presidential trips made by Cyril Ramaphosa =

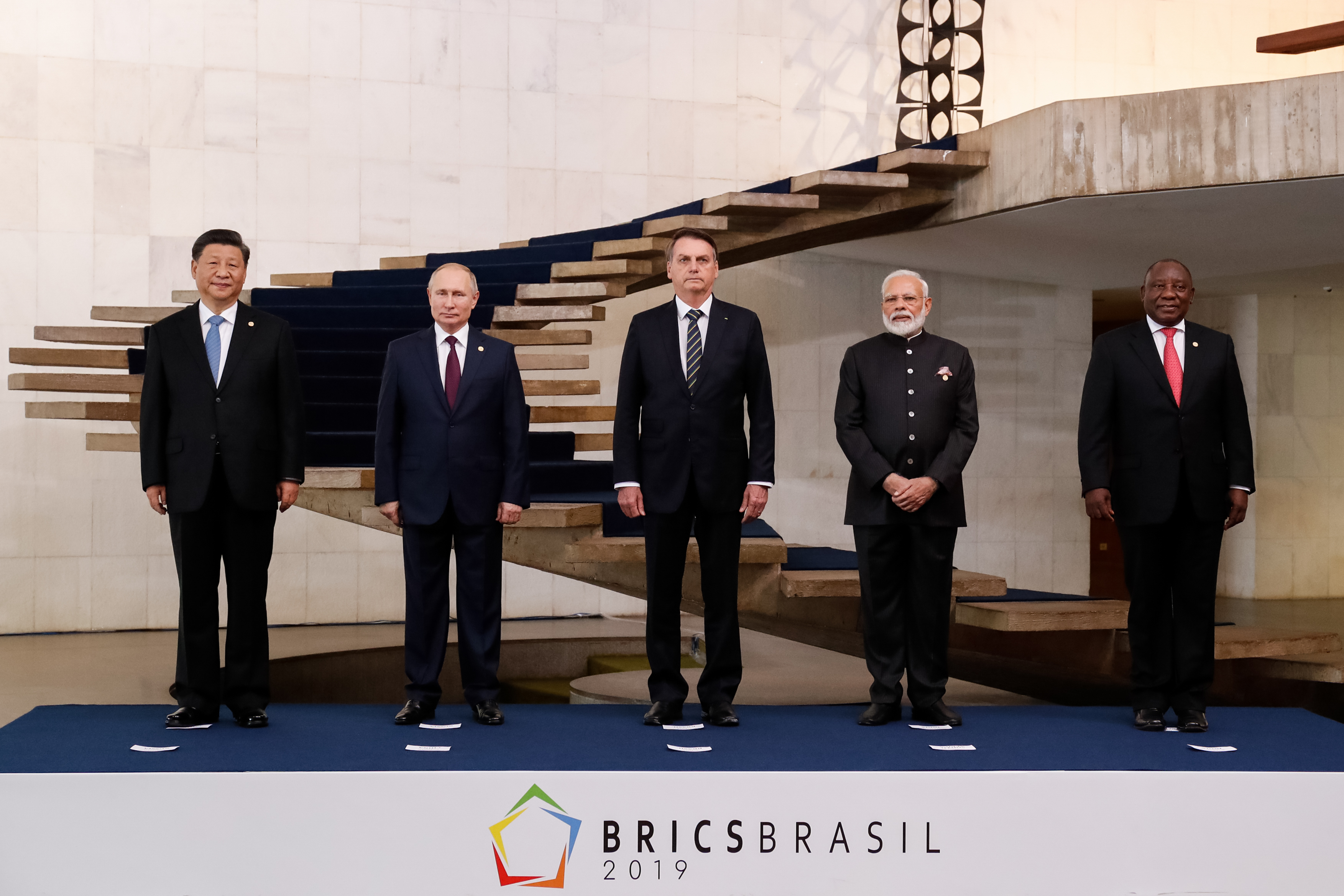
Cyril Ramaphosa posing for a photo with other BRICS heads of state during the 11th BRICS summit in 2019.

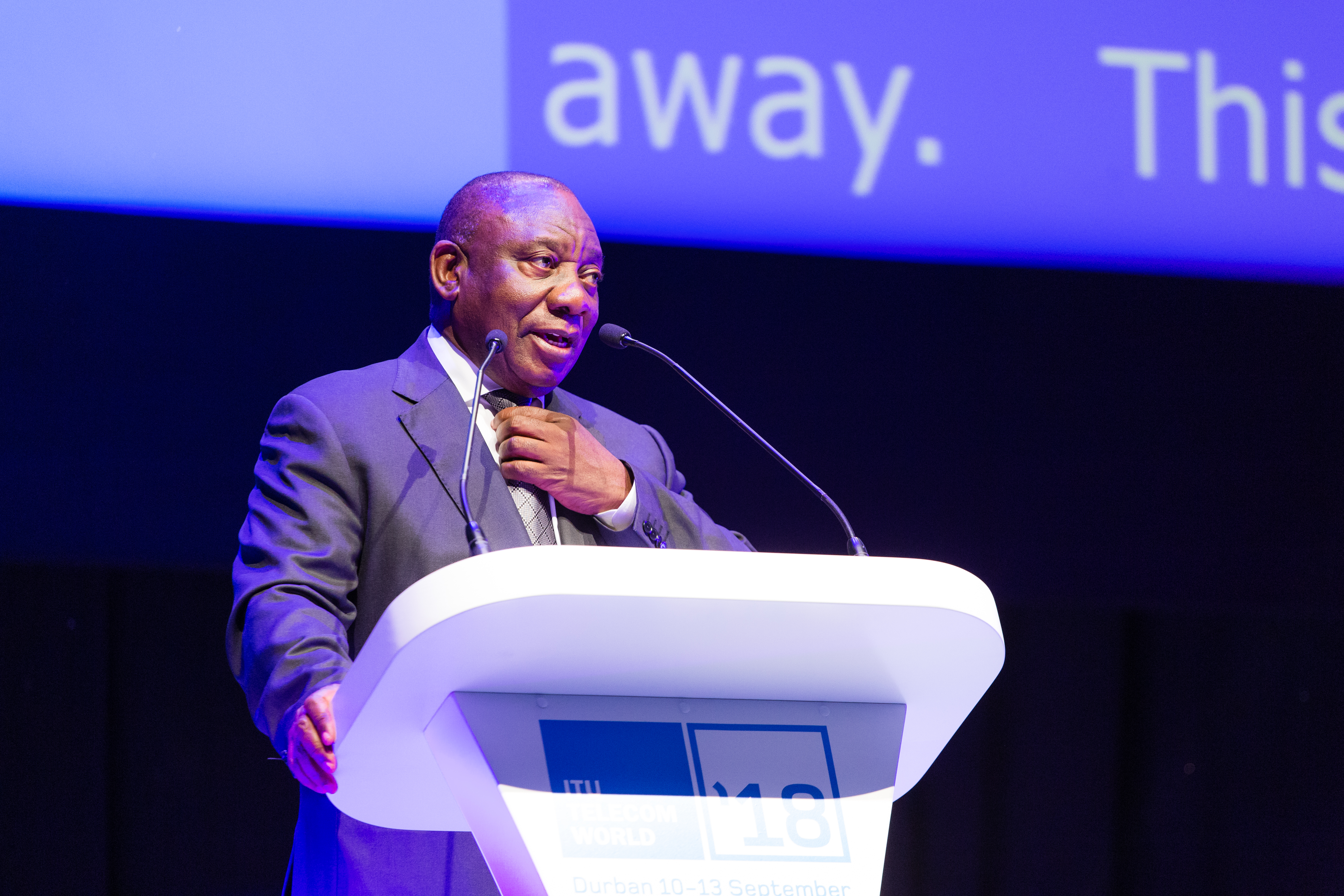
Cyril Ramaphosa speaking at the ITU Telecom World in 2018 in Geneva, Switzerland.

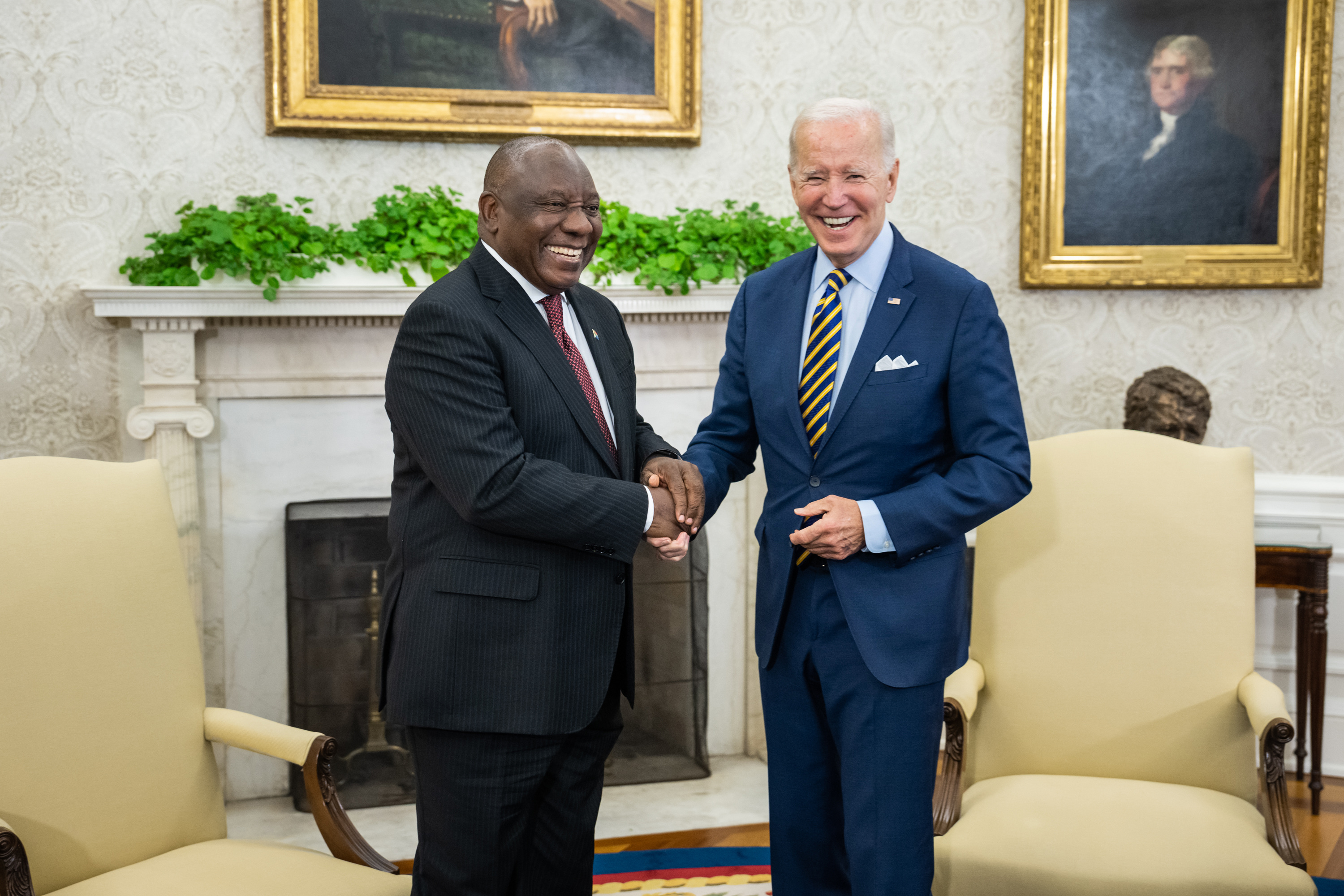
Cyril Ramaphosa meeting with President Joe Biden at the White House in Washington, D.C. in 2022.

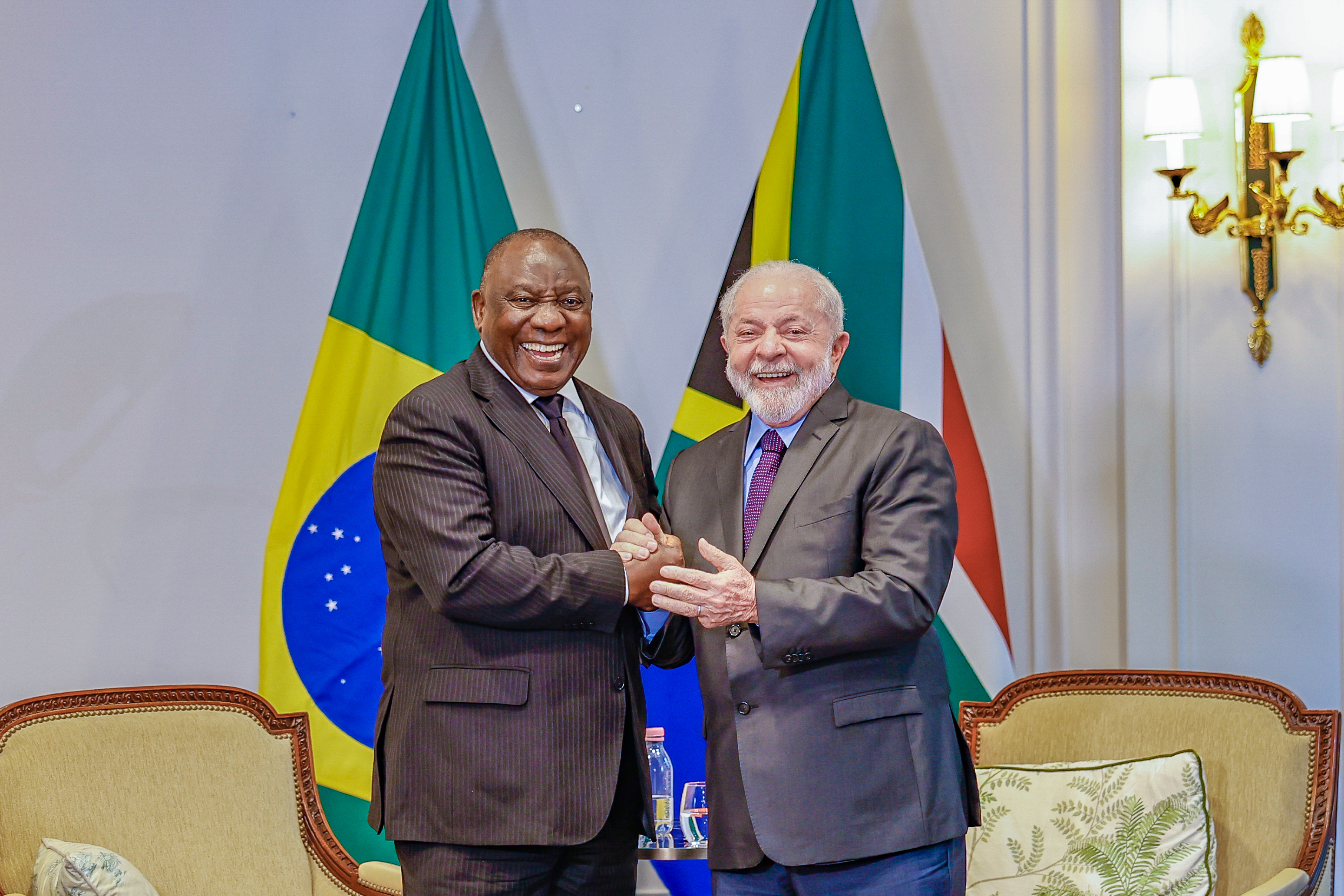
Cyril Ramaphosa meeting with Brazilian president Luiz Inácio Lula da Silva, in Paris, 2023

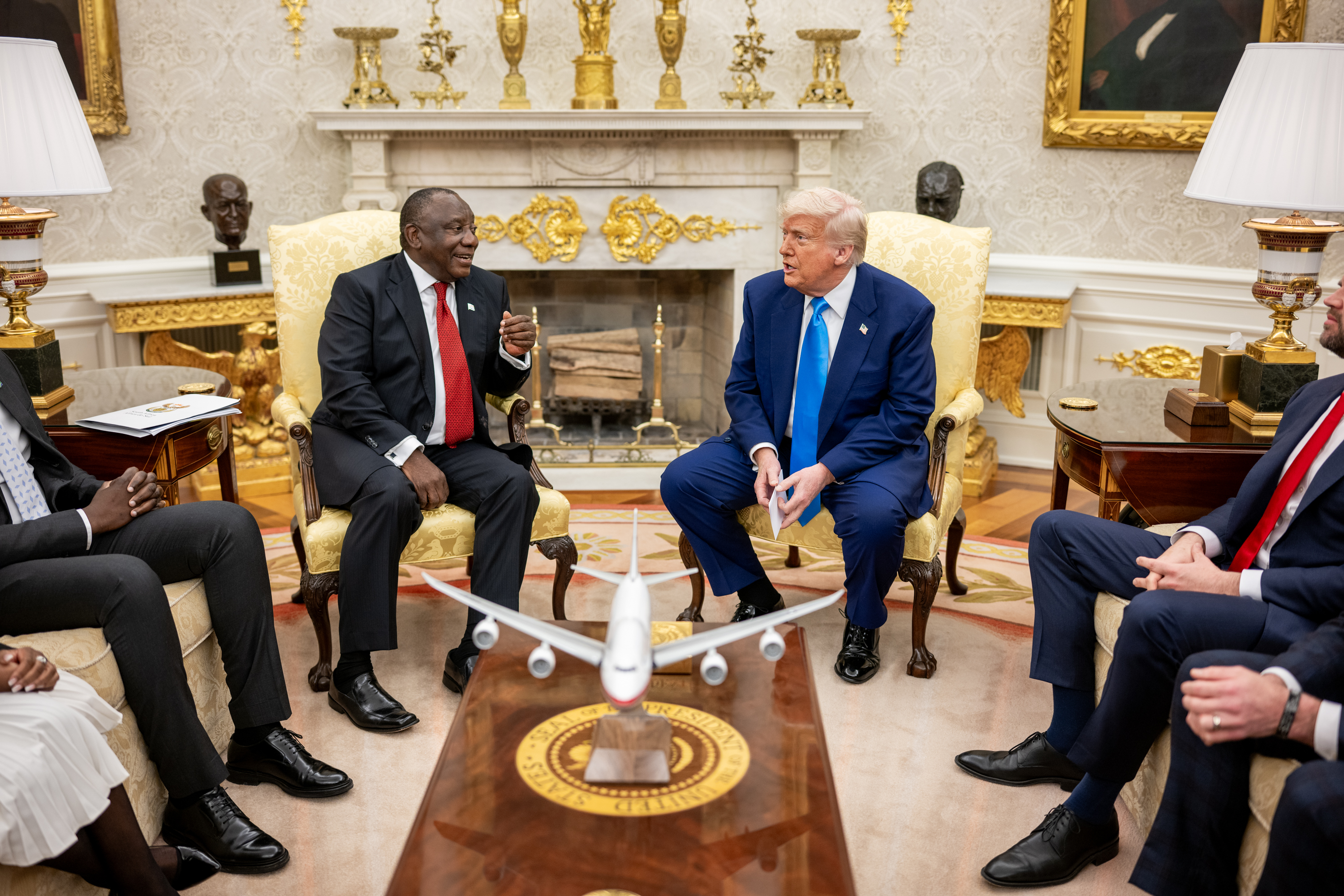
Ramaphosa with U.S. President Donald Trump in the White House, 21 May 2025

This is a list of international presidential trips made by Cyril Ramaphosa while President. Ramaphosa assumed the office of president on 15 February 2018 and made his first international trip as the President of South Africa to Luanda, Angola.

== Summary of international trips ==
Map showing International trips made by Ramaphosa as President 1 Visit 2 Visits 3 Visits 4 Visits 5+ Visits South Africa

Number of visits	Country
1 visit	Algeria, Argentina, Belgium, Burundi, Guinea, Malawi, Malaysia, Mauritania, Niger, Senegal, South Sudan, Qatar, Tanzania, Togo, Ukraine, Uganda, Vietnam, Zambia
2 visits	Botswana, Canada, China, Côte d'Ivoire, Germany, Ghana, India, Indonesia, Rwanda, Saudi Arabia, Switzerland
3 visits	Democratic Republic of Congo, Egypt, Nigeria, Switzerland, United Arab Emirates
4 visits	Angola, Brazil, Eswatini, France, Japan, Lesotho, United Kingdom, Russia
5 visits	Mozambique
6 visits	Ethiopia, Namibia,
7 visits	United States, Zimbabwe

== 2018 ==
Country	Locations	Dates	Details
Angola	Luanda	2 March	Held a consultative meeting with President João Lourenço in his capacity as chair of the SADC.
Botswana	Gaborone	3 March	Met with President Ian Khama on a consultative meeting as head of the SADC.
Mozambique	Maputo	17 March	Held a consultative meeting with the President of Mozambique Filipe Nyusi.
Zimbabwe	Harare	17 March	Paid a courtesy visit to President Emmerson Mnangagwa.
Rwanda	Kigali	20–21 March	Paid a courtesy visit to President Paul Kagame, was a panelist at the African Continental Free Trade Area Business Forum, and signed the African Union Kigali Declaration
United Kingdom	London	17–19 April	Makes courtesy visit to Elizabeth II and held bilateral talks with Prime Minister Theresa May. Also addressed African leaders at the African Leaders Roundtable of the Commonwealth Business Forum, and attended the Commonwealth Heads of Government Meeting.
Angola	Luanda	25 April	SADC Troika Heads of State and Government summit.
Switzerland	Geneva	15–16 May	Co-chaired the International Labour Organization Global Commission with the Swedish Prime Minister Stefan Löfven.
Canada	Québec City, Toronto	8–10 June	Attended the 44th G7 summit. Also attended a South Africa-Canada Investor engagement.
Botswana	Gaborone	29 June	Attended the 6th Southern African Customs Union Summit.
Mauritania	Nouakchott	1–2 July	Attended the 31st Ordinary Session of the Assembly of Heads of State and Government of the African Union.
Nigeria	Lagos	10–11 July	Met with President Muhammadu Buhari, and attended the 2018 Annual Meeting and 25th Anniversary Celebrations of the African Export-Import Bank.
Saudi Arabia	Jeddah	12 July	State visit with King Salman of Saudi Arabia.
United Arab Emirates	Abu Dhabi	13 July	Met with Sheikh Mohammed Bin Zayed Al Nahyan.
Zambia	Lusaka	9–10 August	Met President Edgar Lungu at State House ahead of bilateral discussions. Also signed an agreement to establish a South Africa-Zambia Bi-National Commission.
Democratic Republic of Congo	Kinshasa	10 August	Met President Joseph Kabila to discuss the political and security situation. Ramaphosa also commends President Kabila for honouring the Congolese Constitution.
Namibia	Windhoek	16–18 August	Met President Hage Geingob, and opened the 30th Ordinary SADC Heads of State and Government Summit as the outgoing SADC chairperson.
Zimbabwe	Harare	26 August	Attended the inauguration of Emmerson Mnangagwa.
China	Beijing	31 August – 3 September	Attended the African-Chinese summit.
United States	New York City	25–27 September	Attended the Seventy-third session of the United Nations General Assembly.
Germany	Berlin	29–30 October	Attended G20 Africa Conference and met Chancellor Angela Merkel.
France	Strasbourg	14 November	Addressed the European Parliament and met with European Parliament President Antonio Tajani.
Belgium	Brussels	14–15 November	Met with King Philippe of Belgium and Prime Minister Charles Michel. Also attended the 7th South Africa-European Union Summit.
Switzerland	Geneva	15–16 November	Co-chaired the Global Commission on the Future of Work at the headquarters of the International Labour Organization.
Ethiopia	Addis Ababa	17 November	Attended the 11th Extraordinary Session of the Assembly of Heads of State and Government of the African Union.
Argentina	Buenos Aires	30 November – 1 December	Attended the 2018 G20 Buenos Aires summit.

== 2019 ==
Country	Locations	Dates	Details
Mozambique	Maputo	14 January	Met with President Filipe Nyusi.
Switzerland	Davos	22–25 January	Attended the World Economic Forum.
India	New Delhi	25–26 January	Address the India-South Africa Business Forum and deliver the Gandhi-Mandela Freedom Lecture organised by the Indian Council of World Affairs as a part of celebrations of the 15th anniversary of the IBSA (India, Brazil, South Africa) Dialogue Forum. Also was the Chief Guest for Republic Day Parade.
Ethiopia	Addis Ababa	10–11 February	Attended the 32nd Ordinary Session of the Assembly of the African Union Heads of State and Government.
Eswatini	Mbabane	3 March	Met with King Mswati III.
Zimbabwe	Harare	12 March	Co-chaired the third session of the South Africa-Zimbabwe Bi-National Commission with President Emmerson Mnangagwa.
Egypt	Cairo	22 April	Attended an emergency African Union Troika Summit convened to discuss Sudan and Libya.
Japan	Osaka	28–29 June	Attended the 2019 G20 Osaka summit.
Lesotho	Maseru	4 July	Met with Prime Minister Thomas Thabane and King Letsie III.
Niger	Niamey	7–8 July	Attended the 12th Extraordinary Summit of the African Union. The summit will entry into force of the Agreement on the Establishment of the African Continental Free Trade Area
Tanzania	Dar es Salaam, Morogoro	14–15 August	State visit with President John Magufuli. He also visits Morogoro to see the remains of a fuel tanker explosion express solidarity.
France	Biarritz	25–26 August	Attended the 45th G7 summit.
Japan	Yokohama	27–30 August.	Attended the seventh Tokyo International Conference on African Development. Also attended the Japan-South Africa Business Expo.
Zimbabwe	Harare	14 September	Attended Robert Mugabe's state funeral.
United Kingdom	London	13–14 October	Attended the 6th Financial Times Africa Summit.
Russia	Sochi	23–24 October	Attended the first Russia-Africa Summit.
Japan	Yokohama	31 October	Attended the 2019 Rugby World Cup Final.
Brazil	Brasília	13–14 November	Attended the 11th BRICS summit.
Lesotho	Maseru	27 November	Met with Prime Minister Thomas Thabane and attended the closing ceremony of the Multi-stakeholder National Dialogue Plenary II.
Guinea	Conakry	4 December	Met with President Alpha Condé.
Ghana	Accra	4–5 December	Met with President Nana Akufo-Addo and also co-chaired the Ghana-South Africa Business Round Table.
Togo	Lomé	5–6 December	Met with President Faure Gnassingbé and attended a state banquet.
Egypt	Aswan	11 December	Met with President Abdel Fattah el-Sisi and participated in the inaugural session of the Aswan Forum for Sustainable Peace and Development.

== 2020 ==
Country	Locations	Dates	Details
Mozambique	Maputo	15 January	Attended the inauguration of President Filipe Nyusi.
Ethiopia	Addis Ababa	9–10 February	Attended the 33rd Ordinary Session of the Heads of State and Government of the African Union, at which South Africa officially assumed the chair of the Union.

== 2021 ==
Country	Locations	Dates	Details
Mozambique	Maputo	8 April	Attended an Extraordinary Double Troika Summit of the Heads of State and Government of the SADC, to discuss the security situation in Mozambique.
Germany	Berlin	26–27 August	Attended a G20 Compact with Africa meeting.
Eswatini	Mbabane	2 November	Met with Mswati III to discuss the political and security situation in Eswatini.
Nigeria	Lagos	30 November – 1 December	State visit at the invitation of President Muhammadu Buhari, and the 10th session of the Nigeria-South Africa Bi-National Commission.
Côte d'Ivoire	Abidjan	2–3 December	State visit with President Alassane Ouattara (South Africa's first ever), and opening address at the Africa Investment Forum.
Ghana	Accra	4–5 December	State visit with President Nana Akufo-Addo, and inaugural session of the Ghana-South Africa Bi-National Commission.
Senegal	Dakar	6–7 December	Official visit, including to attend the Dakar Peace and Security Forum and sign bilateral agreements.

== 2022 ==
Country	Locations	Dates	Details
Malawi	Lilongwe	12 January	Attended the SADC Extraordinary Summits in Malawi. The summit extended the funding and mandate for the Southern African Development Community Mission in Mozambique (SAMIM).
Democratic Republic of Congo	Kinshasa	17–18 August	42nd Ordinary Summit of SADC Heads of State
United States	Washington, D.C.	15–17 September	Working visit
United Kingdom	London	19 September	Attended state funeral of Elizabeth II
Saudi Arabia	Jeddah	15–16 October	State visit
Indonesia	Bali	November 14–16	Attended the 2022 G20 Summit. Met with President Joko Widodo. Held bilateral meetings with Chinese President Xi Jinping, Prime Minister of the Netherlands Mark Rutte, Prime Minister of the Republic of Singapore Lee Hsien Loong
United Kingdom	London	22–23 November	State visit

== 2023 ==
Country	Locations	Dates	Details
Namibia	Windhoek	31 January	Attended the Extraordinary SADC Troika Summit to discuss the regional peace and security situation
Ethiopia	Addis Ababa	17–19 February	Attended the 36th Ordinary Session of the Heads of State and Government of the African Union.
Burundi	Bujumbura	6 May	Attended the 11th high-level meeting of the Regional Oversight Mechanism of the Peace, Security and Cooperation Framework for the Democratic Republic of the Congo and the Great Lakes region.
Namibia	Windhoek	8 May	Attended the Extra-Ordinary Summit of Organ Troika, Plus SADC Troika and Force Intervention Brigade Troop Contributing Countries Heads of State and Government. The future deployment and coordination of various forces currently engaged in the M23 offensive in Eastern Democratic Republic of the Congo was discussed.
Nigeria	Abuja	28–29 May	Attended the Inauguration of President Bola Tinubu after his win of the 2023 Nigerian presidential election.
Switzerland	Geneva	15 June	Attended the World of Work Summit on the margins of the 111th Session of the International Labour Conference (ILC).
Ukraine	Kyiv	16 June	Attended as part of the African Peace Mission to Ukraine.
Russia	Moscow	17 June	Attended as part of the African Union Peace Delegation.
France	Paris	22-23 June	Attended the New Global Financing Pact summit.
Eswatini	Mbabane	29 June	Participate at the 8th Southern Africa Customs Union (SACU) Heads of State and Government Summit.
Democratic Republic of Congo	Kinshasa	6 July	President Cyril Ramaphosa together with together with President Félix Tshisekedi, co-chaired the Heads of State and Government segment of the 12th session of the DRC –South Africa Bi-National Commission (BNC).
Russia	Moscow	26–29 July	Attended the Russia-Africa Summit 2023.
Angola	Luanda	16–17 August	Attended the SADC summit.
India	New Delhi	8–10 September	Attended the G20 New Delhi summit.
United States	New York	17–21 September	Working visit.
Namibia	Windhoek	13 October	Met with the Namibian president Hage Geingob.
Egypt	Cairo	21 October	Attended the Cairo Summit for Peace, met with the Egyptian president Abdel Fattah el-Sisi.
Qatar	Doha	14–15 November	Met with the Emir of Qatar Tamim bin Hamad Al Thani.
United Arab Emirates	Dubai	2 December	Working visit.

== 2024 ==
Country	Locations	Dates	Details
Uganda	Kampala	18 January	Attended the Non-Aligned Movement summit.
Namibia	Windhoek	10 February	Working visit.
Ethiopia	Addis Ababa	16–19 February	Attended the 37th African Union summit.
Eswatini	Mbabane	3 April	Working visit
Rwanda	Kigali	6-7 April	Working visit
South Sudan	Juba	16 April	Working visit
Angola	Luanda	7-8 August	Working visit
Zimbabwe	Harare	17 August	Attended the 44th Ordinary SADC Summit
China	Beijing	2-4 September	State visit
United States	New York City	22-24 September	Attended the UN General Assembly
Lesotho	Maseru	4 October	Working visit
Russia	Kazan	22–24 October	Attended the 16th BRICS summit.
Brazil	Rio de Janeiro	18–19 November	Attended the 2024 G20 Rio de Janeiro summit.
Algeria	Algiers	6 December	State visit

== 2025 ==
Country	Locations	Dates	Details
Mozambique	Maputo	15 January	Attended the inauguration of President-Elect Daniel Chapo
Switzerland	Davos	21 January	Attended the World Economic Forum
Zimbabwe	Harare	31 January	Attended the SADC Extraordinary Summit
Ethiopia	Addis Ababa	15 February	Attended the African Union Summit
Namibia	Windhoek	1 March	Attended the state funeral of former president Sam Nujoma
Lesotho	Maseru	22 April	Working visit
Ivory Coast	Abidjan	11-13 May	Working visit
United States	Washington, D.C.	19–21 May	Working visit
Canada	Kananaskis	16–17 June	Attended 51st G7 summit
Brazil	Rio de Janeiro	6-7 July	Attended the 17th BRICS summit
Japan	Tokyo, Yokohama	21-22 August	Attended the Tokyo International Conference on African Development Summit
Zimbabwe	Harare	29 August	Participated the Zimbabwe agricultural show
United States	New York City	22-24 September	Attended the Eightieth session of the United Nations General Assembly
Indonesia	Jakarta	22-23 October	State visit with President Prabowo Subianto.
Vietnam	Hanoi	23-24 October	State visit
Malaysia	Kuala Lumpur	24-27 October	State visit and attended the 47th ASEAN Summit.

== 2026 ==
Country	Locations	Dates	Details
United Arab Emirates	Abu Dhabi	12 January	Official visit.
Ethiopia	Addis Ababa	14-15 February	Attended the African Union Summit.
United States	Chicago	6-7 March	Delivered tribute to late human rights campaigner Jesse Jackson.
Brazil	Brasília	8-9 March	State visit.
Eswatini	Mbabane	25 April	Working visit.
France	Paris	10-12 July	Working visit.
India	New Delhi	12-13 September	Attended the 18th BRICS summit.
United States	San Jose, Silicon Valley	15-21 November	Working visit about Artificial intelligence.

== Multilateral meetings ==
Multilateral meetings of the following intergovernmental organizations took place during Cyril Ramaphosa's presidency (2018 – present).

Group	Year							
Group	2018	2019	2020	2021	2022	2023	2024	2025
BRICS	25–27 July, (South Africa) Johannesburg	13–14 November, (Brazil) Brasília	17 November, (Russia) Saint Petersburg	9 September, (India) New Delhi	23 June, (China) Beijing	22–24 August, (South Africa) Johannesburg	22–24 October, (Russia) Kazan	6–7 July, (Brazil) Rio de Janeiro
G7	8–9 June, (Canada) La Malbaie	24–26 August, (France) Biarritz	Not a G7 Member	11–13 June, (United Kingdom) Carbis Bay	26–28 June, (Germany) Schloss Elmau	Not a G7 Member		16–17 June, (Canada) Kananaskis
G20	30 November – 1 December, (Argentina) Buenos Aires	28–29 June, (Japan) Osaka	21–22 November, (Saudi Arabia) Riyadh (videoconference)	30–31 October, (Italy) Rome	15–16 November, (Indonesia) Bali	9–10 September, (India) New Delhi	18–19 November, (Brazil) Rio de Janeiro	22–23 November, (South Africa) Johannesburg
CHOGM	18–20 April, (United Kingdom) London	None			24–25 June, (Rwanda) Kigali	5–6 May^{[a]}, (United Kingdom) London	25–26 October, (Samoa) Apia	None
Others	None				U.S.–Africa Summit; 13–15 December, (United States) Washington, D.C.	Russia–Africa Summit; 27–28 July, Saint Petersburg		
██ = Did not attend;^aMinister of International Relations and Cooperation Naledi Pandor attended in the President's place. ██ = Future event.
