= Unthinkable (disambiguation) =

Unthinkable is a 2010 American film.

Unthinkable may also refer to:

- The Unthinkable (1926 film), a Polish film
- The Unthinkable (2018 film), a Swedish film
- The Unthinkable (2021 film), a Swazi film
- "Unthinkable (Arrow)", season 2 episode of Arrow
- "Un-Thinkable (I'm Ready)", Alicia Keys song
- "Unthinkable", song from Allfrumtha I (album) by Allfrumtha I
- Unthinkable: An Extraordinary Journey Through the World's Strangest Brains, a 2018 nonfiction book by Helen Thomson

== See also ==
- Operation Unthinkable, British plan to attack the Soviet Union in 1945
