= 2021–2023 Eswatini protests =

Anti-monarchy and pro-democracy acts

- Date: 20 June 2021 – c. summer 2023
- Location: Eswatini; solidarity protests in South Africa
- Caused by: Authoritarian rule and suppression of opposition; Misuse of the country's funds by the monarchy; Government's handling of the COVID-19 pandemic
- Goals: Democratic reforms; End of the king's absolute rule; Constitutional monarchy
- Methods: Peaceful demonstrations; Blockades and tyre-burning and harassing travellers; Arson and looting; Burning of public and private property; Strike action
- Result: Protests suppressed

Parties
(Eswatini) Opposition: Communist Party of Swaziland (CPS); Members of parliament who are arrested for the initiative Pro-democratic movement.; People's United Democratic Movement (PUDEMO); Ngwane National Liberatory Congress (NNLC); Swazi Democratic Party (SWADEPA); Economic Freedom Fighters of Swaziland (EFFSWA); African United Democratic Party (AUDP); Mass Democratic Movement (MDM); Swaziland International Solidarity Forces (SISF)	Government: Royal Eswatini Police Service (REPS); Umbutfo Eswatini Defence Force (UEDF); Pro-government protesters

Lead figures
No centralized leadership	King Mswati III

Casualties and losses
Dead: 27 (official number) - Government; 24+ (Bloomberg, 3 July); 50+ (PUDEMO claim, 1 July); Injured: 28 (Al Jazeera); 300+ (PUDEMO)	

A series of protests in Eswatini against the absolute monarchy and for democratisation began in late June 2021. Starting as a peaceful protest on 20 June, they escalated after 25 June into violence and looting over the weekend when the government took a hardline stance against the demonstrations and prohibited the delivery of petitions. Lower-level unrest and protests continued until summer 2023.

== Background and cause ==
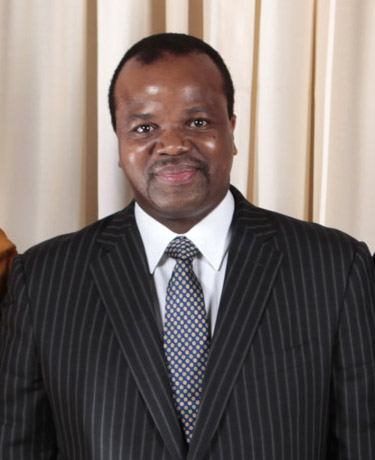
Mswati III in 2009

Eswatini is one of the world’s few countries (and the only in Africa) that is an absolute monarchy, with Mswati III having been the King since 1986. Political parties have been banned since 1973, under the preceding King Sobhuza II, due to a "state of emergency" that has remained to this day, and are heavily persecuted under "anti-terrorism" laws. The prime minister is appointed by the monarch. Although protests are reportedly rare, there have been demonstrations in 2018 and 2019 over Mswati III's lavish lifestyle and alleged misuse of public funds. A series of UN-hosted discussions in 2020 displayed support for a democratic, constitutional monarchy in the country. According to Afrobarometer, trust in government institutions, including the monarchy, has significantly decreased over the past several years and citizens are seeking alternatives to authoritarian rule.

The immediate cause of the protest was when three pro-democracy MPs advocated for the introduction of a more democratic system. In addition, the death of a college student under mysterious circumstances in May led to suspicions that the police had killed him and subsequent protests at the time, which were supported by opposition legislators and led to a state of preexisting tension.

== Events ==
=== 2021 ===
The first protests took place on 20 June when rural youth in Manzini Region went through a village shouting political slogans and calling for the right to a democratically chosen prime minister. They blocked roads and set tyres on fire. Police reacted to these demonstrations by deploying stun grenades and firing live bullets, leading to protesters retaliating by throwing rocks.

The protests spread and escalated into violence on 25 June in Msunduza township, near Mbabane, as demonstrators clashed with police and stores were looted and burned. As thousands of people delivered petitions to tinkhundla authorities, who are democratically appointed in a "devolved" system, the government stopped them from being delivered, raising controversy from the national teachers union and leading to further unrest.

On the night of 28–29 June, it was speculated that King Mswati III had fled Eswatini amidst increasing disorder. The government denied these reports. However, it was reported that his private plane had been spotted departing the country. The Communist Party of Swaziland claimed that he had fled to South Africa, while the Swaziland Solidarity Network said that he was in Mozambique and had instructed security forces to "brutally suppress" the protests. On 29 June 2021, the demonstrations continued with police trying to repel the protesters with gunfire and tear gas with both the riot police and the army present on the streets. Police also set blockades across the capital and the government closed schools and bus stations. A curfew was put into place between 18:00 and 5:00 by the government to try to rout the violence, and business and schools were made to close. Despite this, protests and looting continued on the 30th, and the police and army used deadly force against demonstrators, with internet access becoming limited.

The army was officially called in on 1 July to "protect critical national infrastructure and enforce the COVID-19 regulations", according to acting Prime Minister, Themba Masuku, who also state that this didn't mean martial law was in place.

On 21 July, two MPs, Mduduzi Bacede Mabuza and Mthandeni Dube were arrested on charges of inciting violence at the protests. In July 2024, they were convicted and sentenced to 25 and 18 years respectively in prison in what the Swaziland Solidarity Network described as "ridiculous" sentences.

As of late September, high school and university students were still protesting by launching a series of strikes.

On 1 October, thousands of protesters marched to the embassy of the United States in Mbabane to deliver a petition. Security forces dispersed the crowd with rubber bullets, teargas and live ammunition. One protester was reportedly shot in the head by police outside parliament.

On 22 October, police violently suppressed a protest of civil servants, injuring 30 nurses. In response, the Swaziland Democratic Nurses Union (SDNU) issued a statement that nurses are no longer treating police officers.

=== 2022 ===
Over the course of 2022, smaller protests organized by pro-democracy activists and other interest groups continued. In February, university students protested for scholarships and refund of hostels fees; security forces responded by arresting and torturing a number of student union leaders. In March, the Communist Party started an anti-monarchy campaign dubbed "Turn Up the Heat" including a number of rallies which were forcibly broken up by police. In April, police put down more student protests on university campuses in Mbabane and Manzini using teargas.

In November, a series of larger protests occurred. Unrest began when police officers entered the Prime Minister's estate to demand pay rises, while a royal relative, Chief Prince Mahloma of Zandondo, was murdered on 5 November. Two days later, a pro-democracy militant group called "Swaziland International Solidarity Forces" committed a number of attacks on police outposts, trucks, food stores, and government buildings across the country. On 10 November, about 100 minibus and bus drivers protested in Manzini for the release of four colleagues. However, the protest turned violent, with the protestors looting shops and burning a police station. The army was called in, and opened fire. Three people were injured.

=== 2023 ===
Unrest continued in 2023. On 21 January, human rights lawyer and leading pro-democracy activist Thulani Maseko was murdered by gunmen at his home, provoking outrage not just in Eswatini but also internationally. Hours before the killing, King Mswati III had held a speech at the Engabezweni royal residence, declaring that the pro-democracy activists had "started the violence first" and "more trouble was coming for them". In summer 2023, members of the Communist Party and PUDEMO organized further protests in memory of the 50th anniversary of King Sobhuza II's decree which banned political parties. Some protests were prevented by the mass deployment of security forces; others took place and ended in violent clashes between pro-democracy activists and police, with several people being wounded. In September, several opposition parties such as the Communist Party, PUDEMO, and EFF called for a boycott of the general election. Despite this, thousands voted during the election; some observers such as the Swaziland Council of Churches argued that the high turnout was connected to voter intimidation. From this point, the protests largely ceased.

=== Effects in South Africa ===
In 2021, at the border city of Oshoek, hundreds of trucks were stranded due to allegations of protesters targeting imports and the loss of Internet connections halting entry processing. The South African National Defence Force was requested to prevent further violence and losses by putting the trucks under their protection. On 1 July, the Economic Freedom Fighters forced the checkpoint in Mananga to close in support of the protests.

== Aftermath ==
By early 2024, unrest had generally ceased in Eswatini despite very low approval rates of the current government. Opposition figures argued that there had been no political change despite the protests and occasional promises of reform by the government. Meanwhile, security forces carried out a series of arrests and manhunts for Communist Party members, forcing several to go underground.

== Reactions ==
According to the Times of Swaziland, a number of government figures encouraged violence and a hard crackdown through their statements. National Commissioner of Police William Dlamini stated that the protests were "war"; although he later clarified that he still wished for calm and only wished to show that the police were dedicated to restoring order, the editor of the Times blamed this statement, the prohibition of petitions, and a call from Housing and Urban Development Minister Prince Simelane to "fight fire with fire" for inflaming the situation.

The largest opposition party, the People's United Democratic Movement, announced a press conference to be held on 29 June. According to party leader Wandile Dludlu, over 250 people had been injured, some with bullets and broken bones, by government forces.

International NGO Human Rights Watch called for the government to "avoid arbitrary use of force" and that the protests should be "a wake-up call for the King and his government to heed the legitimate calls for reform", and the regional director of Amnesty International called the government's response a "full-frontal assault on human rights".

The governments of South Africa, the United States and the United Kingdom also expressed their concern, called for peace to be restored and stated that the right to peaceful protest should be heeded. The US also deployed additional marines to its embassy in Eswatini to bolster its security. South Africa's ruling party, the African National Congress, supported the reforms.

On 3 July, the Southern African Development Community (SADC) announced they would send a group of ministers to resolve the situation. On 21 October, Cyril Ramaphosa, in his capacity as chairperson of the security section of SADC, dispatched a multi-national team to meet with King Mswati III. The team was led by Jeff Radebe, and included officials from South Africa, Namibia and Botswana.

A feature film documentary entitled The Unthinkable was released on YouTube and SABC1 Cutting Edge outlining the events and accounts of the survivors of the massacre. The film was produced and directed by Comfort Ndzinisa in association with Eswatini Solidarity Fund.
