= Wonder Mkhonza =

Wander Mkhonza is the Secretary General of the Amalgamated Trade Union of Swaziland (ATUSWA). He has previously served as the national leader of the banned and largest political party in Eswatini, the People's United Democratic Movement (PUDEMO). He was elected the National Organising Secretary at PUDEMO's 2011 congress. Prior to this position he was the Deputy Secretary General, a position he held till the last congress. He has served PUDEMO in various levels including chairperson of Nhlangano Branch of PUDEMO, Chairperson of the Shiselweni Region of PUDEMO, which is also the home region of the President Mario Masuku. Mkhonza also sits in the National Disciplinary Committee of PUDEMO.

Wonder Mkhonza is also the Acting General Secretary of the Swaziland Processing Allied Workers Union (SPRWAWU), an affiliate of the now banned Trade Union Congress of Swaziland (TUCOSWA), of which he is a National General Council member.

Wonder Mkhonza was detained by Swazi police on Friday April 12, 2013, the 40th anniversary of Swaziland's state of emergency and the banning of all political parties, for being in possession of 5000 PUDEMO pamphlets. He was subsequently charged with sedition.

The "Free Wonder Mkhonza"-campaign, was started to campaign for his release. Wonder was released on bail on May 13, 2013.
