= Gabriel Mkhumane =

Gabriel Mkhumane (died April 1, 2008) was a Swazi physician and opposition leader. He was the deputy president of the People's United Democratic Movement (Pudemo), Swaziland's main opposition party.

Once working as a physician at Themba Hospital in Nelspruit, Mkhumane was in self-imposed exile, having left Swaziland in 1984 to live in Maputo, then in Cuba, where he received his medical training and lived for 15 years. According to the Swaziland Solidarity Network, he provided the impoverished with free medical services. To be nearer to his home country, Mkhumane settled in South Africa in 2000. He was married to Soraida and had two sons, Lizwi and Lizo (three weeks old at the time of his father's death). Despite his exile, he had been active in Pudemo-related activities such as marketing the Kingdom as an oppressive regime which hates democracy.

Mkhumane was murdered on April 1, 2008, in Nelspruit, after attending a meeting to discuss blocking goods travelling to Swaziland. The annual blockade was to be held on April 12, the anniversary of when King Sobhuza II outlawed all political parties. It was later called off due to Mkhumane's death. He was gunned down in an ambush on his car and his killers quickly left after the crime. The official version of his murder is that he was killed in a random act of villainy, although some Pudemo supporters disagree, including its president, Mario Masuku. They claim Mkhumane was murdered by the Swazi government, pointing to the fact that Swazi police told his mother that he would come home "wrapped in a black bag" hours before his death was reported. His family members also claimed he began fearing for his life shortly before his death.
