= Barnes Dlamini =

Barnes Dlamini is the president of the Swaziland Federation of Trade Unions (SFTU). Barnes was unanimously elected president at the SFTU congress in 2009, after having served at its vice president for four years. Barnes is also the president of the Swaziland United Democratic Front.
