= Mzwandile Masuku =

Human rights lawyer

- Occupation: Human rights attorney

Mzwandile Banele Masuku is a Swazi human rights lawyer and the son of the late prominent opposition leader, Mario Masuku.

Masuku's early life was characterized by political persecution and intimidation on account of his father's opposition to the regime of King Mswati III. His father was imprisoned for terrorism for shouting “Viva Pudemo” which was the name of Swaziland's banned political party.

In 2009, he launched a law firm dedicated to defending public rights with the late human rights lawyer, Thulani Maseko, that provides pro-bono legal defense for Swazis facing persecution by the state.
