= Mduduzi Bacede Mabuza =

Swazi politician and activist

Mduduzi Bacede Mabuza is a Swazi politician and pro-democracy activist. Formerly a member of the House of Assembly of Eswatini, he was arrested during the 2021 protests, and in 2024 was sentenced to 25 years in prison on charges of terrorism, sedition, and murder, in a trial condemned by national and international human rights organisations.

== Political career ==
Mabuza was elected as a member of parliament as an independent representing the Hosea inkhundla. He was a vocal critics of the Swazi electoral system, describing it as undemocratic, citing both the lack of official political parties and the overriding power of Eswatini's absolute monarch, Mswati III, over the Swazi parliament. In June 2021, Mabuza was among three pro-democracy MPs who advocated in parliament for the prime minister to become a democratically elected role, rather than chosen by the monarch. Mabuza ceased to be an MP following his arrest.

== Arrest, trial, and imprisonment ==
In June 2021, anti-monarchy protests broke out in Eswatini following an incident in a village in Manzini Region where someone publicly called for a democratically elected prime minister. The police responded to the protest with stun grenades and live bullets, leading to further protests breaking out across the country as the month progressed. Protests had already occurred on a smaller scale in May following the death of a university student, Thabani Nkomonye, who was alleged to have been killed by police officers.

Mabuza took part in protests that delivered petitions calling for an end to the tinkhundla system, and for it to be replaced with a "devolved" system of democratically chosen MPs. Protestors also demanded justice for Nkomonye, as well as a repeal of a decree issued by Mswati that banned petitions calling for democratic reforms in Eswatini.

=== Arrest ===
On 25 July 2021, Mabuza was arrested alongside fellow MP Mthandeni Dube. They were charged under the Suppression of Terrorism Act 2008 and the Sedition and Subversive Activities Act 1938. In addition, Mabuza faced an additional charge of breaching COVID-19 regulations during a gathering on 5 June, in contravention of the Disaster Management Act 2006. They were detained at Mbabane Police Station.

On 29 July, a bail hearing was held. Bail was refused for both Mabuza and Dube. A public march was held in support of Mabuza and Dube outside the court in Mbabane during the hearing. Bail was further denied on 15 December 2022 and at least one other occasion.

On 1 October 2021, over 10, 000 people marched to the United States embassy to deliver a petition calling for Mabuza and Dube's immediate release. The march was dispersed by authorities, and one marcher was critically injured after being shot in the head by a police officer. Later that month, on 20 October, police fired live ammunition and tear gas at a bus transporting people into Mbabane to protest Mabuza and Dube's ongoing incarceration.

During their detainment, concerns were raised that Mabuza had been beaten in custody and denied access to legal representation by human rights organisations including Amnesty International.

=== Trial ===
Mabuza pled not guilty to the charges against him, and his and Dube's joint trial began on 20 October 2021 at the High Court in Mbabane before Judge Mumcy Dlamini. They both faced an additional charge of murder, in relation to the deaths of two men, Siphosethu Mntshali and Thando Shongwe, who were hit by a car at roadblock set up by protestors on 29 June. Mabuza's defence stated that he had explained to protesters their constitutional rights and that he had not incited anyone to violence, while the Crown maintained that Mabuza knew the consequences of his speeches would lead to further violence and unrest, including by undermining government orders put in place to try to quell the protests.

During the trial, in October 2022 it was reported that Mabuza had been physically assaulted by officers while being transported to the court from custody. The men's trial concluded on 31 January 2023. The Crown requested that the men receive life sentences, while Mabuza and Dube's legal teams requested sentences not exceeding seven years.

On 1 June 2023, it was announced that Mabuza and Dube had been found guilty of terrorism, sedition, and murder. Mabuza was acquitted of an additional charge of contravening COVID-19 regulations. They were remanded pending sentencing. Mabuza and Dube's ongoing detainment during the court proceedings and afterwards was described as arbitrary detainment by Amnesty International; on 1 October 2023 they reported that Mabuza had been beaten again by officers while awaiting sentencing.

On 15 July 2024, Mabuza was sentenced to 85 years in prison; this equated to 25 years due to him receiving concurrent sentences. Dube was sentenced to 18 years in prison. The sentences were ordered to run from the date of their arrests in 2021.

=== Imprisonment ===
Having spent pre-trial detention in Mbabane Police Station, following his sentencing, Mabuza was transferred to the Matsapha Correctional Complex in Matsapha. It was subsequently reported that officers in the prison were refusing to give Mabuza his food rations, nor to permit him food received from his supporters outside the prison.

== Response ==
=== National response ===
The Swazi government did not officially comment on Mabuza's detainment. The Swaziland Solidarity Network described the sentences against Mabuza and Dube as "ridiculous" and praised them as "freedom fighters". The Swaziland Liberation Movement stated it was "appalled" by the sentences, which it felt was an attempt to "silence" members of parliament.

PUDEMO stated it was against the arrests and charging of any activists campaigning against Eswatini's tinkhundla system.

=== International response ===
Amnesty International had called Maduza's arrest a "travesty of justice", and after his conviction said that the Swazi authorities must quash the "unjust and baseless" convictions against Mabuza and Dube, calling it an attempt to suppress "peaceful dissent".

The United States embassy in Eswatini condemned Maduza's arrest.

Human Rights Watch stated that the men's convictions were based on the concept of dolus eventualis, and stated that the trial's judge, Mumcy Dlamini, "deliberately failed" to understand the concept. It called on the Swazi government to stop "weaponizing" the criminal justice system and to squash the convictions against Maduza and Dube.

== Personal life ==
Maduza was the 16th of 21 children and was a successful businessman before becoming a politician. He has multiple wives and 16 children.
