= Mlungisi Makhanya =

Swaziland human rights defender and politician (born 1978)

President of the People's United Democratic Movement
- Incumbent
- Assumed office 13 September 2018
- Deputy: Wandile Dludlu
- Preceded by: Mario Masuku

Secretary General of the People's United Democratic Movement
- In office February 2014 – September 2018
- Preceded by: Sikhumbuzo Phakathi
- Succeeded by: Wandile Dludlu

Personal details
- Born: Mlungisi Calvin Makhanya; 24 August 1978 (age 48) Mbabane, Hhohho, Eswatini
- Party: People's United Democratic Movement; Swaziland Youth Congress
- Education: University of Johannesburg
- Occupation: Human Rights Defender

Mlungisi Makhanya (born 24 August 1978) is a Swazi politician and human rights defender. He is the president of the People's United Democratic Movement. He previously served as Secretary General of the party during the presidency of longtime leader Mario Masuku.

== Arrest ==
On 24 April 2014 Makhanya was arrested and charged for giving support to a proscribed terrorist entity, the People's United Democratic Movement (PUDEMO), chanting 'terrorist slogans', wearing white T-shirts with PUDEMO written on it, wearing red and black PUDEMO berets, and reflecting 'terrorist demands' at the back. This was after a protest outside the Mbabane High Court during the 2014 trial of human rights lawyer and former secretary general of PUDEMO Thulani Maseko. On 29 August 2014 Mlungisi together with Thulani Maseko, Mario Masuku, Maxwell Dlamini and others successfully challenged the constitutionality of the Sedition and Subversive Activities Act of 1938 and the Suppression of Terrorism Act of 2008, which were used to arrest and charge him. The state however appealed the decision of the High Court and the Supreme Court upheld the Sedition and Subversive Activities and Suppression of Terrorism acts.

== Arson attack ==
On 20 September 2022 he survived an arson attack on his home with a hand grenade. The damage to the property is estimated at E1.5 million. The attack was condemned by South African political parties and trade unions including the Economic Freedom Fighters, the National Union of Metalworkers of South Africa, Amnesty International and SouthernDefenders. The Tibiyo Taka Ngwane owned newspaper, the Eswatini Observer labelled the arson attack an attack of convenience and characterized the accusation of the state for the attack as nonsensical.

== Poisoning ==
On 24 September 2024 it was reported that Makhanya, who had been exiled in South Africa since the 2022 arson attack which destroyed his Eswatini home, had been poisoned while inside his house in Pretoria. Mlungisi Makhanya was poisoned with organophosphates – chemicals used for pest control. The attempted assassination was condemned by the International Commission of Jurists who called on the South African Police Service to conduct a "prompt, thorough, and impartial investigation into the circumstances of Makhanya’s incapacitation, and to bring to justice any persons determined to be responsible". The poisoning attracted widespread condemnation in South Africa including from the ruling African National Congress, Economic Freedom Fighters, and the Congress of South African Trade Unions.

== See also ==
- Human rights in Eswatini
- People's United Democratic Movement
