= Vincent Ncongwane =

Vincent Ncongwane (1962-2021) was born on 19 April 1962 in South Africa and died on 7 October 2021. He was secretary general of the Swaziland United Democratic Front and secretary general of the Swaziland Federation of Labour and the Swaziland Union of Financial Institutions and Allied Workers.

He was also the secretary of the Labour Coordinating Council. He played a major role in the formation of the Labour Coordinating Council, which is the coordinating body of the two national labour centres (Swaziland Federation of Labour and Swaziland Federation of Trade Unions) and the stand-alone Swaziland National Teachers' Union.
