= Sipho Jele =

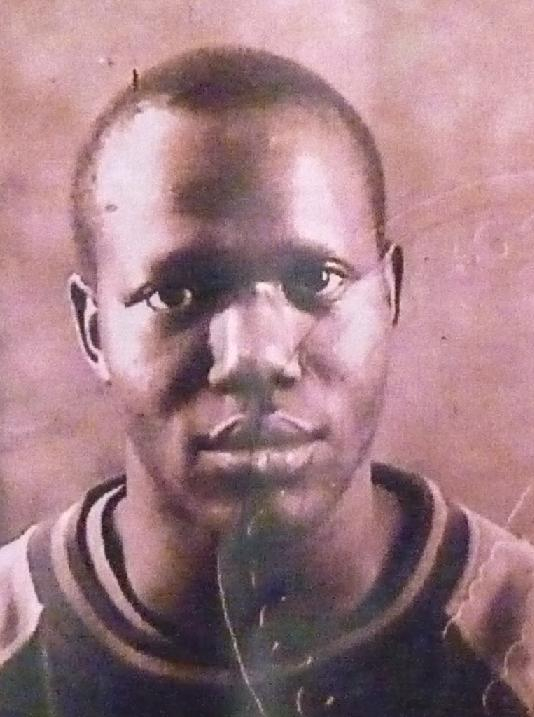
- Died: May 2010; Sidvwashini correctional facility, Swaziland
- Citizenship: Swaziland
- Occupations: Activist, trade unionist

Sipho Jele (died May 2010) was a Swazi activist and trade unionist. He was a member of the banned Swazi political party People's United Democratic Movement (Pudemo) as well as the Swaziland Agricultural and Plantations Workers Union (SAPWU), part of the Swaziland Federation of Trade Unions (SFTU). He died in police custody in Swaziland (now Eswatini), after having been arrested on 1 May 2010, at the SFTU May Day celebrations, for having worn a T-shirt with a Pudemo logo. Sipho Jele was found hanging from the rafters of a toilet at the Sidvwashini correctional facility where he was being held on 4 May.

== Murder case ==
Sipho Jele was a former employee at Swaziland's only pulp mill, and was studying engineering at the time of his death. He had been charged with high treason in a high-profile trial in 2006, accused of taking part in a bombing campaign, but was acquitted along with all the other accused.

According to Sipho Jele's aunt, who had previously worked as a nurse for 30 years and who saw the body, there were several indications that he had not committed suicide as claimed by the Swazi police, including a swollen face, blood having come out of his nostrils, and the fact that he hadn't soiled himself – as is commonly the case with those who have hanged themselves. The police officers in whose custody Jele was claimed they didn't kill him, although they admitted to have broken protocol on several accounts when arresting and detaining Jele.

The Swazi regime has been much criticised in relation to Jele's death especially by Swazi democracy organisations, foreign unions such as Cosatu, and South African, American and Danish newspapers and websites, as well as NGOs.

An independent investigation into the cause of the death was promised on 7 May by the Prime Minister of Swaziland. According to evidence given by Manzini-based police officers at this inquest, Sipho Jele was taken out of his cell to be interrogated for hours, although the evidence given by police officers and jailers was conflicting on several points. The director of public prosecutions, Mumcy Dlamini, testified at the same trial that Jele had told him he feared being "tubed", i.e. assaulted and suffocated, by police and therefore had asked Dlamini to be transferred to Sidvwashini.

== Funerals ==
Sipho Jele's funeral was disrupted by around 500 heavily armed police. The police destroyed several pictures of Jele, as well as removing a Pudemo flag from the coffin, and then arrested and detained several of the mourners. The funeral was subsequently called off by Jele's family for fear of further arrests. The funeral finally took place on 22 May, this time with a strict dress code banning any politically motivated attire or political speeches, although some of those attending disregarded this.
