= Swaziland National Ex-Mineworkers Association =

Organization

The Swaziland National Ex-Mine Workers Association (SNEMA) is an organisation of ex-miners, who at one point were employed in mines in South Africa. The organisation has over 700 members. Many of the members have sustained injuries or illness from working in the mines, and have been declared redundant. And many of the ex-mineworkers have not been compensated for these injuries or paid the pensions they are due.

SNEMA is not a political organisation as such, taking a more broad rights-based approach in support of Swaziland's poor, particularly in relation to procuring the unpaid compensation that they believe they are due from the mining industry. In doing this, SNEMA seeks to disseminate its message through mobilisation and civic education. SNEMA is a member of the Swaziland United Democratic Front.

SNEMA see the main problems in trying to procure their compensations as being:

- Lack of knowledge of rights amongst ex-mine workers.
- Lack of access to provident fund money.
- Lack of compensation to widows of ex-mine workers.
- Lack of care for sick and injured ex-mine workers, many of whom live in the rural areas of Swaziland where medical care facilities are rudimentary at best.
- Lack of support from the Swaziland government in accessing medical examinations to prove the illnesses, mainly tuberculosis and silicosis, or in helping addressing the above-mentioned problems.
- Lack of support from the South African government and South African mining industry in addressing the above-mentioned problems.
- Lack of support from other relevant bodies or organisations in addressing the above-mentioned problems.

SNEMA has successfully taken the Swazi Government to court over its unfulfilled promise to provide free primary school education (section 29 (6) of the constitution). The ex-miners argued that the persistent lack of education of their children at primary school level is a complete and unlawful violation of the constitution. The court case followed the refusal of government to respect the ruling of the High Court on the same issue on 16 March 2009, wherein it issued a declaratory judgement pronouncing that the Government of Swaziland has the responsibility to provide free primary school education across all grades in public primary schools in accordance with the Constitution.
