= Trade Union Congress of Eswatini =

Swazi trade union federation

TUCOSWA
- Trade Union Congress of Eswatini
- Founded: 2012
- Location: Eswatini
- Members: 35,000 (2013)
- Key people: Mduduzi Gina, acting General Secretary
- Affiliations: ITUC

The Trade Union Congress of Eswatini (TUCOSWA) is a Swazi trade union federation.

TUCOSWA was formed in January 2012 and in 2013 had 35,000 members. It was initially recognised and registered by the Eswatini government.

The Eswatini government chose to deregister TUCOSWA in April 2013, in violation of the rules of the International Labour Organization (ILO) (convention 87) that Eswatini has ratified. TUCOSWA is thus effectively an illegal organisation. Eswatini is therefore in effect without an overarching trade union federation, as the Swaziland Federation of Trade Unions and the Swaziland Federation of Labour that formed TUCOSWA disbanded their organisations upon the formation of TUCOSWA.

There have been several reports of police clamping down on TUCOSWA.

South African Trade Union Federation COSATU and Danish NGO Africa Contact started a campaign to lift the ban on TUCOSWA during July 2013.
