= Tanele Maseko =

Swazi human rights activist

Tanele Maseko is a Swazi human rights activist and the widow of the prominent human rights lawyer and democracy activist Thulani Maseko. Following her husband's assassination in 2023, Maseko has become a prominent campaigner both with regards to continuing her husband's activism promoting democratic reform in Eswatini, and also by calling for an independent investigation into his death, for which she has received harassment and intimidation from Swazi authorities.

== Personal life ==
Maseko was born in KaLuhleko, Bhunya, Manzini Region. Maseko married Thulani Maseko in 2008. They had two children together and lived in Luyengo, near Mbabane.

== Activism ==
Maseko's husband Thulani rose to prominence as a democracy activist, in addition to his work as a lawyer for minority and disadvantaged groups in Eswatini. Thulani had been imprisoned for contempt of court between 18 March 2014 and 30 July 2015 after writing an article in The Nation raising concerns about judicial independence and integrity in Eswatini. During her husband's imprisonment, Maseko wrote an article for Amnesty International about her experiences as the wife of a prisoner of conscience.

On 21 January 2023, Thulani was assassinated while watching television at home with Maseko and their two children by unknown individuals. Maseko's killing occurred hours after Mswati III, the King of Eswatini, made public comments warning human rights activists in the country not to "shed tears" about "mercenaries killing them". Maseko gained greater prominence following her husband's death, becoming the major face of the Justice for Thulani campaign. In July 2023, she stated that she had not received any updates from the police since the immediate aftermath of Thulani's killing, and accused the police of treating the investigation as a cold case.

Maseko established the Thulani Maseko Foundation to continue her husband's legacy, including campaigning for democratic reform in Eswatini and a transition away from absolute monarchy. Maseko also became the deputy director of the Southern Defenders, a regional human rights network in southern Africa. Maseko made public comments critical of Mswati III; in October 2023 during a talk with the Oslo Freedom Forum in Taipei, she criticised the President of Taiwan, Tsai Ing-wen, for making a state visit to Eswatini and maintaining diplomatic ties with the Swazi government despite its oppression of Swazi people.

=== Harassment campaign and arrest ===
In December 2023, while accepting a posthumous award for her husband at the Magnitsky Human Rights Awards in London, she accused Mswati III of being a dictator who had ordered the killing of her husband due to his human rights activism. Local independent media outlets in Eswatini reported that Maseko was being targeted and monitored by state authorities and that her life was potentially in danger. On 29 December 2023, a Swazi government spokesperson, Alpheous Nxumalo, released a statement on X dismissing the reports, while also making derogatory remarks about Maseko, including accusing her of being on "a global charade to cash in on her husband's death", of contaminating the crime scene immediately following Thulani's death, and of misrepresenting comments made by Mswati III concerning his stance on human rights activists. Nxumalo's comments were condemned by human rights organisations and activists including the Human Rights Foundation, the Southern Africa Human Rights Defenders Network, the Swaziland Multi-Stakeholder Forum and Maxwell Nkambule.

On 27 March 2024, Maseko and her children were stopped at the South Africa-Eswatini border between Oshoek and Ngwenya when attempting to cross back into Eswatini. Immigration officials reported that Maseko's passport had been flagged as belonging to a wanted person; local police officers subsequently confiscated Maseko's passport and phone, and interrogated her for four hours at the Manzini Regional Police Headquarters before releasing her pending a further interview to be held the following day in Mbabane. It was initially reported that Maseko's wanted status was linked to the investigation into her husband's death.

On 28 March, Maseko's interview with police officers in Mbabane was halted after her lawyers challenged the legality of the police's refusal to permit them to be present. During her time in the station, activists from the Swaziland Rural Women's Assembly protested outside against Maseko's arrest. As of 29 March 2024, the police have not released information about why Maseko was specifically identified as being a wanted person by Swazi authorities. Lydia Dlamini, the acting Eswatini Police National Commissioner, stated that Maseko needed to be interviewed due to her being the only witness to her husband's murder, and accused her of not co-operating with the police.

Regional and international human rights organisations including African Defenders, the Southern Africa Litigation Centre, the Centre for Human Rights at the University of Pretoria, Human Rights Watch, and Amnesty International condemned the targeting and detention of Maseko, and called on the Swazi government to focus on carrying out an independent and transparent investigation into Thulani Maseko's death. Human Rights Watch described the harassment of Maseko by Swazi authorities as an attempt to dissuade her from pursuing "justice and accountability" for her husband's murder, while Amnesty International accused the government of weaponizing the criminal justice system to target Maseko.
