= 10th BRICS summit =

2018 international summit in Johannesburg, South Africa

2018 BRICS summit 10th BRICS summit
- 25–27 July 2018
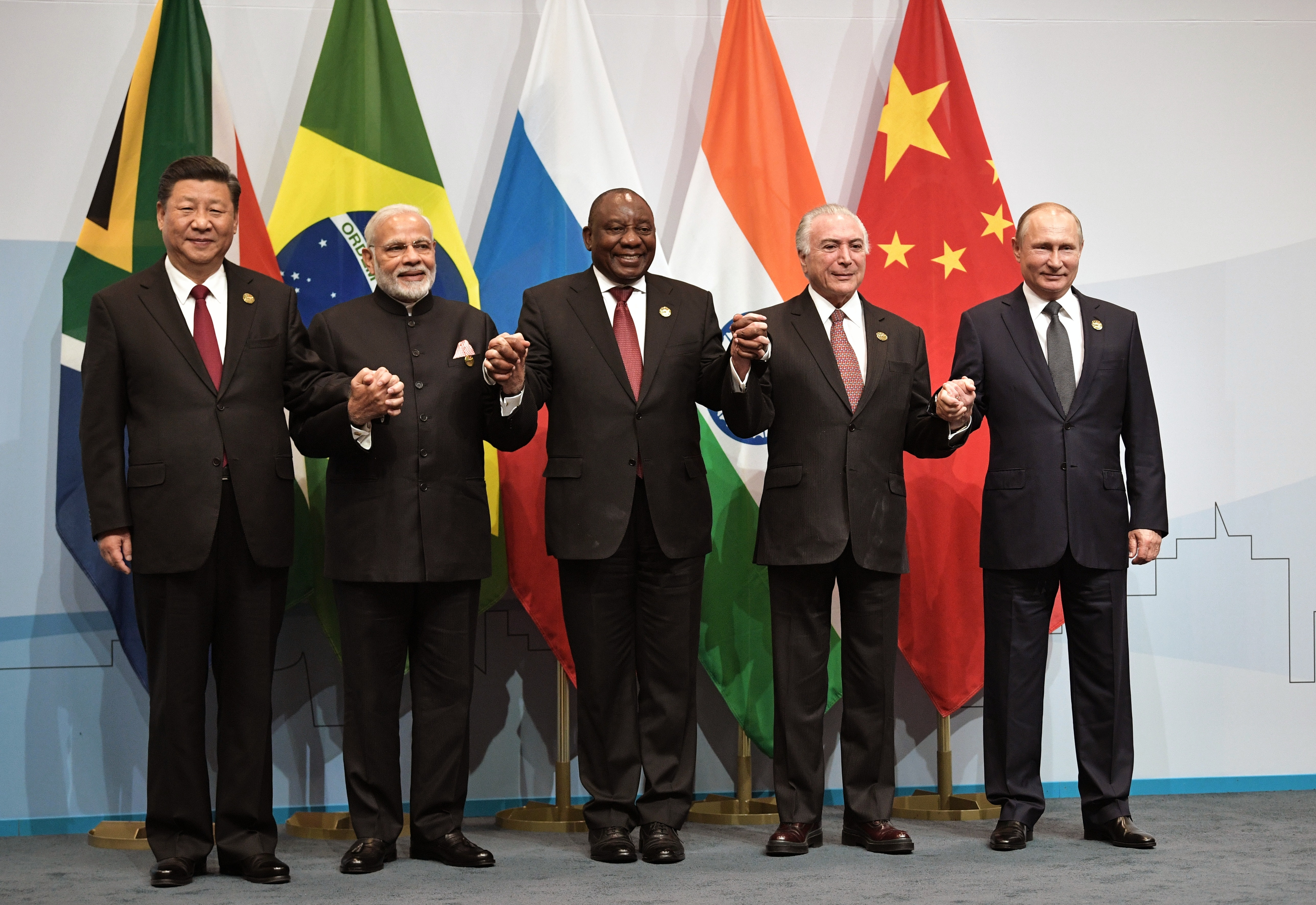
- Group photo of BRICS leaders, 2018
- Host country: South Africa
- Motto: Collaboration for Inclusive Growth and Shared Prosperity
- Cities: Johannesburg
- Venues: Sandton Convention Centre.
- Participants: Brazil; Russia; India; China; South Africa
- Chair: Cyril Ramaphosa, President of South Africa

The 2018 BRICS summit is the tenth annual BRICS summit, an international relations conference attended by the heads of state or heads of government of the five member states of BRICS at the time: Brazil, Russia, India, China and South Africa. The summit was held in Johannesburg, South Africa, the second time that South Africa has hosted the summit with the first being the 2013 summit.

Convened with the theme of "BRICS in Africa: Collaboration for Inclusive Growth and Shared Prosperity in the 4th Industrial Revolution", the next BRICS Summit set to take place in Brazil, have enjoyed the full support of the other member states along with its Chairship in 2019.

== Results ==
The three-day meeting of the 5 heads of state ended in key outcomes: Upholding commitment to the 2030 Sustainable Development Goals, the hosting of BRICS-Africa Outreach and the 2nd BRICS Plus Cooperation with Emerging Markets and Developing Countries (EMDCs), establishment of the BRICS Energy Research Cooperation Platform and BRICS Agricultural Research Platform, establishment of the BRICS Partnership on New Industrial Revolution (PartNIR), as well as a Working Group on Tourism.

== Participating leaders ==
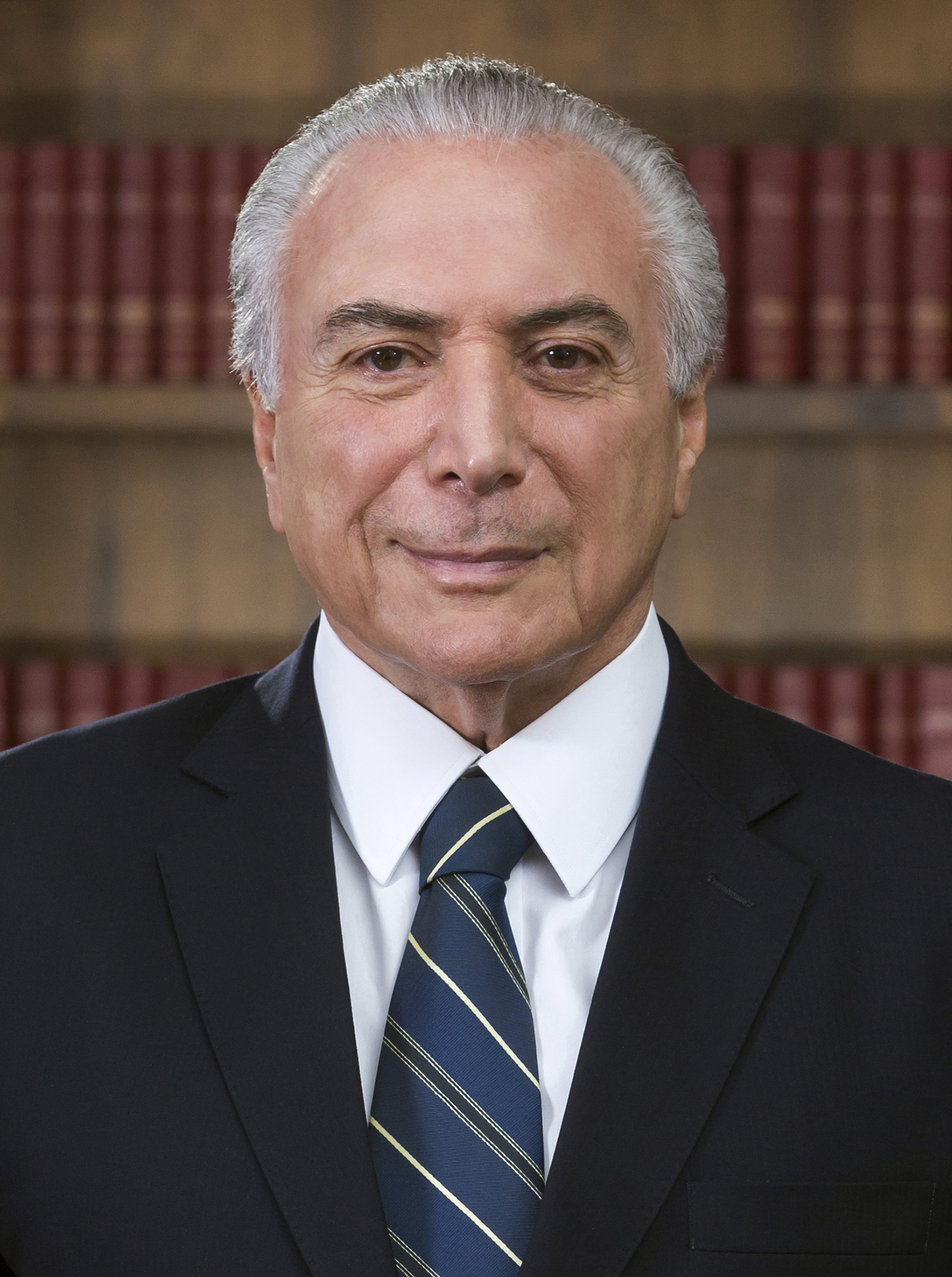
Brazil
Michel Temer, President

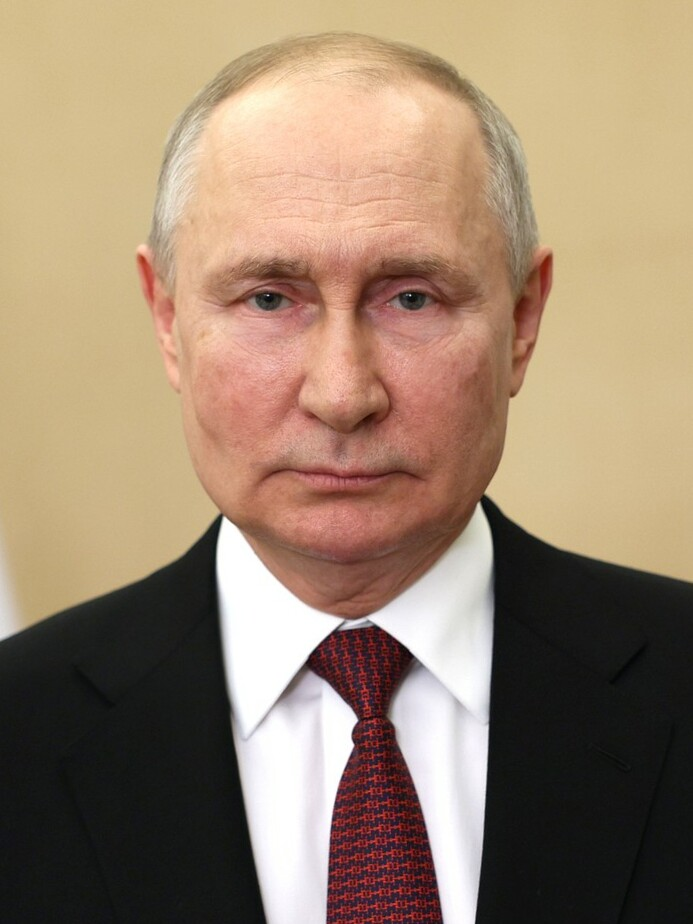
Russia
Vladimir Putin, President

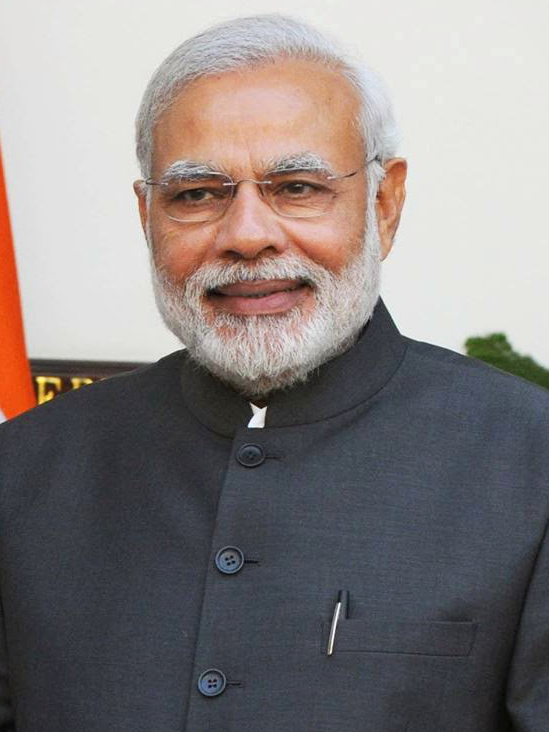
India
Narendra Modi, Prime Minister

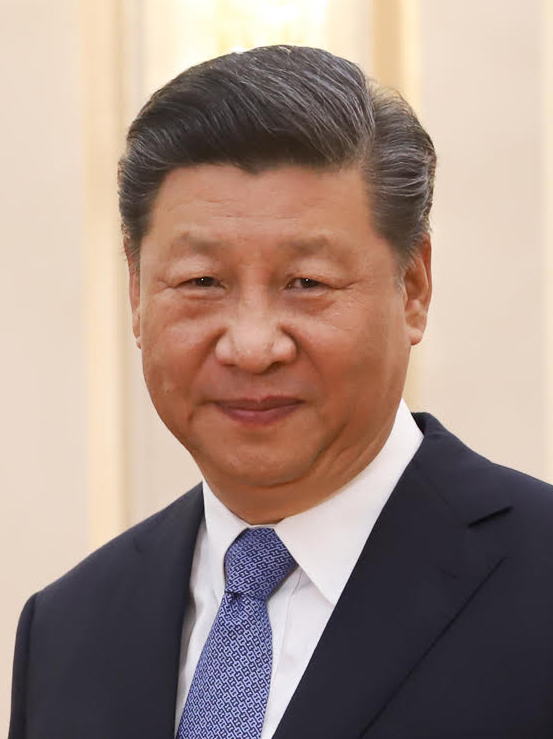
China
Xi Jinping, CCP General Secretary
President

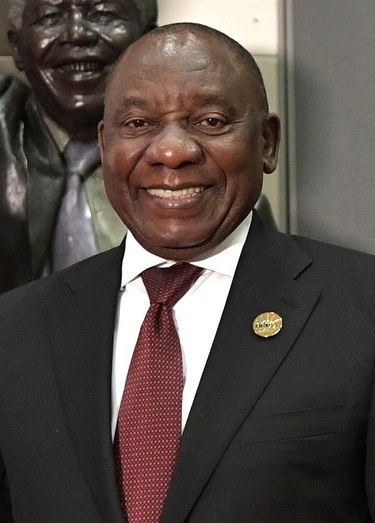
South Africa
Cyril Ramaphosa, President (Host)
