= Hosea, Eswatini =

Coordinates: 27.120°S 31.412°E

Hosea is an inkhundla of Eswatini, located in the Shiselweni District, with 19,608 people as of 2007. It houses seven chiefdoms, namely Bufaneni, Hhohho emuva, Ondiyaneni, Nsingizini, Lushini, Ludzakeni and Manyiseni under the headship of Chief Bhejisa Lushaba. The current member of parliament 2023-2028 is Sifiso Mabuza, brother to the incarcerated Mduduzi Bacede Mabuza. Mduduzi was arrested in July 2021 for supporting the pro democracy protests in Eswatini. Towards the end of September that year, students from Hosea high school, mobilized themselves for the release of their beloved MP. This led to the then, nationwide school protests from primary schools to tertiary levels, leading to the shut down of most schools across the country.
