= The Unthinkable (2021 film) =

- Theatrical release poster
- Directed by: Comfort Ndzinisa
- Written by: Comfort Ndzinisa
- Based on: 2021 Eswatini unrest
- Produced by: Comfort Ndzinisa; Manqoba Nxumalo; Vamile Matsebula; Mandla Dlamini; Saneliswa Magagula
- Starring: Gogo Mavuso; Madzabudzabu Kunene
- Narrated by: Tibusiso Mdluli
- Production company: Mzomba Production
- Distributed by: SABC; Swaziland News; YouTube
- Release dates: October 3, 2021 (Eswatini); October 5, 2021 (South Africa)
- Running time: 63 minutes
- Country: Eswatini
- Language: English

The Unthinkable is a documentary film directed by Comfort Ndzinisa, which provides a view of the civil strife in The Kingdom of Eswatini through a blend of in-person interviews with victims and survivors of the state crack-down on pro-democracy 2021 Eswatini protests and footage. The unrest follows the death of a Law student, Thabani Nkomonye allegedly in the hands of the police.

== Synopsis ==
The documentary provides an insight into those fateful days through eyes of those who have been most severely been affected by the 2021 Eswatini protest and unrest. The film begins with the event that sparked the civil strife in Eswatini, the untimely demise of university student, Thabani Nkomonye, allegedly at the hands of the Royal Eswatini Police in the middle of May 2021. Through a series of videos shared on various media platforms and news agencies, the film carefully frames a sequence of events leading up to the June 29, 2021 massacre before opening the door into its main chapter, the stories of the victims and survivors of the brutality of the armed forces, narrated in their own voices.

== Production ==
The idea for the documentary came at the height of the unrest, as claims circulated that armed forces were using excessive force on unarmed civilians. It was directed by Comfort Ndzinisa, which he also executively produced with Manqoba Nxumalo in Association with Eswatini Solidarity Fund, a relief organisation formed during the peak of the unrest. The filming of the documentary was done during field work of Eswatini Solidarity Fund, when they visited the survivors of the massacre to provide help and donations. Every part of the film production was done completely on a cellphone. As government continued to deny claims of abuse of power, Comfort Ndzinisa took it upon himself to document the events so history would never be forgotten.

== Release and reception ==
The Unthinkable documentary was released on October 3, 2021, via Swaziland News and YouTube. It has also been aired on one of the biggest investigative programmes in Africa, the ‘Cutting Edge’ on SABC 1 on a two part series. It was broadcast on October 5, 2021, and its second part on October 12, 2021. On YouTube, it recorded over thirty one thousand viewers in two days of upload. There was an outrage over the accounts of the survivors in the documentary which intensified the second wave of the unrest since the government was denying the use of live ammunition on unarmed civilians. Some of the comments shared YouTube could not be repeated however, most thanked the brains behind the documentary. Some were asking how they could assist the alleged victims through the Eswatini Solidarity Fund.

== Criticism ==
The documentary was heavily criticised for airing on foreign platforms instead of local. However, given that the documentary was released in the heart of the unrest, it was highly unlikely to have played on a local platform, given the human rights situation had deteriorated sharply. At least two of the survivors in the documentary were allegedly harassed by law enforcement for coming out about their ordeals.

== Accolades ==
The Unthinkable was selected for the 2022 edition of ECOCINE - INTERNATIONAL CINEMA FESTIVAL FOR ENVIRONMENTAL AND HUMAN RIGHTS. It was also played on SABC1 Cutting Edge on May 24, 2022, as a commemoration for May the African Month, a time when the continent of Africa commemorates the founding of the Organisation of African Unity (OAU). The documentary also won the 2022 Audience Choice Award category in Melbourne Lift-Off Global Network film festival.
