= Mario Masuku =

Swazi politician (1951–2021)

Founding President of the People's United Democratic Movement (PUDEMO)
- In office 6 July 1983 – 13 September 2018
- Preceded by: Position established
- Succeeded by: Mlungisi Makhanya

Personal details
- Born: Mario Thembeka Masuku; 9 October 1951 Makhosini, Nhlangano, Eswatini
- Died: 11 January 2021 (aged 69)
- Spouse: Thembi Mkhonta-Masuku
- Children: Mzwandile Masuku
- Occupation: Politician

Mario Thembeka Masuku (9 October 1951 – 11 January 2021) was a Swazi politician who was the leader of the People's United Democratic Movement (PUDEMO), Eswatini's banned opposition party.

== Early life and education ==
He was born on 9 October 1951, in the village of Makhosini, in Nhlangano, Eswatini. He was born into a poor family as the sixth of ten children. His father, Malcom, worked in the mines in Makhosini, and was also afterward a cowherd working in the Ministry of Agriculture in the Shiselweni Region. His mother, Fakazile, was a maid on farms from the Zwane clan, then a stay-at-home after the children's births. He attended Evelyn Baring High School. He was suspended multiple times during his education there for criticizing what he stated was racism by British teachers towards native Swazi teachers.

== Imprisonment for political activity ==
The Royal Swazi Police arrested and imprisoned Masuku at Matsapha maximum security prison on charges of sedition in 2001.

He was arrested again on November 15, 2008, under the Suppression of Terrorism Act of 2008. At the funeral of Musa Dlamini, who died while supposedly trying to bomb the Lozitha bridge, Masuku is alleged to have verbally supported recent bombings of government institutions. He was acquitted and discharged at the High Court on September 21, 2009 after spending 340 days in prison.

On 1 May 2014, Masuku, after a making a speech at a May day rally in Manzini, was arrested together with student activist Maxwell Dlamini. They were charged with terrorism and sedition. A widely supported international campaign for their release was started shortly thereafter.

He died on 11 January 2021, aged 69, from COVID-19.
