= Thulani Maseko =

Swaziland human rights lawyer (1970–2023)

- Maseko in 2011
- Born: Thulani Rudolf Maseko; 1 March 1970; Luhleko, Swaziland
- Died: 21 January 2023 (aged 52); Luhleko, Eswatini
- Education: University of Swaziland (B.A., LL.B)
- Occupation: Lawyer
- Years active: 1994–2023
- Spouse: Tanele Maseko

Thulani Rudolf Maseko (1 March 1970 – 21 January 2023) was a Swazi human rights lawyer who previously served as the Secretary General of the People's United Democratic Movement (PUDEMO). He was imprisoned from 2014 to 2015, and declared a prisoner of conscience by Amnesty International. He launched a court challenge to King Mswati III of Eswatini in 2018 and was assassinated in 2023.

== Early life and education ==
Maseko was born in Luhleko, near Bhunya in Swaziland's Manzini Region on 1 March 1970. He attended the University of Swaziland, graduating with a Bachelor of Arts in Law in 1994 and a Bachelor of Laws in 1997. In 2011, he earned a Master in International Legal Studies from the American University's Washington College of Law.

== Activism and imprisonment ==
Maseko was a democracy advocate, and a human rights lawyer noted for his efforts to protect minority groups and people who had been evicted from their homes. In 2009, he represented the Swaziland National Ex-Miners Workers Group in their successful case against the government for failing to uphold the provisions of the Constitution that all Swazi children would receive free primary education within three years of it being implemented.

On 18 March 2014, Maseko was jailed for contempt of court after criticising Swaziland's judicial system. In April 2014, People's United Democratic Movement General Secretary Mlungisi Makhanya was arrested for wearing a party T-shirt to protest the incarceration of Maseko and journalist Bheki Makhubu.

In August 2014, Maseko wrote to United States President Barack Obama from prison, seeking his intervention ahead of the 2014 United States–Africa Leaders Summit. Maseko was released from prison on 30 July 2015. He had been declared a prisoner of conscience by Amnesty International.

In 2018, Maseko launched a court challenge against Mswati III's change of the country's name from Swaziland to Eswatini.

== Death ==
Maseko was assassinated in his own living room, in front of his family on 21 January 2023 in Luhleko. This followed intensified efforts to silence pro-democracy and human rights advocates in Eswatini. Speaking earlier on the day of the assassination, King Mswati III said, publicly, that "People should not shed tears and complain about mercenaries killing them. These people started the violence first".

Maseko was buried on 29 January 2023.

=== Reactions ===
After Maseko's death, Zimbabwean journalist Hopewell Chin'ono tweeted that the assassination was "a chilling reminder of how the corrupt political elites are prepared to do anything to shut down pro-democracy voices". Numerous human rights organisations, as well as the National Union of Metalworkers of South Africa, the South African Federation of Trade Unions, the Law Society of South Africa, the United Nations, and many other organisations, condemned the assassination.

The government of Eswatini released a statement saying that "Maseko's demise is a loss to the Nation and his footprints as a human rights lawyer are there as proof of his contribution to the country" and said that an investigation would be carried out to bring his killers to justice.

Pudemo president Mlungisi Makhanya said that "There is absolutely no doubt that the assassination was carried out at the King's order ...Thulani's assassination by King Mswati represents one thing and one thing only – the assassination of peace. Comrade Thulani was a man of peace. He was a principled leader who gave his all in the fight for human rights and democracy, but always employed peaceful methods."

On 23 January 2023, Amnesty International's Deputy Director for East and Southern Africa, Flavia Mwangovya, said that Maseko's murder was "a chilling reminder" that those who call for political reform in Eswatini were not safe. Amnesty demanded "an effective thorough, impartial and transparent" investigation into Maseko’s murder to ensure his killers were brought to justice. The organization said the investigation should be conducted by an agency independent of the government.

Following his death, Maseko's wife, Tanele Maseko, has led a campaign calling for an independent investigation into his death.

== See also ==
- Human rights in Eswatini
- Government of Eswatini
