= Swaziland Federation of Labour =

The Swaziland Federation of Labour (SFL) was created in 1994 as a break-away union from the Swaziland Federation of Trade Unions. It has 12 affiliates covering manufacturing, retail, finance, IT, media and non-teaching staff, amongst other things. Originally established with 5,000 members, the membership of the organisation has increased to 20,000. The federation has no full-time officials and relies on the full-time officers in its affiliated unions. The SFL also operates from affiliated unions' offices and has little finance of its own.

== Key People ==
- Vincent Ncongwane
