= African United Democratic Party =

Eswatini political party

- Abbreviation: AUDP
- President: Stanley S. Malindzisa
- Secretary-General: Sibusiso B. Dlamini
- Founded: October 2005
- Headquarters: Manzini, Eswatini
- Ideology: Liberalism; Social liberalism
- Political position: Centre
- Continental affiliation: African Democratic Alliance for Freedom and Progress
- Colours: red, blue, green, white, yellow and black
- Slogan: Advancing Liberalism in Swaziland

Website
- http://audp.org

The African United Democratic Party is a political party in Eswatini. The party supports social-liberal principles, and is in favor of replacing the country's absolute monarchy with a Prime Minister acting as head of government, while the monarch remains as a traditional figurehead and head of state.
