= Coalition of Informal Economy Association of Swaziland =

The Coalition of Informal Economy Association of Swaziland (CIEAS) was formed in 2006 by marginalized community-based organizations (CBOs) striving to earn a living by carrying out different income-generation projects. CIEAS has a membership of 12,600 which is dominated by a 60% number of women. CIEAS has established branches in all four regions of Swaziland.

CIEAS has a democratically elected leadership. The organization seeks to bring together all informal traders in Swaziland.
