= Unthinkable: An Extraordinary Journey Through the World's Strangest Brains =

2018 nonfiction book by Helen Thomson

- Author: Helen Thomson
- Language: English
- Subject: Neuroscience; popular science
- Publisher: Ecco Press
- Publication date: 26 Jun 2018
- ISBN: 978-0-06-239116-2

Unthinkable: An Extraordinary Journey Through the World's Strangest Brains is a 2018 nonfiction book by Helen Thomson. In the book, Thomson interviews people with unusual neurologic conditions such as synesthesia and schizophrenia.

== Synopsis ==
In her introduction, Thomson reviews the basic history of neurology and the anatomy of the brain. She then describes her desire to explore neurological disorders through the lens of human experience.

Thomson interviews a man named Bob who experiences HSAM. She discusses the meaning of memory and what it would be like to live with perfect autobiographical recall. She then interviews Sharon, a woman who lives with developmental topographical disorientation. Sharon is unable to form a mental map, causing her to often feel lost and disoriented even inside her own home. Thomson explores the way in which navigating our environment is integral to the human experience.

Thomson interviews Rubén Díaz Caviedes, a man living with synesthesia. Rubén's condition causes him to see auras surrounding people; the colors vary based on how he feels about them. Rubén is red-green colorblind. Despite this, he is able to “see” multiple shades within his mind that he cannot perceive with his eyes. Thomson discusses the concept of various types of synesthesia and how our senses are interconnected. She also discusses the concept of qualia.

Thomson interviews Tommy McHugh, a man whose personality changed drastically after a subarachnoid hemorrhage due to a brain aneurysm. Tommy previously had a history of domestic violence and criminal activity, but had significantly improved mood and sociability after his brain injury. Thomson also discusses twin studies and the idea that human personalities are influenced by genetic and environmental factors. She also debunks the popular “left and right brain” theory of personality, finding that Stephen Kosslyn’s theory of “top brain” and “bottom brain” better aligns with current data.

Sylvia is a retired math teacher who experiences permanent auditory hallucinations: she constantly hears music after losing her sense of hearing to an ear infection. Thomson recounts her own grandmother's experience with Charles Bonnet syndrome as well as the ganzfeld effect, which causes human brains to hallucinate during sensory deprivation.

Thomson discusses the historical belief in lycanthropy. She meets with Matar, a ma who has been diagnosed with schizophrenia and has experienced the belief that he has been transformed into a tiger. She debunks the myth that mental illness is highly correlated with violence; in fact, most violent crime is not related to mental illness. Thomson then discusses the concept of the sense of self through an interview with Louise, who experiences depersonalization. She uses Louise's experiences to examine the way in which our sense of our own body (interoception) plays a role in our emotions and our interactions with the external world. She also interviews Graham, a British man who suffered from Cotard syndrome after a suicide attempt. Graham sincerely held the belief that his brain had died and that he no longer existed.

Finally, Thomson interviews a physician with mirror-touch synesthesia, a condition in which mirror neurons are overly active. Thomson relates this case to the concept of emotional contagion, which affects non-synesthetes as well. Thomson discusses the case of the Jumping Frenchmen of Maine, which inspired her to write the book. She interviewed Basse Anderson, a Norwegian man with a heightened startle reflex who might have a modern-day iteration of this syndrome. She concludes by remarking upon her desire to embrace the subjectivity of interviewing individual people rather than focusing purely on objective scientific studies.

== Reception ==
Dylan Evans of the Evening Standard uses the phenomenon of the dress to illustrate the way in which humans perceive the world differently; Evans states that "In Unthinkable, the science writer Helen Thomson gives us a taste of just how extreme these differences can get." This review also compares Unthinkable to the classic work The Man Who Mistook His Wife for a Hat by neurologist Oliver Sacks.

Mark Honigsbaum of The Guardian wrote a joint review for Unthinkable and Brainstorm: Detective Stories from the World of Neurology by Suzanne O'Sullivan. O'Sullivan is a physician, while Thomson is not. Honigsbaum has the following to say regarding Thomson's approach to her interview subjects:

[Thomson] not being a neurologist, she cannot bring us diverting tales from the bedside. Instead, Thomson makes a virtue of her limitations by travelling the world in search of “strange brains” in an effort to understand them as a “friend might”. It is, for the most part, a successful strategy and although I did not fully buy her claims to have entered her subjects’ peculiar sensory universes, by the end of her journey she had certainly persuaded me to see the world differently.

In a review for Chemistry World, Jamie Durrani stated that the book is "tremendously well written, and for such a heavy topic it is a surprisingly light read." A review for Kirkus called the book a "user-friendly tour of the brain and the curious things that go on inside of it" as well as "pleasing and accessible".

A review in the Washington Post called the book "an engaging tour inside the head" and praised the combination of interviews, neuroscientific overviews, and direct addresses to the reader. The same review notes that Thomson "occasionally stumbles, with interviews that feel closer to speed dating than fully fleshed profiles"; however, the review ultimately concluded favorably. A review by James McConnachie of The Times also compares Unthinkable to the work of Oliver Sacks, writing that Thomson "tries to step out of [Sacks's] shadow by discharging the subject from hospital." McConnachie criticized Thomson's prose and ultimately reviewed the work unfavorably, stating that "by divorcing these fascinating conditions from the clinical environment, Thomas does not bring them to life but loses the very thing that made Sacks so thrilling to read."
