= 11th BRICS summit =

2019 international summit in Brasília, Brazil

2019 BRICS summit 11th BRICS summit
- 13–14 November 2019
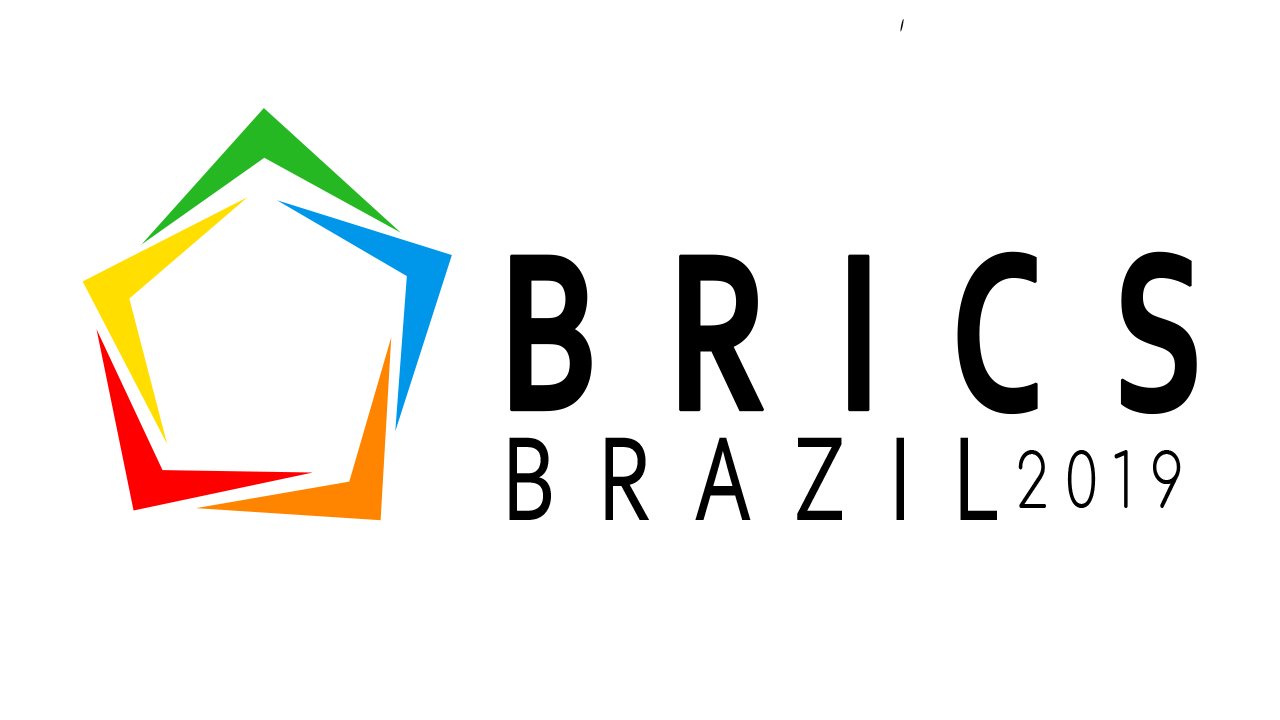

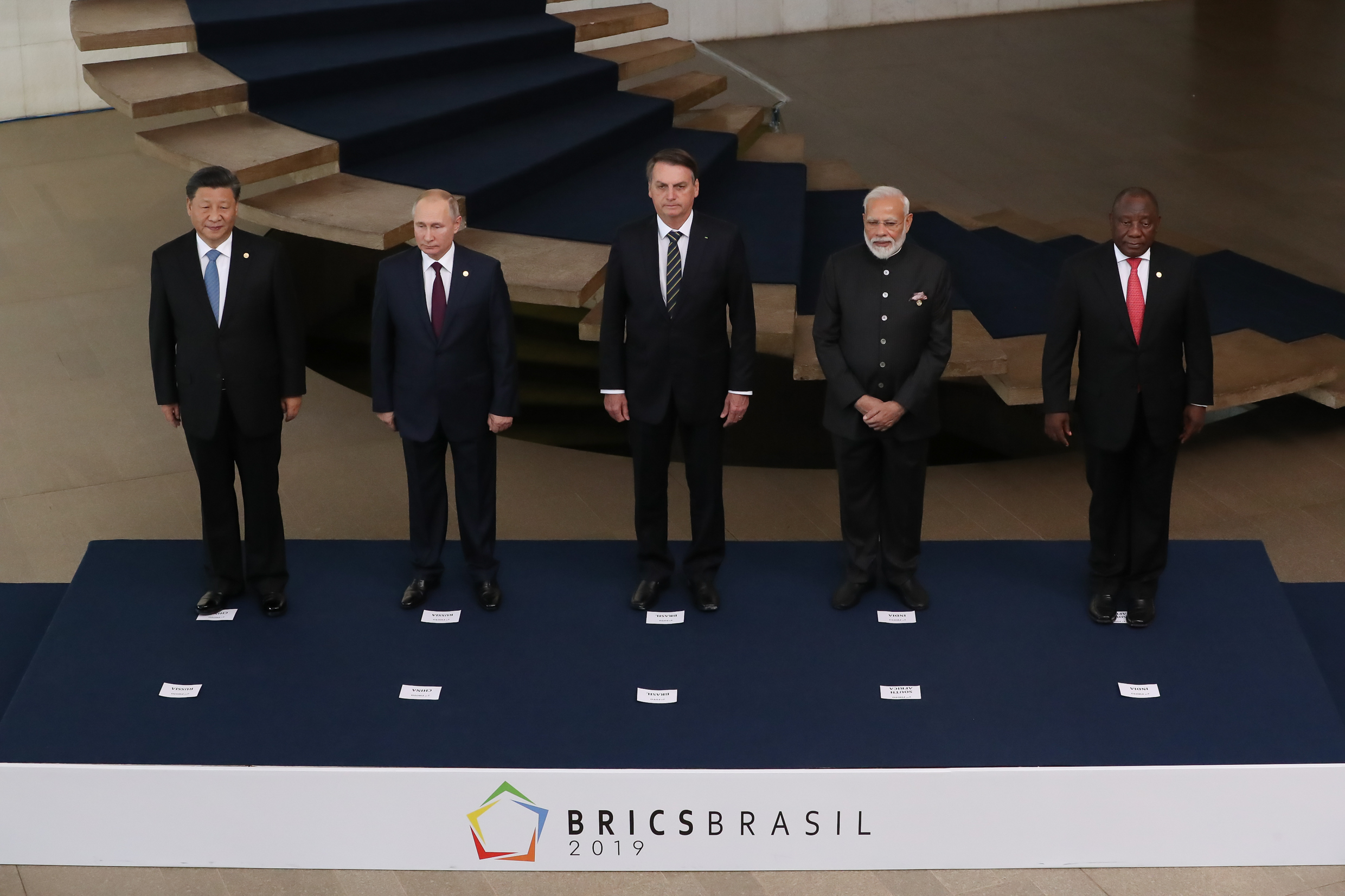
- Host country: Brazil
- Motto: Economic growth for an innovative future
- Cities: Brasília
- Venues: Itamaraty Palace
- Participants: Brazil; Russia; India; China; South Africa
- Chair: Jair Bolsonaro, President of Brazil

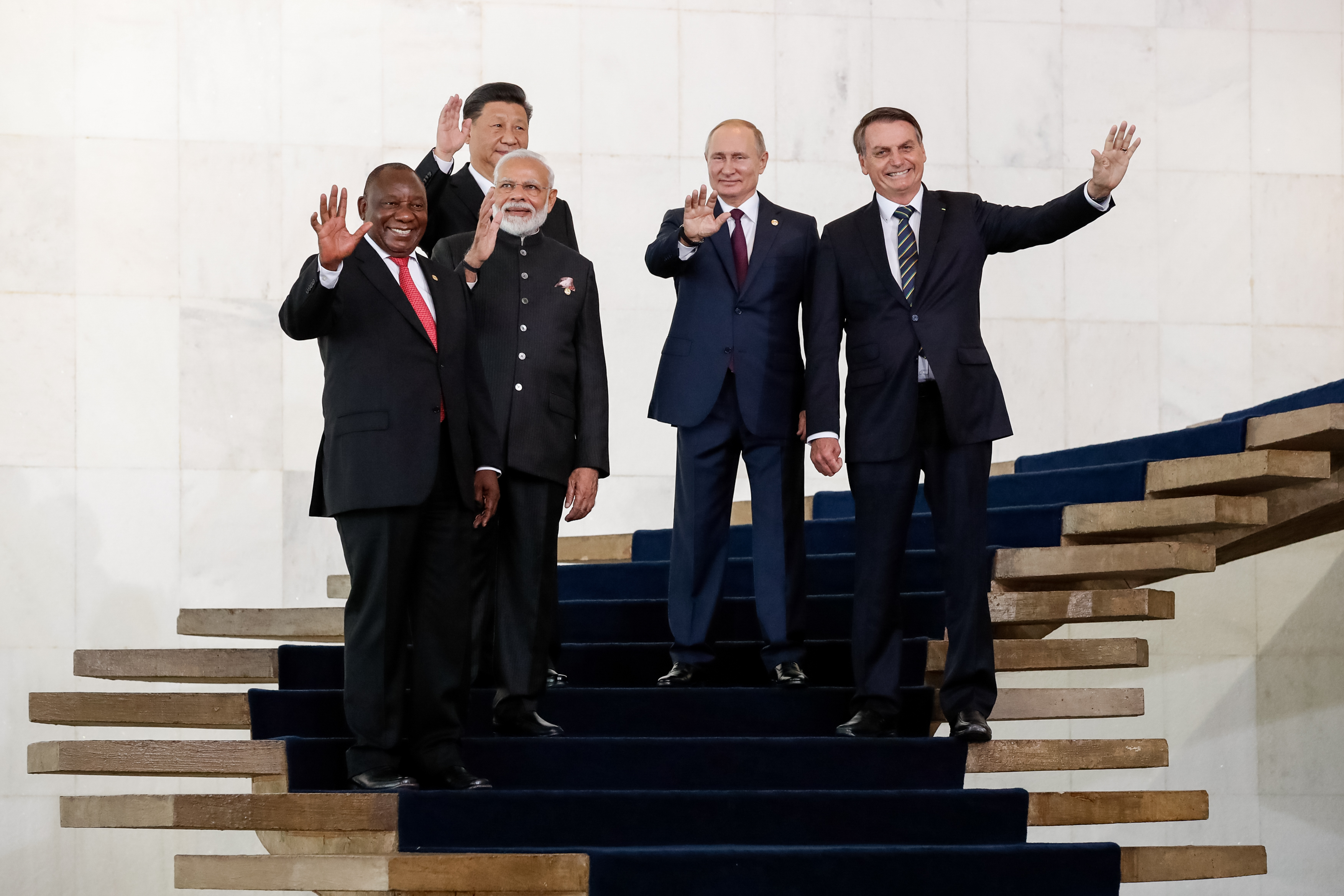
Group photo of BRICS leaders

The 2019 BRICS summit was the eleventh annual BRICS summit, an international relations conference to be attended by the heads of state or heads of government of the five member states Brazil, Russia, India, China and South Africa. The meeting was held at the Itamaraty Palace, where the Brazilian Ministry of Foreign Affairs is located. The Brazilian capital hosted the BRICS summit for the second time. The Sherpa meeting was held in the Brazilian city of Curitiba between March 14 and 15.

== Theme and priorities ==
The name of the chosen theme was: BRICS: economic growth for an innovative future.

The following topics were discussed: strengthening of the cooperation in science, technology and innovation, enhancement of the cooperation on digital economy, invigoration of the cooperation on the fight against transnational crime, especially against organized crime, money laundering, and drug trafficking, and encouragement to the rapprochement between the New Development Bank (NDB) and the BRICS Business Council.

An official joint declaration of the participating countries stated that "we reaffirm our fundamental commitment to the principle of sovereignty, mutual respect and equality and to the shared goal of building a peaceful, stable and prosperous world."

== Participating leaders ==
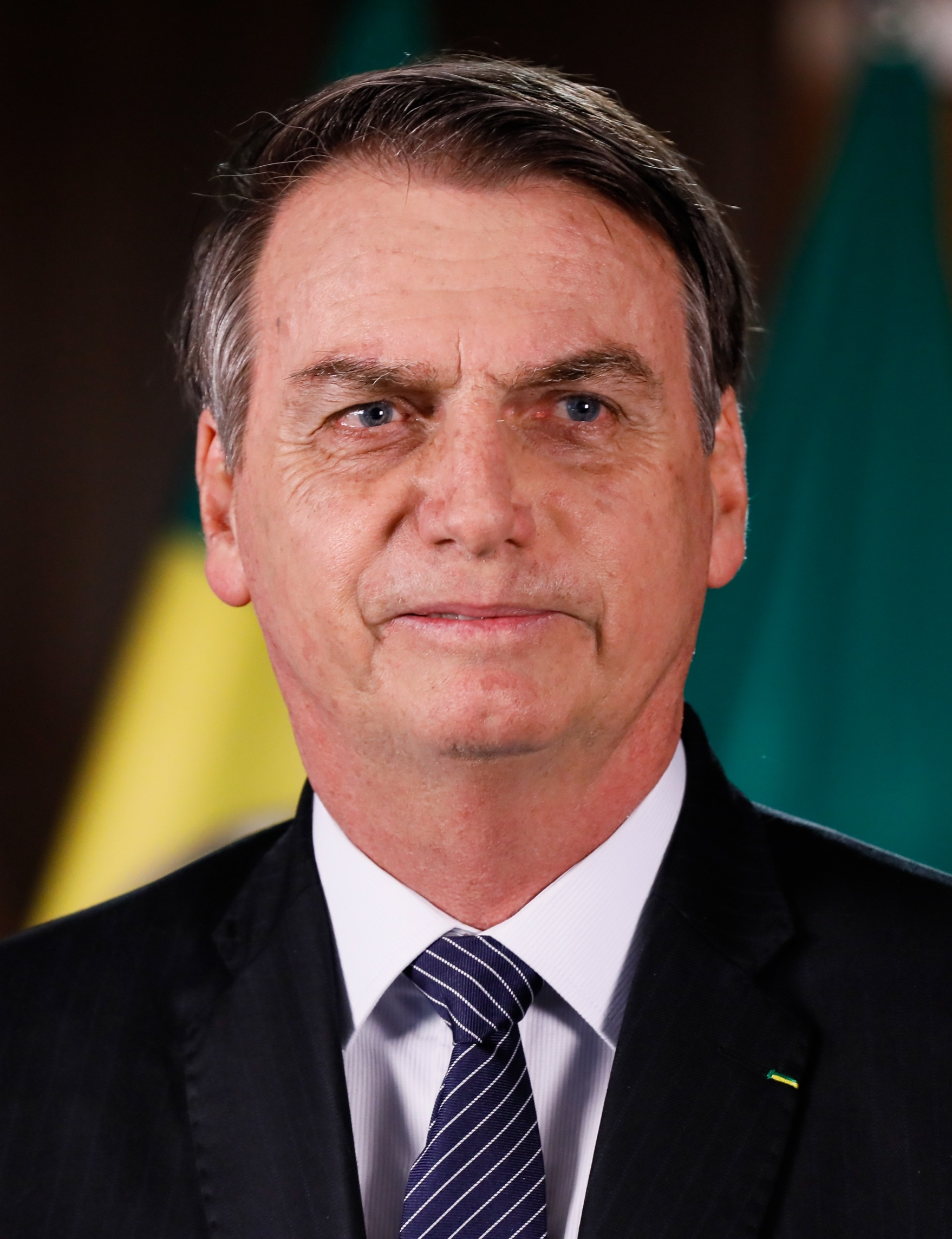
Brazil
Jair Bolsonaro, President (Host)

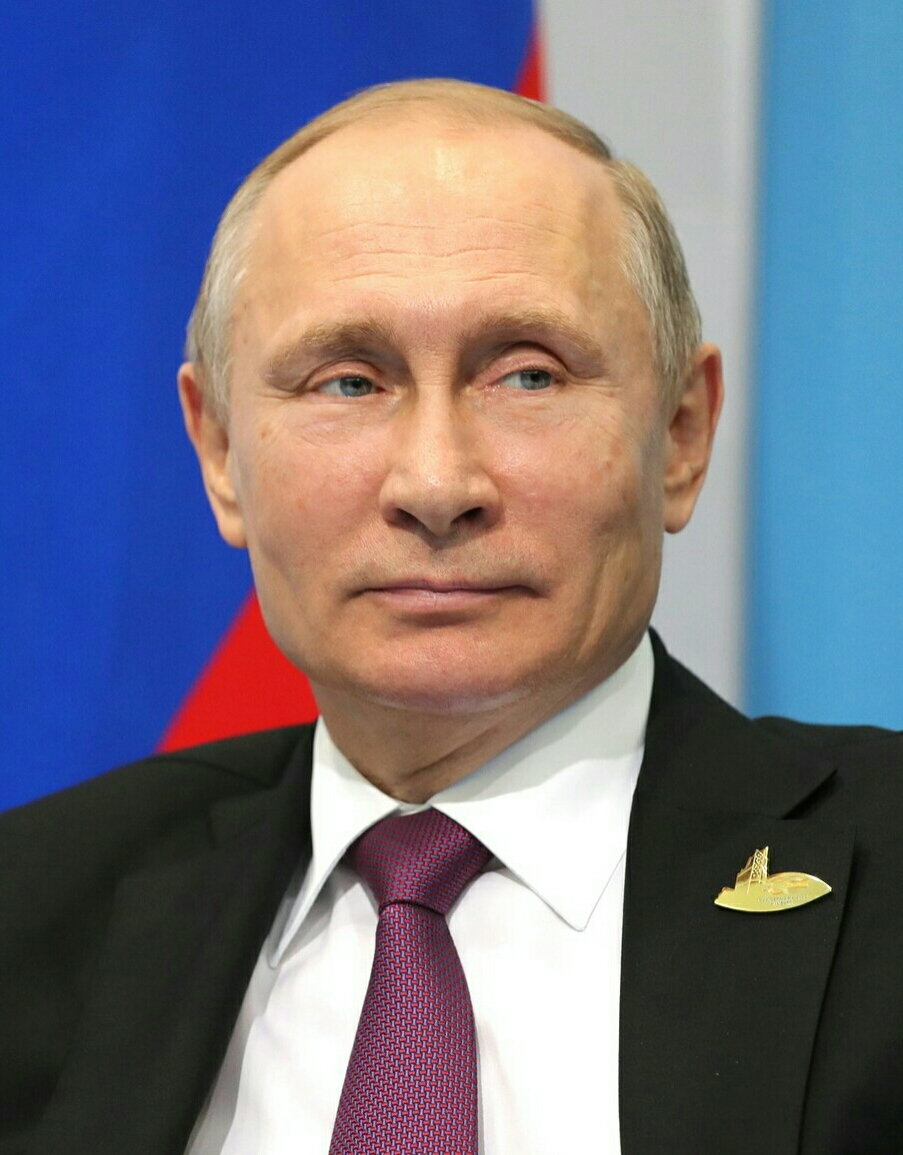
Russia
Vladimir Putin, President

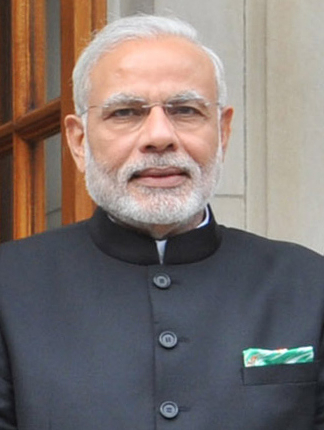
India
Narendra Modi, Prime Minister

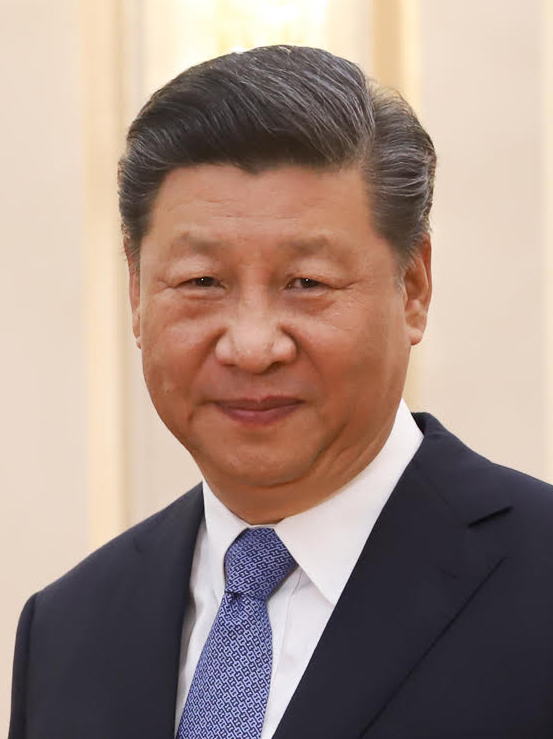
China
Xi Jinping, CCP General Secretary
President

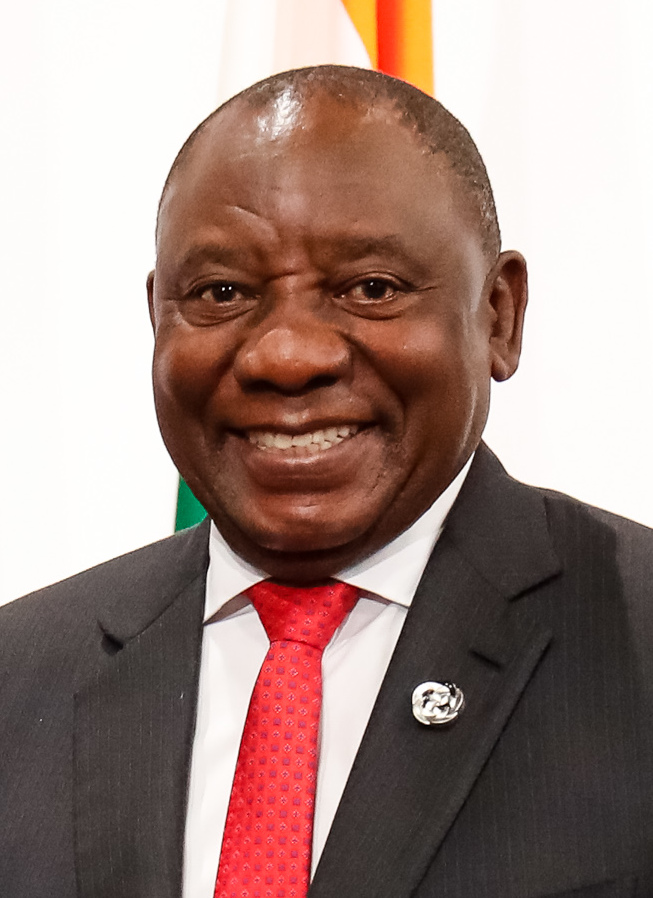
South Africa
Cyril Ramaphosa, President
