= People's United Democratic Movement =

Political party in Eswatini

People's United Democratic Movement Insika Yenkhululeko Yemaswati
- Abbreviation: PUDEMO
- President: Mlungisi Makhanya
- Secretary-General: Penuel Malinga
- Founded: 7 July 1983
- Youth wing: Swaziland Youth Congress
- Ideology: Democratic socialism
- Political position: Left-wing
- International affiliation: Progressive Alliance; Socialist International (consultative)
- Colours: Green, Orange, Red and Black

Party flag

Website
- www.pudemo.net

The People's United Democratic Movement (PUDEMO; Swazi: Insika Yenkhululeko Yemaswati) is the largest opposition party in Eswatini. It is a democratic socialist party. Formed in 1983 at the University of Eswatini, it is led by Mlungisi Makhanya.

The absolute monarchy of Mswati III, the ruler of Eswatini, has repressed PUDEMO by jailing its leaders and banning the party by claiming that it is a terrorist organization. The Swazi government has been monitoring PUDEMO closely since it launched the Ulibambe Lingashoni ("Don't Let the Sun Set") campaign, which aims for a "total liberation" of Eswatini, and has recently cracked down heavily on even small manifestations of support for PUDEMO, such as the death in custody of PUDEMO member Sipho Jele, who was arrested for wearing a PUDEMO t-shirt in May 2010.

== History ==
The People's United Democratic Movement was formed in 1983 at the University of Eswatini.

Its 1985 manifesto stated that it was

"fully dedicated to creating a democratic Swaziland", that "the countries wealth shall be enjoyed by all citizens and shall be shared equally", that "the land shall be given to all those who work it", that there shall be "free, compulsory, universal and equal [education] for all children" and that "human rights shall be observed and respected".

PUDEMO called for democratic reforms in 1988, 1990, and 1991. PUDEMO rejected King Mswati III's 1991 commission to review the tiNkhundla system, and the King's 1992 commission on electoral reform. King Mswati III responded by suspending the legislature, and began to rule by decree.

The Swaziland Youth Congress claimed responsibility for a 6 February 1995 fire in the House of Assembly.

PUDEMO held a campaign of strikes and civil disobedience in 1996.

In 2000, PUDEMO President Mario Masuku was arrested for "insulting the king, sedition and treason."

Pro-democracy protests took place in Eswatini in 2002, with "40% of Eswatini population believed to be on verge of starvation following poor harvests."

At the 2003 elections in Eswatini only non-partisans were elected. In March 2005, the Eswatini High Court ruled that "political parties can not exist."

In March 2006, PUDEMO members, including Bonginkosi Dlamini, the PUDEMO secretary-general, were charged with petrol bomb attacks. In April 2007, "Six PUDEMO members [were] charged with sedition following protests on the anniversary of King Sobhuza II's royal decree banning political parties."

In April 2008, PUDEMO's deputy President Gabriel Mkhumane was killed by criminals, according to the Swazi government. However, opposition supporters believe that he was assassinated by government operatives.

The Umbane People's Liberation Army, described as "a secret militant group" linked to PUDEMO, claimed responsibility for a series of small bomb blasts in Eswatini in 2008.

On 21 September 2008, Musa Dlamini and Jack Govender were killed while allegedly trying to bomb the Lozitha Bridge in an attempt to assassinate the King. Although PUDEMO had "called for a more militant approach to achieving democracy ... [it] denied any part in the bombing. However, at Musa Dlamini's funeral, PUDEMO President Mario Masuku was alleged to have verbally supported recent bombings of government institutions. Mario Masuku spent 340 days in prison before he was acquitted and discharged at the High Court on 21 September 2009.

In May 2010, Sipho Jele, a PUDEMO member, was arrested for wearing a PUDEMO t-shirt, and later died in police custody.

The Bhunya home of Alex LaNgwenya, a leader of PUDEMO's youth wing, the Swaziland Youth Congress (SWAYOCO), was destroyed in a bombing attack in 2010. "The Suppression of Terrorism Act of 2008 was enacted soon after the incident, and PUDEMO and SWAYOCO were banned as terrorist organizations. Several members of PUDEMO and SWAYOCO were alleged to have carried out a bombing campaign and detained."

PUDEMO's Deputy-President Sikhumbuzo Phakathi said the 2010 Swaziland Democracy Campaign "was launched in South Africa because in Swaziland all political activity is banned," adding:

"That makes it a criminal offense to belong to a political party," said Phakathi. "It makes it recently a terrorist act to belong to my organization, PUDEMO, which the government decided was a terrorist organization."

From 2010 to 2011, attempts to add the history of PUDEMO to Eswatini's high school curriculum failed.

In 2012, the Umbane People's Liberation Army participant Amos Mbedzi of South Africa was sentenced to "85 years in prison for high treason and terrorism" for his part in the 2008 bombing at Lozitha bridge.

Also in 2012, Princess Sikhanyiso Dlamini held a political debate with PUDEMO over Twitter, while her father, King Mswati III, continued his refusal to negotiate with PUDEMO on the grounds that they were terrorists.

PUDEMO was admitted into the Socialist International as a consultative member at the SI's spring congress on 4–5 February 2013.

In 2014, PUDEMO President Mario Masuku and Swaziland Youth Congress leader Maxwell Dlamini were arrested during Labour Day celebrations.

In April 2014 PUDEMO General Secretary Mlungisi Makhanya was arrested for wearing a party t-shirt, and released on bail. Makhanya was wearing the t-shirt to protest the incarceration of journalist Bheki Makhubu and human rights lawyer Thulani Maseko. According to IFEX, Maseko is alleged to have said: "MJ Dlamini and Jack Govender died for the liberation of this country. One day the Lozitha bridge will be called MJ and Govender bridge."

On 23 January 2023 Thulani Maseko, a human rights lawyer and former secretary general of the party was assassinated.

== Organization ==
- The Swaziland Youth Congress (SWAYOCO) is PUDEMO's youth wing.
- The Umbane People's Liberation Army has been described as "a secret militant group linked to the People’s United Democratic Movement (PUDEMO)".
- PUDEMO became a consultative member of the Socialist International in February 2013.
- The Danish Red-Green Alliance began a partnership with PUDEMO in March 2013 which "aims to increase the capacity of PUDEMO to be a more visible and credible political force within and outside Swaziland."
- Solidarity organizations include the Swaziland Solidarity Network, based in South Africa, which has stated its "unwavering commitment to total liberation of the people of Swaziland from the unjust and undemocratic system and the autocracy of the royal family that continues to plunder the national economy and abuse cultural and political institutions", and the Swaziland Solidarity Network Canada.

== Notable people ==
- Mario Masuku, founder and former President
- Thulani Maseko, human rights activist and lawyer
- Wonder Mkhonza, politician
