= Maxwell Dlamini =

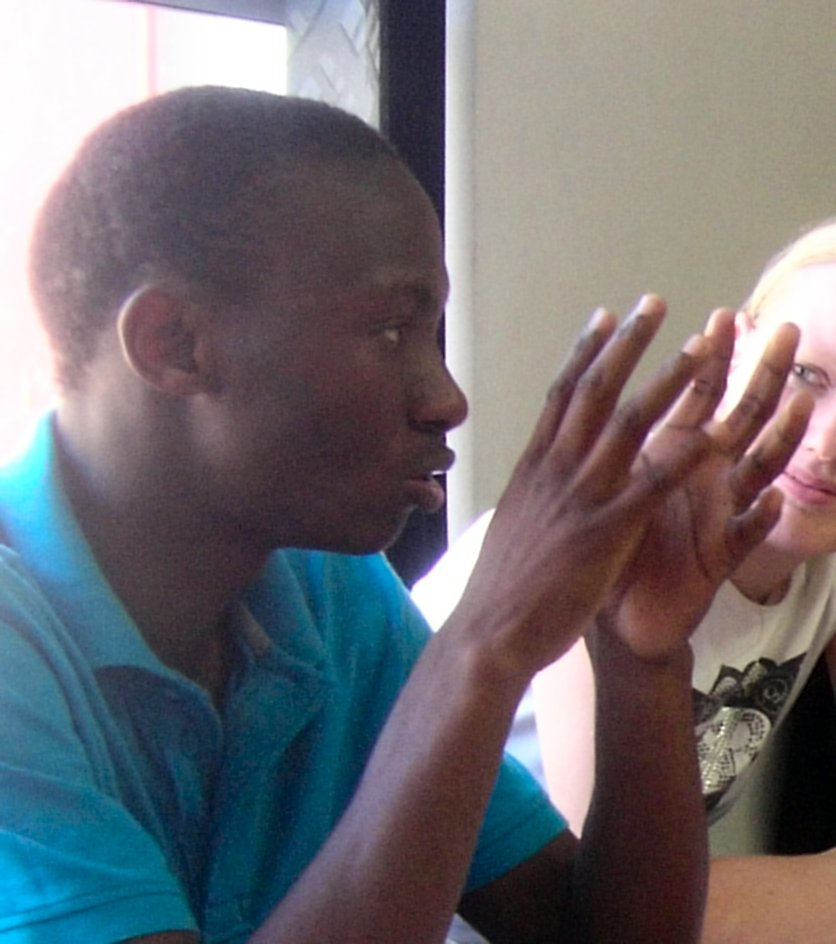
Maxwell Dlamini

Maxwell Dlamini is the Secretary General of SWAYOCO and the former President of the University of Swaziland's Students Representative Council. During the so-called "April 12 Swazi Uprising" in April 2011, he and fellow activist Musa Ngubeni were arrested on charges of possession of explosives under Sections 8 and 9 of Swaziland's Explosives Act 4 of 1961. They were both allegedly tortured and were subsequently refused bail. They were imprisoned at the Manzini Remand Centre.

An international campaign for their release was initiated by Danish NGO Africa Contact, British NGO ACTSA, and the British National Union of Students.

Maxwell Dlamini was nominated for the 2013 Student Peace Prize in November 2011, and the 2012 Frontline Defenders Award for Human Rights Defenders at Risk in January 2012. In 2013, he received the All-Africa Students' Union's 2013 Student Activist Award, for ”the role he has played in Swazi and African students' movements.”

Maxwell Dlamini and Musa Ngubeni were granted bail on 20 December 2011. Bail was set at 50 000 Rand, by far the highest bail ever in the history of Swazi law.

Maxwell Dlamini was released on bail on 3 February 2011. The bail money was collected by his father, Nimrod Dlamini, and local and international solidarity movements.

Maxwell Dlamini was arrested on 23 April 2013 in connection with a SWAYOCO rally which was held on 19 April in Mbabane. Maxwell was charged with two counts of sedition.

He was released on bail for a second time on 5 June 2013, but re-arrested on 1 May 2014, allegedly for criticising Swaziland's government and king in a speech.

Maxwell Dlamini was acquitted of the 2011 charges of contravening Swaziland’s Explosives Act on 4 September 2014, but is still remanded and has to face charges for the two other charges of sedition (for allegedly arranging a boycott campaign during the 2013 Swazi elections) and terrorism (for allegedly criticising the Swazi government and king).
