= Swaziland Federation of Trade Unions =

SFTU
- Swaziland Federation of Trade Unions
- Founded: 1973
- Dissolved: 2012
- Headquarters: Manzini, Eswatini
- Location: Swaziland (since 2018 renamed to Eswatini)
- Members: 40,000
- Key people: Barnes Dlamini, president
- Affiliations: ITUC

The Swaziland Federation of Trade Unions (SFTU) was a national trade union center in Swaziland (since 2018 renamed to Eswatini). It was founded in 1983 and dissolved into the Trade Union Congress of Eswatini (TUCOSWA) in 2012.

The SFTU was involved in the campaign to win democratic and pluralist reforms in Swaziland, as well as the removal of restrictive labour legislation.

Members of the SFTU faced considerable opposition. In 1995, general secretary at the time, Jan Sithole was threatened with deportation, and later kidnapped and abandoned in the boot of a car. In 2002, he was publicly threatened by a Swazi senator and government delegate to the International Labour Organization.

The death of Mxolisi Mbata, treasurer of the SFTU, was attributed to injuries he incurred as a result of a beating received from police after they broke up an SFTU general council meeting.

The Congress of South African Trade Unions (COSATU) was an outspoken and active supporter of the SFTU.

The SFTU was affiliated with the International Trade Union Confederation.

== Affiliates ==
There were 21 trade unions affiliated to the SFTU.

- Building and Construction Workers Union (BCAWU)
- Swaziland Agricultural and Plantation Workers Union (SAPAWU)
- Swaziland Commercial Workers Union (SCAWU)
- Swaziland Electricity Workers Union (SEWU)
- Swaziland Hotel and Catering Allied Workers Union (SHCAWU)
- Swaziland Manufacturing Allied Workers Union (SMAWU)
- Swaziland Motor Engineering Allied Workers Union (SMEAWU)
- Swaziland Media and Publications Workers Union (SMEPAWU)
- Swaziland Mining and Quarry Allied Workers Union (SMQAWU)
- Swaziland National Association of Civil Service (SNACS)
- Swaziland National Association of Nurses (SNAN)
- Swaziland Post and Telecommunications Workers Union (SPTWU)
- Swaziland Transport and Allied Workers Union (STAWU)
- Swaziland Union of High Learning Institutions (SUHLI)
- Swaziland Union of Town Councillors (SUTC)
- Swaziland Water and Co-operation Workers Union (SWCWU)
