= Human trafficking in Eswatini =

Human rights concern

Eswatini formerly known as Swaziland, a country located in Southern Africa is a source, destination, and transit country for women and children subjected to trafficking in persons, specifically commercial sexual exploitation, involuntary domestic servitude, and forced labor in agriculture. Swazi girls, particularly orphans, are subjected to commercial sexual exploitation and involuntary domestic servitude in the cities of Mbabane and Manzini, as well as in South Africa and Mozambique.

Swazi boys are trafficked within the country for forced labor in commercial agriculture and market vending. Some Swazi women are forced into prostitution in South Africa and Mozambique after voluntarily migrating to these countries in search of work. Chinese organized crime units transport some Swazi victims to Johannesburg, South Africa, where victims are "distributed" locally or sent overseas for subsequent exploitation.

Traffickers in 2009 reportedly forced Mozambican women into prostitution in Eswatini, or else transitted Eswatini with their victims en route to South Africa. Mozambican boys migrated to Eswatini for work washing cars, herding livestock, and portering; some of these boys subsequently became victims of trafficking.

The Government of Eswatini does not fully comply with the minimum standards for the elimination of trafficking; however, it is making significant efforts to do so. This assessment is based in part on the government's commitment to undertake additional action over the coming year, particularly enforcement of its newly enacted comprehensive anti-trafficking legislation.

The U.S. State Department's Office to Monitor and Combat Trafficking in Persons placed the country in "Tier 2 Watchlist" in 2017 and in 2023.

Eswatini ratified the 2000 UN TIP Protocol in September 2012.

The Organised Crime Index of 2023 gave Eswatini a score of 4.5 out of 10 for human trafficking, noting that a lack of prosecutions and shelters led a large number of people being trafficked, mainly to South Africa.

== Prosecution (2009) ==
The Swazi government increased its capacity to conduct anti-trafficking law enforcement efforts, although no suspected trafficking offenders were arrested or prosecuted during the reporting period. In 2009, the government enacted comprehensive anti-human trafficking legislation, which provides for the prosecution of trafficking offenders and protections for victims, including immunity from prosecution for immigration violations.

The People Trafficking and People Smuggling (Prohibition) Act, 2009 became effective in December 2009. The legislation considers consent and past sexual behavior of the trafficked persons to be immaterial, and incorporates provisions against money laundering as a way to identify persons involved in human trafficking. The Act covers both internal and transnational forms of trafficking and provides for victim restitution through the forfeiture of convicted offenders' movable property. The law prescribes penalties for all forms of trafficking, including the act of facilitating trafficking offenses, of up to 20 years' imprisonment, plus a fine determined by the court to compensate the victim for his or her losses; these penalties are sufficiently stringent and commensurate with penalties prescribed for other serious crimes, such as rape. Likewise, the prescribed penalties of up to 25 years' imprisonment for trafficking children for any purpose are also sufficiently stringent.

The government began educating officials and law enforcement officers on the provisions of the new law, and the media reported that officers had begun making inquiries into possible trafficking situations. Police investigated one possible trafficking situation, though no arrests were made in connection with the case and further information was not available. The government did not provide any specialized training in victim identification for law enforcement and immigration personnel, though it began planning for such future training.

== Protection (2009) ==
The Government of Eswatini took initial steps to create greater capacity for protecting trafficking victims, though it did not identify or assist any victims during the reporting period. Procedures for the government to provide victims with access to legal, medical, and psychological services were not implemented during the reporting period. The Anti-Trafficking Task Force, however, began developing such procedures, as well as formal procedures on the proactive identification of victims for law enforcement, immigration, and social services personnel. The Task Force also investigated how it can best be prepared to provide assistance to repatriated Swazi trafficking victims who had been identified in foreign countries.

Eswatini's new anti-trafficking law empowers the government, by notice in an official gazette, to declare any house or building a place of refuge for the care and protection of trafficking victims, though the government did not open such victim care centers in Eswatini during the reporting period. Existing halfway houses run by the government and NGOs to shelter abused, abandoned, and vulnerable children and women victims of domestic violence could provide assistance to victims of trafficking. Policies on issues such as the victim's right to civil redress are under development. The government did not offer foreign victims alternatives to their removal to countries where they may face danger or hardship.

== Prevention (2009) ==
During the year, the government increased its efforts to prevent trafficking. The Prime Minister created the Task Force for the Prevention of People Trafficking and People Smuggling in July 2009, which includes representatives from multiple government and law enforcement agencies, UNICEF and UNDP, and NGOs focused on assisting women, children, victims of crime, and other vulnerable populations. The Task Force met regularly, and began developing a national plan of action and various standard operating procedures. Government officials, accompanied by Task Force members, conducted seminars about what the nature of human trafficking and discussed the proposed legislation in all four regions of the country in 2009.

The Prime Minister launched Eswatini's branch of the regional "Red Light 2010 Campaign", building on publicity surrounding the 2010 FIFA World Cup soccer championship in South Africa, to mobilize trafficking prevention activities. All Swazi media covered the meetings extensively.

The Swazi government created an anti-trafficking hotline for victims needing assistance, and for the public to report suspected occurrences of trafficking. The hotline will be managed by the police domestic violence unit and connect to investigators and caregivers as needed. In 2009, officials from Mozambique, South Africa, and Eswatini held meetings to discuss ways of reducing demand for commercial sex acts in relation to the 2010 FIFA World Cup in South Africa.

== See also ==
- Human rights in Eswatini
