= Prostitution in Africa =

Decriminalization – no criminal penalties for prostitution Legalization – prostitution legal and regulated Abolitionism – prostitution is legal, but organized activities such as brothels and pimping are illegal; prostitution is not regulated. Neo-abolitionism – illegal to buy sex and for 3rd party involvement, legal to sell sex Prohibitionism – prostitution illegal Legality varies with local laws

The legal status of prostitution in Africa varies widely. It is frequently common in practice, partially driven by the widespread poverty in many sub-Saharan African countries, and is one of the drivers for the prevalence of AIDS in Africa. (36.9% in sub-Saharan Africa) Senegal and Côte d'Ivoire permit the operations of brothels. In other countries, prostitution may be legal, but brothels are not allowed to operate. In some countries where prostitution is illegal, the law is rarely enforced. However, there are growing efforts by activists on the continent to decriminalize sex work.

Transactional sexual relationships are particularly common in sub-Saharan Africa, where they often involve relationships between older men and younger women or girls. In many cases, the woman in a transactional sexual relationship may remain faithful to her boyfriend, while he may have multiple sexual partners. In both of these cases, transactional sex presents an increased risk of HIV infection. As a result, transactional sex is a factor involved in the spread of AIDS in Africa.

This page uses the UN system of subregions.

== Central Africa ==
=== Cameroon ===
Cameroon
- Prostitution illegal Buying sex legal

Prostitution in Cameroon is illegal but tolerated, especially in urban and tourist areas. In the capital, Yaoundé the main area of prostitution is the neighbourhood of Mini Ferme. UNAIDS estimate there are 110,000 sex workers in the country.

Cameroon attracts sex tourism from the West, especially for child prostitution. The Cameroonian government has attempted to stop this trade by agreeing to multilateral agreements such as charters against sex tourism, like signing up with the Universal Federation of Travels Agents Associations (UFTAA).

=== Central African Republic ===
Central African Republic
- Prostitution legal Buying sex legal Brothels illegal Procuring illegal

Prostitution is legal and common in the Central African Republic. Procuring or profiting off the prostitution of others is illegal, as is coercing people into prostitution. Punishment is a fine and up to one year in prison, or 5 years if the case involves a minor.

Human trafficking and Child prostitution is a problem in the country. A study published in 2017 found that about two thirds of the prostitutes in the capitol, Bangui, worked part-time to supplement their income or to pay school and college fees. Some of the full-time prostitutes visit hotels, bars and nightclubs looking for wealthy clients, especially French men. They are known as "pupulenge" (dragonflies) or "gba moundjou" (look at the white). Those who work in the poorer neighbourhoods are known as "kata".

=== Chad ===
Chad
- Prostitution illegal Buying sex legal

Prostitution in Chad is illegal, but common, especially in the urban centres and the south of the country. UNAIDS estimates there are 1,200 prostitutes in the country. Many are from Cameroon.

Like many Sub-Saharan African countries, HIV is a problem in Chad. Sex workers are one of the high risk groups. Lack of understanding of the infection, low usage of condoms and poor access to healthcare contribute to a HIV prevalence rate of 20%. This figure is likely to be higher in the Lake Chad area.

=== Democratic Republic of the Congo ===
Democratic Republic of the Congo
- Prostitution legal Buying sex legal Brothels illegal Procuring illegal Solicitation illegal

Prostitution in the Democratic Republic of the Congo is legal but the Congolese penal code punishes pimping, running a bawdy house or brothel, the exploitation of debauchery or prostitution, as well as forced prostitution. Activities that incite minors or promote the prostitution of others have been criminalised. UNAIDS estimated there are 2.9 million sex workers in the country. Many Congolese prostitutes are from abroad or homeless children who have been accused of witchcraft.

During the colonial era and the years that followed independence, the Ministry of Health issued calling cards identifying professional sex workers and provided them with medical health checks. However, this system was abandoned in the 1980s. Public order laws are sometimes used against sex workers. Street prostitutes report harassment, violence and extortion from the police.

=== Equatorial Guinea ===
Equatorial Guinea
- Prostitution illegal Buying sex legal

Prostitution in Equatorial Guinea is illegal. UNAIDS estimate there to be about 6,000 prostitutes in the country. Sex trafficking is a problem in the country. Some Chinese women engage in prostitution in Equatorial Guinea.

=== Gabon ===
Gabon
- Prostitution illegal Buying sex legal

Prostitution in Gabon is illegal. UNAIDS estimate there to be about 400 prostitutes in the country. Sex trafficking is a problem Gabon.

During his trial in Paris in 1995, Italian fashion designer Francesco Smalto admitted providing the then President of Gabon, Omar Bongo with Parisian prostitutes to secure a tailoring business worth $600000 per year.

=== Republic of the Congo ===
Republic of the Congo
- Prostitution illegal Buying sex legal

Prostitution in the Republic of the Congo is illegal but commonplace. The government does not enforce the prohibition effectively.

Sex trafficking is a problem in the country.

== East Africa ==
=== Burundi ===
Burundi
- Prostitution illegal Buying sex legal

Prostitution in Burundi is illegal but is commonplace and on the rise. Prostitution is prevalent in all areas of the country, and especially in the largest city and former capital, Bujumbura, and prior to the security crisis in 2015, the tourist areas around Lake Tanganyika. UNAIDS estimate there are 51,00 prostitutes in Burundi. Many women have turned to prostitution due to poverty.

Previously law enforcement made little effort to curb prostitution. Political pressures, including from the mayor of Bujumbura, Freddy Mbonimpa, have led to crackdowns all over the country.

HIV, sex trafficking and child prostitution are problems in the country.

=== Comoros ===
Comoros
- Prostitution illegal Buying sex legal

Prostitution in Comoros is illegal. It is openly practices in the hotels frequented by foreign nationals. UNAIDS estimate there are 200 prostitutes on the islands.

Comoros is a source country for children subjected to sex trafficking within the country. Women and girls are reportedly subjected to sex trafficking in Comoros. Comorians may be particularly vulnerable to transnational trafficking due to a lack of adequate border controls, corruption within the administration, and the existence of international criminal networks involved in human smuggling.

=== Djibouti ===
Djibouti
- Prostitution illegal Buying sex legal

Prostitution in Djibouti is illegal, but tolerated. UNAIDS estimate there are 2,900 prostitutes in the country. Many work from bars and nightclubs. There is a red-light district in Djibouti City.

Due to its strategic position, troops from United States, China, France, Japan, Saudi Arabia, Italy. Russia, Spain, Germany and the United Kingdom are stationed in bases in Djibouti. The presence of these troops increases the demand for prostitution. During an investigation in 2015, it was found almost half of the Engineering Department of the Tennessee Army National Guard had used prostitutes whilst stationed in Djibouti.

=== Eritrea ===
Eritrea
- Prostitution legal and regulated Buying sex legal

Prostitution in Eritrea is legal and regulated. Official figures state there are around 2,000 prostitutes in the country, who are not allowed to operate near schools, hospitals, and churches. According to the 2009 Human Rights Reports, security forces occasionally follow women engaged in prostitution and arrest those who had spent the night with a foreigner. Some women enter prostitution due to poverty.

Prostitutes are known locally as "shermuta" in Arabic, or "mnzerma" and "me'amn" in Tigrinya.

=== Ethiopia ===
Ethiopia
- Prostitution legal Buying sex legal Brothels illegal Procuring illegal

Prostitution in Ethiopia is legal, but procuring (operating brothels, benefiting from prostitution, etc.) is illegal according to Article 634 of the Ethiopian Penal Code, as revised May 2005. Many feel it has contributed to the increased incidence of AIDS. UNAIDS estimate there are over 29,358 prostitutes in the major cities.

Ethiopia has become a magnet for sex tourism, including child sex tourism.

In 2015, Ethiopian scriptwriter and film director, Hermon Hailay, directed the film Price of Love, which was inspired by her experiences growing up close to prostitutes.

=== Kenya ===
Kenya
- Prostitution legality varies from area to area Buying sex legal Brothels illegal Procuring illegal

Prostitution in Kenya is widespread. The legal situation is complex. Although prostitution is not criminalised by National law, municipal by-laws may prohibit prostitution. (Nairobi banned all sex work in December 2017). It is illegal to profit from the prostitution of others, and to aid, abet, compel or incite prostitution. (Sections 153 and 154 of the Penal Code).

Many foreign men and women take part in sex tourism, which is thriving at resorts along Kenya's coast. Thousands of girls and boys are involved in full-time child prostitution due to poverty in the region.

=== Madagascar ===
Madagascar
- Prostitution legal Buying sex legal Brothels illegal Procuring illegal Solicitation illegal

Prostitution in Madagascar is legal and common, especially in tourist areas. Related activities such as soliciting, procuring, living off the earnings of prostitution or keeping a brothel are prohibited. Public Order laws are also used against prostitutes. There are recent laws against "consorting with female prostitutes". People caught paying for sex with children under 14 can face criminal penalties of up to 10 years imprisonment. This is strictly enforced against foreign tourists. As well as in the tourist areas, prostitution also occurs around the mining towns of the interior such as Ilakaka and Andilamena. It was estimated that there were 167,443 sex workers in the country in 2014.

=== Malawi ===
Malawi
- Prostitution legal Buying sex legal Brothels illegal Procuring illegal Solicitation legal

Prostitution in Malawi is legal and prevalent around hotels and bars in urban and tourist areas. Living off the proceeds of prostitution is illegal. In 2015, it was estimated there were 20,000 sex workers in the country.

Prostitution occurs around the logging centres of Luwawa, Nthungwa, Raiply and Kalungulu. The prostitutes work from small shacks around the villages in the forests.

Human trafficking, HIV and child prostitution are problems in the country.

=== Mauritius ===
Mauritius
- Prostitution illegal Buying sex legal

Prostitution in Mauritius is illegal but practised in parts of Port Louis and other towns. Many turn to prostitution through poverty. UNAIDS estimate there to be 6,223 prostitutes in the country.

The country is a destination for sex tourism, especially child sex tourism.

=== Mayotte ===
Mayotte
- Prostitution legal Buying sex legal

Prostitution in Mayotte occurs on the ring road and in the villages of Mtsapere and Kaweni in the commune of Mamoudzou. Many of the prostitutes are illegal immigrants from Madagascar and Comoros, who are transported to the islands at night in kwassa-kwassa boats. An area in Passamainty, also part of the Mamoudzou commune, used for drugs and prostitution, was destroyed by locals in July 2016.

=== Mozambique ===
Mozambique
- Prostitution legal Buying sex legal Brothels illegal Procuring illegal

Prostitution in Mozambique is legal and widely practised, and the country also contains illegal brothels. The majority of the population remains below the poverty line, a situation which provides fertile soil for the development of prostitution.

The arrival of peacekeepers operating under the auspices of the UN resulted in an increase in the prostitution industry. In 1992, prostitution in Mozambique had reached such proportions that the post of mediator was created between the military on the one hand and pimps and prostitutes on the other. The problem of prostitution in Mozambique came under international discussion for the first time in the mid 1990s, when the deputy head of the UN mission Behrouz Sadri accused UN peacekeepers of buying sex from underage prostitutes.

=== Réunion ===
Réunion
- Prostitution legal Buying sex legal

Following the French law prohibiting "passive soliciting" in 2003, street prostitution in Réunion was greatly reduced. Many prostitutes now use classified advertisements in newspapers such as "Clicanoo" (Journal de l'île de La Réunion) and the internet. Some students at the University of La Réunion use prostitution to fund their way through university.

=== Rwanda ===
Rwanda
- Prostitution illegal Buying sex illegal

Prostitution is illegal in Rwanda. in all aspects. Prostitutes, clients and any involved third parties (such as pimps and brothel keepers) are criminalised by the Penal Code. However, a draft of a new Penal code that doesn't prohibit prostitution was presented for debate in the Rwandan Parliament in December 2017.

Due to the immense poverty in the country, many women have been forced into prostitution to make money. In 2012 it was estimated that there were 12,278 sex workers in the country. It is thought that 45.8% of sex workers in Rwanda are HIV positive.

=== Seychelles ===
Seychelles
- Prostitution illegal Buying sex legal

Prostitution in Seychelles is illegal but remains prevalent. Police generally do not apprehend prostitutes unless their actions involved other crimes. Many of the estimated 586 prostitutes on the islands are foreign.

=== Somalia ===
Somalia
- Prostitution illegal Buying sex legal

Prostitution in Somalia is illegal. Although forced marriages exist in areas under insurgent control, there is generally little voluntary prostitution and pre-marital sex in the country according to the African Medical Research and Education Foundation (AMREF). UNAIDS estimated there were 1957 sex workers in Somalia in 2016.

Sex trafficking and child prostitution are problems in the country.

=== South Sudan ===
South Sudan
- Prostitution legal Buying sex legal Brothels illegal Procuring illegal

Prostitution in South Sudan is legal but related activities such as soliciting or brothel-keeping are illegal.

Since independence from Sudan in July 2011, prostitution has expanded considerably, mainly due to an influx of prostitutes from nearby African countries. In the capital, Juba, the number of prostitutes rose from a few thousand at the time of independence to an estimated 10,000 in 2014. Juba has a large percentage of foreign residents including aid workers and UN personnel. Many of these are single men, or married men living away from home. Their relative wealth has attracted women and girls from within South Sudan and also from Kenya, Congo, Uganda, and Khartoum.

Sex workers are subject to police harassment and brutality.

=== Tanzania ===
Tanzania
- Prostitution illegal Buying sex legal

Prostitution in Tanzania is illegal but widespread. Many women and young girls are forced into prostitution due to poverty, lack of job opportunities, culture, and the disintegration of the family unit. Many university students have to turn to prostitution for economic reasons.

Sex trafficking and child prostitution are a major problems in Tanzania.

The country is a destination for sex tourism, including female and child sex tourism, especially in the coastal resorts and Zanzibar.

=== Uganda ===
Uganda
- Prostitution illegal Buying sex legal

Prostitution in Uganda is illegal according to Uganda's 1950 Penal Code, but is widespread despite this. Many turn to prostitution because of poverty and lack of other opportunities. A study of Kampala teachers in 2008 showed that teachers were turning to prostitution to increase their income. A sex worker can earn around 1.5 million Ugandan shillings (£439) per month, whereas this would be a yearly wage for a secondary school teacher. There are many Kenyan prostitutes in the country.

Sex trafficking, HIV, and Child prostitution are problems in the country.

=== Zambia ===
Zambia
- Prostitution legal Buying sex legal Brothels illegal Procuring illegal Solicitation illegal

Prostitution in Zambia is legal and common. Related activities such as soliciting and procuring are prohibited. UNAIDS estimate there are 9,285 prostitutes in the capital, Lusaka. Many women turn to prostitution due to poverty. Sex workers report law enforcement is corrupt, inconsistent and often abusive.

In Lusaka, some prostitutes enrol in colleges to obtain a campus room to work from.

Zambia has a huge problem relating to child prostitution. There is a mistaken belief that having intercourse with a virgin will cure AIDS. HIV and sex trafficking are also problems in the country.

=== Zimbabwe ===
Zimbabwe
- Prostitution illegal Buying sex legal

Prostitution in Zimbabwe and related acts, including solicitation, procuring, and keeping a brothel, are illegal but thriving. Zimbabwe's dire economic situation has forced many women into sex work.

In 1983 there was a major effort to eliminate sex work in post-independence Zimbabwe by rounding up hundreds of women and detaining them until they could prove they were not involved in the trade, otherwise they were sent to resettlement camps. A number of women's groups supported this as strengthening marriage.

== Northern Africa ==
=== Algeria ===
Algeria
- Prostitution legal Buying sex legal Brothels illegal Procuring illegal Solicitation illegal

Prostitution in Algeria is legal but most related activities such as brothel keeping and solicitation are criminalised.

As a result of Arabization of the country, the rise of Islamism and the civil unrest following the economic downturn caused by the 1980s oil glut, brothels were banned in 1982. This forced many of the prostitutes to work on the streets. There are however two brothels that continue to operate under the former French occupation rules of registration and medical examination with the complicity of the Algerian authorities.

=== Egypt ===
Egypt
- Prostitution illegal Buying sex legal

Prostitution in Egypt is illegal. Police department officially combats prostitution but, like almost all other countries, prostitution exists in Egypt. The prostitutes in Egypt are Egyptian, Russian, and of many other nationalities.

Prostitutes in Ancient Egypt were respected and even considered sacred as the first institutions where prostitution flourished were the temples of the Gods. The god Amun indulged in sexual activity with many women under a religious guise. Families often gave their most beautiful daughters to the priests of his temple. As soon as they grew too old for the tastes of the priests they were allowed to leave. Many practised prostitution until they were married.

=== Libya ===
Libya
- Prostitution illegal Buying sex legal

Prostitution in Libya is illegal, but common. Since the "Popular Revolution" in 1973, laws based on Sharia's zina are used against prostitutes; the punishment can be 100 lashes. Exploitation of prostitutes, living off the earnings of prostitution or being involved in the running of brothels is outlawed by Article 417 of the Libyan Penal Code. Buying sexual services isn't prohibited by law, but may contravene Sharia.

Many of the sex workers are from Nigeria (over 1,000 in 2015). There are also sex workers from other sub-Saharan African countries such as Ghana, Liberia and Sierra Leone. Desperate to flee the poverty of their countries, they have often been trafficked to Libya with the promise of a job in Italy. Some are working as prostitutes in Libya to pay off debt bondage in the hope of travelling on to Italy.

=== Morocco ===
Morocco
- Prostitution illegal Buying sex legal

Prostitution has been illegal in Morocco since the 1970s. In 2015 the Moroccan Health Ministry estimated there were 50,000 prostitutes in Morocco, the majority in the Marrakech area.

Many children are vulnerable as adoption laws in Morocco are very rigid and difficult. Morocco's increasing reputation for attracting foreign pedophiles made it sign various international treaties to deal with the problem. Male prostitution exists but is stigmatised. Health services for Moroccan sex workers include OPALS.

=== Sudan ===
Sudan
- Prostitution illegal Buying sex legal

Prostitution in Sudan is illegal but widespread. UNAIDS estimate there to be 212,493 prostitutes in the country.

=== Tunisia ===
Tunisia
- Prostitution illegal Buying sex illegal

Prostitution was legal and regulated until 2022 when it was banned by the government.

== Southern Africa ==
=== Angola ===
Angola
- Prostitution illegal Buying sex legal

Prostitution in Angola is illegal and prevalent since the 1990s. Prostitution increased further at the end of the civil war in 2001. Prohibition is not consistently enforced. Many women engage in prostitution due to poverty. It was estimated in 2013 that there were about 33,000 sex workers in the country. Many Namibian women enter the country illegally, often via the border municipality of Curoca, and travel to towns such as Ondjiva, Lubango and Luanda to work as prostitutes.

=== Botswana ===
Botswana
- Prostitution legal Buying sex legal Brothels illegal Procuring illegal Solicitation illegal

Prostitution in Botswana is not illegal per se, but laws such as public disorder, vagrancy, loitering and state recognised religious provisions are used to prosecute prostitutes. Related activities such as soliciting and brothel keeping are illegal. Botswana has made proposals to make prostitution legal to prevent the spread of AIDS. However, there has been mass opposition to it by the Catholic Church. Prostitution is widespread and takes place on the street, bars, hotels, brothels and the cabs of long-distance trucks.

The Gaborone West shopping complex and the streets surrounding it, are the main area of prostitution in the capital, Gaborone. The Itekeng ward of Francistown (locally known as 'Doublers') is the main area of prostitution in the city. The majority of the prostitutes in both cities are from Zimbabwe.

=== Eswatini ===
Eswatini
- Prostitution illegal Buying sex legal

Prostitution in Eswatini is illegal, the anti-prostitution laws dating back to 1889, when Swaziland was a protectorate of South Africa. Law enforcement is inconsistent, particularly near industrial sites and military bases. Police tend to turn a blind eye to prostitution in clubs. There are periodic clamp-downs by the police.

Senator Thuli Mswane and NGOs Swaziland AIDS Support Organisation (SASO), Sex Workers Education and Advocacy Taskforce (SWEAT) and Mpumalanga Treatment Action Campaign (TAC) have recommended that prostitution be legalised in Swaziland, in order to allow it to be regulated to reduce harm to the prostitutes and limit the spread of HIV.

Sex trafficking, child prostitution and HIV are problems in the country.

=== Lesotho ===
Lesotho
- Prostitution legal Buying sex legal Brothels illegal Procuring illegal Solicitation illegal

Prostitution in Lesotho is legal but solicitation and 3rd party involvement are criminalised by section 55 of the Penal Code. There are estimated to be 6,300 prostitutes in Maseru and the Leribe District.

HIV is endemic in the country, especially amongst sex workers, who are estimated to have an HIV prevalence of 71.9%.

=== Namibia ===
Namibia
- Prostitution legal Buying sex legal Brothels illegal Procuring illegal Solicitation illegal

Prostitution in Namibia is legal and a highly prevalent common practice. Related activities such as solicitation, procuring and being involved in the running of a brothel are illegal. A World Bank study estimated there were about 11,000 prostitutes in Namibia.

Prostitution takes place all over the country, particularly in border areas, transport corridors, Walvis Bay and the capital Windhoek. Most prostitutes are Namibian, but there are also a significant number from Zambia, Botswana and Angola. Most women work independently and few have pimps.

Most prostitutes in Namibia meet their clients either on the street or in bars. Bars often have a room on the premises for the prostitutes to use, and brothels usually have a bar, so the line between a bar and a brothel is often blurred. Some, more up-market, sex workers are contacted by cell phone or the internet and work in high-end clubs and hotels.

=== South Africa ===
South Africa
- Prostitution illegal Buying sex illegal

Prostitution is illegal in South Africa for both buying and selling sex, as well as related activities such as brothel keeping and pimping However, it remains widespread. Law enforcement is poor.

In 2013 it was estimated that there were between 121,000 and 167,000 prostitutes in South Africa.

HIV, child prostitution (including sex tourism) and human trafficking are problems in the country.

== Western Africa ==
=== Benin ===
Benin
- Prostitution legal Buying sex legal Brothels illegal Procuring illegal Solicitation illegal

Prostitution in Benin is legal but related activities such as brothel keeping and benefiting from the prostitution of others are illegal. UNAIDS estimates there to be about 15,000 prostitutes in the country. Most of these are migrants from neighbouring countries, mainly Nigeria, Togo and Ghana. Only 15% of the prostitutes are Beninese. Prostitution occurs on the streets, in bars, restaurants, hotels and brothels. With advent of the smartphone, many prostitutes use apps to make arrangements with clients.

Many women enter prostitution for economic reasons. Some young Beninese women learn English so they can go to Nigeria to work as prostitutes as Nigeria has a thriving sex industry.

In rural areas widows will discretely turn to prostitution to support her family. This is a cultural and social tradition that is not regarded as prostitution by the community, but is regarded as a method of preserving the family name. Any children born from these liaisons take the dead husband's name. It's not uncommon for a widow to have five children after her husband has died.

=== Burkina Faso ===
Burkina Faso
- Prostitution legal Buying sex legal Brothels illegal Procuring illegal Solicitation illegal

Prostitution in Burkina Faso is not specifically prohibited by the law, but soliciting and pimping are illegal. Burkinabe society only accepts sexual intercourse within marriage. In 2009, Voice of America reported that the number of prostitutes in Burkina Faso had increased as a result of the country's poverty. The increase in prostitution has given rise to fears of an increase in the number of Burkinabés infected with HIV and AIDS.

In the capital, Ouagadougou, the main area of prostitution is in the Dapoya district.

Although homosexuality is illegal in the country, male prostitution takes place, especially in the tourist areas.

=== Cape Verde ===
Cape Verde
- No prostitution laws

Prostitution in Cape Verde is legal and commonplace. There are no prostitution laws on the islands except for those concerning trafficking and child prostitution. UNAIDS estimate there are 1,400 prostitutes in Cape Verde, many were from Ghana and Senegal before being expelled by the police. Some turn to prostitution through poverty.

Sex tourism, including child sex tourism, is a major occurrence in Cape Verde, especially in Santa Maria and the tourist beach resorts on the Cape Verdian island of Sal. The islands are also a destination for female sex tourism.

=== Côte d'Ivoire (Ivory Coast) ===
Ivory Coast
- Prostitution legal Buying sex legal Brothels illegal Procuring illegal Solicitation illegal

In Côte d'Ivoire, prostitution itself (exchanging sex for money) is legal, but associated activities, such as soliciting, pandering or running brothels, are illegal. Sex workers report law enforcement is sparse and corrupt. Police sometimes harass sex workers and demand bribes or sexual favours. Transgender prostitutes are often targeted by police and soldiers and subjected to violence. It was estimated in 2014 that there were 9,211 prostitutes in the country. The civil war has left many women in need for wages, so some have resorted to prostitution, as there is high unemployment.

In the capital, Abidjan, most of the prostitutes come from Ghana, Nigeria, Togo, Mali, Senegal and other West African states, the largest group being from Ghana.

=== The Gambia ===
Gambia
- Prostitution illegal Buying sex legal

Prostitution in the Gambia is widespread but illegal. Most of the prostitutes in the Gambia are from Senegal. Prostitution takes place on the beach, in bars and hotels on the coast. Away from the coast, prostitution mainly takes place in bars. The bars are frequently raided and the foreign prostitutes deported. They often return within a few days.

The HIV infection rate for prostitutes is high.

=== Ghana ===
Ghana
- Prostitution illegal Buying sex legal

Prostitution in Ghana is illegal but widespread, so much so that many Ghanaians are unaware that it's prohibited. There are growing problems of sex tourism, child prostitution and human trafficking. High rates of unemployment and poverty in Ghana are believed to be causing a growth in the sex industry. Unemployment is a reason teenage workers engage in sex work. A high percentage of sex workers are vulnerable to HIV.

Some prostitutes in Ghana are campaigning for the sex trade to be legalised, and discussions have taken place.

=== Guinea ===
Guinea
- Prostitution illegal Buying sex legal

Prostitution in Guinea is illegal. There are estimated to be 8,357 prostitutes in the country.

According to the 2014 Trafficking in Persons Report, Women from Thai, Chinese, Vietnamese are also forced prostitution in Guinea.

=== Guinea-Bissau ===
Guinea-Bissau
- No prostitution laws

Prostitution in Guinea-Bissau is common and there are no prostitution laws. In 2016 it was estimated there were 3,138 prostitutes in the country. Often it is associated with other crimes: Many pimps are also reported to be drug dealers. Poverty leads many women to be tempted into prostitution and cocaine addiction.

Many of the prostitutes in Bissau and other towns in Guinea-Bissau are Manjako women from Caio in the Cacheu Region. They tend to be over 30 and wait in designated rooms in their houses for clients. Occasionally they will go to a local bar in search of clients. Prostitutes from Caio also travel to Ziguinchor in Senegal and Banjul in The Gambia to work.

=== Liberia ===
Liberia
- Prostitution illegal Buying sex legal

Prostitution is illegal but widespread in Liberia. There are estimated to be 1,822 prostitutes in the country. Like its neighbor, Sierra Leone, child prostitution has seen an increase in the aftermath of civil war.

=== Mali ===
Mali
- Prostitution legal Buying sex legal Brothels illegal Procuring illegal

Prostitution is legal in Mali, but third party activities such as procuring are illegal. Prostitution is common in Malian cities. UNAIDS estimate there to be 35,900 prostitutes in the country. Prostitution is on the rise, many having turned to prostitution because of poverty.

In the capital, Bamako, a large number of the prostitutes are from Nigeria and other West African countries. In July and August there is an influx of students from various areas of West Africa who work as prostitutes during the summer vacation. There are also many Chinese bars in the country where prostitution occurs. It is estimated that the Chinese sex workers send 2 billion Cfa back to China annually. Many Nigerian prostitutes work in the area around the Morila Gold Mine.

=== Mauritania ===
Mauritania
- Prostitution illegal Buying sex legal

Prostitution in Mauritania is illegal. There are estimated to be 315 prostitutes in the country. in the capital, Nouakchott, there is a red-light district in the El Mina district. Law enforcement is ineffective and corrupt.

=== Niger ===
Niger
- Prostitution illegal Buying sex legal

Prostitution in Niger is illegal but common in the cities, near mines and around military bases. UNAIDS estimate there are 46,630 sex workers in the country. Many have turned to prostitution because of poverty.

Some Nigerian prostitutes ply their trade on the Niger border as many prostitutes are persecuted in their homeland and Niger is perceived as being more amiable and less likely to prosecute them for their trade. Nigerian men prefer to cross the border to seek sex as the punishment in Islamic Nigeria is 50 lashes for "procuration of woman".

In 2017 the government ordered a clampdown on prostitution throughout the country.

=== Nigeria ===
Nigeria
- Prostitution illegal in Northern States; Prostitution legal in Southern States; Buying sex illegal in Northern States; Buying sex legal in Southern States; Brothels illegal Procuring illegal

Prostitution in Nigeria is illegal in all Northern States that practice Islamic penal code. In Southern Nigeria, the activities of pimps or madams, underage prostitution and the operation or ownership of brothels are penalised under sections 223, 224, and 225 of the Nigerian Criminal Code. Even though Nigerian law does not legalize commercial sex work, it is vague if such work is performed by an independent individual who operates on his or her own accord without the use of pimps or a brothel.

Nigeria has become a major exporter of women for prostitution. Deputy president of Senate Ike Ekweremadu has proposed a bill to legalise prostitution.

=== São Tomé and Príncipe ===
São Tomé and Príncipe
- Prostitution illegal Buying sex legal

Prostitution in São Tomé and Príncipe is illegal. UNAIDS report there are 89 prostitutes in the capital, São Tomé. When the islands were settled on by the Portuguese in 1493 under Álvaro Caminha, prostitutes were amongst the degredados sent to the colony.

=== Senegal ===
Senegal
- Prostitution legal & regulated Buying sex legal Brothels illegal Procuring illegal Solicitation illegal

Prostitution in Senegal is legal and regulated. Prostitutes must be at least 21 years of age, register with the police, carry a valid sanitary card, and test negative for sexually transmitted infections. It has been legal since 1969 to sell sex as long as prostitute has registered, over 21 years old, has a regular medical check-up, and can present an up-to-date medical report card to the police upon request according to Under Senegal's Penal Code (articles 318 to 327 bis). The average age for a sex worker in Senegal is 28 years old and female. Senegal has the distinction of being the only country in Africa to not only legalise prostitution but regulate it. The only condition that it is done discreetly. Prostitution was first legalised in 1966.

=== Sierra Leone ===
Sierra Leone
- Prostitution legal Buying sex legal Brothels illegal Procuring illegal Solicitation illegal

Prostitution in Sierra Leone is legal and commonplace. Soliciting and 3rd party involvement are prohibited by the Sexual Offences Act 2012. UNAIDS estimate there are 240,000 prostitutes in the country. They are known locally as 'serpents' because of the hissing noise they use to attract clients.

Since the end of the ten-year civil war in Sierra Leone, there has been an increase in child prostitution, especially among children who are struggling to survive. This has happened in spite of the fact that child prostitution is illegal in the country.

=== Togo ===
Togo
- Prostitution legal Buying sex legal Brothels illegal Procuring illegal Solicitation illegal

Prostitution in Togo is legal and commonplace. Related activities such as solicitation, living off the earnings of prostitution or procuring are prohibited. Punishment is up to 10 years imprisonment if minors or violence is involved.

In 2014, it was estimated there were 10,284 sex workers in the country. A 2011 survey found 51% worked in bars and 26% in brothels. About half of the country's sex workers are in Lomé. According to research published in 2015, between 2005 and 2015, prostitution in the country increased 180%, and that three quarters of the prostitutes are Togolese, and Ghanaian women 15%. It is not uncommon for prostitutes travel between Togo and neighbouring countries to find work.

== See also ==
- Transactional sex
- Prostitution in South Africa
- Prostitution in Cape Town, South Africa During the Late Victorian Era
