= Ayanda Denge =

South African trans woman and sex worker

- Born: Ayande Dange; 1982; Port Elizabeth in South Africa
- Died: 24 March 2019 (aged 36–37); Port Elizabeth of South Africa
- Cause of death: murdered
- Citizenship: South Africa
- Organization(s): Embrace Dignity, Reclaim The City, Sex Workers Education and Advocacy Taskforce (SWEAT), Sisonke Sex Worker Movement (Sisonke), TB/HIV CARE Association, SistazHood Asijiki Coalition for the Decriminalisation of Sex Work, Women's Legal Centre (WLC)
- Movement: Anti-prostitution feminism, Trans rights movement, HIV/AIDS activism, and housing activism

Ayanda Denge (1982 – 24 March 2019) was a South African trans woman, HIV and cancer survivor, and child sexual exploitation and sex trafficking survivor. She advocated for the right to housing, transgender rights, and for the rights of people (mostly women) who had survived sex trafficking.

Although she had earlier worked with sex worker–rights organisations such as the Sex Workers Education and Advocacy Taskforce (SWEAT), Denge later became associated with abolitionist positions, and joined the South African feminist organisation Embrace Dignity, which campaigns for the abolition of prostitution and sex trafficking under the "Equality Model".

== Life ==
Denge was Xhosa, and grew up in the city of Port Elizabeth, in the Eastern Cape in South Africa.

Denge lived in Cape Town, South Africa. She lived on the street for a period before moving into the Helen Bowden Nurses' Home in Green Point. The former nurses' home is owned by the provincial government, but had been unlawfully occupied by tenants' group Reclaim the City, which campaigns for affordable housing, and renamed the Ahmed Kathrada House. In February 2019, she had been elected a house leader.

=== Death ===
Denge was murdered in her room on 24 March 2019 at the age of 37 years Old. She was stabbed and left lying on her floor. It was reported that Denge's room was locked with a padlock from the outside and it was only when a leader at the residence peeped through the window out of concern for her well-being that anyone noticed her body on the floor. The electricity had been cut, causing the building to be completely dark at night. She had been living with someone, who disappeared after the killing.

== Activism ==
Denge lost her mother at the age of 12 and, together with her two brothers, was left to fend for herself. Then, she was sexually abused in a public bathhouse. Afterwards the man paid her, and she realized that this was a way to survive. When she grew up, she began working in Johannesburg and later in other cities across Southern Africa, including Harare, Durban, Cape Town, Port Elizabeth, and Victoria Falls.

Denge worked as outreach co-ordinator for the Sisonke Sex Worker Movement (Sisonke) for two years.

Denge was the chairperson of the Sex Workers Education and Advocacy Taskforce (SWEAT). She was an advocate for transgender people, sex workers, and for the decriminalisation of sex work. In her role with Sex Workers Education and Advocacy Taskforce (SWEAT), Denge trained 50 peer educators and worked as a motivational speaker on "cancer awareness, HIV/AIDS awareness, and human rights advocacy issues related to sex work". She also worked on the project "Integrate – HIV/AIDS Reduction for Sex Workers" at the TB/HIV CARE Association. She advocated for the rights of people living with HIV, and was a member of SistazHood, the female transgender sex worker human rights, health, and support group at SWEAT.

Denge led SWEAT through the August 2015 launch in Cape Town of the Asijiki Coalition for the Decriminalisation of Sex Work, where she delivered a speech. The organisation includes sex workers, activists, and advocates and defenders of human rights, and the steering committee consists of the Sisonke Sex Worker Movement (Sisonke), the Women's Legal Centre (WLC), the Sex Worker Education and Advocacy Taskforce (SWEAT), and Sonke Gender Justice. The organization aims through decriminalization to reduce the vulnerability of sex workers to violence and illness, and increase their access to labor, health, and justice services.

Denge was interviewed by the Daily Vox while attending the 2016 International AIDS Conference in Durban, "Being transgender is not a double dose, but it's a triple dose of stigmatisation and discrimination. You are discriminated against for your sexual identity, you are discriminated against for your work, and you are discriminated against of your HIV status." She spoke out also against emotional abuse and police brutality, noting that the police confiscated sex workers' condoms.

=== Shift from Full Decriminalization to the Equality Model ===
In a 2018 profile published by Women in the World, Denge initially became involved with the sex worker–rights organization Sex Workers Education and Advocacy Taskforce (SWEAT), supporting its advocacy for full decriminalization. However, after witnessing severe exploitation — including the case of a woman forced back to the streets days after giving birth — she began questioning the framing of prostitution as “work” and ultimately resigned.

She later joined Embrace Dignity, a feminist human-rights organization promoting the Equality Model, which decriminalizes people selling sex while penalizing pimps and buyers and emphasizing exit services and social support. Through Embrace Dignity, Denge advocated for law reform in South Africa and highlighted coercion and exploitation in the sex trade.
