= Prostitution in South Africa =

Prostitution in South Africa is illegal for both buying and selling sex, as well as related activities such as brothel keeping and pimping. However, it remains widespread. Law enforcement is poor.

In 2013 the Sex Workers Education and Advocacy Task Force (SWEAT) estimated that there were between 121,000 and 167,000 prostitutes in South Africa.

HIV, child prostitution (including sex tourism) and human trafficking are problems in the country.

== Legal and regulatory framework ==
The Immorality Act, 1927 prohibited extramarital sex between "Europeans" and "natives". This was redefined by the Immorality Amendment Act, 1950 as illicit carnal intercourse between "Europeans" and "non-Europeans".

The Immorality Act, 1957, later renamed the Sexual Offences Act, 1957, repealed the 1927 Act (as amended) and introduced new offences for brothel keeping, pimping and procuring. Interracial sex was now criminalised as unlawful carnal intercourse between "white" and "coloured" people.

The Criminal Procedure Act 51 of 1977 criminalised "committing an immoral or indecent act with such other person" and also soliciting for the same.

Municipal by-laws also contained provisions about prostitution.

As part of the repeal of many apartheid laws under P. W. Botha's government, the Immorality and Prohibition of Mixed Marriages Amendment Act 1985 repealed the interracial restrictions of the Immorality Acts.

The Immorality Amendment Act, 1988 renamed the Immorality Act, 1957 to the Sexual Offences Act, 1957 and criminalised the act of prostitution. It also made the provisions of the 1957 Act gender neutral.

In 2002, an appeal by brothel keepers and prostitutes in the country's Constitutional Court, submitting that the laws on prostitution were in breach of the constitution, was dismissed.

The most recent legislative change was the Criminal Law (Sexual Offences and Related Matters) Amendment Act, 2007, section 11 which added Section 20(1)(aA) of the SOA, which states that any person who has unlawful carnal intercourse or commits an act of indecency with any other person for reward, is guilty of an offence, effectively criminalising the client as well as the prostitute.

In 2017 a report by the South African Law Reform Commission, recommended that the current law be retained (preferred option), or that prostitution should be decriminalised but third party involvement should remain illegal.

=== Decriminalisation ===
Decriminalisation has been under active discussion since 2009. Currently the South African Law Reform Commission has four proposals that were submitted for public discussion ranging from criminalisation to decriminalisation.

In the run-up to the 2010 Football World Cup, there were calls to decriminalise and regulate prostitution when an estimated 40,000 prostitutes were expected to travel to South Africa for the tournament.

In March 2012, the ANC Women's League came out in favor of decriminalisation, and stated that they will campaign for this to become an ANC policy. It is argued that decriminalisation "would challenge the stigma that surrounds sex workers. It would help secure their human rights and dignity, and make for safer work and living conditions for them." Decriminalising prostitution would limit the power the police have on sex workers and it would stop the police or law enforcers from taking advantage of sex workers. Police enforcement is rigorous and police taking and accepting bribes by the sex workers and their clients is common place.

In April 2013, the Commission for Gender Equality also stated its support for decriminalization. They argued that current laws violate sections of the constitution, and that sex workers would be better protected if the law is changed.

Sex Workers Education and Advocacy Task Force (SWEAT), is a group based in South Africa that has been working to decriminalize sex work and eventually legalize it. They also provide health services for sex workers since they can't access them elsewhere. They have launched different programs to bring awareness to problems facing sex workers such as Sex Work Empowerment and Enabling Environment (SWEEP), #SayHerName, advocacy and law reform, and Sisonke movement.

Human Rights Watch in its August 2019 report claimed that the sex workers in South Africa faced frequent arbitrary arrests and police profiling. In order to avoid police harassment, workers are forced to work in dangerous areas. Out of the 46 female sex workers interviewed by HRW, most of them had been raped by men purporting to be clients, and almost all had been victims of robbery or serious violence, including being beaten, whipped, and stabbed. Liesl Gerntholtz, acting deputy executive director for programme at Human Rights Watch, said "Sex workers in South Africa face arrest, detention, harassment, and abuse from police, which also deters them from reporting rape or other brutal attacks against them."

In December 2022, the government published a draft bill that would legalise sex work.

== Police violence ==
There are numerous allegations of members of the South African Police Service committing acts of violence and abuse against sex workers. 70 per cent of sex workers who approached the Women's Legal Centre to report a violation said that they had experienced police abuse in some form, including beating and rape. In an interview, one sex worker in Cape Town said: "The coloured police officer grabbed me, and my clothes came off. Then they pepper sprayed me in my mouth and beat me". Sex workers are often afraid to report police violence to the authorities.

== 2010 World Cup ==
There were fears of increased prostitution in connection with the 2010 Football World Cup, some sources estimating that an extra 40,000 sex workers would enter South Africa for the competition. As a result, there were calls for prostitution to be legalised and regulated to help control AIDS and STDs and for the protection of the sex workers. However, this generated considerable opposition and no changes were made to the laws.

Despite the fears, there was little evidence of increased prostitution.

== HIV ==
South Africa has one of the world's largest HIV epidemics. A study by the SA National Aids Council (Sanac) estimated that there was a 60% infection rate, although this varies from area to area, for example, Johannesburg 72%, Durban 54% and Cape Town 40%.

The reluctance to use condoms has contributed significantly to the epidemic. However condom distribution by the government and HIV communication programmes have reduced the rate of new instances.

== Child prostitution ==
Child prostitution is a problem in the country. Whilst there are no reliable figures available, it has been estimated that there are as many as 30,000 children involved. South Africa has become one of the major destinations for underage sex tourism in Africa. Cape Town, Johannesburg, Port Elizabeth and Durban has become popular destinations for this.

Criminal gangs recruit children from poor rural areas and take them to larger cities for commercial sexual exploitation.

== Sex trafficking ==
South Africa is a source, transit, and destination country for women and children subjected to sex trafficking. Local criminal gangs dominate child sex trafficking. Nigerian gangs control the sex industry in several provinces. Thai and Chinese nationals control the sex trafficking of Asian women. Russian and Bulgarian organised crime control trafficking in Cape Town.

Hundreds of Women from Thailand, China, Brazil, Eastern Europe, Asia, and neighboring African countries are trafficked into South Africa and forced to work as prostitutes.

South Africa is listed as a Tier 2 Watch List country by the US Department of State's Office to Monitor and Combat Trafficking in Persons.

== See also ==
- Asijiki Coalition for the Decriminalisation of Sex Work
- Sex Workers Education and Advocacy Taskforce
- SistaazHood
- Prostitution in Cape Town, South Africa during the late Victorian era
