= Prostitution in Eswatini =

Prostitution in Eswatini is illegal, the anti-prostitution laws dating back to 1889, when the country Eswatini was a protectorate of South Africa. Law enforcement is inconsistent, particularly near industrial sites and military bases. Police tend to turn a blind eye to prostitution in clubs. There are periodic clamp-downs by the police.

Senator Thuli Mswane and NGOs Eswatini AIDS Support Organisation (SASO), Sex Workers Education and Advocacy Taskforce (SWEAT) and Mpumalanga Treatment Action Campaign (TAC) have recommended that prostitution be legalised in Eswatini, in order to allow it to be regulated to reduce harm to the prostitutes and limit the spread of HIV.

Sex trafficking, child prostitution and HIV are problems in the country.

== Overview ==
It was estimated that there were around 4,000 sex workers in the country in 2015, with the highest concentrations in Matsapha, Manzini, Malkerns and Ezulwini. Most sex workers are Mozambican or Swazi. It is reported that sex workers are subject to abuse and forced sex by police. Some prostitutes occasionally travel to other countries, especially Maputo in Mozambique, to work on a temporary basis. Many women and children turn to prostitution because of poverty.

After European settlement, westernisation, the development of urban centres and migrant labour, especially in the mining areas, saw a rise in prostitution. Sex tourism by South Africans occurred in the 1970s, not only further increasing the demand for prostitution, but instigating a move by the sex workers from the mining areas to urban hotels. Eswatini was more liberal than South Africa and had no apartheid laws.

In 2001, sex workers in Manzini started to offer clients sexual services on credit.

During a 2007 survey, sex workers said their clients included business people, church pastors, Government officials (MPs, cabinet ministers), lawyers, lecturers, police officers, soldiers, foreigners, tourists, doctors and truck drivers.

== HIV ==
HIV/AIDS in Eswatini was first reported in 1986 but has since reached epidemic proportions due in large part to cultural beliefs which discourage safe-sex practices. Coupled with a high rate of co-infection with tuberculosis, life expectancy has halved in the first decade of the millennium. Eswatini has the highest prevalence of HIV as percentage of population 19–49 in the world as of 2016 (27.2%).

Sex workers are a high risk group and HIV prevalence was estimated at 60.5% in 2014. Many clients are reluctant to use condoms and will pay more for unprotected sex.

== Sex trafficking ==
Eswatini is a source, destination, and transit country for men, women, and children subjected to sex trafficking. Swazi girls, particularly orphans, are subjected to sex trafficking, primarily in Eswatini and South Africa. Traffickers reportedly force Mozambican women into prostitution in Eswatini, or transport them through Eswatini to South Africa. Some Swazi women are forced into prostitution in South Africa and Mozambique after voluntarily migrating in search of work. Reports indicate a downturn in the textile industry following loss of eligibility under the African Growth and Opportunity Act in 2015 has led textile workers to follow promises of employment in neighbouring countries, potentially increasing their vulnerability to trafficking.

The United States Department of State Office to Monitor and Combat Trafficking in Persons ranks Eswatini as a "Tier 2 Watch List" country.
