= Robert A. Hamblin =

Visual artist and activist

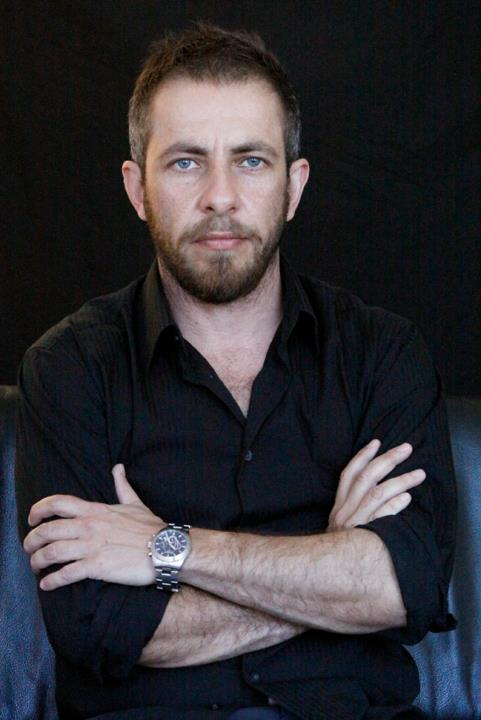
- Hamblin in 2014
- Born: 1969 (age 56–57)
- Occupations: Visual artist working mainly in photography & paint on paper. Activist.
- Notable work: InterseXion, Robert. A Queer and Crooked Memoir 2021
- Awards: Houston Centre for Photography Fellowship (The Binary Farm), SA Kanna nomination Award (“when you feeling like a lady)

Robert A. Hamblin (born 1969) is a South African-born visual artist, working mainly in photography and paint on paper.

== Early life and career ==
Robert A. Hamblin was born in Hillbrow, Johannesburg in 1969, and assigned female at birth. Discomforts with gender permeated his fine art work from very early and became a key subject by the time he transitioned from female to male in his thirties.

He completed High School in Alberton, Gauteng Province (Johannesburg region) in 1986, working as a freelance darkroom assistant and photographer for the final two years of his schooling.

After completing high school, he worked as a commercial photographer in the theatre and performing arts fields. These platforms informed the working style of his fine art work, and shows clearly in his first publicly exhibited body of work, Millennium Man in 1998. Actors and sets were used to reflect narratives wherein gender identity was probed and became the visual narrative wherein Hamblin continued to work in the two decades that followed.

In 2006 in his mid-thirties, Hamblin started his gender transition from female to male. Subsequently in 2007, he helped found the African organization Gender DynamiX, an organization concerned with the rights of trans people, holding the position of Deputy Director responsible for Advocacy and media liaison from 2009 - 2011.

Today, he continues both his art work and activism which has led up to the release of his autobiography in June 2021. During the first lockdowns of the COVID-19 pandemic, Hamblin started painting self-portraits which have been exhibited in Cape Town and Johannesburg.

== Work ==
=== Photographer ===
Hamblin was a keen photographer from an early age. He bought his first camera and darkroom equipment by photographing male athletes at school and selling the photos to their teenage fans. He began his commercial career as a newspaper editorial photographer for South African newspapers Beeld, Die Transvaler and Rapport from 1987 to 1991. In his early twenties he started his freelance work as a photographer in the theatre, television and editorial media where he worked from 1991 – 2009. Concurrently he developed multiple fine art bodies of photography works which were exhibited internationally and at South African galleries and art festivals.

Millennium Man was his first public exhibition at an arts festival, taking a closer look at men and perceived notions of masculinity in an increasingly 'feminised’ world. Two decades later his last body of photographic work, interseXion, was a collaboration with black transgender sex workers including Leigh Davis which took seven years to produce, culminating in a solo exhibition at the Iziko South African National Gallery in Cape Town. His latest exhibition is I Just Told the Stars Who I Am at the 99 Loop Gallery.

=== Artist ===
Hamblin has no formal art training or tertiary education other than twenty years of mentorship with 1953 Académie Ranson abstract painter Nel Erasmus. His art work focuses on issues of queer masculinity as a transgender person and he has exhibited both in South Africa and internationally.

Hamblin published his autobiography Robert: A Queer and Crooked Memoir for the Not So Straight and Narrow ( ISBN 9781928420972; Epub ISBN 9781928420989) in June 2021, through NB Publishers and Melinda Ferguson Books.

=== Activism ===
Hamblin's art and life as a trans person has reflects to gender identity. From 2007 to 2009 he was instrumental in the founding of the African organisation Gender DynamiX and served as Deputy Director for Advocacy and media liaison from 2009 to 2011. He has advocated for the rights of transgender persons using his own experiences. “If you understand gender, you will understand that pronouns are a way of giving someone humanity. And when you misgender someone, you take away their humanity. To learn is not a comfortable thing. It's painful, because you're redirecting your neural pathways. It's all about working towards kindness.”

After his work at Gender DynamiX he was a co-founder of a support group for transgender sex-workers at a Cape Town non-profit organisation SWEAT. During this time he developed his interest in gender theory within the context of sex workers' rights.

=== Organizational work ===
- Iranti (transgender and lesbian focus) Board Chairperson 2019 - 2021
- Iranti (transgender and lesbian focus) board member 2016 - 2020.
- The Sistaaz Hood Support Group for Transgender women sex workers. Founder member, volunteer consultant Sex Worker Education Advocacy Taskforce (SWEAT): 2011-2020.
- Gender DynamiX (GDX) Founder board member, board chairperson, advocacy manager, deputy director: 2006 - 2011.

== Awards ==
- Fellowship Award at the Houston Centre for Photography in Texas (The Binary Farm).
- South Africa Kanna nomination Award. Klein Karoo National Arts Festival (“when you feeling like a lady)

== Exhibitions ==
=== Solo ===
- 2021 I Just Told the Stars Who I Am 99 Loop Gallery.
- 2018 InterseXion Iziko South African National Gallery, Cape Town
- 2017 InterseXion Johannesburg, Bloemfontein
- 2017 The Colony University of Stellenbosch Art Museum Cape Town
- 2016 Threshold International Young Photographers Festival, Daegu, South Korea
- 2015 Daughter Language Lizamore & Associates Gallery, Johannesburg
- 2014 The Colony, University of Johannesburg Gallery, Johannesburg
- 2013 “..When You're Feeling Like a Lady..” University of Cape Town Centre for African Studies Gallery, African Gender Institute
- 2013 The Colony Aardklop National arts festival, Potchefstroom
- 2006 The Binary Farm Cape Town, Potchefstroom
- 2000 The Post Christian Open Window Art Academy, Pretoria, Potchefstroom
- 1998 Millennium Man Potchefstroom, Cape Town, Johannesburg
- 1996 In a Different Light Private Studio, Johannesburg

=== Group ===
- 2021 Abstrakt Nel on Long Street Gallery, Cape Town
- 2020 Paintings (Beyond Exhibition), Dawid Ras Gallery, Johannesburg
- 2016 Daughter Language (DF Group 1 Exhibition), Erdmann Contemporary Group, Cape Town
- 2015 InterseXion (Queer in Africa Conference), The District Six Museum Homecoming Centre, Cape Town (Collaboration with The Sistaaz Hood)
- 2015 Daughter Language (Lizamore & Assoc artist), Cape Town Art Fair
- 2015 Daughter Language (Break the Spell exhibition), Oude Libertas Gallery Stellenbosch, Cape Town
- 2014 “when you feeling like a lady” (Nomad bodies exhibition), Antwerp University College of Artesis, Royal Academy of Fine Arts, Belgium.
- 2013 The Morality Monkeys (group exhibition), Dstreet Gallery, Stellenbosch, South Africa
- 2013 Nomad Bodies, Wintertuin Gallery, University College of Artesis, Royal Academy of Fine Arts, Antwerp
- 2013 Tom Waits for No Man, KKNK & venues nationwide, South Africa
- 2013 Five Photographers, Dawid's Choice Gallery, Johannesburg
- 2010 Swallow Your Pride, Blank Projects, South Africa
- 2008 Legacy of Men, Johannesburg Art Gallery
- 2006 Binary Farm (with Neo Ntsoma and Jurgen Schadaberg), University of Johannesburg Gallery
- 2006 Round Table, ArtSpace, Johannesburg
- 2006 Father (video), Out in Africa Film Festival & Hamburg LGBT Film Festival,
- 2006 The Best of KKNK, Gordon Froud Contemporary, Johannesburg
- 2004 Gender, (HCP fellowship award), Houston Centre of Photography, Rice University, USA
- 2003 Inner Room (group), Aluvert, Johannesburg
- 2002 Time Shift with Nel Erasmus, ArtSpace, Johannesburg

=== Collections ===
- University of Johannesburg
- William Humphreys art Gallery, Kimberly, South Africa

== Publications ==
- New Museum/MIT Press “Representation and Its Limits” Critical Anthology on Trans Cultural Production & the Politics of Visibility - 2017.
- How poverty and gender inequality weave across a human body - Lucinda Jolly Business Day.
- Art that explores fatherhood and transracial adoption - Dr. Richardt Strydom Mail and Guardian.
- Amsterdam University Press: “Queer Visual Activism in South Africa” - Dr. Tessa Lewin.
- The Aesthetics of Global Protest
- Wasafari Journal - “Prosody for a Queer Alphabet: Contemporary Performance Art Practices in South Africa”, Dr. Roelof Petrus van Wyk.
- The Journalist: Thabo Thwala - “Intersexion: an exhibition steeped in transgender sex work”.
- Cape Times - Confines of a Man.
- Eyemazing Susan Annual Pictorial Vol.II - Lucie Award Winner.
- Unisa Press “(Dis)Engaging the Gaze – Moving Images and the Lives of Trans Sex Workers” Dr. Ernst van der Wal.
- Stellenbosch University Publications - Body of/in Work: Volatile Images and the Representation of Trans Sex Workers Dr. Ernst van der Wal.
- Feminist Africa 14 Rethinking Gender and Violence 2010

== Media ==
- The Homebru Podcast 2021. Interview with Jonathan Ancer August 2021.
- Daily Maverick: Interview with Karin Schimke
- Cape Talk: Radio interview on his memoir Robert: A Queer & Crooked Memoir
- News24: Article by Shaun De Waal August 2021
- Luan Nel on Robert A. Hamblin July 2021
- Book review on SABC NEWS June 2021
- Podcast. Down Memoir Lane with Robert A. Hamblin
- Book review Mamba online June 2021
- LitNet Interview with Robert A. Hamblin (Afrikaans) July 2021
- Daily Maverick: Voices of the body by Shaun De Waal June 2007
