= Human trafficking in Mozambique =

In 2009 Mozambique was a source and, to a much lesser extent, a destination country for men, women, and children subjected to trafficking in persons, specifically forced labor and forced prostitution. The use of forced and bonded child laborers was common in rural areas of the country, often with the complicity of family members. Women and girls from these rural areas were also lured to cities with promises of employment or education, as well as to South Africa for involuntary domestic servitude and forced prostitution. NGO's reported that Mozambican victims of sex traffickers were taken by traffickers to "training centers" in Eswatini and South Africa in preparation for an expected increase in demand for prostitution during the 2010 World Cup. Young Mozambican men and boys were subjected to conditions of forced labor in South African farms and mines; they often labored for months in South Africa without pay and under coercive conditions before being turned over to police for deportation as illegal migrants. Mozambican adults were subjected to forced labor and forced prostitution in Portugal. Women and girls from Rhodesia and Malawi who voluntarily migrate to Mozambique continued to be manipulated by traffickers into forced prostitution and domestic servitude subsequent to their arrival. There were an estimated 145,600 people living in slavery in Mozambique and countless more being taken unwillingly into South Africa.

Traffickers were typically part of loose, informal networks of Mozambican or South African citizens; however, larger Chinese and reportedly Nigerian trafficking syndicates were also active in Mozambique. Human traffickers' internal and cross-border routes were also used to smuggle illicit drugs; often, the same facilitators transported both drugs and trafficked victims. In addition, South Asian smugglers who moved South Asian undocumented migrants throughout Africa reportedly also transported trafficking victims through Mozambique. Internal and transnational trafficking in persons for the purposes of forcible organ removal to support an offshoot of the traditional healing industry in South Africa and Mozambique was significant. Witch doctors in Mozambique and other countries forcibly removed various body parts from children and adults, either while the victims are still alive or immediately following violent death, for use in "traditional" medical concoctions intended to heal illness, foster economic advancement, or hurt enemies.

In 2009 the Government of Mozambique did not fully comply with the minimum standards for the elimination of trafficking; however, it is making significant efforts to do so. Despite these efforts, including work on the development of implementing regulations for its new anti-trafficking law, the government did not show evidence of increasing efforts to address human trafficking, particularly efforts to prosecute or convict trafficking offenders as it has done in the past, or to investigate continuing reports of government officials' complicity in trafficking crimes.

The country ratified the 2000 UN TIP Protocol in September 2006.

The U.S. State Department's Office to Monitor and Combat Trafficking in Persons placed the country in "Tier 2 Watchlist" in 2017 and 2023.

In 2023, the Organised Crime Index gave Mozambique a score of 4.5 out of 10 for human trafficking.

== Causes ==
=== Women's issues ===
There is both an expectation for women to get married and to get married young so they are no longer a burden to their family financially. Women who remain unmarried are more at risk to be trafficked because of their limited economic opportunities (Britton). Traditional Mozambican societies do not operate in favor of single women and this is what forces them to seek out other ways to make a living. It is reported that "global colonialism and imperialism reflect a series of unequal power relations and hierarchical power structures in which poor girls and women in general, and poor girls and women of color in particular, are located at the bottom of global power structures" (Gale). This is very true in Mozambique and women make up the majority of people that are trafficked into South Africa. Women with black, brown, and gold skin tones are most at risk because they are seen as "exotic" which makes them desirable to others in the global sex trade (Gale). In more traditional and rural areas of Mozambique, jobs can be denied to women based on their status, family name, and cultural background. In many situations women of a lower class are limited in the jobs that they are able to secure, leaving them with little money to buy essentials and take care of their families. In Mozambique, "Poverty distribution is heavily gendered, with female-headed households as most vulnerable group" (Women's Age Indicator). Poverty, in many cases, is a pipeline to human trafficking and women living in poverty are more exposed to this because they are likely to look for different forms of work to support themselves. Women desperate to find husbands are more likely to be lured by false pretenses, and women who do not get married by a certain age may be driven to find alternate forms of work putting them at risk for be trafficked.

=== Cultural values ===
Traditional Mozambican values foster acceptance and trustworthiness of men which plays to the advantage of many traffickers. Women specifically are taught to trust men because in Mozambique, "Sexuality is often perceived as a site for women's subordination" (Arnfred). Marriage is an institution that gifts a woman's sexuality to her husband, and can impede her advancement in Mozambican society (Arnfred). Women are taught to rely on men which can put them in vulnerable situations when it comes to trafficking. A popular African proverb says, "If you want to go fast go alone. If you want to go far go together" (Tu) and this is what people abide by in Mozambique. The idea that collectivism is the key to success is prominent in the minds of many Mozambicans living in traditional communities. People often trust that those around them have their best interest in mind and with the rocketing number of human trafficking cases of people being kidnapped from Mozambique to be sold in South Africa that is not always the case. Louisa, a girl that was kidnapped from her rural village, talked about her journey in an interview with Deutsche Welle News and how she ended up in that situation. Louisa was walking home when she encountered a man who offered her work at his house to clean for him. When she got there he threatened her and took her to South Africa with no documentation. At the end of the interview her mother then said, "At fifteen my daughter had never encountered a person in our village who didn't tell her the truth" (DW News).

=== Unstable domestic economy ===
Mozambique is one of the poorest countries in the world with a high unemployment rate and a lack of infrastructure. Despite the rapid economic growth after its democratization, the wealth is not equally distributed but is mainly concentrated in the top ten percent. The average income of the top ten percent is five times higher than the national average income, the amount that corresponds to the half of the total rural income. Amongst the poor rural population, Europe is often regarded as a land with opportunities, security and wealth. The young Mozambican population from the low-income household is often encouraged to undertake a risky journey to Europe for a better economic opportunity by their families. However, the migration to Europe makes them susceptible to become victims of human trafficking. The reinforcement of anti-trafficking policies adopted by European nations to combat human trafficking often ends up further marginalizing these migrants from developing countries such as Mozambique. As a consequence, these anti-trafficking policies result in rigorous immigration policies, which also involve forced deportation, thus threatening the security of the migrants from foreign countries. In addition, the approach of international organizations deepened the disparity between the rich and the poor by putting an excessive emphasis on adopting market economies, privatizing national companies, and cutting national spending

== Types ==
=== Sex trafficking ===
Although sex trafficking is often utilized as a synonymous term for prostitution, it is a concept that also includes pornography, exotic dancing, stripping, live sex shows, mail-order brides, military prostitution, and sexual tourism. Forced prostitution is the most prevalent form of sex trafficking in Southern Africa. However, the covert nature of the sex trafficking business makes it challenging to collect accurate data to evaluate the exact scope and nature of the business in the region, particularly on the exploitation of the victims in the pornography industry and sex brothels.

=== Organ trafficking ===
It is reported that murders and human trafficking are committed to harvesting human organs in Mozambique. Witch doctors were often accused of creating a greater demand for human organs because of the belief that human genitals can bring fortune and prosperity. However, recent critics reveal that this myth that blames witch doctors as the root of the problem is fabricated by the police who are deeply involved in the human organ trafficking business. Because of its proximity to South Africa, Mozambique can provide the South African organ trafficking business with an inexpensive, profitable option.

== Efforts to combat human trafficking ==
=== Prosecution (2009) ===
In September 2008, the government enacted a new comprehensive human trafficking law. The law prescribes penalties of 16 to 20 years' imprisonment for those recruiting or facilitating the exploitation of a person for purposes of prostitution, forced labor, slavery, or involuntary debt servitude; these penalties are sufficiently stringent and exceed those for other serious crimes. During 2009, the government again budgeted $360,000 to support enforcement of the law and for a second year did not allocate this funding to any government entity. Implementing regulations for the law have not been issued; without these regulations, the police were not generally in a position to arrest suspected trafficking offenders and conduct an investigation that could successfully support a court case. The government formed partnerships with NGO's to provide anti-trafficking seminars for new police officers throughout the country. Police reported arresting trafficking offenders and breaking up several trafficking schemes during the year, including the arrest of at least one suspected trafficking ringleader. In January 2010, police arrested a man in Beira for allegedly running a criminal ring involved in the sale of hard drugs and in sex trafficking. The media reported that the suspect had at least one police officer on her payroll. In March 2010, police arrested eight traffickers after being alerted by undercover journalists that the traffickers had offered to "sell" them several girls and women. Within weeks, all of the suspects were released on bail. Traffickers commonly bribed law enforcement officials to allow their movement of trafficking victims internally and across national borders into South Africa and Eswatini, sometimes without passports. There is no evidence of widespread government involvement in or tolerance of trafficking; however, there are known cases of government officials facilitating human trafficking. No officials have been investigated, detained, or prosecuted for complicity in trafficking crimes. For the first time, police began to keep statistics on trafficking victims; this data was not available at the time of the publication of the US 2009 report.

=== Protection (2009) ===
The Mozambican government suffers from limited resources and a lack of political commitment regarding human trafficking. Funding for victims' assistance remained rudimentary, and government officials regularly relied on NGOs to provide shelter, counseling, food, and rehabilitation. The government continued to lack formalized procedures for identifying potential victims of trafficking and referring them to organizations providing protective services. The Office of Assistance to Women and Vulnerable Children continued its partnership with a network of anti-trafficking NGOs to respond quickly to tips on potential trafficking cases and provide care and protection to victims. UNICEF helped police establish the first-ever police station specifically designed to assist women and children, including trafficking victims, in Maputo. A dedicated toll-free number, "116," became fully operational in November 2009, allowing persons to report crimes against children, including trafficking. Line "116" received 5,239 calls from November through December 2009, though it is not known how many of these were related to human trafficking. An NGO managed the country's only permanent shelter for child trafficking victims, which operated on land donated by the Moamba District government. The government encouraged victims to assist in the investigation and prosecution of traffickers and did not penalize victims for unlawful acts committed as a direct result of being trafficked. The government did not provide legal alternatives to the removal of foreign victims to countries where they would face hardship or retribution.

==== Sex trafficking protections ====
The establishment of the Protocol to Prevent, Suppress and Punish Trafficking in Persons, Especially Women and Children, supplementing the United Nations Convention against Transnational Organized crime in 2000 is one of the policies being implemented by officials in order to combat human trafficking. Promoting women's empowerment is a way that the African Union and Southern African Development Community have chosen to fight human trafficking. It has proved to be hard for the government to prosecute crimes related to sex trafficking and provide support for victims. Government funding, community cooperation, and acceptance of the issue are part of what makes sex trafficking in Mozambique difficult to combat. The government does have action plans in place, but they are almost never followed through. Last year, "the government maintained inadequate protection efforts... and offered limited shelter, medical, and psychological assistance." (U.S. Department of State). Information reported to police is often not followed up on making it hard for the government to help those in need. Other public health related issues in the country often take priority to combating human trafficking does not always take priority in terms of funding. At risk groups have been identified by outside support systems, yet, "Maputo has 'failed to identify or protect victims during the last year, and funds for the fight were not used in the best manner'" (VOA). The government has not taken combating this issue a seriously they could and most of the money that goes towards to combating trafficking come from NGOs which can be taken away at any time.

=== Government efforts (2009) ===
The government's prevention efforts remained weak during the reporting period. The government did not launch a nationwide campaign to foster awareness of trafficking among government officials and private citizens. As a result, most Mozambicans, including many law enforcement officials, reportedly lacked a clear understanding of what constitutes trafficking. Officials met regularly with the Anti-Trafficking Forum, which provided a mechanism through which the government and its NGO partners could discuss trafficking issues and coordinate their anti-trafficking activities. Most anti-trafficking educational workshops were run by NGOs with some government participation. Media coverage of trafficking cases or issues significantly diminished over the past year, although a sting operation which led to the arrest of eight Mozambican and Chinese sex traffickers in March 2010 was featured prominently in the news. Law enforcement officials and partner NGOs monitored major border crossings and immigration patterns for indications of potential trafficking victims, but these officials remained prone to complicity with traffickers. The Ministry of Justice worked with a network of NGOs to develop an anti-trafficking strategy for the 2010 World Cup, which may increase the incidence of trafficked Mozambicans transported to South Africa for commercial sexual exploitation, but implementation was poor. The government did not take any significant measures to reduce the demand for forced labor or commercial sex acts during the year.

=== Palermo protocols ===
Mozambique is one of the 159 countries that ratified the Palermo protocols, the international legal framework designed to prevent human trafficking, particularly targeted at women and children, and to promote cooperation of different countries to eradicate human trafficking. Although the protocols are often criticized for the lack of appropriate evaluation process of each member state and the lack of clear guidance to identify human trafficking victims, the Palermo protocols still hold significance as an international effort to combat human trafficking. The Palermo protocols have also been a foundation of the Publicação oficial da república de Moçambique. Lei no. 6/2008, a Mozambican legislation to counter human trafficking. This legislation not only punishes the violators but also acknowledges the importance of rehabilitating the victims. It also advocates international cooperation to eradicate human trafficking to facilitate the repatriation of Mozambican victims who reside in other countries. However, legal institutions in many nations in Africa, including Mozambique, lack the authority to enact the law.
