= Leigh Davids =

South African activist and sex worker (1979 –2019)

- Born: 25 March 1979; Cape Town
- Died: 27 February 2019 (aged 39)
- Occupation: Sex workers' rights activist, sex worker

Leigh Davids (25 March 1979; 27 February 2019) was a South African transgender woman, political activist and advocate for transgender sex workers’ rights and the decriminalization of sex work.

== Early life ==
Davids was born into a Muslim family in Cape Town. She left home at 14 to escape abuse and discrimination from her family, who did not accept her gender identity. She turned to sex work to support herself, after which, like many other sex workers in South Africa, she suffered police harassment and abuse. These experiences informed her activist work in later life and influenced her fight for the decriminalization of sex work in South Africa.

== Career as an activist ==
Davids worked for GenderDynamix, SWEAT (Sex Workers Education and Advocacy Taskforce), GALA, and SRJC (Sexual and Reproductive Justice Commission). She was a founding member and coordinator of SistaazHood, a transgender women sex worker support group, founded in 2010, which is the largest of its kind in Africa. In 2016, SHE (Sexual Health Empowerment) awarded her for Movement Building in South Africa.

In 2017, Davids participated in the Zeitz MOCAA Curatorial Lab LGBTQI+ Forum and Press Workshop, and in 2018 she was the focus of photographer Robert Hamblin’s exhibition elevating the voices of transgender sex workers of colour in Cape Town.

At the 2017 Trans Health, Advocacy and Research Conference in Southern Africa she delivered a presentation entitled “Trans Violent Exclusion” about rising levels of transphobic violence and discrimination in South Africa. She shared a story about her personal daily struggles which highlighted the broader structures of institutional prejudice, sexual and gender-based violence:

[...] they [society] don't speak my language [...] the language a poor, homeless, black person speaks; I mean the language a transgender sex worker of Cape Town speaks, that live[s] on the streets, that has no home. Do anyone of y’all know my language yet? [...] In the morning when I wake up, [and] when the other girls see me under a piece of plastic [...] I think how will I get R40 today? For whom will I perform my poverty for today? Who will humiliate me today when I ask for ARVs? Who will send me away again this year when I say I was raped AGAIN?! Will this be the day that policemen won't make me suck his dick just because I walked to the [bus] stop while being trans? Will I survive this day?

Davids also describes the rejection of poor queer people and sex workers by the South African healthcare system ultimately preventing their access to proper HIV treatment.

Davids is recognized for having dedicated her life to the fight for sex workers’ rights, educating communities about sexual orientation and gender identity, creating safe, supportive spaces for LGBTQA+ people and advocating for fair and equitable access to healthcare.

== Death ==
Davids tested positive for HIV in 2009 and died on 27 February 2019 at Brooklyn Chest Hospital in Cape Town due to related health complications. She died two weeks before her 40th birthday, tragically reflecting a statement she made at the 2018 interseXion exhibition: “International studies show that transgender women have a life expectancy on 30–32 years. We have no studies in South Africa but since 2011 we have photographed 30 black transwomen sex workers for this project – five of us died not reaching the age of 40.”
