= SistaazHood =

South African support organization for transgender sex workers

SistaazHood is a South African activist and advocacy support group embedded at the organisation Sex Workers Education and Advocacy Taskforce (SWEAT). The Sistaaz Hood supports the rights and health of transgender women and sex workers. The group was founded in 2010 and is based in Cape Town. The group is also known for their various photographic collaborations with artists, amongst them the fashion project, Sistaaz of the Castle in collaboration with photographer, Jan Hoek and fashion designer, Duran Lantink, and InterseXion, with artist Robert Hamblin. InterseXion was exhibited at Iziko South African National Art Gallery.

== About ==
SistaazHood was founded in 2010 and represents transgender women in Cape Town who are sex workers, many of whom are homeless. The organization provides community spaces for transgender women. The group was founded by Netta Marcus, Cym van Dyk and Leigh Davids. Marcus brought the women together and they were able to live outside the Castle walls. By 2019, there were around 40 members.

SistaazHood is working to decriminalize sex work. SistaazHood also fights transphobia in the police force and police violence against transgender women. The group has helped the police draft new Standard Operating Procedures in dealing with transgender and homeless people and the law.

They are affiliated with Sex Workers Education and Advocacy Taskforce, a group that advocates for the removal of laws against sex work. SistaazHood also works with the Triangle Project and Gender DynamiX.

=== Sistaaz of the Castle ===
Sistaaz of the Castle is a photographic and fashion collaboration between members of SistaazHood and photographer, Jan Hoek, and Duran Lantink, a fashion designer. The project began in 2014. Women from SistaazHood described the dresses they wanted to wear and Lantink created them for the photo shoots. The collaboration led to the creation of a magazine called Sistaaz of the Castle which donates 100% of the profits back to SistaazHood. The magazine had a printing run of 1,500 copies. The magazine has been able to spread the word about the group, educating the community about them, and also helped give the women a sense of purpose.

== InterseXion ==
InterseXion is a multidisciplinary art project mandated by The Sistaaz Hood support group in 2010 in collaboration with artist Robert Hamblin. The final outcome of the project was a traveling exhibition consisting of photographs, voice work installations and quotations from group members about their work and private lives. The purpose of the exhibition was to advocate around issues that showed how poverty and gender inequality correlates to the identity of the group members.

== See also ==
- LGBTQ rights in South Africa
- Asijiki Coalition for the Decriminalisation of Sex Work
