= InterseXion (art) =

2018 South African exhibition on transgender sex workers

InterseXion is a 2018 South African art exhibition by artist Robert A. Hamblin in association with Leigh Davids and SistaazHood, focusing on the lives of transgender sex workers, particularly trans women. It was shown at the Iziko South African National Gallery in 2018.
