= Reclaim The City =

Affordable housing movement in Cape Town

Reclaim The City (RTC) is a South African non-racial social movement campaigning for land and housing in Cape Town's inner city and wealthy suburbs.

Reclaim The City is known for its campaigns for affordable and low-income housing, as well as for spearheading the occupation of two empty and dilapidated government buildings, which it transformed into housing for poor and vulnerable families.

== Tafelberg campaign ==
Reclaim the City was established in response to the Western Cape Provincial Government's decision to sell the former Tafelberg Remedial School site in Sea Point to the Phyllis Jowell Jewish Day School in 2015. The movement argued that the publicly owned site should instead be used for affordable and social housing because of its location close to employment opportunities and public transport in Cape Town's inner city.

The provincial government sold the property for R 135 million after declaring it surplus to provincial requirements, with the proceeds intended to contribute towards the construction of a new provincial administrative building in Cape Town. Prior to the sale, however, a 2012 feasibility study by the Social Housing Regulatory Authority had identified the site as suitable for inner-city affordable housing.

Following the announcement of the sale, Reclaim the City, together with the housing rights organisation Ndifuna Ukwazi and other supporters, organised protests and challenged the transaction in court. The applicants argued that disposing of the site for private development failed to address Cape Town's legacy of apartheid-era spatial segregation and overlooked the state's constitutional obligations to facilitate access to well-located affordable housing. The movement also obtained an interim interdict delaying the transfer of the property, after which the provincial government reopened a public participation process before ultimately proceeding with the sale despite widespread public objections.

In 2020, the Western Cape High Court declared the sale unlawful and set it aside. Following the judgment, the purchaser withdrew from the transaction.

In 2024, the Supreme Court of Appeal overturned the High Court's decision, ruling in favour of the provincial government.

In 2026, the Constitutional Court unanimously overturned the Supreme Court of Appeal's judgment, permanently invalidating the 2015 sale. The Court held that the sale had been unlawful and unconstitutional, finding that the provincial and municipal governments had failed to meet their constitutional obligations to advance access to affordable housing and reduce apartheid-era spatial inequality. It also found that the disposal process was procedurally flawed because the public participation process was inadequate and the National Minister of Human Settlements had not been properly consulted.

== Occupations of Cissie Gool House and Ahmed Kathrada House ==
Reclaim The City, along with evicted and unhoused residents of Cape Town's inner city, occupied the unused Woodstock Hospital in March 2017. They turned the property into a housing occupation for hundreds of families. The occupation has been likened to a modern-day commune in the image of the famous Paris Commune of 1871.

Also in March 2017, Reclaim The City spearheaded a second occupation: the former Helen Bowden Nurses Home in the wealthy suburb of Green Point in Cape Town. The property was converted into housing for a few hundred families.

Both occupations have been described as a "tool to hold government to account" and referred to as "the only affordable housing opportunities for poor and working-class people in the metro".
