= Triangle Project =

LGBTQI organisation in South Africa

- Founded: 1981; 45 years ago
- Founded at: South Africa
- Type: Non-governmental organization
- Website: https://triangle.org.za/
- Formerly called: Triangle Project (formerly Gay Association of South Africa)

Triangle Project, formerly the Gay Association of South Africa (GASA) 6010, is one of the largest LGBTQI rights organisations in South Africa.

== Overview ==
It was founded as GASA 6010 in 1981, providing counselling and medical services, and in 1982 it opened a hotline. From 1984 it was involved in the response to the HIV/AIDs crisis in South Africa, and in 1989 the Aids Support and Education Trust (ASET) was founded as part of GASA6010, becoming independent in 1994.

In 1994, the Sex Workers Education and Advocacy Taskforce (SWEAT) was formed as part of the organisation, becoming independent in 1996.

The organisation changed its name to Triangle Project in 1996.

In 2008, the Triangle Project published research indicating that the practice of "corrective rape" is widespread in South Africa, with 86% of black lesbians from the Western Cape saying they lived in fear of sexual assault.

In 2025, South African author Lauren Beukes and British author Jeannette Ng set up "The Genre Creators for Trans Rights Auction", with authors including Olivie Blake, Patrick Rothfuss, Ali Hazelwood and Adrian Tchaikovsky, as well as the estate of Terry Pratchett, donating items. The auction aimed to raise money for the Triangle Project and the UK's Good Law Project to work for trans rights, in the wake of funding pressures on South African queer rights organisations and legal threats to trans people in the UK.
