= Asijiki Coalition for the Decriminalisation of Sex Work =

Trade union in South Africa

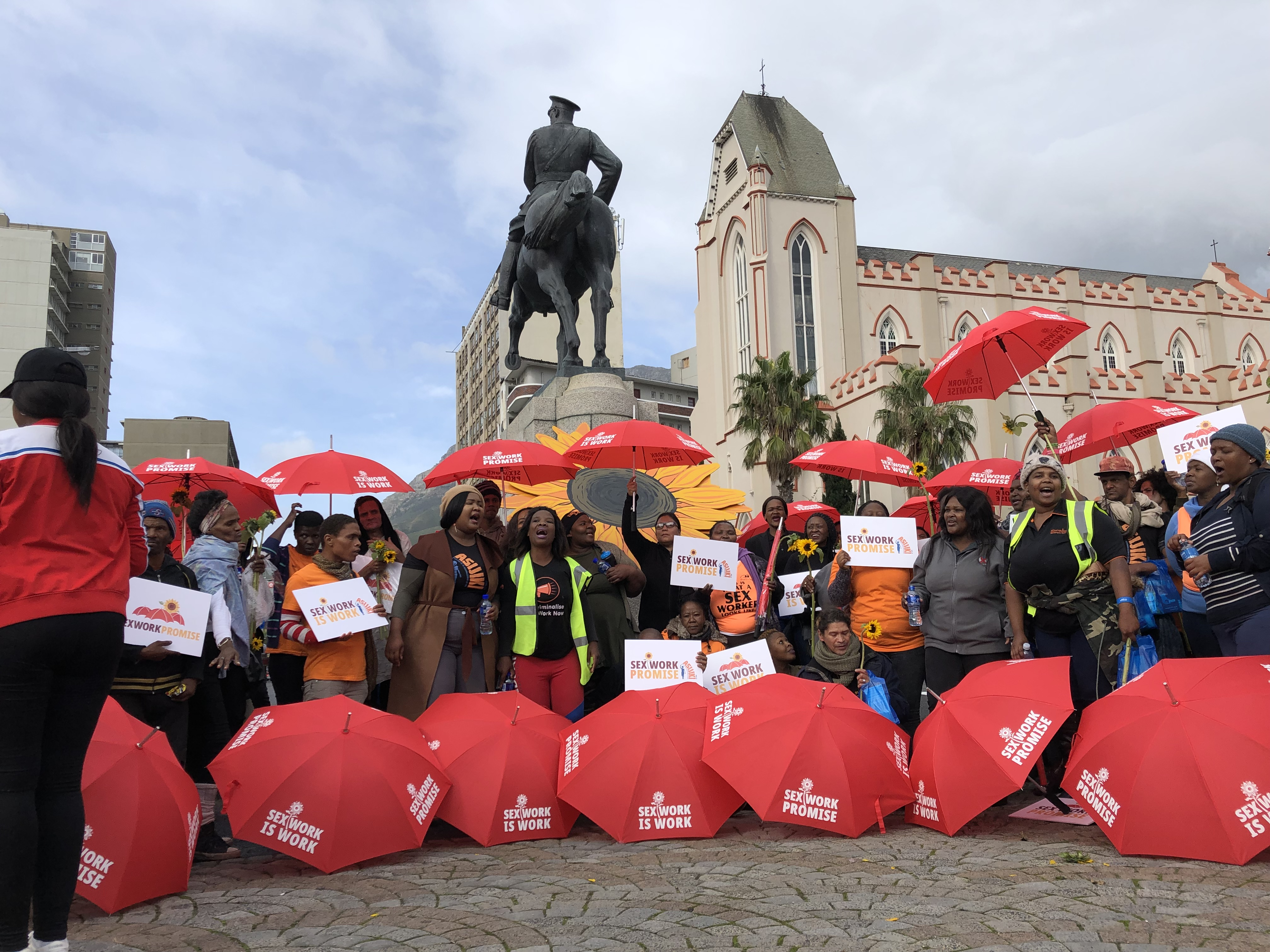
2019 Asijiki Coalition protest in front of the Parliament of South Africa holding red umbrellas and signs saying 'sex work is work'. They thanked President Cyril Ramaphosa for his efforts to decriminalise sex work.

Asijiki Coalition is a South African civil society group advocating for the removal of legal penalties associated with sex work in the country. Established in August 2015, it has over 70 member organisations, including human rights groups, legal professionals, sex workers, and academics.

== Member organisations ==
Asijiki members include Amnesty International South Africa, AIDS Healthcare Foundation, the African Centre for Migration and Society, the Desmond Tutu HIV Foundation, the Commission for Gender Equality, the Congress of South African Trade Unions, Doctors Without Borders (MSF-SA), Legal Resources Centre, UCT Gender Health and Justice Research Unit, the One in Nine Campaign, Oxfam South Africa, Rape Crisis, the Sexual and Reproductive Justice Coalition, and Treatment Action Campaign.

The coalition was formed in an effort to safeguard the human rights of sex workers, and advocate for the full decriminalisation of sex work in South Africa. Several non-governmental organisations in South Africa form the Steering Committee for the Asijiki Coalition, including Sonke Gender Justice, Sex Workers Education and Advocacy Taskforce (SWEAT), Sisonke (National Sex Workers Movement in South Africa), and the Women's Legal Centre.

== History ==
The launch of the Asijiki Coalition in 2015 garnered attention from several news outlets in South Africa. For example, Health24 criticised the 'shameful history' of sex worker murders in South Africa, specifically Cape Town, and voiced support for the Asijiki Coalition's work. In December 2015, individual members of the Asijiki Coalition gave testimony in South Africa's Gauteng Provincial Legislature, listing the difficulties and barriers that they face as a result of the criminalisation of sex work in South African law.

Asijiki Coalition has advocated for sex workers' access to healthcare. It draws attention to the high incidence of murders of sex workers in South Africa, police harassment, assault of sex workers, and other barriers resulting from the criminalisation of sex work. The Asijiki Coalition uses workshops, advocacy, and creative activism to spread awareness of the many issues that affect sex workers. They also advocate for the full decriminalisation of sex work in South Africa. The Coalition has specifically stated that for them, full decriminalisation means the removal of criminal penalties for both sex workers and their clients. This approach can be likened to strategies taken to fully decriminalise prostitution in New Zealand, and is divergent from other solutions, such as the Nordic model. The coalition's name, 'Asijiki' is a Zulu word meaning 'no turning back'.

== Activism ==
In 2018, Asijiki partnered with the Central Methodist Mission on Greenmarket Square in central Cape Town to display a banner reading "Jesus was the first to decriminalise sex work." In 2019, the coalition presented a large sunflower to South Africa's then newly elected President Cyril Ramaphosa to thank him for, and remind him of, commitments he had made to decriminalise sex work in South Africa. Asijiki was also actively involved in placing pressure on South Africa's Department of Justice and Constitutional Development regarding the delay in publishing the final South African Law Reform Commission's report on sex work in South Africa. The Coalition engages with university groups, researchers, Chapter 9 institutions, as well as participating in other forms of activism such as picketing and protest.

=== Asijiki Awards ===
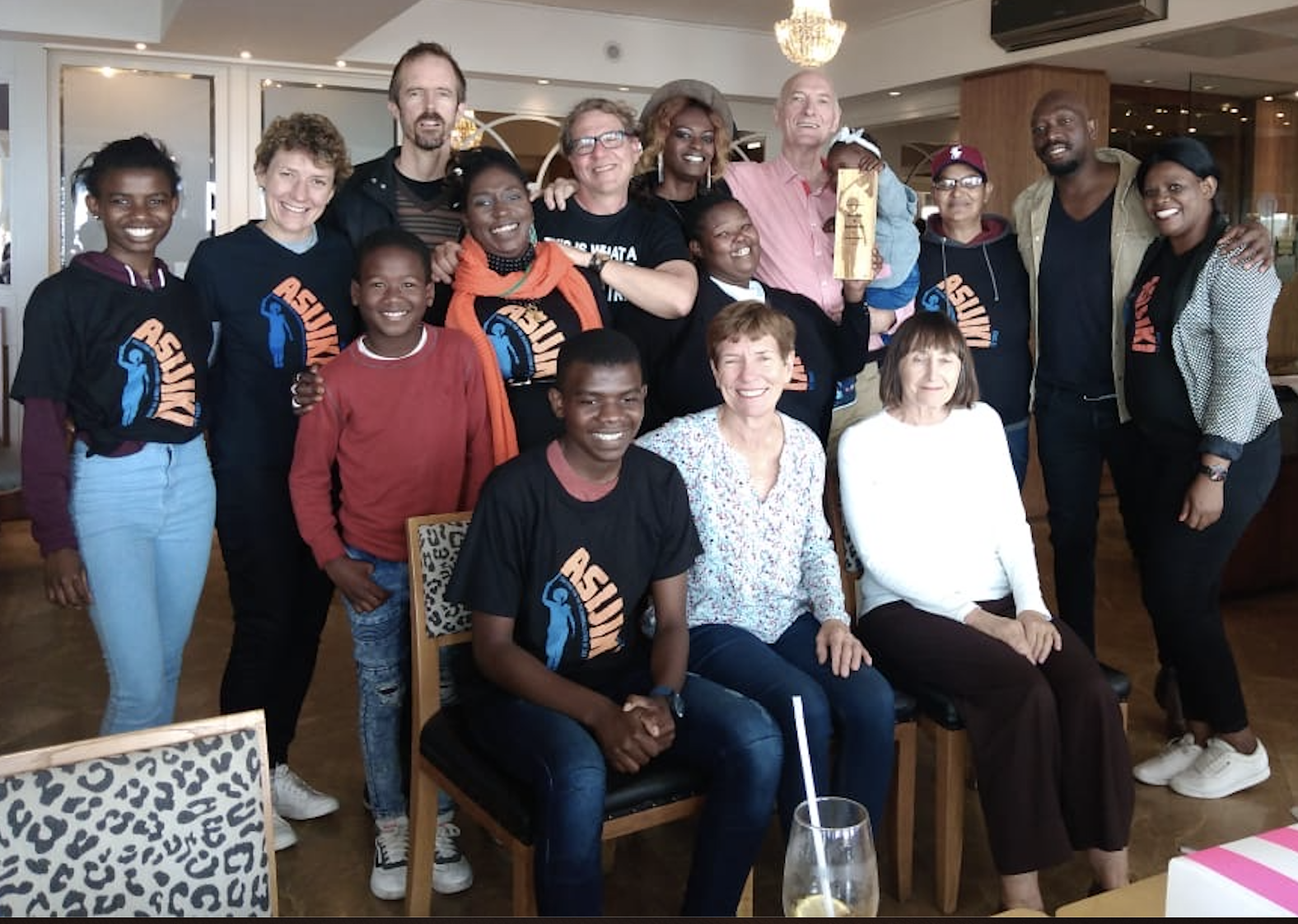
Edwin Cameron Asijiki Award

The Asijiki Coalition presents Asijiki Awards to allies and prominent public figures or organisations that have supported the decriminalisation of sex work in South Africa.

In 2016, the Asijiki Award for Courage & Initiative was presented to Sir Elton John at the XXI International AIDS Conference in Durban.

In 2019, the Asijiki Award for Solidarity & Hard Work was presented to South Africa's #TotalShutdown Movement, and the Asijiki Award for Service & Humanity was presented to retired Constitutional Court Justice Edwin Cameron.

== Gallery ==
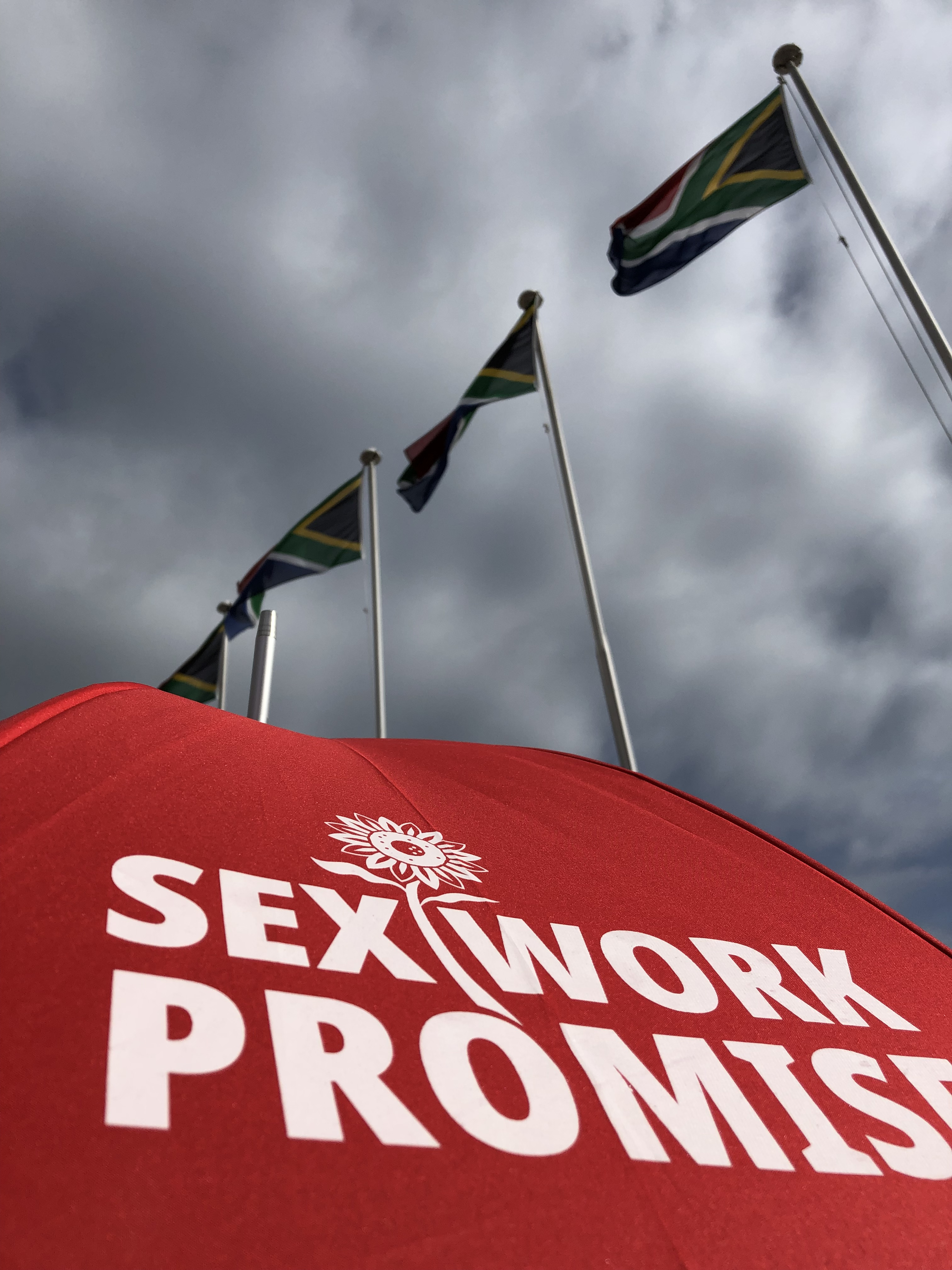
A red umbrella with the words 'sex work promise' on it, against a backdrop of South African flags

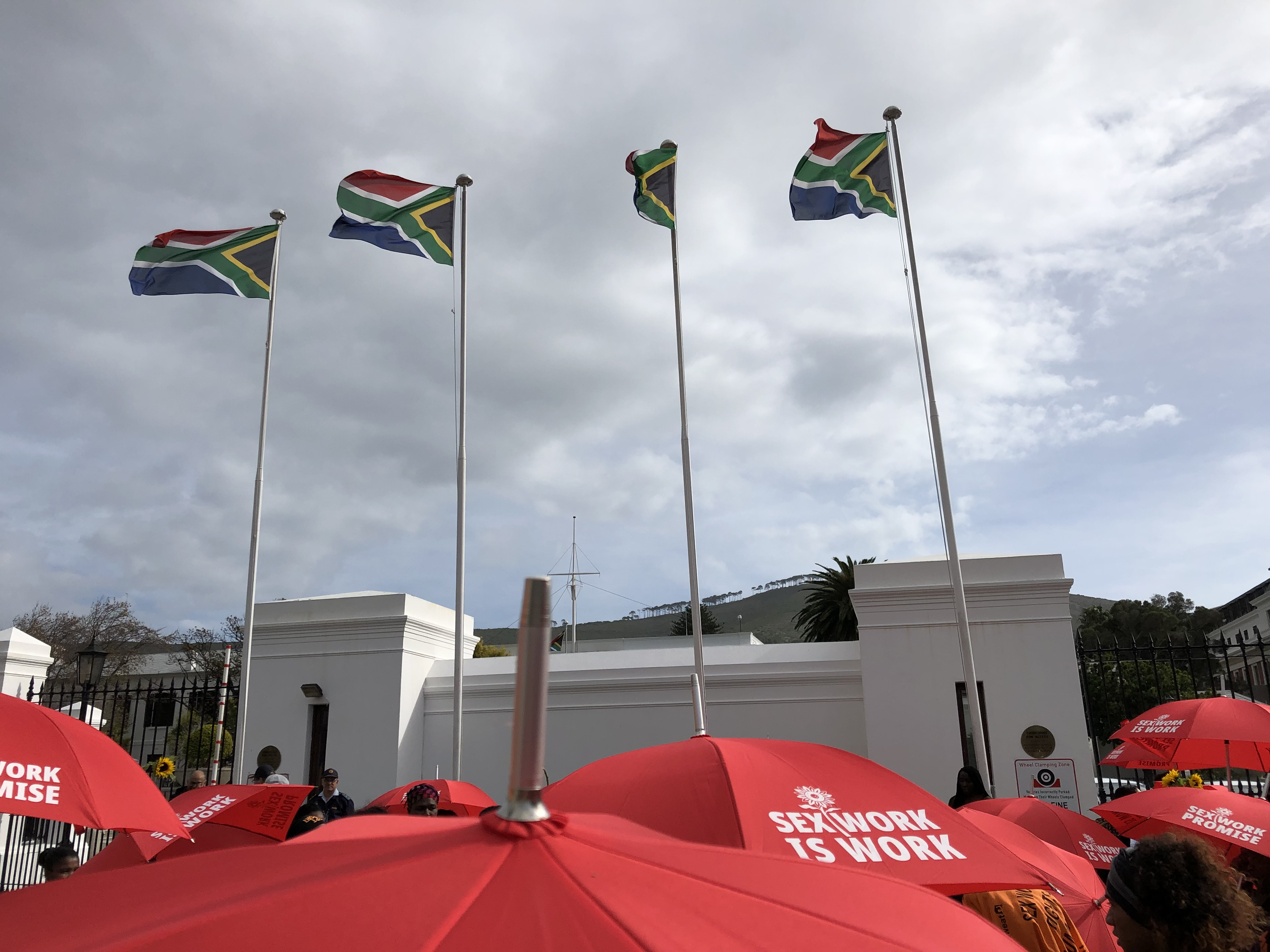
Red umbrellas with "sex work is work" written on them, against the backdrop of the SA flags outside South Africa's Parliament in Cape Town

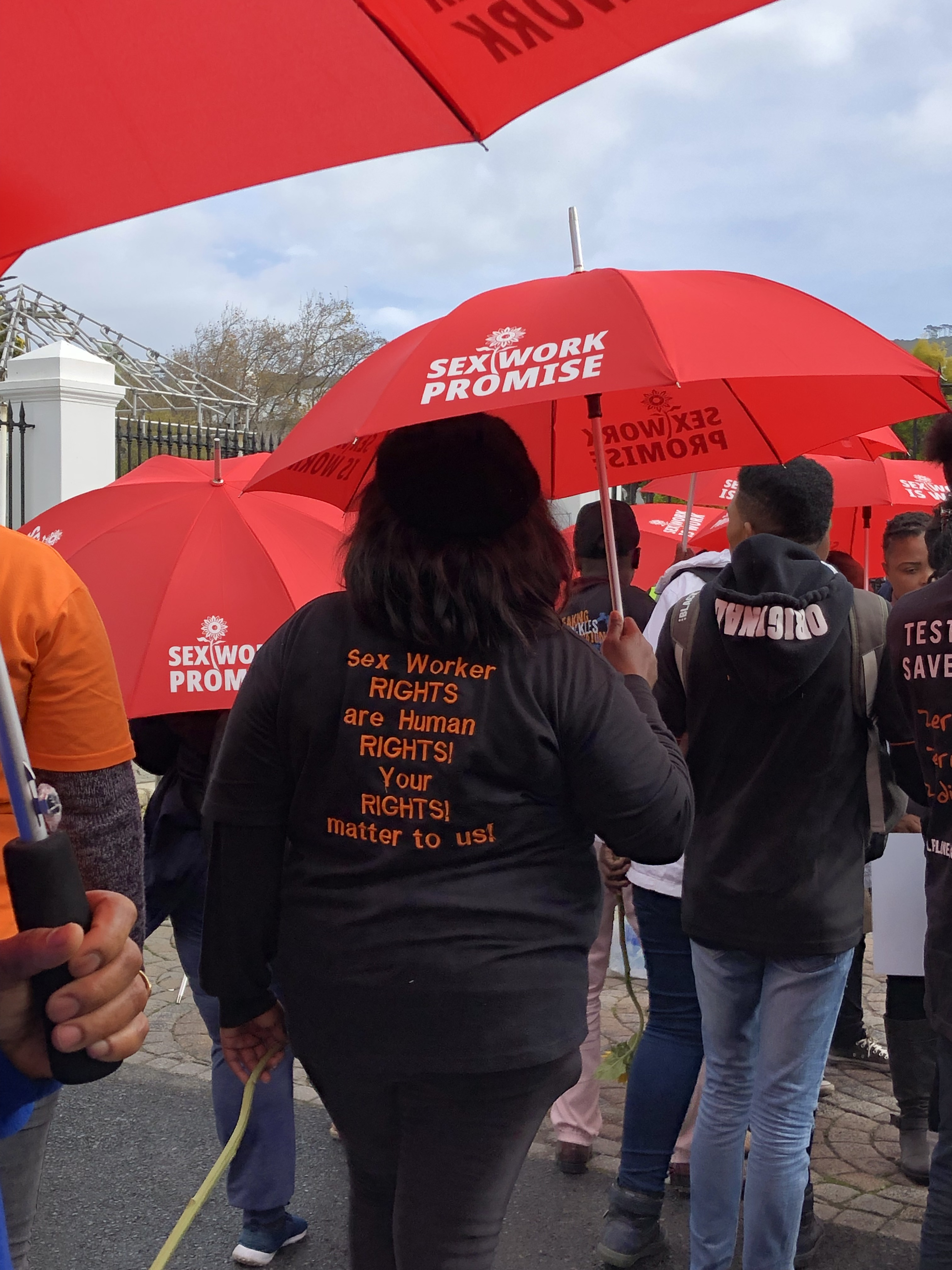
Protestors protesting for the full decriminalisation of sex work in South Africa

== See also ==
- List of sex worker organizations
