= Prostitution in Cape Town, South Africa, during the late Victorian era =

Overview of the legality and practice of prostitution in Victorian South Africa

During the beginning of the late Victorian era in Cape Town, South Africa, prostitution was considered an offense but was rarely prosecuted. The majority of prostitutes during this time were local women of color, though there was a small number of European women partaking in sex work as well. As time progressed, regulations on prostitutes increased under the Contagious Diseases Acts, and Cape Town saw a rise in both European prostitutes and prostitution itself as a result of the Mineral Revolution and the Second Boer War.

== Types of Prostitutes ==
Cape Town prostitutes during the late Victorian era largely fell into four main service categories: dockside prostitutes, independent prostitutes, “sly girls,” and brothel women.

Dockside prostitutes were women who dealt almost exclusively with foreign sailors that stopped at Cape Town's ports. These prostitutes frequented taverns, clubs, and other areas where sailors sought recreation together, and engaged in both sexual and social acts of service to their clients (e.g. talking, drinking, and dancing). Furthermore, due to the international and social nature of their clientele, dockside prostitutes in Cape Town were typically proficient in multiple languages.

Independent prostitutes were generally the poorest of prostitutes in Cape Town. These prostitutes typically lived and operated outdoors, and would take their clients to the beach, parks, or up Table Mountain for commercial sex exchanges.

“Sly girls” were women who had socially acceptable occupations, but supplemented their meager wages by having sex for money on the side. As their sexual exchanges were separate from their publicly recognized work, these “sly girls” often escaped the attention of the authorities.

By the end of the late Victorian era, the majority of prostitutes in Cape Town were brothel women (women who worked in brothels). These women operated indoors, and in some cases faced heavy charges from their brothel keeper for room, board, and the like. By 1901, police reports estimated a total of 200 brothels in operation in Cape Town.

== Victorian Ideological Influence on South African Attitudes towards Prostitution ==
As a British colony at the time, Victorian culture and ideals permeated and influenced the culture and ideals present in Cape Town. Thus, the Victorian emphasis on sexual repression and sexual purification carried over from Britain to the Cape Colony.

In Victorian discourse, women were expected to maintain purity and chastity and suppress any sexual desires they may have. However, with regards to sexuality there existed a double standard between men and women. Like women, men were also expected to maintain some degree of chastity; however, it was widely accepted that men had greater sexual desires than women, and therefore it was socially acceptable - and even encouraged - for them to turn to “less moral” women, like prostitutes, in order to fulfill those sexual desires. Following this logic, prostitution in Cape Town was viewed as a “necessary evil” that protected upstanding women from the “insatiable male appetite”.

Though the idea was widespread, not all agreed with the sexual double standard. Women's groups began organizing to campaign against the sexual double standard and male sexual immorality. In their campaigns, these women's groups characterized prostitutes as victims and targeted sex work as an outlet for immoral male sexual release. The increased attention brought to prostitutes and their male clients resulted in increased moral policing of prostitution in Cape Town, though formal policing at the time remained rather rare.

In addition to transfer of the sexual double standard and its opposition into the Cape Colony, England's social purity movement eventually made its way to South Africa and took off in 1893. In South Africa, issues of temperance and social purity resonated with colonial women, which encouraged the introduction of new regulatory legislation regarding liquor and prostitution. In 1898, the movement saw success in its endeavors to regulate prostitution with the passing of a Police Offences Amendment Act, which penalized pimping and increased the punishment for solicitation.

== The Contagious Diseases Acts ==
=== The Contagious Disease Act of 1868 ===
The prostitution in the Cape Colony became institutionalized and regulated with the passing of the Contagious Diseases Act (CDA) of 1868. Initially, legislation targeting venereal disease in the Cape Colony had seen very little demand among local residents. Instead, pressure for the passing of the CDA came from the British imperial authorities, who were heavily concerned about the spread of venereal disease among their troops stationed in South Africa. The passing of the CDA in 1868 called public attention to the situation of prostitution in Cape Town, and raised concerns about venereal disease contamination from lower social classes to upper social classes.

The CDA of 1868 required the registration of prostitutes and mandated recurring vaginal examinations for venereal disease. If prostitutes were determined to be diseased, they would be admitted to Lock Hospitals for treatment. The Act operated on concepts rooted in the Victorian double standard, and thus identified prostitutes as the source of venereal disease and the regulation of their bodies as the solution to the problem of venereal disease. Enforcement of the CDA was carried out by police, which created a rift of distrust and tension between prostitutes and police.

=== Response to the 1868 Contagious Diseases Act ===
The passing of the 1868 CDA was quickly met with opposition in the Cape Colony; within a year of its passing, an abolition campaign had already begun. Women's groups in Cape Town opposed the bill on the grounds that CDA unfairly blamed prostitutes for the spread of venereal disease and disregarded the role of their male clients, and because they disagreed with the government's regulation of the prostitute's body. Prostitutes strongly pushed back against the act as well, and even rioted on occasion for the humiliation of vaginal examinations and disrespect they experienced at the hands of Lock Hospital doctors.

The first attempt at a repeal was introduced by Dr. George White, a colonist medical doctor, in 1870, but this attempt was unsuccessful. The CDA abolitionist movement only gained traction when Saul Solomon, the proprietor of the Cape Argus, publicized a series of incidents of illegal police misconduct towards prostitutes. Following these publications, the Association for the Repeal of the Contagious Diseases Act was formed, which published an “Appeal to the Public.” In response to the Appeal, colonists from all over the Cape Colony wrote and sent petitions to the House of Assembly demanding the repeal of the CDA, which finally came about in 1872.

=== Reinstatement of the Contagious Diseases Act ===
Although the 1868 CDA had been met with such strong opposition, the discovery of the presence of a growing syphilis epidemic in the Cape Colony created demand for the reinstatement of the Act. Imperial authorities added their voice to the rising public panic over syphilis in the Cape, and the Colonial Medical Committee joined in soon thereafter. This new public demand for regulation of syphilis paved the way for a second CDA to pass swiftly in 1885 with almost no opposition. The CDA of 1885 mandated the registration of prostitutes, and gave authority to district surgeons to place any persons afflicted with venereal disease under medical care. To appease the public and avoid points of contention from the previous Act, the new CDA excluded double examinations unless determined necessary by a magistrate, and addressed police harassment of prostitutes by appointing lay inspectors to retrieve prostitutes in place of policemen. The 1885 CDA was only repealed in the Cape in 1919.

== The Mineral Revolution ==
In the 1880s, the discovery of gold in the Transvaal jump started a mass migration to South Africa. As a port city, Cape Town saw heavy thru-traffic of immigrants, prospectors, and other parties seeking to strike it rich in South Africa, and over the course of the end of the 1800s the city's population doubled. The rapid population increase was disproportionately skewed towards men due to the high number of male immigrants, creating a gender imbalance in Cape Town that opened up great opportunity for profit from prostitution. Thus, many pimps and prostitutes traveled through Cape Town, some settling there permanently.

One primary group that capitalized on the gender imbalance and population growth spurred by the Mineral Revolution was Jewish European pimps, who began trafficking thousands of poor Jewish European women to South Africa. These European women were dubbed “continental women,” and when the Boer government began tightening prostitution laws in 1896, many of these women moved to the coast and became concentrated in port cities like Cape Town. The influx of “continental women” in Cape Town pushed out many of the local prostitutes, and resulted in a professionalism of prostitution in the city. Concerns began to rise amongst Cape Town residents regarding these “continental women,” and they would often receive complaints for drunkenness, profanity, and general misconduct.

== The Second Boer War ==
With the commencement of the Second Boer War in 1899, South African port cities once again saw the arrival of large volumes of people. Cape Town began teeming with upcountry refugees, soldiers, and sailors, creating an ideal environment for pimps and prostitutes to thrive. Criminals also began moving to the coast, following the migration of the wartime population to prey upon refugees who were easy targets for theft. Accordingly, crime rates began rising in Cape Town, and petty crime among prostitutes increased as well. Furthermore, a proliferation of brothels took place as prostitution flourished.

Prior to the Second Boer War, prostitutes in Cape Town had primarily been local women of color, with a small portion of European women. However, with the arrival of large numbers of “continental women” just before the war, Cape Town's rapidly expanding brothels began taking on increasing numbers of European women. Additionally, international trafficking began taking place where girls were traded to South African brothels. The growing presence of white, European women in Cape Town brothels alarmed many among Cape Town's middle class, as many Cape Town residents harbored concerns over miscegenation (the interbreeding of different races) and racial purity. In response to these mounting racial concerns, the Morality Act of 1902, passed in parliament in 1901, was introduced. The Act aimed to slow the spread of brothels, and prohibited sexual intercourse between Black men and white prostitutes.
