= Human trafficking in South Africa =

Human trafficking in South Africa occurs as a practice of forced labour and commercial sexual exploitation among imported and exported trafficked men, women, and children. Generally, South African girls are trafficked for the purposes of commercial sexual exploitation and domestic servitude, while boys are used for street vending, food service, and agriculture. Anecdotal evidence suggests that South African children can also be forced to provide unpaid labor for landowners in return for land occupancy, living accommodation, or for maintaining labor tenancy rights. In any case, this form of unpaid labor has caused human trafficking to be described as a modern form of slavery. Human trafficking is the result of a combination of several factors, including gender inequality, economic instability, and political conflict. Since Africa experiences all of these, it is an active hub for human trafficking. Many urge for the need of a cultural shift to reduce instances of human trafficking by lessening the demand for sex and unpaid labor.

== Terminology ==
Human trafficking refers to the use of force, fraud, or coercion to obtain labor or commercial sexual act, according to the Department of Homeland Security. The definition of human trafficking does not require that victims be transported. They can remain stationary and still be classified as victims of human trafficking if they are being sexually exploited or serving as indentured laborers.

A sex exploiter is any person who expresses desire or engages in sex with at least one victim of human trafficking.

Debt bondage refers to a form of indentured servitude where payment is given to a person's legal guardian/family member(s) in exchange for said person. They must work to pay off this debt for release.

Kidnapping is the taking of a person to another place against their will, or the restraint of a person's freedom by force, as defined the Wex Legal Dictionary.

Abduction is the taking of a child from their legal guardian with the specific intention of defiling or prostituting the child, according to the Wex Legal Dictionary.

An origin country is one where traffickers recruit victims for exploitation.

A transit country is an intermediary country where a victim is moved to after recruitment. These countries often have ineffective border control and corrupt government officials.

A destination country is one that receives victims. Its economy is generally prosperous enough to support sex trafficking.

An internal/domestic country is one whose victims are both recruited and trafficked within the same country.

== Victim demographics ==
It is estimated that there are millions of victims; though only about 50–100,000 cases are found each year. The University of Johannesburg reports that trafficking occurs at a slightly higher rate for girls than boys, with 55.5% of all trafficked people in South Africa being female, and 44.5% being male. It is estimated that more than three-quarters of all victims are between the ages of 12–25. Though many victims are recruited through deceit on behalf of the trafficker, sometimes victims of human trafficking enter on their own accord, as they are faced with economic hardships that leave them desperate for a better life. This can occur as agentic victims are coerced by employers or pimps to become a trafficked person for a number of false benefits such as better pay, for example. The uneven distribution of wealth in South Africa leaves victims vulnerable to promises of wealth.

There are first wave victims, classified as people recruited for trafficking, and second wave victims, such as women who were trafficked and now serve as recruiters. Traffickers have learned to find victims in places where there is little to no protection for exploitation, weak government, poverty, corrupt law enforcement, temporary working positions, and places where diaspora is common. Many traffickers convince their victims to fear the police, as they are not to be trusted, which helps to keep victims trapped in the cycle of trafficking.

=== Driving forces of trafficking ===
Traffickers can range from people who engage in activity occasionally to those who are a part of organized crime networks, according to the International Organization for Migration. It is often easier for traffickers to work in the latter situation because it facilitates the movement and organization of victims.

Following the apartheid of South Africa during the 20th century, inequality increased as the higher classes held most of the state's income. This exacerbated the tendency for women in Africa to not be in positions of power, as it is difficult for many to obtain education and skills training. This makes women easy targets for traffickers. Many agree to go abroad with prospects of a better life. Traffickers also seek children from Africa due to a lack of a birth registration system. This leaves children vulnerable to trafficking because they are unidentified and difficult to trace back to their country or origin. These victims are then transported to South Africa. Ukuthwala (child marriage) is a tradition common in some South African provinces wherein young girls are married to older men, which may also account for some trafficking victims.

== Case study ==
One hospital in Durban, South Africa pleaded guilty to 109 counts of illegal organ transplants, wherein Brazilian and Romanian victims were compensated as little as $6,000 for organs worth anywhere from $100,000–120,000. This is a violation of the South African Human Tissue Act of 1983 that protects minors from being used for organ transplant and the sale of organs for profit. South Africa is a prominent place for organ harvesting because the exchange rate between South African currency and United States dollars allows recipients a maximum payout. Additionally, South Africa has only 2% of the population on the organ transplant registry, and many qualified doctors willing to perform the transplant.

== Trafficking routes ==
Trafficking rings choose transit locations where government officials and police are corrupt, leaving traffickers with little risk of being caught and victims with little hope of being helped.

Child sex tourism is prevalent in and between a number of South African cities, notably the cities of Johannesburg and Cape Town. Women and girls from other African countries are often imported to South Africa for commercial sexual exploitation, domestic servitude, and other jobs in the service sector. Occasionally, these women are taken as far as Europe for sexual exploitation. Many Thai, Chinese, and European women are often trafficked to and sexually exploited in South Africa for debt bondage. Young men and boys from Mozambique, Zimbabwe, and Malawi are notably trafficked to South Africa for farm work, extending for months without pay before "employers" have them arrested and deported as illegal immigrants. Organized criminal groups—including Nigerian, Chinese, and Eastern European syndicates, local gangs and individual policemen facilitate trafficking into and within South Africa, particularly for the purpose of commercial sexual exploitation.

South African victims are usually taken to Ireland, the United States, and the Middle East as domestic servants. Victims from several different countries such as Thailand, the Philippines, China, and Russia are trafficked into South Africa. Because of this, South Africa is considered an origin, transit, destination, and internal/domestic country in terms of child trafficking.

== Protection and prevention ==
There is an absence of reliable statistics about human trafficking, masking the truth about human trafficking in South Africa. Since such little is known, it is difficult to assess and combat the situation. The United States passed the Prevention and Combatting of Trafficking in Persons Act in 2013, which the former president of South Africa Jacob Zuma signed. However, little change was affected and only 3 traffickers were convicted, and 12 suspects were prosecuted that same year.

In 2008, South Africa was placed on the US Department of State's Tier 2 list, which designates it as a country whose government does not currently comply with TVPA's minimum standards against human trafficking, but is making efforts toward compliance. The government provided inadequate data on investigations or prosecutions of trafficking crimes or on resulting convictions or sentences. In addition, it did not provide information on its efforts to protect victims of trafficking and continued to deport and prosecute suspected foreign victims without providing appropriate protective services. The U.S. State Department's Office to Monitor and Combat Trafficking in Persons placed the country in "Tier 2" once again in 2017.

Failure to address trafficking is perhaps due to poor screening procedures and identification measures. Many traffickers evade persecution because there is no law that criminalizes human trafficking. The South African Penal Code lacks criminal codes that specifically outline human trafficking, instead grouping incidents into crimes like rape, sexual assault, and abduction. This lack of systematic data collection makes it difficult to record incidents of human trafficking and take measures against it.

To help reduce instances of human trafficking, the South African Department of Home Affairs began requiring an Unabridged Birth Certificate in 2015 for minors travelling in and out of South Africa. An Unabridged Birth Certificate contains information about the child's legal guardians, if a child entering/exiting South Africa does not have a UBC, they are denied passage. The implementation of this policy, however, may not reduce trafficking, as traffickers tend to use illegitimate ways of crossing the border or victims may be trafficked within borders.

South Africa also partnered with the Global Action against Trafficking in Persons and Smuggling of Migrants in 2016. South Africa was one of 13 countries asked to join this effort due to the prevalence of human trafficking. A Trafficking in Persons Task Team was established in 2012 by the National Prosecuting Authority's Sexual Offenses and Community Affairs Unit (SOCA). This task team works toward collecting data on trafficking in South Africa and taking measures to reducing incidences. The Child Protection Directorate helps survivors of trafficking return safely to their parents or guardians.
