= Prostitution in Mozambique =

Prostitution in Mozambique is legal and widely practiced, and the country also contains illegal brothels. The majority of the population remains below the poverty line, a situation which provides fertile soil for the development of prostitution. In Mozambique, as in many poor countries, the government is responsible for monitoring sex workers, and data on the number of prostitutes in Mozambique is not available. UNAIDS estimate there to be 13,554 prostitutes in the country.

== History ==
At the time of independence in 1975, Mozambique was one of the poorest countries in the world. The position of residents worsened during the civil war years 1977–1992. The arrival of peacekeepers operating under the auspices of the UN resulted in an increase in the prostitution industry. In 1992, prostitution in Mozambique had reached such proportions that the post of mediator was created between the military on the one hand and pimps and prostitutes on the other. The problem of prostitution in Mozambique came under international discussion for the first time in the mid 1990s, when the deputy head of the UN mission Behrouz Sadri accused UN peacekeepers of buying sex from underage prostitutes.

== Statistics of child prostitution ==
Research into child prostitution carried out in Maputo and published in 2001 indicated that 98% of child prostitutes were girls, 26% were aged 10-14 years, and 14.1% attended school. Of those not attending school, 69% had dropped out of school due to lack of funds, 12% had reached the second year of primary school, and 7.4% had attended high school.

== Sex trafficking ==
Human trafficking in Mozambique is a significant problem. Mozambique is a source country for people trafficked for forced prostitution. Research in 2003 indicated that Mozambican girls and young women between the ages of 14 and 24 were typically being recruited. The main destination was South Africa, where they were put into sexual slavery and compelled to work in prostitution. It was estimated that around 1,000 women were being recruited, transported and exploited in this way each year. To a much lesser extent Mozambique is also itself a destination for human trafficking. Women and girls from Zimbabwe and Malawi who voluntarily migrate to Mozambique are manipulated by traffickers into forced prostitution.

The United States Department of State Office to Monitor and Combat Trafficking in Persons ranks Mozambique as a 'Tier 2' country.
