= Eswatini AIDS Support Organisation =

The Eswatini AIDS Support Organisation is the first organized group of people living with HIV in Eswatini, established in 1993 under the auspices of The AIDS Information Center (TASC). Its mandate is to bring hope through positive living.

The Organization headquarters is at Lamvelase Help Center in Manzini, then have regional offices at Ekutfokomeni SOS Children's Village and at Hlathikhulu next to Social Welfare offices.
