= Sex Workers Education and Advocacy Taskforce =

African sex workers' rights organization

SWEAT
- Sex Workers Education and Advocacy Taskforce
- Founded: 1994; 32 years ago
- Founded at: South Africa
- Type: Non-governmental Organization
- Region served: Southern Africa
- Website: https://sweat.org.za/

Sex Workers Education and Advocacy Taskforce (SWEAT) is a South African sex workers' rights organization. It is the first such organization to be established in Southern Africa, and is renowned as the most prominent sex worker movement on the continent, according to scholars.

SWEAT's work primarily focuses on organizing, advocating for and delivering services to South African sex workers. The organization supports the decriminalization of sex work. SWEAT are affiliated with the transgender sex worker support group SistaazHood.

== History ==
SWEAT was founded in November 1994 in Cape Town, South Africa by Shane Petzer (a male sex worker) and Ilse Pauw (clinical psychologist). Initially associated with the Triangle Project, a South African LGBTQ+ rights organization, SWEAT's advocates recognized the need for a human rights approach to provide services and assistance to sex workers, leading to their separation in 1996.

During a SWEAT conference held in Cape Town in 2003, Sisonke, a sex worker-led movement, was established in response to the lack of sex worker leadership in SWEAT. Sisonke's members work to empower and educate sex workers, while advocating for policy and legal reforms that promote the health, safety, and human rights of sex workers in South Africa. SWEAT remains supportive of Sisonke and other sex worker-led organizations by providing health and human rights training to promote sex worker's rights in South Africa.

== Programs ==
SWEAT has helped sex workers gain access to services such as healthcare, legal assistance, counseling, and training programs, as well as engaging in advocacy efforts to promote sex worker's rights, including advocating for policy and legal reforms that safeguard their health and human rights.

== Notable work ==
SWEAT won an interdict on high court in Cape Town prohibiting the arrest of sex workers for an ulterior purpose.

== Research ==
SWEAT have carried out a number of research projects:

- Violence against sex workers 1996
- Policing Sex Workers/Violence against Sex workers 1996/2004
- Demographic Survey 2005
- Coping with Stigma/Health Care Gaps 2005
- Selling Sex in Cape Town 2008
- Outdoor organisational assessment 2010
- Monitoring of human rights violations 2010
- Indoor sector research 2010
