= Farmer =

Person engaged in agriculture, raising living organisms for food or raw materials

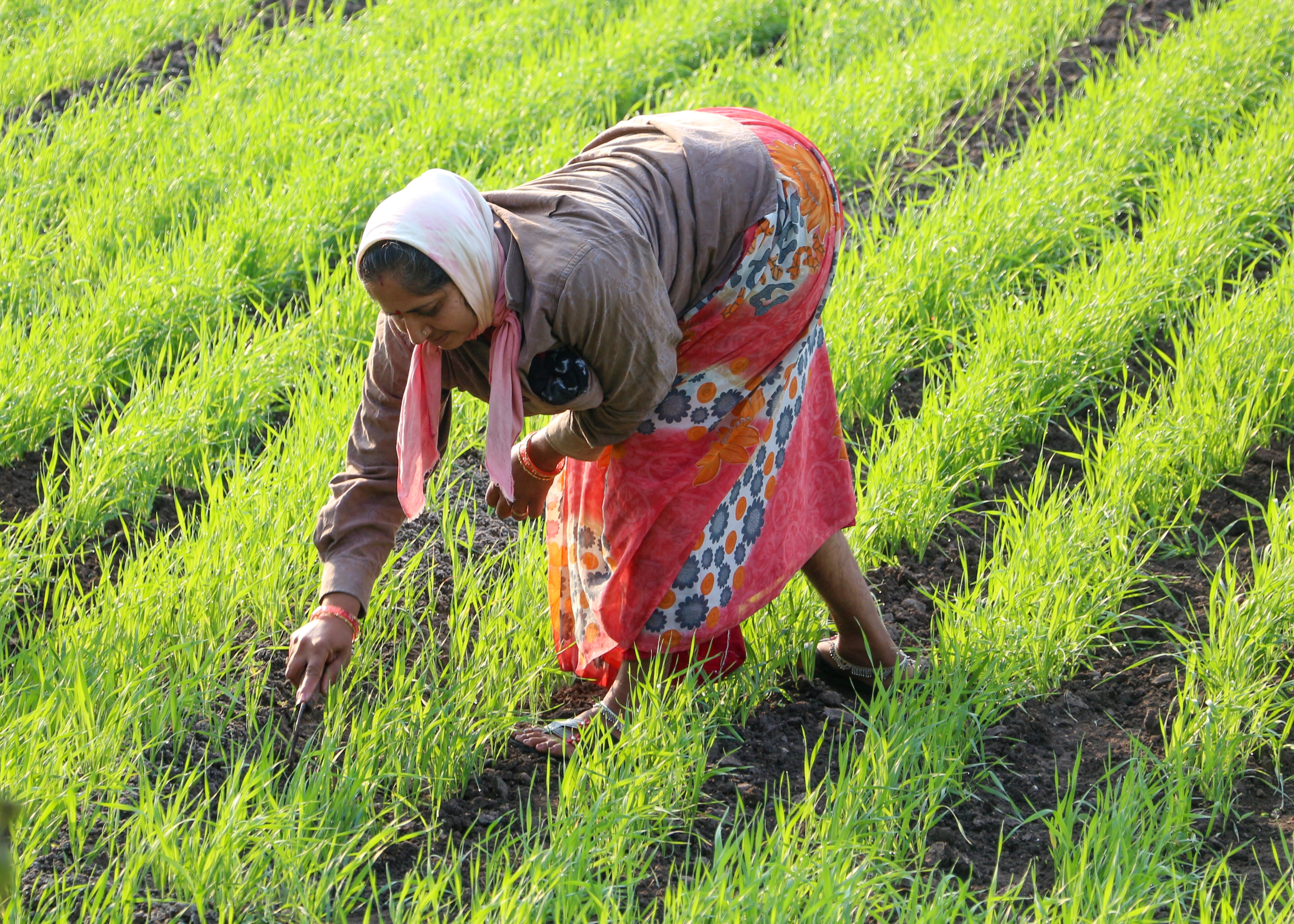
- Woman working in a rice field near Junagadh, Gujarat, India, in 2013

Occupation
- Occupation type: Employment
- Activity sectors: Agriculture

Description
- Fields of employment: Farm, agribusiness
- Related jobs: Rancher (U.S.), grazier (Australia) or stockman

A farmer is a person engaged in agriculture, raising living organisms for food or raw materials. The term usually applies to people who do some combination of raising field crops, orchards, vineyards, poultry, or other livestock. A farmer might own the farmland or might work as a laborer on land owned by others. In most developed economies, a "farmer" is usually a farm owner (landowner), while employees of the farm are known as farm workers (or farmhands). However, in other older definitions a farmer was a person who promotes or improves the growth of plants, land, or crops or raises animals (as livestock or fish) by labor and attention.

Over half a billion farmers are smallholders, most of whom are in developing countries and who economically support almost two billion people. Globally, women constitute more than 40% of agricultural employees.

== History ==
Farming dates back as far as the Neolithic, being one of the defining characteristics of that era. By the Bronze Age, the Sumerians had an agriculture specialized labor force by 5000–4000 BCE, and heavily depended on irrigation to grow crops. They relied on three-person teams when harvesting in the spring. The Ancient Egypt farmers farmed and relied and irrigated their water from the Nile.

Animal husbandry, the practice of rearing animals specifically for farming purposes, has existed for thousands of years. Dogs were domesticated in East Asia about 15,000 years ago. Goats and sheep were domesticated around 8000 BCE in Asia. Swine or pigs were domesticated by 7000 BCE in the Middle East and China. The earliest evidence of horse domestication dates to around 4000 BCE.

=== Advancements in technology ===
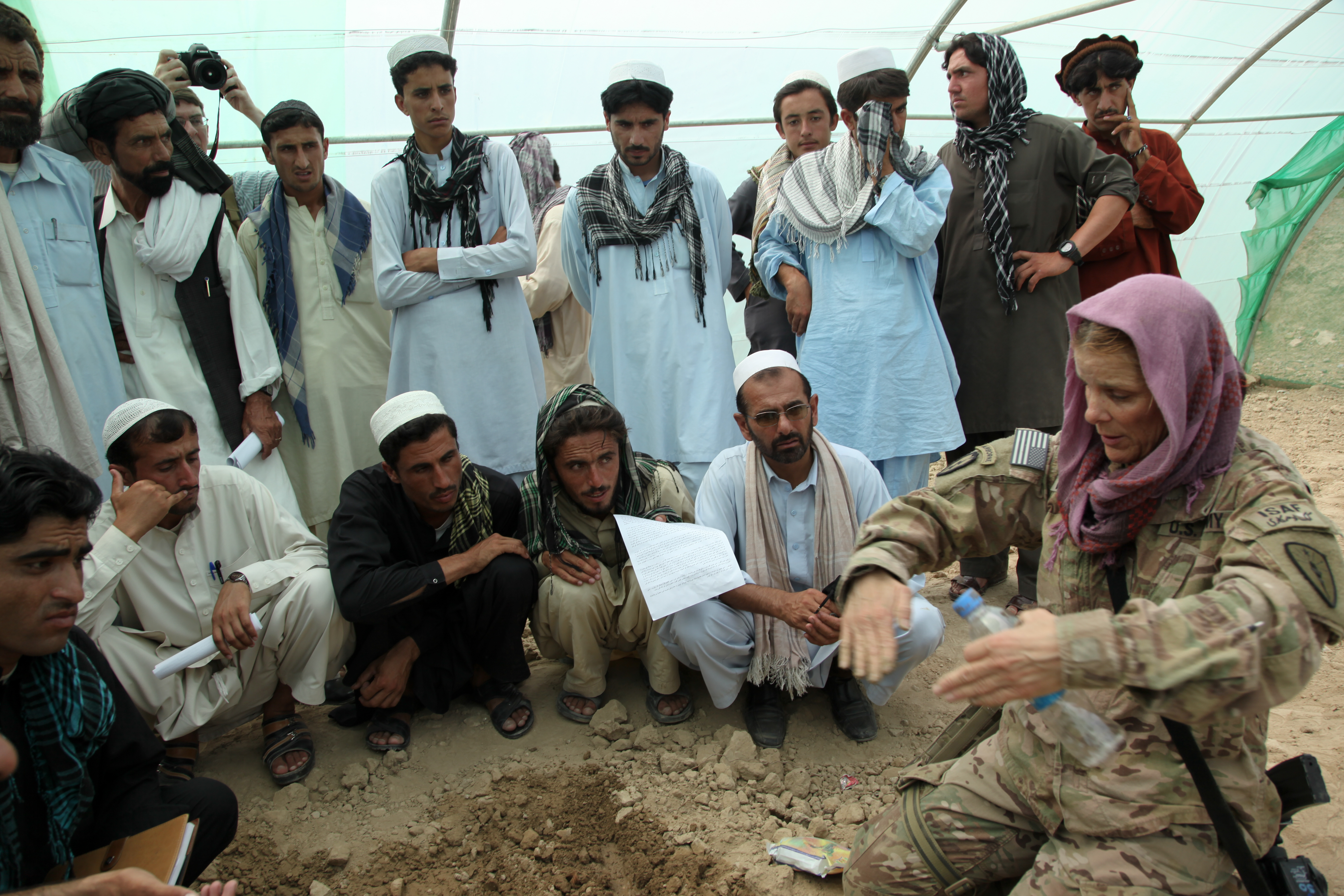
Afghani farmers learning about greenhouses

In the US of the 1930s, one farmer could produce only enough food to feed three other consumers. A modern farmer produces enough food to feed well over a hundred people. However, some authors consider this estimate to be flawed, as it does not take into account that farming requires energy and many other resources which have to be provided by additional workers, so that the ratio of people fed to farmers is actually smaller than 100 to 1.

== Types ==
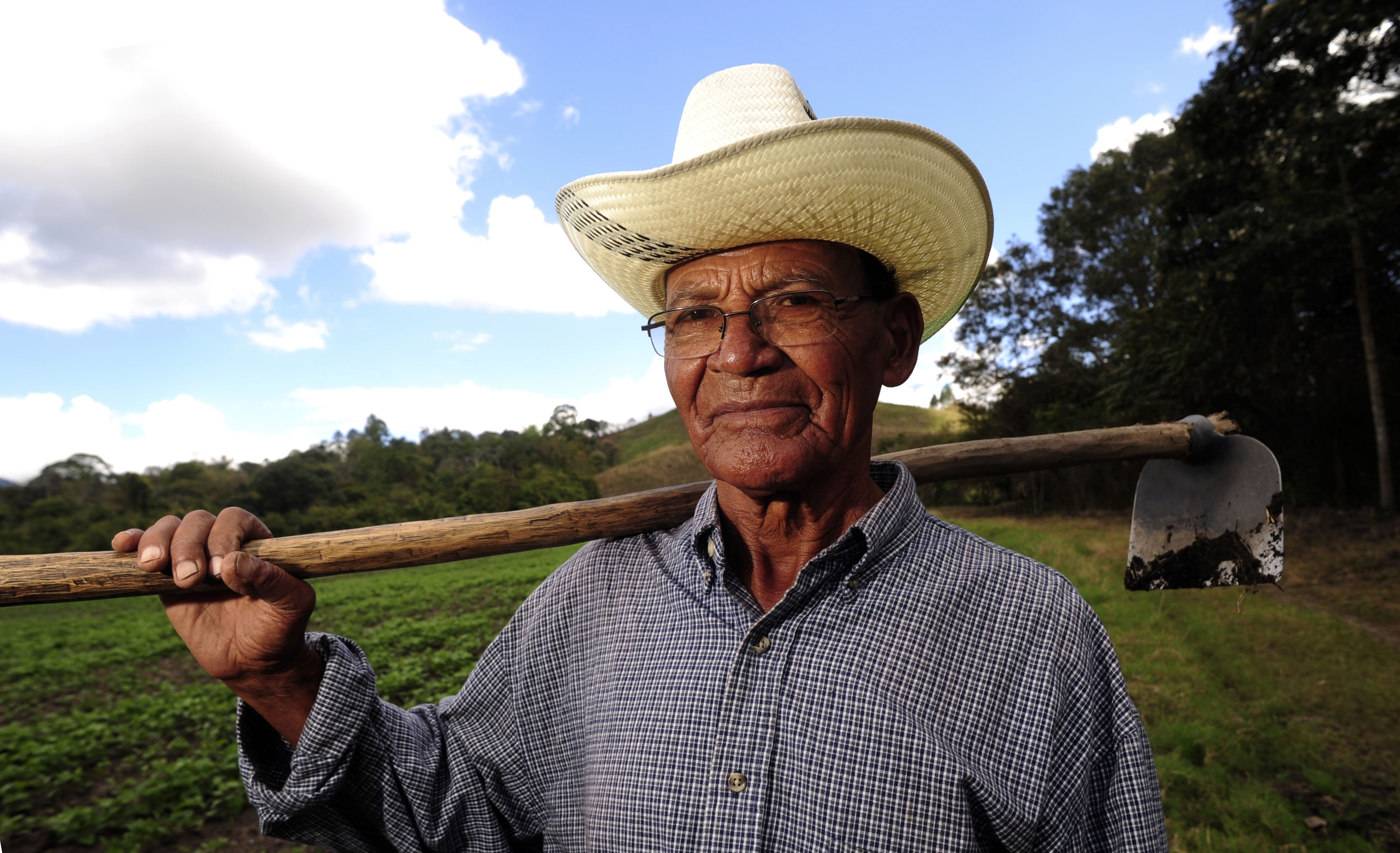
A farmer in Nicaragua

More distinct terms are commonly used to denote farmers who raise specific domesticated animals. For example, those who raise grazing livestock, such as cattle, sheep, goats and horses, are known as ranchers (U.S.), graziers (Australia & UK) or simply stockmen. Sheep, goat and cattle farmers might also be referred to, respectively, as shepherds, goatherds and cowherds. The term dairy farmer is applied to those engaged primarily in milk production, whether from cattle, goats, sheep, or other milk producing animals. A poultry farmer is one who concentrates on raising chickens, turkeys, ducks or geese, for either meat, egg or feather production, or commonly, all three. A person who raises a variety of vegetables for market may be called a truck farmer or market gardener. Dirt farmer is an American colloquial term for a practical farmer, or one who farms his own land.

In developed nations, a farmer (as a profession) is usually defined as someone with an ownership interest in crops or livestock, and who provides land or management in their production. Those who provide only labor are most often called farmhands. Alternatively, growers who manage farmland for an absentee landowner, sharing the harvest (or its profits) are known as sharecroppers or sharefarmers. In the context of agribusiness, a farmer is defined broadly, and thus many individuals not necessarily engaged in full-time farming can nonetheless legally qualify under agricultural policy for various subsidies, incentives, and tax deductions.

=== Techniques ===
In the context of developing nations or other pre-industrial cultures, most farmers practice a meager subsistence agriculture—a simple organic-farming system employing crop rotation, seed saving, slash and burn, or other techniques to maximize efficiency while meeting the needs of the household or community. One subsisting in this way may become labelled as a peasant, often associated disparagingly with a "peasant mentality".

In developed nations, however, a person using such techniques on small patches of land might be called a gardener and be considered a hobbyist. Alternatively, one might be driven into such practices by poverty or, ironically—against the background of large-scale agribusiness—might become an organic farmer growing for discerning/faddish consumers in the local food market.

== Farming organizations ==
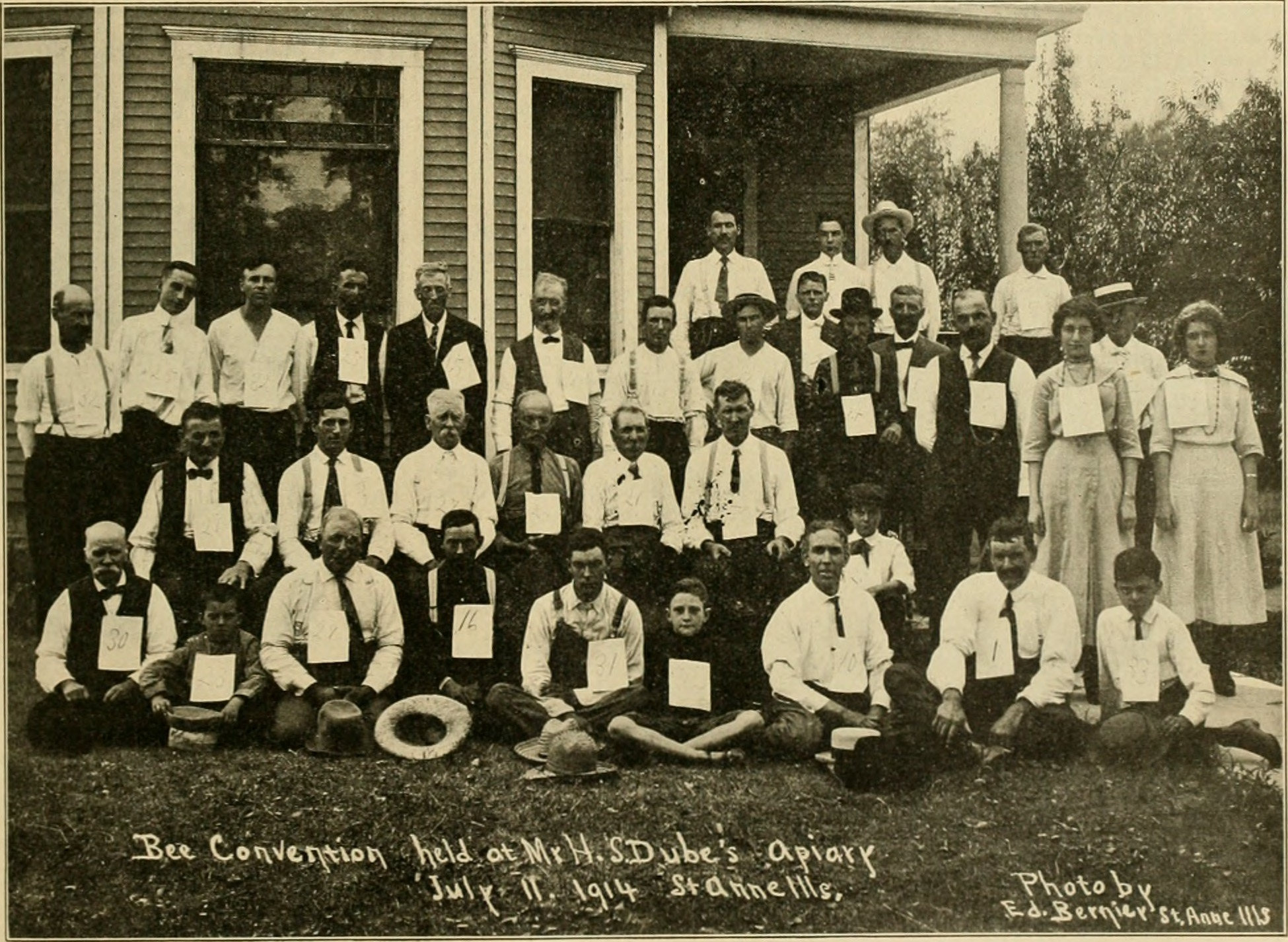
Meeting of the Eastern Illinois Beekeepers Association, 1914

Farmers are often members of local, regional, or national farmers' unions or agricultural producers' organizations and can exert significant political influence. The Grange movement in the United States was effective in advancing farmers' agendas, especially against railroad and agribusiness interests early in the 20th century. The FNSEA is very politically active in France, especially pertaining to genetically modified food. Agricultural producers, both small and large, are represented globally by the International Federation of Agricultural Producers (IFAP), representing over 600 million farmers through 120 national farmers' unions in 79 countries.

=== Youth farming organizations ===
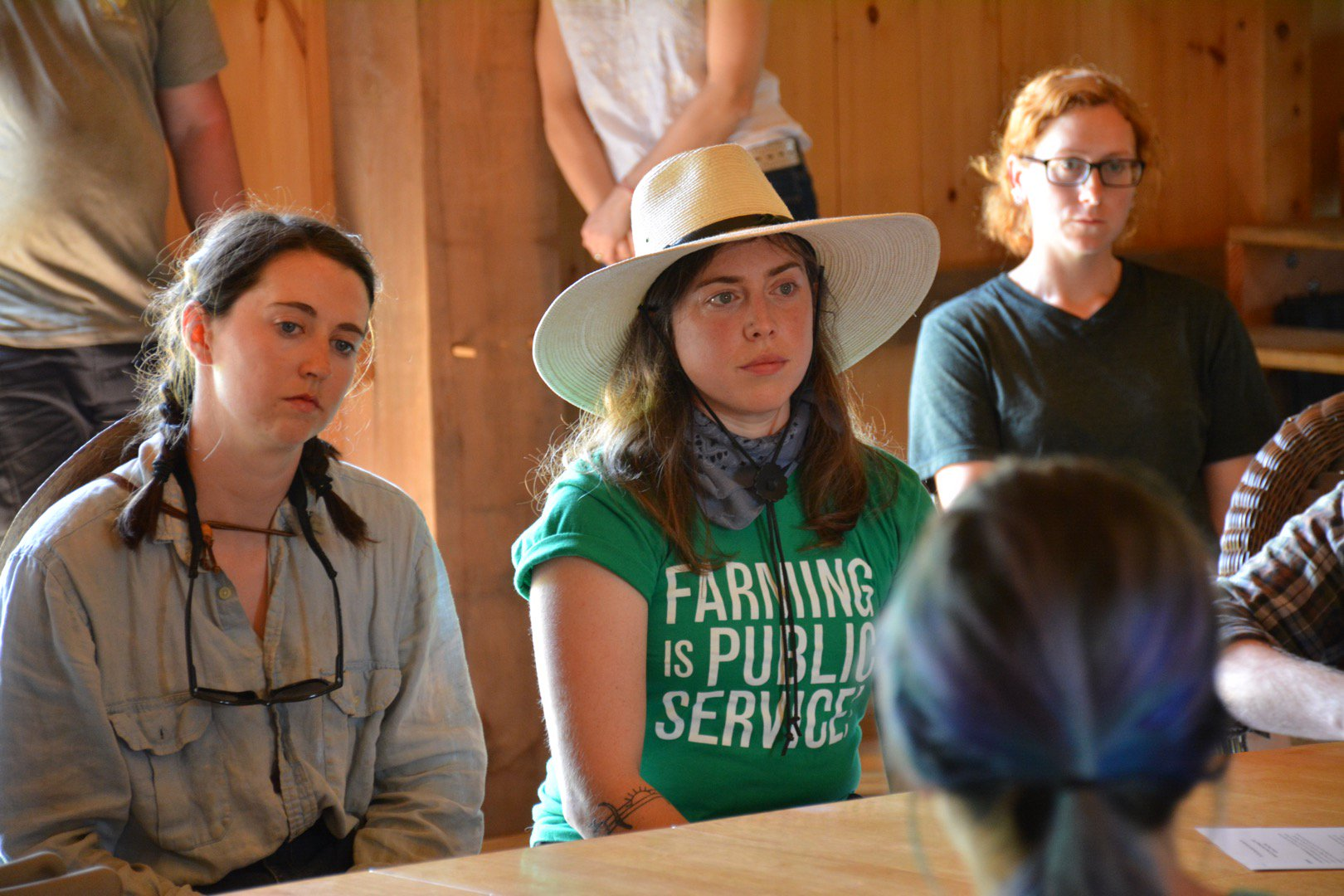
'Farming is a public service' shirt

There are many organizations that are targeted at teaching young people how to farm and advancing the knowledge and benefits of sustainable agriculture.

- 4-H was started in 1902 and is a U.S.-based network that has approximately 6.5 million members, ages 5 to 21 years old, and is administered by the National Institute of Food and Agriculture of the United States Department of Agriculture (USDA).
- The National FFA Organization (formerly known as Future Farmers of America) was founded in 1925 and is specifically focused on providing agriculture education for middle and high school students.
- Rural Youth Europe is a non-governmental organization for European youths to create awareness of rural environmental and agriculture issues, it was started in 1957 and the headquarters is in Helsinki, Finland. The group is active in 17 countries with over 500,000 participants.

== Income ==
Annual changes in prices received by farmers, top and bottom countries in 2022

Farmed products might be sold either to a market, in a farmers' market, or directly from a farm. In a subsistence economy, farm products might to some extent be either consumed by the farmer's family or pooled by the community.

== Occupational hazards ==
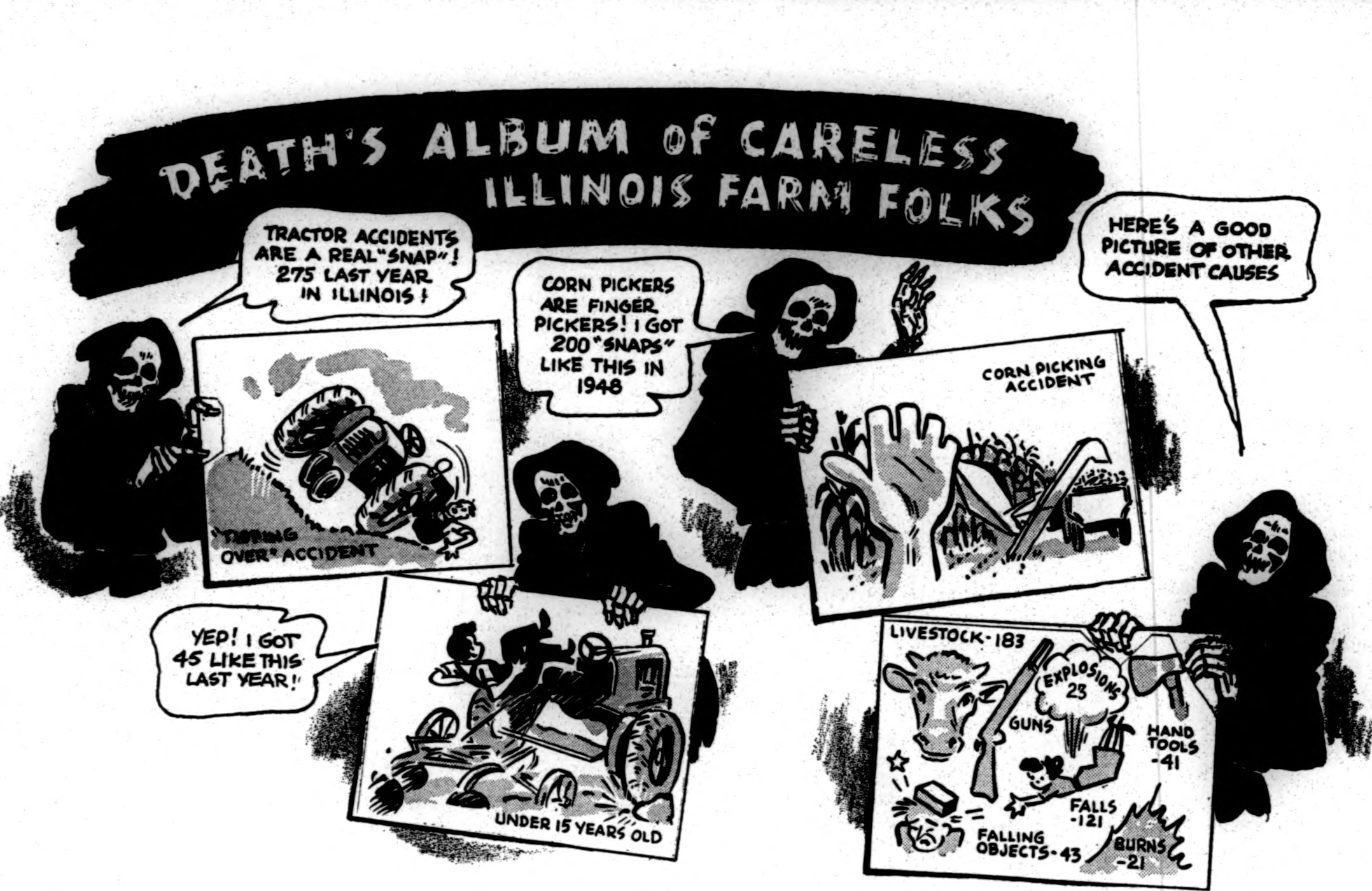
"Death's Album of Careless Illinois Farm Folks", a 1949 cartoon listing 275 tractor-related accidents the previous year, and 183 livestock-related incidents

There are several occupational hazards for those in agriculture; farming is a particularly dangerous industry. Farmers can encounter and be stung or bitten by dangerous insects and other arthropods, including scorpions, fire ants, bees, wasps and hornets. Farmers also work around heavy machinery which can kill or injure them. Farmers can also establish muscle and joints pains from repeated work. Farmers also faces unique mental stressors, like the stress of uncertain crop yield based on weather events and uncertain economic stability due to market fluctuations. In the US, farmers are 3.5 times more likely to die by suicide than the general US population.

== Etymology ==
The word 'farmer' originally meant a person collecting taxes from tenants working a field owned by a landlord. The word changed to refer to the person farming the field. Previous names for a farmer were churl and husbandman.

== Gallery ==
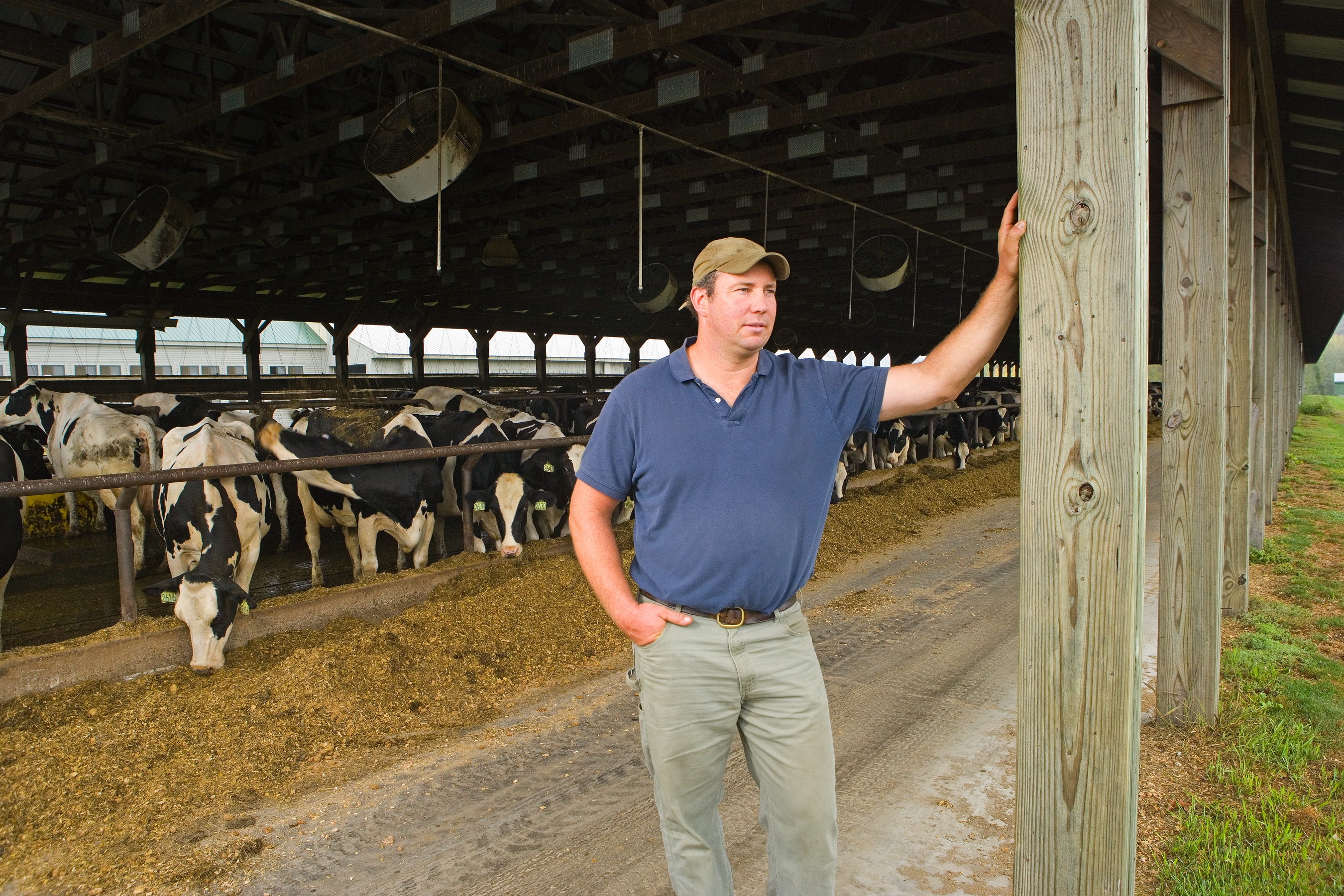
American dairy farmer

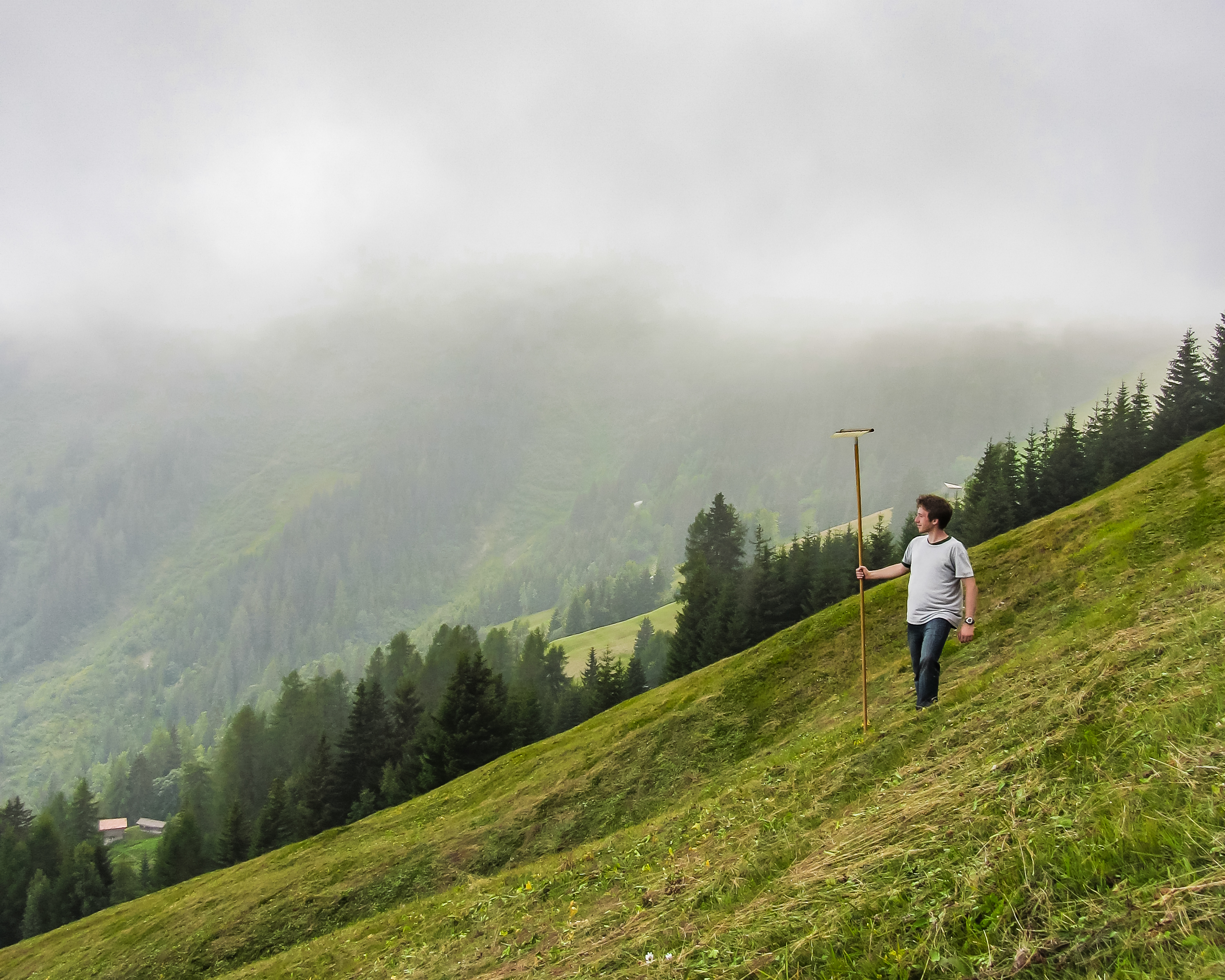
Swiss hay farmer

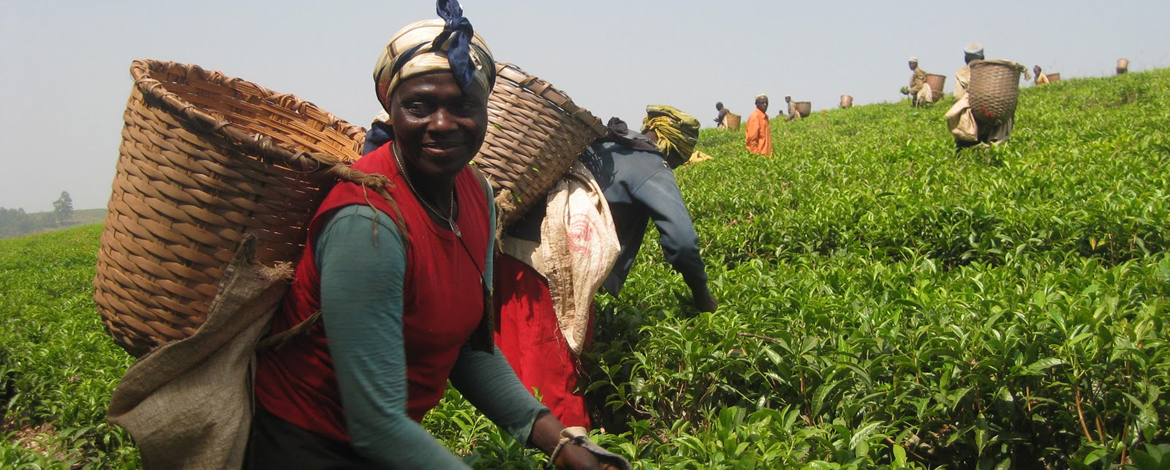
Tanzanian tea farmers

== See also ==
- Agrarian society
- Agrarianism
- Agriculture
- Agribusiness
- Agroecology
- Corporate farming
- Family farm
- Farmers' market
- Farmworker
- Gardening
- Gentleman farmer
- Landed gentry
- Organic farming
- Pastoralism
- Peasant
- Rural American history
- Sustainable agriculture
