= Buffalo Boy =

Buffalo Boy may refer to:

- The Buffalo Boy, a 2004 Vietnamese film directed by Minh Nguyen-Vo
- Buffalo Boy, a series of fashion spreads evolved by Ray Petrie and others
- Buffalo Boy (also translated as Cowherd), the male protagonist of the Chinese story "The Cowherd and the Weaver Girl"

== See also ==
- Cowherd (disambiguation)
