= Peasant mentality =

The concept of peasant mentality constitutes a widespread traditional characterisation of peasantry, often a disparaging one.

Peasants as a class predominated numerically in most agricultural societies from the time when the Neolithic agricultural revolution took hold until the early modern period. But rulers, movers and shakers tended to come from different social classes, and historiography and social analysis became the preserve of a largely non-peasant social intelligentsia. "Official" attitudes to peasants sometimes scorn them and dismiss their importance as the basis of pre-modern civilisations. Hence the cliché of "the peasant mentality, with its inherent conservatism and apathy towards change".

Richard Stites paints a brighter picture of (for example) Russian peasantry pre-1917:

There certainly was no single peasant mentality ..., but several modes of thought can be identified as peasant, folk, or popular utopia. The peasant village was a world, a system of action, an arena of play, and a unit of moral obligation. Inside the unit, equity, fairness, and charity were supposed to prevail; equality referred to a clear belief that natural resources (water, woodlands, game, meadows) ought to be free for the use of all.

Traces may intrude here of the idealised alternative view of peasant life, fostered by art and literature as a contrast to urban corruption. The romantic pastoral image of peasant existence, dating from at least Hesiod and continuing through Virgil and Rousseau to the concept of the sturdy yeoman, would have peasant mentality as simple, yet genuine, emotional and loving, and idealised as bucolic.

== See also ==
- Colonial mentality
