= Cowherd =

Cowherd is a surname. Notable people with the surname include:

- Colin Cowherd (born 1964), American sports radio host
- Kevin Cowherd, American author, humorist and former newspaper columnist
- Leonard Cowherd, American soldier killed in the Iraq War, one of the subjects of the documentary Last Letters Home
- Thomas Cowherd (1817–1907), Canadian tinsmith and poet who helped telephone inventor Alexander Graham Bel
- William Cowherd (1763–1816), English clergyman
- William S. Cowherd (1860–1915), American mayor of Kansas City and U.S. congressman for Missouri

== See also ==
- The Cowherd, the male protagonist of the Chinese story "The Cowherd and the Weaver Girl"
- Cowboy, an American who herds cattle on horseback
- Cowman (profession) in the UK, akin to ranch hand or dairy worker in North America
- Stockman (Australia), who works with cattle
