= Protected areas of Eswatini =

Protected areas of Eswatini include any geographical area protected for a specific use inside the landlocked country of Eswatini, in southern Africa.

Within Eswatini there is a mix of national, private and community-owned protected areas. They include national parks, nature reserves, wildlife sanctuaries and game reserves.

== National parks ==
- Hlane Royal National Park

== Wildlife sanctuaries ==
- Mlilwane Wildlife Sanctuary

== Game reserves ==
- Mbuluzi Game Reserve
- Dombeya Game Reserve
- Mkhaya Game Reserve

== Nature reserves ==
- Hawane Nature Reserve
- Malolotja Nature Reserve
- Mantenga Nature Reserve
- Mlawula Nature Reserve
- Phophonyane Falls Nature Reserve
- Shewula Community Nature Reserve
- Simunye Nature Reserve

== Other protected areas ==
- Bulembu National Landscape
- Hlane
- Makhonjwa National Landscape
- Mbuluzi
- Mhlosinga
- Mkhaya
- Mlilwane
- Muti Muti
- Phophonyane
- Nisela (private, unproclaimed)
- Nkhalashane Siza Ranch
- Sondeza National Landscape

== Eswatini's involvement with various transfrontier parks ==
- Lubombo Conservancy, as part of the Lubombo Transfrontier Conservation Area
- Nsubane Pongola Transfrontier Conservation Area
- Songimvelo-Malolotja Transfrontier Conservation Area
- Usuthu-Tembe-Futi Transfrontier Conservation Area, incorporating Usuthu Gorge

== Lubombo Conservancy ==
Situated in the Lubombo District, the conservancy is part of the Lubombo Transfrontier Conservation Area, which straddles the border between South Africa's KwaZulu-Natal province, southern Mozambique and the northeastern part of Eswatini. It includes the Hlane Royal National Park, the Mlawula Nature Reserve, the Shewula Community Nature Reserve, the Mbuluzi Game Reserve, the Nkhalashane Siza Ranch and the Inyoni Yami Swaziland Irrigation Scheme (IYSIS). It is Eswatini's largest conservancy area.
