= Lubombo Conservancy-Goba Transfrontier Conservation Area =

Lubombo Conservancy-Goba Transfrontier Conservation Area is a joint project between Mozambique and Swaziland, based on the Peace Park agreements, which was signed on 22 June 2000.

The park will include the following areas:

- Goba Conservancy (Mozambique)
- Goba Communial Land (Mozambique)
- Mlawula Game Reserve (Swaziland)
- Hlane Royal National Park (Swaziland)
- Mbuluzi Game Reserve (private property)
- Nkhalashane Ranch (government-owned)
- Shewula Community Nature Reserve

It is expected that this TFCA will eventually be included into the: Greater Lubombo Transfrontier Conservation Area.

== See also ==
- Protected areas of South Africa
- List of conservation areas of Mozambique
- Protected areas of Swaziland
