= List of National Monuments of Eswatini =

The National Monuments of Eswatini, in Southern Africa, are proclaimed in accordance with the National Trust Commission Act, 1972. The same act saw the establishment of the Swaziland National Trust Commission. The Commission, a parastatal of the Ministry of Tourism and Environmental Affairs, is charged with the protection and promotion of the country's cultural heritage. As of May 2012, three National Monuments have been proclaimed with a number of candidate sites for future proclamation under examination. Swaziland ratified the UNESCO World Heritage Convention in 2006; the Ngwenya Mines have been submitted for inscription and are currently on the Tentative List.

== List of National Monuments ==
Three National Monuments have been proclaimed under the current system:

Site	Location	Date	Comments	Coordinates	Image
Mantojolo Pool	outside Mbabane		sacred to Mnisis clan		
Tree under which King Bhunu was investigated	Manzini	1898	"murder enquiry" for killing a chief		
Site of Captain Gilson's House	Mbabane		first Police Commissioner's House; companion of Sobhuza II		

== List of potential National Monuments ==
A further twenty-nine sites have been identified as potential National Monuments:

Site	Location	Date	Comments	Coordinates	Image
Allister Miller's House	Mbabane				
Mbabane Well, old bus rank	Mbabane				
Deputy Prime Minister's Offices and neighbouring building					
Commandant's Residence (at Zakhele)	Manzini		oldest building in Manzini		
Second Legco Building, Mbabane Magistrate's Court	Mbabane				
Notting Hill Mine Battery	near Piggs Peak				
Phophonyane Water Wheel					
Swaziland National Office					
Mahamba Church			oldest church in Swaziland		
Lamgangeni's Burial Site					
Prince Fanyana Memorial Library	Kwaluseni				
Mabuda Estates farm house	Siteki				
Khambi's stone	Entfonjeni				
Lion Cavern	Malolotja		early mine		
Sibebe Rock	Mbuluzi River valley				
Emgwayiza	Malolotja		Afromontane forest, green chert		
Mehluko Hill			old fortress		
Manzamnyama Falls near Zombodze II (site of Royal ceremony)					
Mahamba Gorge					
Disused gold mines		c.1880-1920s	including Piggs Peak mine		
Caves used by Swazi during wars					
Great Usuthu (Lusuthu) Gorge	between Sidvokodvo and Siphofaneni				
Sites of the oldest Royal Residences	Shiselweni District				
Stone-built remains of Sotho-speaking clans					
Endzeleni	Ngwemphisi Valley		rock formations		
"Oldest farm house"					
Balekane Mountain Fortress					
Khubuta Mines					
Von Steinacher's fort	Groenpan near Siteki				

== See also ==
- History of Swaziland
- List of heritage registers
- UNESCO General History of Africa
