= Eswatini National Trust Commission =

National trust in Eswatini

The Eswatini National Trust Commission (ENTC; formerly Swaziland National Trust Commission) is the custodian of Eswatini's cultural and natural heritage. It is governed by The National Trust Commission Act of 1972. It is a parastatal of the Ministry of Tourism and Environmental Affairs.

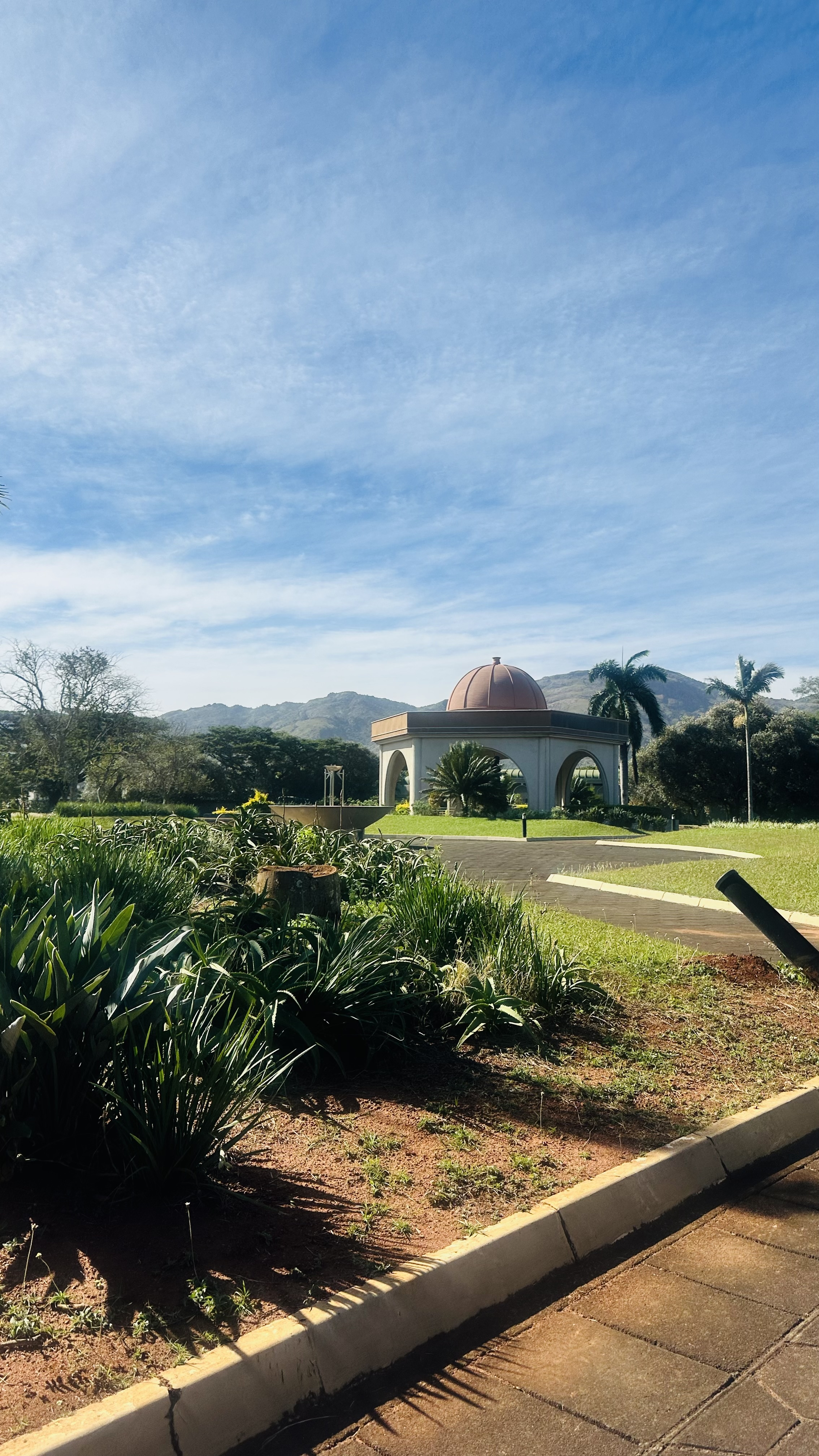
A view of the King Sobhuza 11 Memorial Park, Lobamba. This is one of the entities under the ENTC.

== Nature ==
It is responsible for Hawane Nature Reserve, Malolotja Nature Reserve, Mantenga Nature Reserve and Mlawula Nature Reserve.

== Culture ==
It operates the Swaziland National Museum and Mantenga Swazi Cultural Village.

== National Monuments ==
Three sites have been proclaimed National Monuments and a number of further sites are being investigated with a view to future proclamation.
