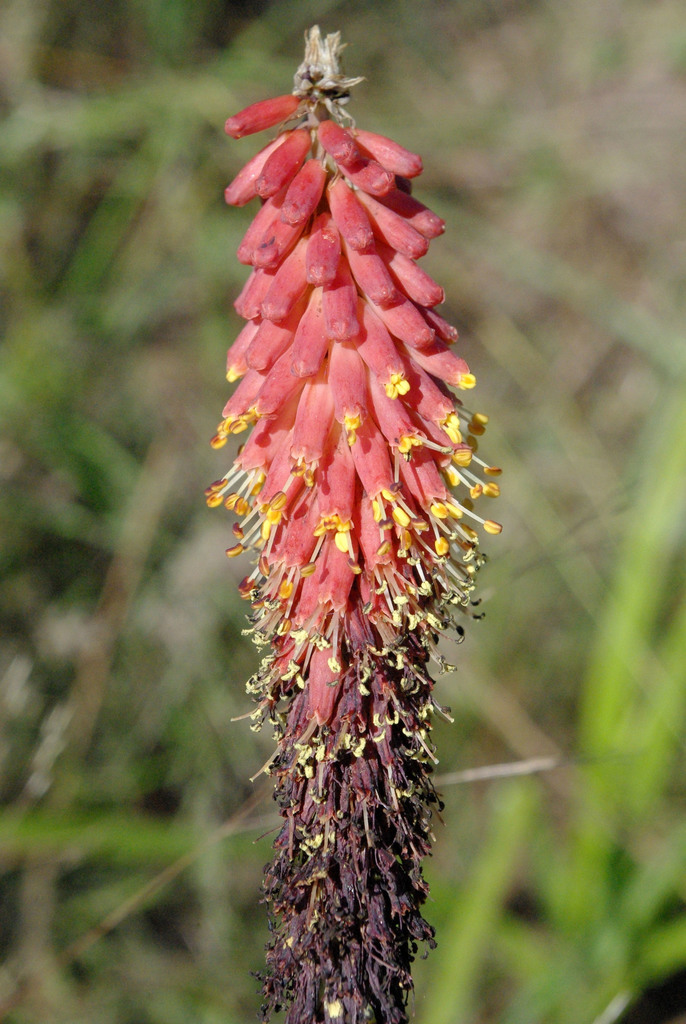
- Kniphofia umbrina inflorescence, Hhohho Region, Eswatini

Conservation status
- Critically Endangered (IUCN 3.1)

Scientific classification
- Kingdom: Plantae
- Clade: Embryophytes
- Clade: Tracheophytes
- Clade: Angiosperms
- Clade: Monocots
- Order: Asparagales
- Family: Asphodelaceae
- Subfamily: Asphodeloideae
- Genus: Kniphofia
- Species: K. umbrina

Binomial name
- Kniphofia umbrina Codd

= Kniphofia umbrina =

Species of flowering plant

Kniphofia umbrina, called the Eswati poker, is a species of flowering plant in the genus Kniphofia. The species is native to an area near Forbes Reef in Eswatini, just to the north of Mbabane.

== Description ==
Plants are herbaceous perennials which may grow up to 1.8 metres (5.9 ft) tall. Stems emerge from a thick rhizome, with 6–8 leaves per stem. Flowers are brown, slightly scented, and form a raceme. It is similar in characteristics to Kniphofia typhoides.

== Habitat ==
The species is native to sourveld, rocky grassland in a temperate climate. Soils in the area are acidic, high in clay and organic matter, and serpentiferous. Their observed distribution covers approximately 40 square kilometres (15 mi^{2}). The habitat falls on Swazi Nation Land, as well as on the Hawane Nature Reserve.

== Conservation ==
The species was first listed by the IUCN as vulnerable in 1978 after a detailed survey. There were between 3,000 and 4,000 estimated individuals. The population was initially threatened by maize cultivation and road construction. Conservation measures were undertaken, including translocating individuals into Malolotja Nature Reserve and collecting seeds. The population of 1,900 transplants eventually went extinct.

Between 1978 and 1985, the population declined 92%, down to only 357 known plants. This was attributed to increased pressure by grazing, agriculture, and the construction of a dam. In 2001, the species was reassessed as critically endangered.
