= Lubombo Transfrontier Conservation Area =

Conservation area in KwaZulu-Natal, Mozambique and Swaziland

Coordinates: 26.25°S 31.88°E

The Lubombo Transfrontier Conservation Area was born out of the Peace Park Foundation’s vision to establish a network of transfrontier conservation areas in southern Africa. It straddles the border between South Africa’s KwaZulu-Natal province, southern Mozambique, and Eswatini.

== Overview ==
The Lubombo Transfrontier Conservation Area covers 4,195 km^{2} (1,620 mi^{2}), of which 2,783 km^{2} (1,075 mi^{2}) (66%) is in Mozambique, 1,095 km^{2} (423 mi^{2}) (26%) is in South Africa, and 317 km^{2} (122 mi^{2}) (8%) is in Eswatini. It is situated on a low-lying coastal plain between the Lebombo Mountains in the west and the Indian Ocean in the east. The area offers a unique combination of big-game country, extensive wetlands, and beautiful undeveloped coastal areas. It links the Maputo Elephant Reserve in Mozambique through the Futi Corridor and the Lubombo Conservancy in Eswatini to the Tembe Elephant Park in South Africa, creating the first major elephant stronghold along Africa's eastern coastline.

== Maputo Elephant Reserve ==
Now known as Maputo Special Reserve (or Reserva Especial de Maputo in Portuguese), this 1,040 km^{2} (400 mi^{2}) reserve is situated in the southernmost part of Mozambique, 79 km (49 mi) south of Maputo, in the province of Maputo. It is bounded on the east by the Indian Ocean, and on the west by the Rio Maputo.

In 1975, before the Mozambican Civil War, vast numbers of wildlife including 65 southern white rhinoceros were relocated from Umfolozi Game Reserve in Kwazulu Natal, South Africa. Sadly, no rhinos and only some 200 elephants survived the 14-year war.

The elephant reserve is now threatened by industrial development.

On 18 July 2012, Macauhub News Agency reported that a public tender will be issued for selection of the company that will carry out the studies of the economic feasibility of building a deep water port an Techobanine.

The Mozambique Transport and Communications Minister, Paulo Zucula, said the master plan for the project had recently been completed, and that the proposal was due to be presented soon to the Council of Ministers. The port complex is expected to cover an area of 300 km^{2} (120 sq mi), and will have an additional area of 110 km^{2} (42 sq mi) for industrial development, as well as capacity to process 200 million tons of cargo.

The Techobanine region is 70 km (43 mi) from Maputo and 20 km (12 mi) north of Ponta do Ouro.

== Tembe Elephant Park ==
Tembe Elephant Park is situated in Maputaland, in the north-eastern region of KwaZulu-Natal, South Africa adjoining the Mozambique border. It is home to the province's biggest African elephant herd and its only indigenous elephants. Tembe's 300 square kilometres (120 mi^{2}) comprises a variety of unique sand forest, woodland, grassland and swampland habitats.

== The Greater St. Lucia Wetland Park ==
The Greater St Lucia Wetland Park in the Ponta do Ouro-Kosi Bay Transfrontier Conservation Area (TFCA) was proclaimed a UNESCO World Heritage Site in November 1999. The site is the largest estuarine system in Africa and includes the southernmost extension of coral reefs on the continent. Efforts are ongoing to extend the existing World Heritage Site northwards to encompass the Mozambican section of the TFCA, which includes a marine protected area.

== Lubombo Conservancy ==
Situated in the north eastern part of Eswatini in the Lubombo Region. This protected 600 square kilometres (230 mi^{2}) area includes the Hlane Royal National Park, the Mlawula Nature Reserve, the Shewula Community Nature Reserve, the Mbuluzi Game Reserve the Nkhalashane Siza Ranch and the Inyoni Yami Swaziland Irrigation Scheme, (also known as the IYSIS).

== See also ==
- Protected areas of South Africa
- List of conservation areas of Mozambique
- Protected areas of Eswatini
- Usuthu-Tembe-Futi Transfrontier Conservation Area
