= Nsubane Pongola Transfrontier Conservation Area =

Proposed protected area in South Africa and Swaziland

Nsubane Pongola Transfrontier Conservation Area is a proposed protected area, that could potentially become a joint venture between South Africa and Eswatini. The concept includes the following properties:

In South Africa:

- Phongolo Nature Reserve
- Harloo Game Ranch
- Shayamoya
- Pongolapoort Dam
- Pongola Game Reserve North
- Pongola Game Reserve South

In Eswatini:

- Mkhulameni (Government Farm)
- G Scheepers (Farm)
- W Bennett (Farm)
- Nsubane Community Area
- Tibiyo Ranches
- Siza Ranch
- F Vermaak (Farm)
- Richmond Estates
- Mr. Zikalala (Farm)

== Future plans ==
This park, once its proven itself will become part of the Greater Lubombo Transfrontier Conservation Area.
