= List of protected areas of Mozambique =

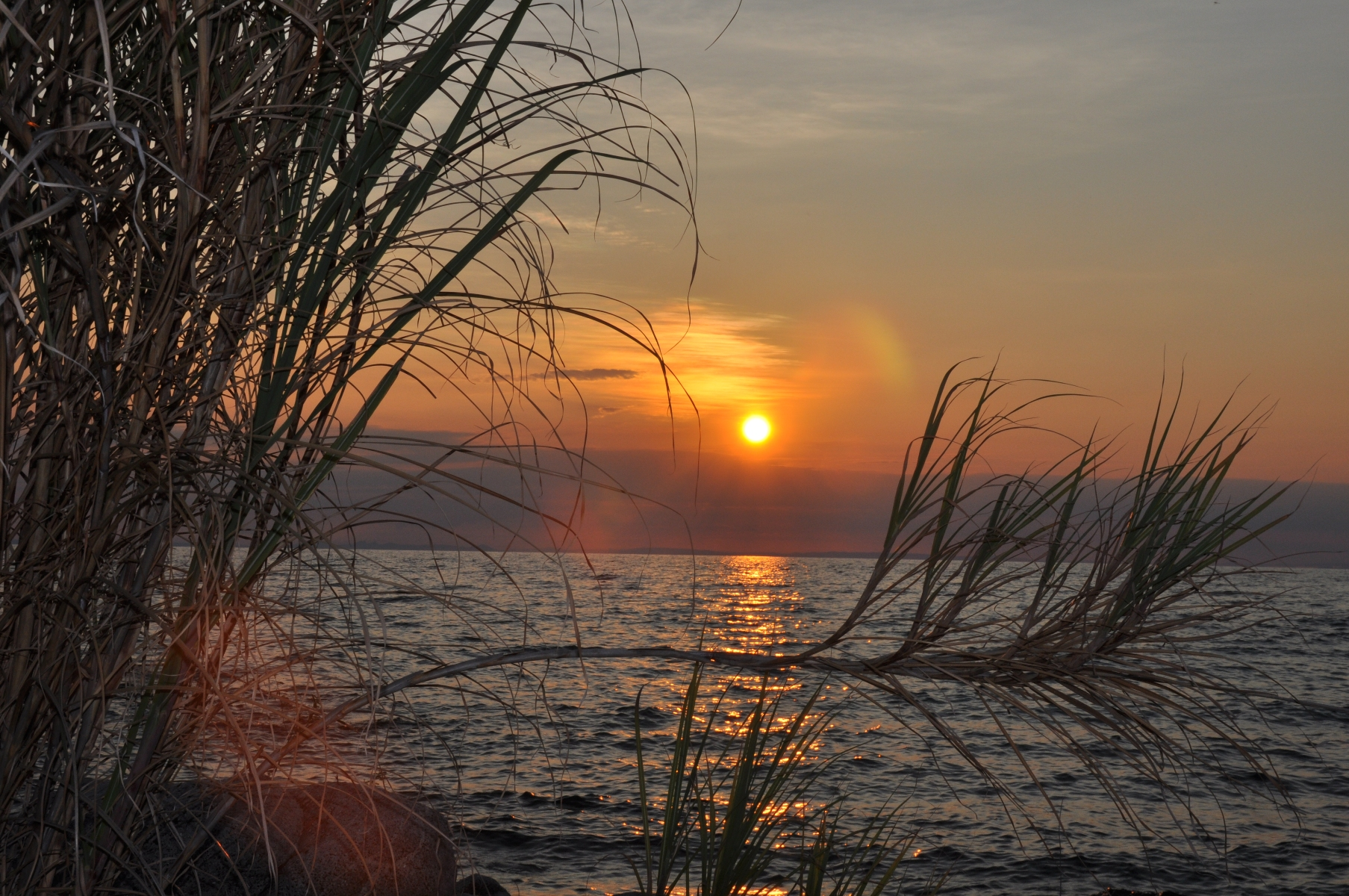
The sun over the Lake Niassa Reserve

Protected areas in Mozambique are known as conservation areas, and are currently grouped into national parks, national reserves, forest reserves, wildlife utilisation areas (coutadas), community conservation areas, and private game farms (fazendas de bravio). There are also a number of areas that have been declared as protected areas under a variety of different legislation, which for reasons of simplicity are here grouped together as "other protected areas." Under the Conservation Law of 2014 (Law 16/2014 of June 20), protected areas will need to be reclassified into a much more flexible series of new categories which are closer to the international system used by the IUCN. International initiatives such as transfrontier parks are grouped at the end of the page.

== National parks ==
- Banhine National Park, Parque Nacional de Banhine - Gaza (7,250 km^{2} (2,800 sq mi))
- Bazaruto National Park, Parque Nacional do Arquipelago de Bazaruto - Inhambane (1,463 km^{2} (565 sq mi))
- Chimanimani National Park, Parque Nacional de Chimanimani - Manica (656 km^{2} (253 sq mi))
- Gorongosa National Park, Parque Nacional da Gorongosa - Sofala (5,370 km^{2} (2,070 sq mi))
- Limpopo National Park, Parque Nacional do Limpopo - Gaza (11,233 km^{2} (4,337 sq mi))
- Magoe National Park, Parque Nacional do Magoe - Tete (3,558 km^{2} (1,374 sq mi))
- Quirimbas National Park, Parque Nacional das Quirimbas - Cabo Delgado (9,130 km^{2} (3,530 sq mi))
- Zinave National Park, Parque Nacional do Zinave - Inhambane (4,000 km^{2} (1,500 sq mi))

== National reserves ==
- Gilé National Reserve, Reserva Nacional do Gilé - Zambézia (4,436 km^{2} (1,713 sq mi))
- Maputo Special Reserve, Reserva Especial de Maputo - Maputo (1,040 km^{2} (400 sq mi))
- Marromeu Buffalo Reserve, Reserva de Búfalos de Marromeu - Sofala (1,500 km^{2} (580 sq mi))
- Niassa National Reserve, Reserva Nacional do Niassa - Niassa (42,200 km^{2} (16,300 sq mi))
- Pomene National Reserve, Reserva National de Pomene - Inhambane (50 km^{2} (19 sq mi))

== Other protected areas ==
- Lake Niassa Partial Marine Reserve, Reserva Marinha Parcial de Lago Niassa - Niassa (486 km^{2} (188 sq mi))
- Malhazine Municipal Park, Parque Ecológico de Malhazine - Maputo City (5.6 km^{2} (2.2 sq mi))
- Ponta do Ouro Partial Marine Reserve, Reserva Marinha Parcial de Ponta do Ouro - Maputo (673 km^{2} (260 sq mi))
- Primeiras and Segundas Islands Environmental Protected Area, Área de Protecção Ambiental do Arquipélago das Ilhas Primeiras e Segundas- Zambezia, Nampula (10,409 km^{2} (4,019 sq mi))
- Sao Sebastiao Total Protection Area, Area de Proteccao Total de Sao Sebastiao - Inhambane (439 km^{2} (169 sq mi))

== Community conservation areas ==
- Chipanje Chetu (6,065 km^{2} (2,342 sq mi))
- Mitcheu (113 km^{2} (44 sq mi))
- Tchuma Tchato (31,838 km^{2} (12,293 sq mi))

== Wildlife utilisation areas ==
- Coutada 4 - Manica (4,300 km^{2} (1,700 sq mi))
- Coutada 5 - Sofala (6,868 km^{2} (2,652 sq mi))
- Coutada 6 - Sofala (4,563 km^{2} (1,762 sq mi)) - extinguished in 2014
- Coutada 7 - Manica (5,408 km^{2} (2,088 sq mi))
- Coutada 8 - Sofala (310 km^{2} (120 sq mi)) - extinguished in 2014; became the Mitcheu Community Conservation Area
- Coutada 9 - Manica (4,333 km^{2} (1,673 sq mi))
- Coutada 10 - Sofala (2,008 km^{2} (775 sq mi))
- Coutada 11 - Sofala (1,928 km^{2} (744 sq mi))
- Coutada 12 - Sofala (2,963 km^{2} (1,144 sq mi))
- Coutada 13 - Manica (5,683 km^{2} (2,194 sq mi))
- Coutada 14 - Sofala (1,353 km^{2})
- Coutada 15 - Sofala (2,300 km^{2} (890 sq mi))
- Coutada 16 - now part of the Limpopo National Park
- Luabo (558 km^{2} (215 sq mi))
- Lureco (2,226 km^{2} (859 sq mi))
- Marupa
- Messalo (1,227 km^{2} (474 sq mi)
- Micaúne (240 km^{2} (93 sq mi))
- Mulela (964 km^{2} (372 sq mi))
- Nacúma (2,713 km^{2} (1,047 sq mi))
- Nicage (Cabo Delgado) (5,400 km^{2} (2,100 sq mi))
- Nipepe (1,382 km^{2} (534 sq mi))
- Nungo (3,288 km^{2} (1,270 sq mi))

== Forest reserves ==
- Baixo Pinda (196 km^{2} (76 sq mi))
- Derre (1,700 km^{2} (660 sq mi))
- Inhamitanga (16 km^{2} (6.2 sq mi))
- Licuáti (37 km^{2} (14 sq mi))
- Maronga (83 km^{2} (32 sq mi))
- Matibane (512 km^{2} (198 sq mi))
- Mecuburi (2,300 km^{2} (890 sq mi))
- Moribane (53 km^{2} (20 sq mi))
- M'palue (51 km^{2} (20 sq mi))
- Mucheve (91 km^{2} (35 sq mi))
- Nhampacue (170 km^{2} (66 sq mi))
- Ribáuè (52 km^{2} (20 sq mi))
- Zomba (28 km^{2} (11 sq mi))

== Private game farms ==
As of 2014, there were 50 private game farms in Mozambique.

== Ramsar sites ==
- Lake Niassa Ramsar Complex
- Marromeu Complex

== Transfrontier conservation areas ==
- Chimanimani Transfrontier Conservation Area - established in 1999 between the Mozambique and Zimbabwe governments

Extension: 2.056 km^{2} (0.794 mi^{2}; 508 acres)
Composition: Mozambique (Chimanimani National Reserve); Zimbabwe (Chimanimani National Park)

- Limpopo Transfrontier Conservation Area - established at December 10, 2004 among the Mozambique, Zimbabwe and South Africa governments

Extension: 84.868 km^{2} (32.768 sq mi)
Composition: Mozambique (Limpopo, Banhine and Zinave National Parks); Zimbabwe (Gonarezhou National Park, Manjinji Pan Sanctuary, Malipati Safari Area, Sengwe Community Area); South Africa (Kruger National Park, Makulele Region)

- Lubombo Transfrontier Conservation Area - established in June, 2000 among the Mozambique, Swaziland and South Africa governments

Extension: 4.17 km^{2} (1.61 sq mi)
Composition: Maputo Elephant Reserve (Mozambique), Tembe Elephant Park (South Africa) and Lubombo Conservancy (Eswatini)

== See also ==
- List of national parks in Africa
