= Futi Corridor =

Wildlife corridor in Mozambique

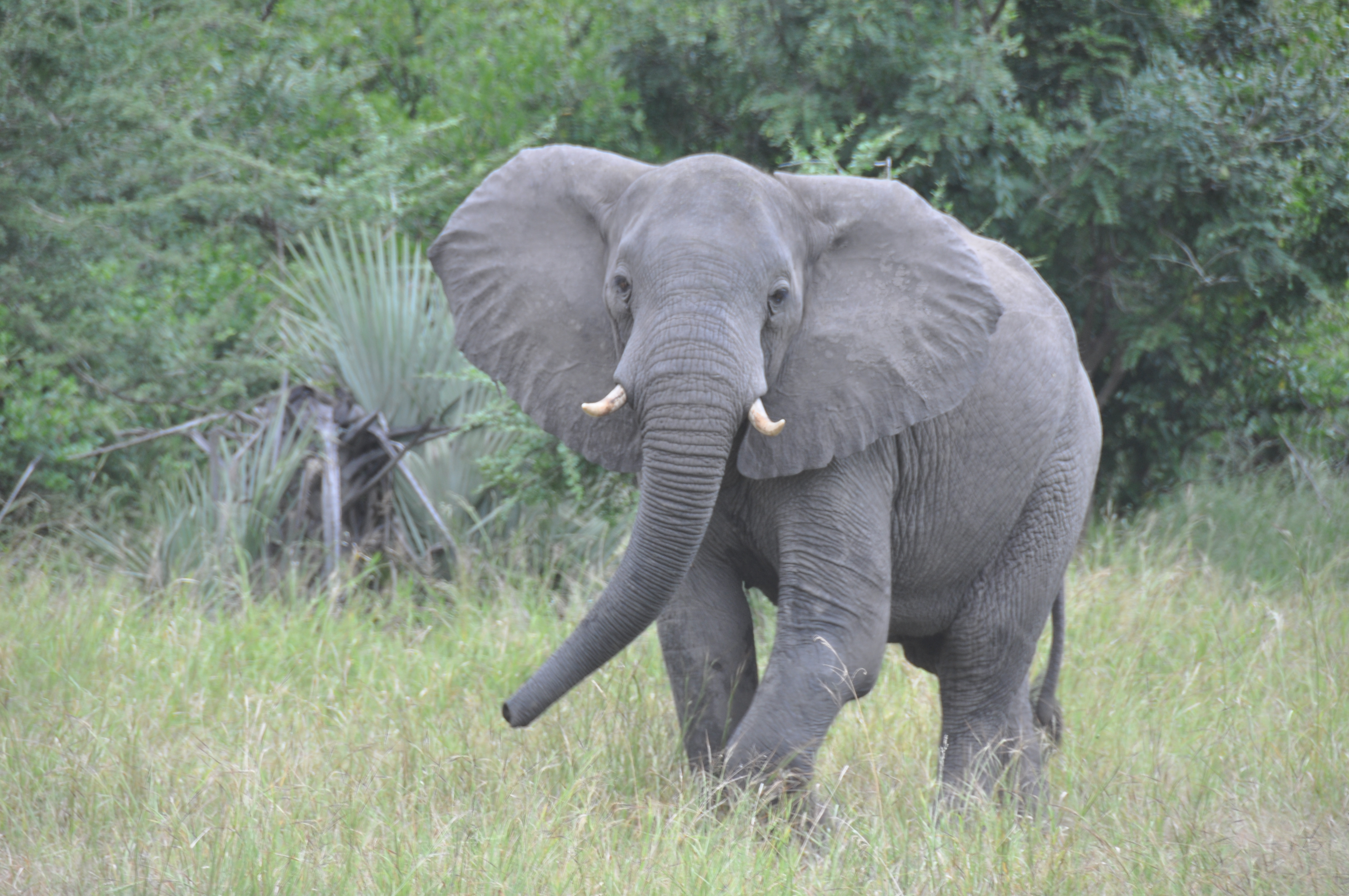
- The Futi Corridor seeks to restore a historical elephant migration path

- Location within Mozambique
- Location: Mozambique
- Coordinates: 26°44′9.4″S 32°42′34.73″E

Futi Corridor is a recently proclaimed protected area that forms a link between Maputo Special Reserve in Mozambique and Thembe Elephant Park in South Africa. It is a corridor of land along the Futi River. The corridor will effectively restore an historical migration and movement route of a valuable elephant population between Maputo Special Reserve and the Tembe Elephant Park in South Africa. The Futi Corridor covers 170,000 acres and the Muwai Community Association has mapped 24,710 acres of land on the western boundary to be incorporated into Maputo National Park.There is potential for the expansion of the community conservation area to the east and west of the Futi Corridor.

World Wide Fund for Nature has financed a 26 km electrified stay line to keep the elephants away from farmlands.

== Geography ==
The Maputo Special Reserve, formerly known as Maputo Elephant Reserve is a nature reserve of the state of Mozambique. It is located on Maputo Bay, approximately 100 kilometers southeast of the city of Maputo, Mozambique. The Reserve is 1,040 km^{2} (400 square mile) in extent and was originally proclaimed in 1932 to protect a small population of coastal elephants resident in the area. It is managed by the National Administration of Conservation Areas (ANAC) and is a IUCN category II reserve (WDPA 4652).

The Tembe Elephant Parc is a regional reserve of South African Ezemvelo KwaZulu-Natal Wildlife (EKZNW) (WDPA 39758) with no IUCN status.

The Futi River is the northern extension of the drainage line known as the Mosi Swamp, which rises near Manaba about 55 km south of the border. The Futi River does not reach the sea, but ends in swamp grasslands in the north of the Maputo Reserve.

The reserve will eventually form part of the Lubombo Transfrontier Conservation Area, which includes national parks from South Africa, Mozambique and Eswatini. At the moment it forms part of the Usuthu-Tembe-Futi Transfrontier Conservation Area.

== People ==
Changana and Ronga people inhabit the area, with traditional leadership structures surviving. Settlement and traditional leadership structures have survived. However, allegiances and affiliations are complex due to emigration, immigration, civil war, and cross-border interests. There is low human population density but it is increasing. Subsistence agriculture, livestock, and palm wine harvesting are primary economic activities. The Muwai Community Association is embracing conservation as an opportunity, despite past conflicts with elephants.

== Vegetation and landscape features ==
The Futi Corridor is a low-lying sand plain with a river that supports the largest reed and papyrus system in the subregion. The area has a unique mosaic of ecosystems including savannas, forests, and lakes. The proposed Muwai Community Conservation Area is mostly flat or gently undulating coastal Southern African Sand Forest, which is home to 30 endemic plant species and is part of the tropical and subtropical dry broadleaf forests biome.

== Large mammal populations ==
The Futi Corridor connects Tembe Elephant Reserve to Maputo National Park, forming a continuous elephant range. Maputo National Park is home to various wildlife species, including elephant, hippo, zebra, and impala. Once the Muwai Community Conservation Area is established and fenced, the existing worn-out fence will be removed, allowing free movement of large mammals, including rare antelope, between Maputo National Park and the new conservation area.

== Primary threats and opportunities ==
The tarred main road linking the area to Maputo has opened access and is resulting in a growing demand for land on either side of the Futi Corridor. Rapid habitat transformation, increased demand for bush meat, and deforestation for fuelwood are primary threats. To the people living in the area, human-elephant conflict represents a major problem.

according to the initiators, Muwai Community Conservation Area has the potential for tourism, game ranching, and other opportunities. The Futi Corridor is in an established tourism node near Ponto Do Ouro, close to the South African border. Development of safari products can combine with Maputo Special Reserve and marine experiences in Ponto Do Ouro. The Government of Mozambique is also interested in game ranching as a source of protein and to restock other depleted protected areas.
