= Hawane Nature Reserve =

Nature reserve in Eswatini

Hawane Nature reserve
- Interactive map of Hawane Nature reserve
- Location: Hhohho; Eswatini
- Coordinates: 26°11′50″S 31°05′45″E
- Area: 232 ha (570 acres)
- Administrator: Swaziland National Trust Commission

Designations

Ramsar Wetland
- Official name: Hawane Dam and Nature Reserve
- Designated: 12 June 2013
- Reference no.: 2121

Hawane Nature Reserve was first established in 1978 to protect an area of marsh along the Mbuluzi River in Eswatini. This area included the natural habitat of Kniphofia umbrina, a rare Eswatini endemic red hot poker. When the Hawane dam was built in 1988 to provide Mbabane's water supply, the reserve was expanded to protect the surrounding wetlands. The reserve is managed by the Swaziland National Trust Commission.

The reserve's main attraction is its wealth of birdlife. A trail is provided for bird-watching. Bird species include lanner falcon, Egyptian goose, pied kingfisher and white-faced whistling duck.

== See also ==
- List of birds of Eswatini
