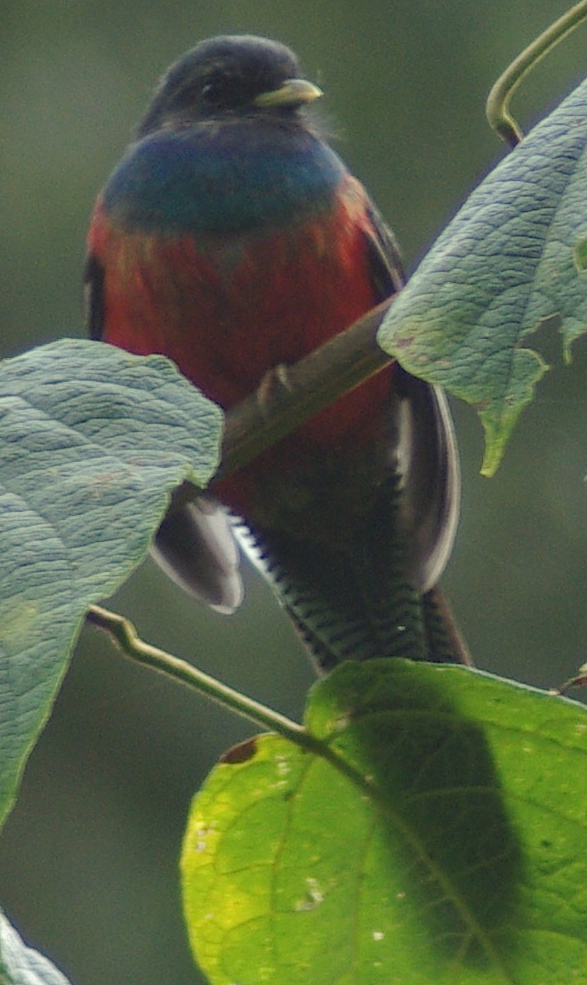
- Subadult, potentially male, in Kenya

Conservation status
- Least Concern (IUCN 3.1)

Scientific classification
- Kingdom: Animalia
- Phylum: Chordata
- Class: Aves
- Order: Trogoniformes
- Family: Trogonidae
- Genus: Apaloderma
- Species: A. vittatum

Binomial name
- Apaloderma vittatum Shelley, 1882

Synonyms
- Hapaloderma vittatum

= Bar-tailed trogon =

Species of bird

The bar-tailed trogon (Apaloderma vittatum) is a species of bird in the family Trogonidae. It is a resident bird native to central Africa that eats primarily insects and fruit.

== Description ==
The bar-tailed trogon averages about 28 centimetres (11 in) long. The bill and feet are yellow, and the tail, long and broad as usual for trogons, has the underside narrowly barred with black and white. The male's head is blue-black with bronze iridescence. Below the eye are two yellow or orange patches of bare skin; above the eye is a yellow or grey patch. The upper breast is iridescent from violet to blue-green; the rest of the underparts are red. The back is green and the upper surface of the tail is blue-black or purple-black. The female's head is brown with less ornamental bare skin and its throat and breast are light cinnamon; otherwise it resembles the male. The immature is similar to the female, but has a white belly and pale spots on the wings formed by the tips of the wing coverts and inner secondaries.

The vocalisations are described as a yelping crescendo, "yaow, yow, yow, yow… or wuk-wuk-wuk-wuk…". The female gives "a whining chee-uu".

== Distribution and habitat ==
The bar-tailed trogon is found in Angola, Burundi, Cameroon, the Congo, Equatorial Guinea, Kenya, Malawi, Mozambique, Nigeria, Rwanda, Tanzania, Uganda, and Zambia. It lives in forests; at altitudes between 900 and 3,000 m (3,000 and 9,800 ft), is typically higher than that of the Narina trogon, but the two occur together in some places.

== Behaviour ==
=== Feeding ===
The bar-tailed trogon, similar to other trogons, feeds on insects and fruit.

=== Breeding ===
The bar-tailed trogon breeding season occurs as the dry season ends at the rainy season begins (October and November). Yearlings are not known to mate or hold territories; however, there have been reports of them singing.

== Conservation ==
The IUCN classifies the bar-tailed trogon as Least Concern but the species is experiencing a decreasing trend due to habitat destruction.

== Gallery ==
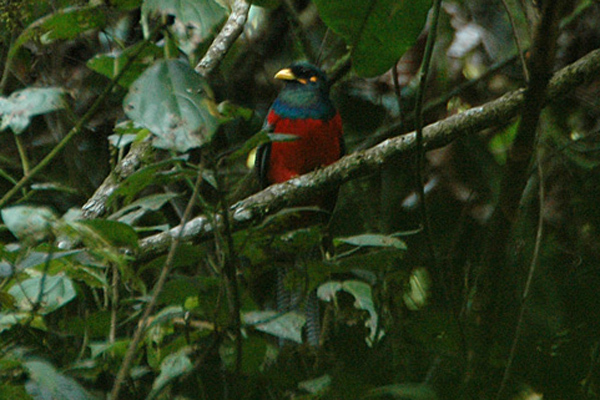
Adult male at Bwindi, western Uganda

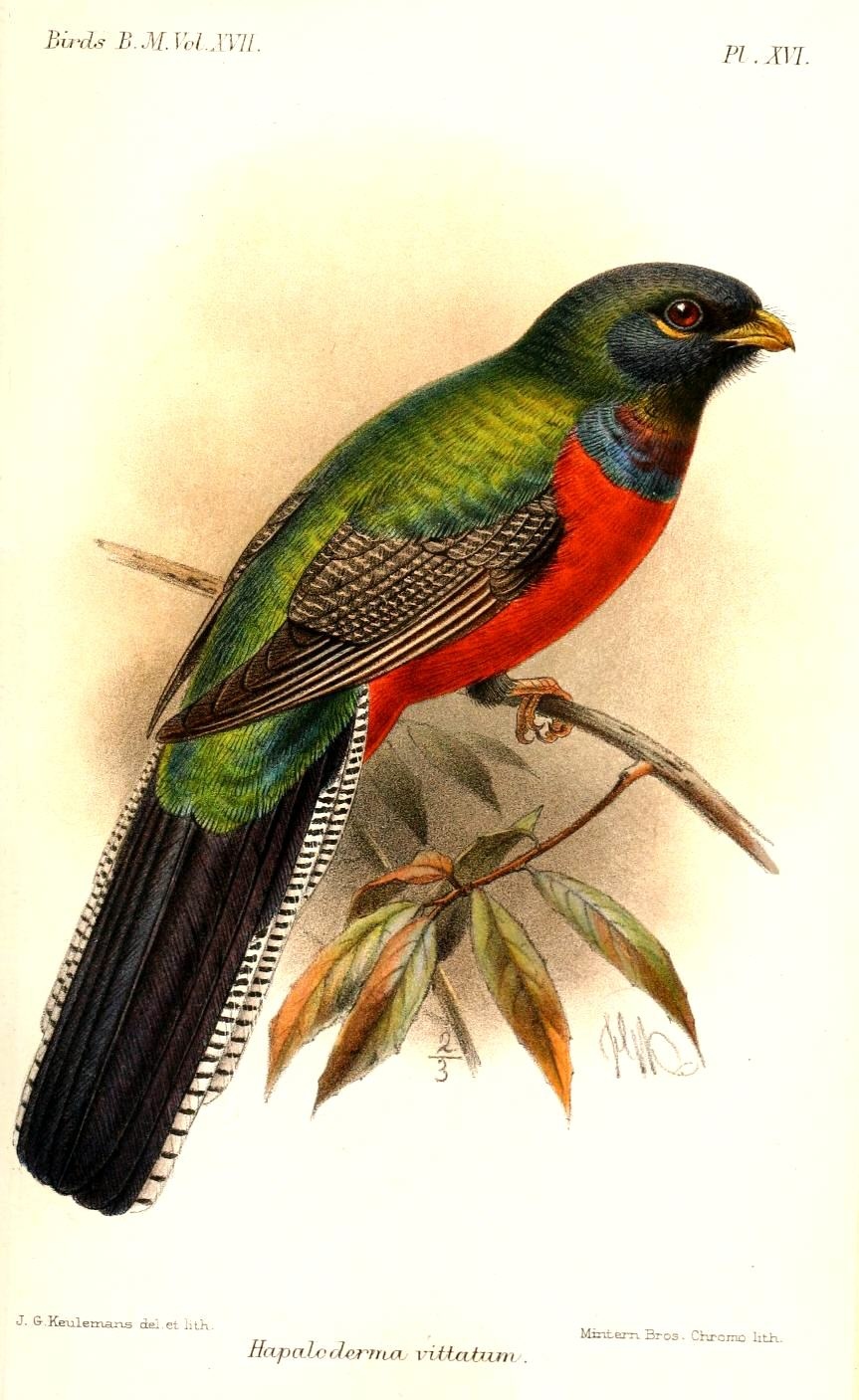
Illustration by Keulemans, 1892

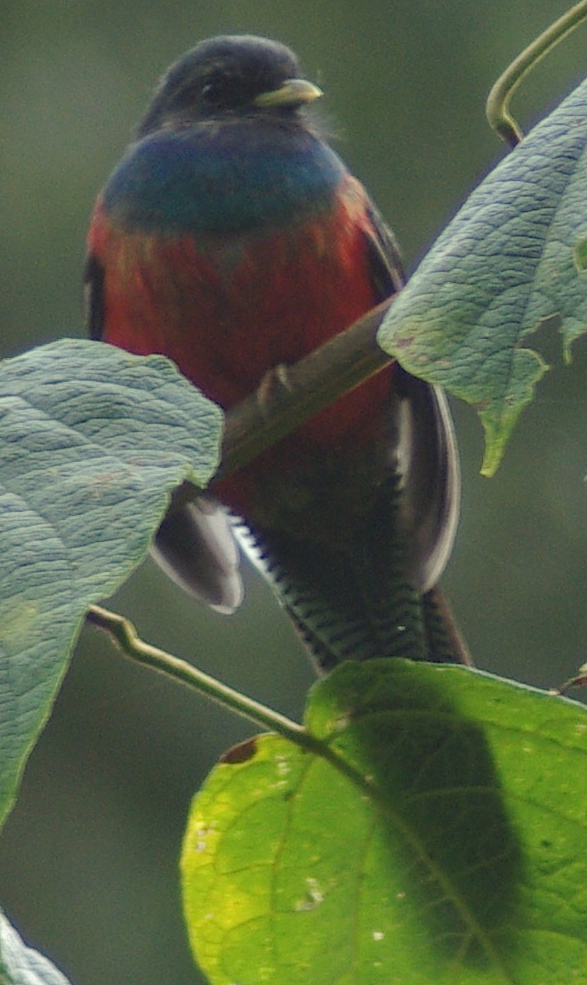
Subadult, potentially male; Kenya.
