= Malolotja National Park =

Coordinates: 26.098°S 31.099°E

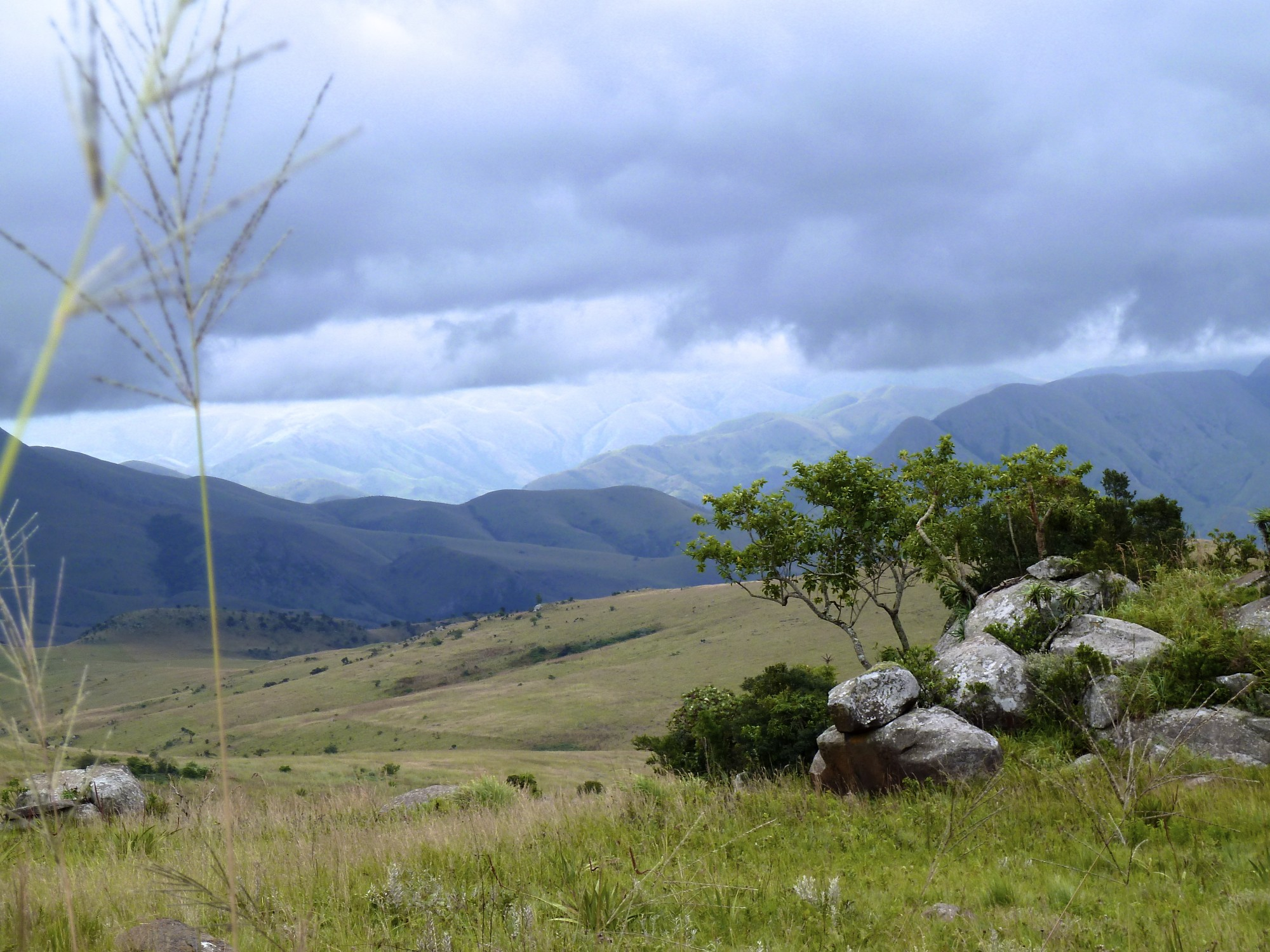
View on the national park

Malolotja National Park covers 180 km^{2} (69 sq mi) of mountain wilderness on Eswatini's northwestern border with South Africa. The park includes Ngwenya Mountain, Eswatini's second highest mountain (1,829 m), and Malolotja Falls which drop 89 metres (292 ft), the highest in Eswatini. Habitats include short grassland to thick riverine shrub, bushveld and Afromontane forest.

Malolotja National Park adjoins the Songimvelo Game Reserve in South Africa, and together they form the Songimvelo-Malolotja Transboundary Protected Area or Peace Park, which in turn is part of the Lubombo Transfrontier Conservation Area.

== History ==
The region was identified as important by the Swaziland National Trust Commission in the early 1970s. At that time most of the area was sheep grazing land and much was privately owned. However, the area had little agricultural potential and residents were resettled on good agricultural land adjacent to Malolotja.

== Environment ==
=== Flora and fauna ===
There are tall grasses, orchids, lilies, and ancient cycads.

Mammals in the park include zebra, wildebeest, reedbuck, blesbok, red hartebeest, oribi, leopard, serval, aardwolf, jackal and bushpig. The Natal ghost frog, plaintive rain frog and the gray's stream frog are native to Eswatini, South Africa and Lesotho; in Eswatini they have only been found in Afromontane mist belt forest.

The park has been recognised as an Important Bird Area (IBA) by BirdLife International. Bird species include turacos, sunbirds, sugarbirds, blue cranes and swallows. Southern bald ibises nest in colony on cliffs near Malolotja Falls. A number of bird species are of conservation importance, because their habitat is limited and threatened outside the park. They are the orange ground thrush, brown scrub robin, bush blackcap, chorister robin-chat, white-starred robin, grey cuckooshrike, olive bushshrike, southern boubou, Narina trogon and Knysna turaco.

=== Climate ===
Most rain falls in summer thunderstorms from December to April. Frost is common in June and July.

== Ngwenya Mine ==
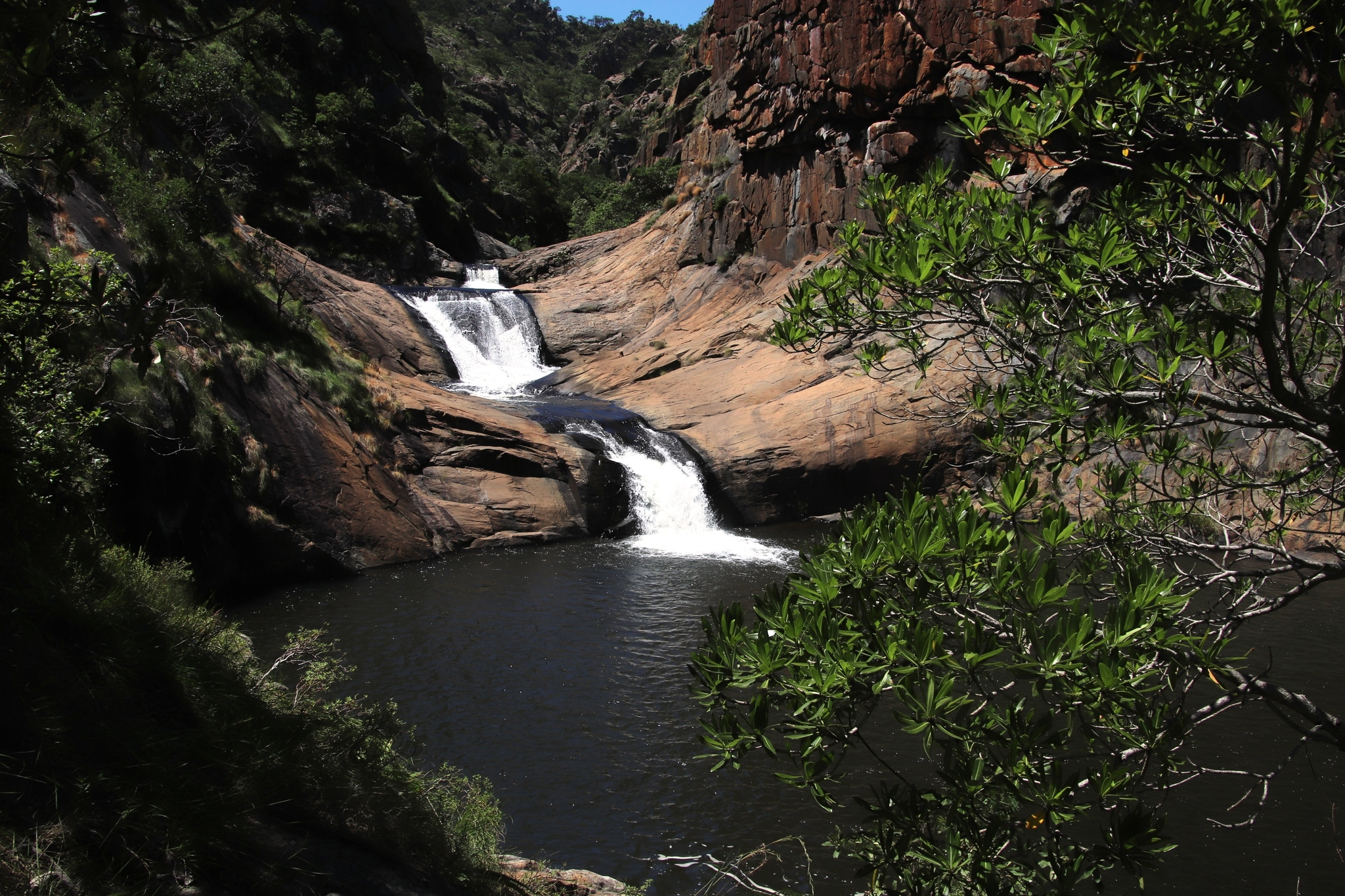
Matumi tree on the banks of the Malolotja River below Potholes.

The Ngwenya iron ore mine is located within the park, near the Hawane Dam. Salgaocar is the company that is contracted to extract over 32 million tons of ore, amid much protest from locals over environmental repercussions and the detriment to one of the nation's main water supplies.

== Tourism ==
There are only 25 kilometres (16 mi) of road in the park, but much more can be explored on 4×4s, mountain bike or by hiking. There are a number of designated camping sites.

== See also ==
- List of birds of Eswatini
- List of mammals of Eswatini
