= Mlawula Nature Reserve =

Nature reserve in Eswatini

Coordinates: 26°11′00″S 31°59′00″E

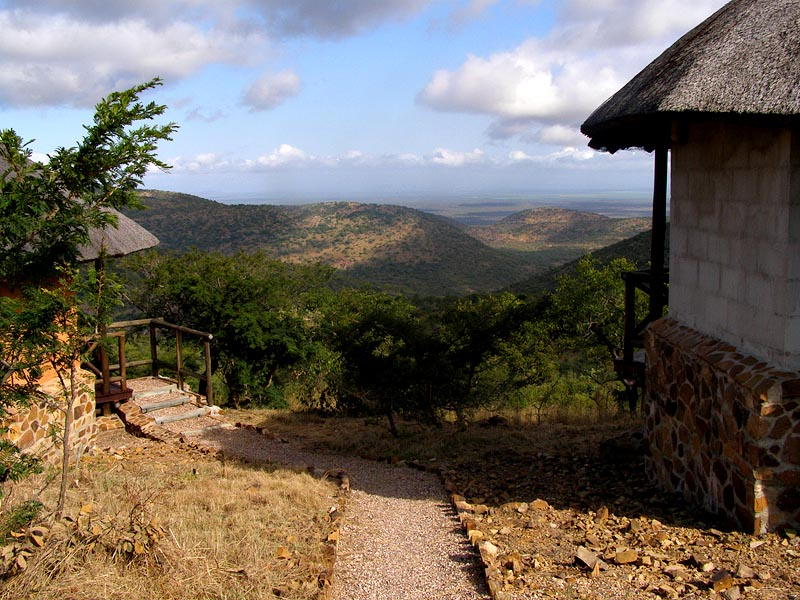
View from Magadzevane Camp on the Lubombo mountains

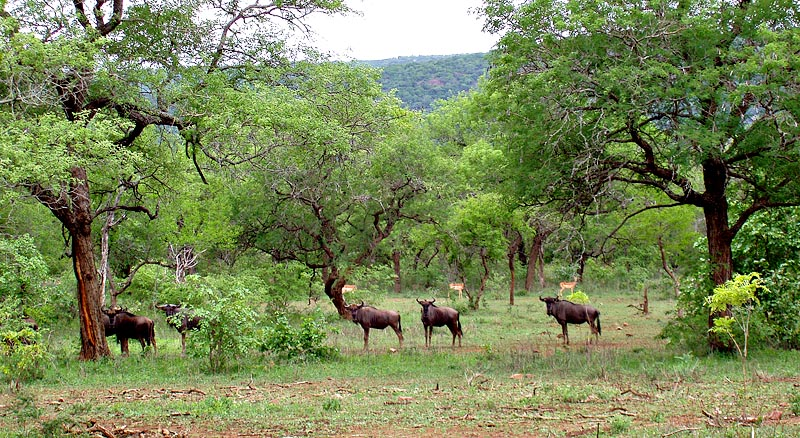
Blue wildebeest and impala in Acacia nigrescens savanna

The Mlawula Nature Reserve is a nature reserve situated in north-eastern Eswatini. It covers approximately 165 km^{2} (64 sq mi) and is adjacent to Mbuluzi Game Reserve, Simunye Nature Reserve, and Hlane Royal National Park.

The Mlawula area was first proclaimed as a protected area in 1914 but was subsequently deproclaimed and subdivided into cattle ranches. The first part of Mlawula to be proclaimed as a conservation area was donated in 1978, to become Ndzindza Nature Reserve. Mlawula Estates were purchased soon after followed by the donation of Nyala Ranch.

Mlawula has a high bird diversity and over 350 species have been recorded.
