= Usuthu-Tembe-Futi Transfrontier Conservation Area =

Group of protected areas in southern Africa

Usuthu-Tembe-Futi Transfrontier Conservation Area is a group of protected areas in southern Africa, straddling parts of South Africa, Mozambique and Eswatini, including the following:

- Maputo Special Reserve (Mozambique).
- The Futi Corridor (Mozambique).
- Usuthu Gorge Conservancy (Eswatini).
  - Tshanini Community Conservation Areas.
  - Usuthu Gorge Community Conservation Areas.
- Ndumo Game Reserve (South Africa).
- Tembe Elephant Park (South Africa).
  - Community Area left of the Thembe Elephant Park.
  - Community Area right of the Thembe Elephant Park.

== Future plans ==
This park once its proven itself is to become part of the Greater Lubombo Transfrontier Conservation Area.
