= Wildlife of Eswatini =

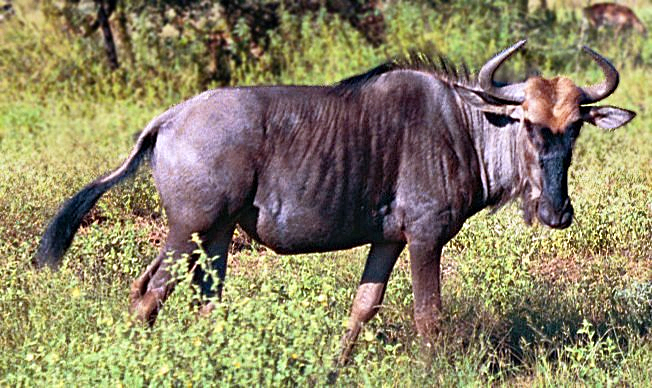
Blue wildebeest

The wildlife of Eswatini is composed of its flora and fauna. The country has 107 species of mammals and 507 species of birds.

== Flora ==
Grassland, savanna, mixed bush, and scrub cover most of Swaziland. There is some forest in the highlands. Flora include aloes, orchids, and begonias.
