= List of birds of Eswatini =

This is a list of the bird species recorded in Eswatini. The avifauna of Eswatini (formerly Swaziland) include a total of 521 species, of which 5 have been introduced by humans. Three species listed are extirpated in Eswatini.

This list's taxonomic treatment (designation and sequence of orders, families and species) and nomenclature (common and scientific names) follow the conventions of The Clements Checklist of Birds of the World, 2022 edition. The family accounts at the beginning of each heading reflect this taxonomy, as do the species counts found in each family account. Introduced and accidental species are included in the total counts for Eswatini.

The following tags have been used to highlight several categories. The commonly occurring native species do not fall into any of these categories.

- (A) Accidental - a species that rarely or accidentally occurs in Eswatini
- (I) Introduced - a species introduced to Eswatini as a consequence, direct or indirect, of human actions
- (Ex) Extirpated - a species that no longer occurs in Eswatini although populations exist elsewhere

== Ostriches ==
Order: Struthioniformes Family: Struthionidae

The ostrich is a flightless bird native to Africa. It is the largest living species of bird. It is distinctive in its appearance, with a long neck and legs and the ability to run at high speeds.

- Common ostrich, Struthio camelus
  - South African ostrich, Struthio camelus australis (I)

== Ducks, geese, and waterfowl ==
Order: Anseriformes Family: Anatidae

Anatidae includes the ducks and most duck-like waterfowl, such as geese and swans. These birds are adapted to an aquatic existence with webbed feet, flattened bills, and feathers that are excellent at shedding water due to an oily coating.

- White-faced whistling-duck, Dendrocygna viduata
- Fulvous whistling-duck, Dendrocygna bicolor
- White-backed duck, Thalassornis leuconotus
- Knob-billed duck, Sarkidiornis melanotos
- Egyptian goose, Alopochen aegyptiacus
- Spur-winged goose, Plectropterus gambensis
- African pygmy-goose, Nettapus auritus
- Blue-billed teal, Spatula hottentota (A)
- Cape shoveler, Spatula smithii (A)
- African black duck, Anas sparsa
- Yellow-billed duck, Anas undulata
- Cape teal, Anas capensis (A)
- Red-billed duck, Anas erythrorhyncha
- Southern pochard, Netta erythrophthalma (A)
- Maccoa duck, Oxyura maccoa (A)

== Guineafowl ==
Order: Galliformes Family: Numididae

Guineafowl are a group of African, seed-eating, ground-nesting birds that resemble partridges, but with featherless heads and spangled grey plumage.

- Helmeted guineafowl, Numida meleagris
- Southern crested guineafowl, Guttera edouardi

== Pheasants, grouse, and allies ==
Order: Galliformes Family: Phasianidae

The Phasianidae are a family of terrestrial birds which consists of quails, partridges, snowcocks, francolins, spurfowls, tragopans, monals, pheasants, peafowls and jungle fowls. In general, they are plump (although they vary in size) and have broad, relatively short wings.

- Crested francolin, Ortygornis sephaena
- Coqui francolin, Campocolinus coqui
- Red-winged francolin, Scleroptila levaillantii
- Shelley's francolin, Scleroptila shelleyi
- Blue quail, Synoicus adansonii (A)
- Common quail, Coturnix coturnix
- Harlequin quail, Coturnix delegorguei
- Natal francolin, Pternistis natalensis
- Swainson's francolin, Pternistis swainsonii
- Red-necked francolin, Pternistis afer

== Flamingos ==
Order: Phoenicopteriformes Family: Phoenicopteridae

Flamingos are gregarious wading birds, usually 3 to 5 feet (0.9 to 1.5 m) tall, found in both the Western and Eastern Hemispheres. Flamingos filter-feed on shellfish and algae. Their oddly shaped beaks are specially adapted to separate mud and silt from the food they consume and, uniquely, are used upside-down.

- Greater flamingo, Phoenicopterus roseus (A)
- Lesser flamingo, Phoenicopterus minor (A)

== Grebes ==
Order: Podicipediformes Family: Podicipedidae

Grebes are small to medium-large freshwater diving birds. They have lobed toes and are excellent swimmers and divers. However, they have their feet placed far back on the body, making them quite ungainly on land.

- Little grebe, Tachybaptus ruficollis
- Great crested grebe, Podiceps cristatus (A)
- Eared grebe, Podiceps nigricollis (A)

== Pigeons and doves ==
Order: Columbiformes Family: Columbidae

Pigeons and doves are stout-bodied birds with short necks and short slender bills with a fleshy cere.

- Rock pigeon, Columba livia (I)
- Speckled pigeon, Columba guinea
- Rameron pigeon, Columba arquatrix
- Lemon dove, Columba larvata
- Red-eyed dove, Streptopelia semitorquata
- Ring-necked dove, Streptopelia capicola
- Laughing dove, Streptopelia senegalensis
- Emerald-spotted wood-dove, Turtur chalcospilos
- Tambourine dove, Turtur tympanistria
- Namaqua dove, Oena capensis
- African green-pigeon, Treron calva

== Bustards ==
Order: Otidiformes Family: Otididae

Bustards are large terrestrial birds mainly associated with dry open country and steppes in the Old World. They are omnivorous and nest on the ground. They walk steadily on strong legs and big toes, pecking for food as they go. They have long broad wings with "fingered" wingtips and striking patterns in flight. Many have interesting mating displays.

- Kori bustard, Ardeotis kori (Ex)
- Denham's bustard, Neotis denhami
- White-bellied bustard, Eupodotis senegalensis
- Red-crested korhaan, Lophotis ruficrista
- Black-bellied bustard, Lissotis melanogaster

== Turacos ==
Order: Musophagiformes Family: Musophagidae

The turacos, plantain eaters and go-away-birds make up the bird family Musophagidae. They are medium-sized arboreal birds. The turacos and plantain eaters are brightly coloured, usually in blue, green or purple. The go-away birds are mostly grey and white.

- Livingstone's turaco, Tauraco livingstonii
- Knysna turaco, Tauraco corythaix
- Purple-crested turaco, Tauraco porphyreolophus
- Gray go-away-bird, Corythaixoides concolor

== Cuckoos ==
Order: Cuculiformes Family: Cuculidae

The family Cuculidae includes cuckoos, roadrunners and anis. These birds are of variable size with slender bodies, long tails and strong legs. The Old World cuckoos are brood parasites.

- White-browed coucal, Centropus superciliosus
- Black coucal, Centropus grillii
- Green malkoha, Ceuthmochares australis
- Great spotted cuckoo, Clamator glandarius
- Levaillant's cuckoo, Clamator levaillantii
- Pied cuckoo, Clamator jacobinus
- Thick-billed cuckoo, Pachycoccyx audeberti
- Dideric cuckoo, Chrysococcyx caprius
- Klaas's cuckoo, Chrysococcyx klaas
- African emerald cuckoo, Chrysococcyx cupreus
- Black cuckoo, Cuculus clamosus
- Red-chested cuckoo, Cuculus solitarius
- African cuckoo, Cuculus gularis
- Common cuckoo, Cuculus canorus

== Nightjars and allies ==
Order: Caprimulgiformes Family: Caprimulgidae

Nightjars are medium-sized nocturnal birds that usually nest on the ground. They have long wings, short legs and very short bills. Most have small feet, of little use for walking, and long pointed wings. Their soft plumage is camouflaged to resemble bark or leaves.

- Pennant-winged nightjar, Caprimulgus vexillarius
- Eurasian nightjar, Caprimulgus europaeus
- Fiery-necked nightjar, Caprimulgus pectoralis
- Freckled nightjar, Caprimulgus tristigma
- Square-tailed nightjar, Caprimulgus fossii

== Swifts ==
Order: Caprimulgiformes Family: Apodidae

Swifts are small birds which spend the majority of their lives flying. These birds have very short legs and never settle voluntarily on the ground, perching instead only on vertical surfaces. Many swifts have long swept-back wings which resemble a crescent or boomerang.

- Alpine swift, Apus melba
- Common swift, Apus apus
- African swift, Apus barbatus
- Little swift, Apus affinis
- Horus swift, Apus horus
- White-rumped swift, Apus caffer
- African palm-swift, Cypsiurus parvus

== Flufftails ==
Order: Gruiformes Family: Sarothruridae

The flufftails are a small family of ground-dwelling birds found only in Madagascar and sub-Saharan Africa.

- Buff-spotted flufftail, Sarothrura elegans
- Red-chested flufftail, Sarothrura rufa
- Striped flufftail, Sarothrura affinis
- White-winged flufftail, Sarothrura ayresi (A)

== Rails, gallinules and coots ==
Order: Gruiformes Family: Rallidae

Rallidae is a large family of small to medium-sized birds which includes the rails, crakes, coots and gallinules. Typically they inhabit dense vegetation in damp environments near lakes, swamps or rivers. In general they are shy and secretive birds, making them difficult to observe. Most species have strong legs and long toes which are well adapted to soft uneven surfaces. They tend to have short, rounded wings and to be weak fliers.

- African rail, Rallus caerulescens
- Corn crake, Crex crex
- African crake, Crex egregia
- Lesser moorhen, Paragallinula angulata
- Eurasian moorhen, Gallinula chloropus
- Red-knobbed coot, Fulica cristata
- Allen's gallinule, Porphyrio alleni (A)
- African swamphen, Porphyrio madagascariensis
- Black crake, Zapornia flavirostris
- Baillon's crake, Zapornia pusilla (A)

== Finfoots ==
Order: Gruiformes Family: Heliornithidae

Heliornithidae is a small family of tropical birds with webbed lobes on their feet similar to those of grebes and coots.

- African finfoot, Podica senegalensis

== Cranes ==
Order: Gruiformes Family: Gruidae

Cranes are large, long-legged and long-necked birds. Unlike the similar-looking but unrelated herons, cranes fly with necks outstretched, not pulled back. Most have elaborate and noisy courting displays or "dances".

- Gray crowned crane, Balearica regulorum
- Blue crane, Anthropoides paradiseus
- Wattled crane, Bugeranus carunculatus (Ex)

== Thick-knees ==
Order: Charadriiformes Family: Burhinidae

The thick-knees are a group of largely tropical waders in the family Burhinidae. They are found worldwide within the tropical zone, with some species also breeding in temperate Europe and Australia. They are medium to large waders with strong black or yellow-black bills, large yellow eyes and cryptic plumage. Despite being classed as waders, most species have a preference for arid or semi-arid habitats.

- Water thick-knee, Burhinus vermiculatus
- Spotted thick-knee, Burhinus capensis

== Stilts and avocets ==
Order: Charadriiformes Family: Recurvirostridae

Recurvirostridae is a family of large wading birds, which includes the avocets and stilts. The avocets have long legs and long up-curved bills. The stilts have extremely long legs and long, thin, straight bills.

- Black-winged stilt, Himantopus himantopus
- Pied avocet, Recurvirostra avosetta (A)

== Plovers and lapwings ==
Order: Charadriiformes Family: Charadriidae

The family Charadriidae includes the plovers, dotterels and lapwings. They are small to medium-sized birds with compact bodies, short, thick necks and long, usually pointed, wings. They are found in open country worldwide, mostly in habitats near water.

- Black-bellied plover, Pluvialis squatarola (A)
- Blacksmith lapwing, Vanellus armatus
- Senegal lapwing, Vanellus lugubris
- Black-winged lapwing, Vanellus melanopterus
- Crowned lapwing, Vanellus coronatus
- Wattled lapwing, Vanellus senegallus
- Caspian plover, Charadrius asiaticus (A)
- Kittlitz's plover, Charadrius pecuarius
- Common ringed plover, Charadrius hiaticula
- Three-banded plover, Charadrius tricollaris
- White-fronted plover, Charadrius marginatus (A)
- Chestnut-banded plover, Charadrius pallidus

== Painted-snipes ==
Order: Charadriiformes Family: Rostratulidae

Painted-snipes are short-legged, long-billed birds similar in shape to the true snipes, but more brightly coloured.

- Greater painted-snipe, Rostratula benghalensis

== Jacanas ==
Order: Charadriiformes Family: Jacanidae

The jacanas are a group of tropical waders in the family Jacanidae. They are found throughout the tropics. They are identifiable by their huge feet and claws which enable them to walk on floating vegetation in the shallow lakes that are their preferred habitat.

- Lesser jacana, Microparra capensis (A)
- African jacana, Actophilornis africanus

== Sandpipers and allies ==
Order: Charadriiformes Family: Scolopacidae

Scolopacidae is a large diverse family of small to medium-sized shorebirds including the sandpipers, curlews, godwits, shanks, tattlers, woodcocks, snipes, dowitchers and phalaropes. The majority of these species eat small invertebrates picked out of the mud or soil. Variation in length of legs and bills enables multiple species to feed in the same habitat, particularly on the coast, without direct competition for food.

- Ruddy turnstone, Arenaria interpres (A)
- Ruff, Calidris pugnax
- Curlew sandpiper, Calidris ferruginea
- Sanderling, Calidris alba (A)
- Little stint, Calidris minuta
- African snipe, Gallinago nigripennis
- Terek sandpiper, Xenus cinereus (A)
- Common sandpiper, Actitis hypoleucos
- Green sandpiper, Tringa ochropus
- Common greenshank, Tringa nebularia
- Marsh sandpiper, Tringa stagnatilis
- Wood sandpiper, Tringa glareola

== Buttonquail ==
Order: Charadriiformes Family: Turnicidae

The buttonquail are small, drab, running birds which resemble the true quails. The female is the brighter of the sexes and initiates courtship. The male incubates the eggs and tends the young.

- Small buttonquail, Turnix sylvatica
- Black-rumped buttonquail, Turnix nanus
- Fynbos buttonquail, Turnix hottentottus

== Pratincoles and coursers ==
Order: Charadriiformes Family: Glareolidae

Glareolidae is a family of wading birds comprising the pratincoles, which have short legs, long pointed wings and long forked tails, and the coursers, which have long legs, short wings and long, pointed bills which curve downwards.

- Temminck's courser, Cursorius temminckii
- Bronze-winged courser, Rhinoptilus chalcopterus
- Collared pratincole, Glareola pratincola

== Gulls, terns, and skimmers ==
Order: Charadriiformes Family: Laridae

Laridae is a family of medium to large seabirds, the gulls, terns and skimmers. Gulls are typically grey or white, often with black markings on the head or wings. They have stout, longish bills and webbed feet. Terns are a group of generally medium to large seabirds typically with grey or white plumage, often with black markings on the head. Most terns hunt fish by diving but some pick insects off the surface of fresh water. Terns are generally long-lived birds, with several species known to live in excess of 30 years.

- Gray-hooded gull, Chroicocephalus cirrocephalus (A)
- Sooty tern, Onychoprion fuscatus (A)
- Caspian tern, Hydroprogne caspia (A)
- White-winged tern, Chlidonias leucopterus
- Whiskered tern, Chlidonias hybrida

== Storks ==
Order: Ciconiiformes Family: Ciconiidae

Storks are large, long-legged, long-necked, wading birds with long, stout bills. Storks are mute, but bill-clattering is an important mode of communication at the nest. Their nests can be large and may be reused for many years. Many species are migratory.

- African openbill, Anastomus lamelligerus
- Black stork, Ciconia nigra
- Abdim's stork, Ciconia abdimii
- African woolly-necked stork, Ciconia microscelis
- White stork, Ciconia ciconia
- Saddle-billed stork, Ephippiorhynchus senegalensis
- Marabou stork, Leptoptilos crumenifer
- Yellow-billed stork, Mycteria ibis

== Anhingas ==
Order: Suliformes Family: Anhingidae

Anhingas or darters are often called "snake-birds" because of their long thin neck, which gives a snake-like appearance when they swim with their bodies submerged. The males have black and dark-brown plumage, an erectile crest on the nape and a larger bill than the female. The females have much paler plumage especially on the neck and underparts. The darters have completely webbed feet and their legs are short and set far back on the body. Their plumage is somewhat permeable, like that of cormorants, and they spread their wings to dry after diving.

- African darter, Anhinga rufa

== Cormorants and shags ==
Order: Suliformes Family: Phalacrocoracidae

Phalacrocoracidae is a family of medium to large coastal, fish-eating seabirds that includes cormorants and shags. Plumage colouration varies, with the majority having mainly dark plumage, some species being black-and-white and a few being colourful.

- Long-tailed cormorant, Microcarbo africanus
- Great cormorant, Phalacrocorax carbo

== Pelicans ==
Order: Pelecaniformes Family: Pelecanidae

Pelicans are large water birds with a distinctive pouch under their beak. As with other members of the order Pelecaniformes, they have webbed feet with four toes.

- Great white pelican, Pelecanus onocrotalus (A)
- Pink-backed pelican, Pelecanus rufescens

== Hammerkop ==
Order: Pelecaniformes Family: Scopidae

The hammerkop is a medium-sized bird with a long shaggy crest. The shape of its head with a curved bill and crest at the back is reminiscent of a hammer, hence its name. Its plumage is drab-brown all over.

- Hamerkop, Scopus umbretta

== Herons, egrets, and bitterns ==
Order: Pelecaniformes Family: Ardeidae

The family Ardeidae contains the bitterns, herons and egrets. Herons and egrets are medium to large wading birds with long necks and legs. Bitterns tend to be shorter necked and more wary. Members of Ardeidae fly with their necks retracted, unlike other long-necked birds such as storks, ibises and spoonbills.

- Little bittern, Ixobrychus minutus
- Dwarf bittern, Ixobrychus sturmii
- Gray heron, Ardea cinerea
- Black-headed heron, Ardea melanocephala
- Goliath heron, Ardea goliath
- Purple heron, Ardea purpurea
- Great egret, Ardea alba
- Intermediate egret, Ardea intermedia
- Little egret, Egretta garzetta
- Black heron, Egretta ardesiaca (A)
- Cattle egret, Bubulcus ibis
- Squacco heron, Ardeola ralloides
- Rufous-bellied heron, Ardeola rufiventris (A)
- Striated heron, Butorides striata
- Black-crowned night-heron, Nycticorax nycticorax
- White-backed night-heron, Gorsachius leuconotus

== Ibises and spoonbills ==
Order: Pelecaniformes Family: Threskiornithidae

Threskiornithidae is a family of large terrestrial and wading birds which includes the ibises and spoonbills. They have long, broad wings with 11 primary and about 20 secondary feathers. They are strong fliers and despite their size and weight, very capable soarers.

- Glossy ibis, Plegadis falcinellus
- African sacred ibis, Threskiornis aethiopicus
- Southern bald ibis, Geronticus calvus
- Hadada ibis, Bostrychia hagedash
- African spoonbill, Platalea alba

== Secretarybird ==
Order: Accipitriformes Family: Sagittariidae

The secretarybird is a bird of prey in the order Accipitriformes but is easily distinguished from other raptors by its long crane-like legs.

- Secretarybird, Sagittarius serpentarius

== Osprey ==
Order: Accipitriformes Family: Pandionidae

The family Pandionidae contains only one species, the osprey. The osprey is a medium-large raptor which is a specialist fish-eater with a worldwide distribution.

- Osprey, Pandion haliaetus

== Hawks, eagles, and kites ==
Order: Accipitriformes Family: Accipitridae

Accipitridae is a family of birds of prey, which includes hawks, eagles, kites, harriers and Old World vultures. These birds have powerful hooked beaks for tearing flesh from their prey, strong legs, powerful talons and keen eyesight.

- Black-winged kite, Elanus caeruleus
- African harrier-hawk, Polyboroides typus
- European honey-buzzard, Pernis apivorus (A)
- African cuckoo-hawk, Aviceda cuculoides
- White-headed vulture, Trigonoceps occipitalis
- Lappet-faced vulture, Torgos tracheliotos
- Hooded vulture, Necrosyrtes monachus
- White-backed vulture, Gyps africanus
- Cape griffon, Gyps coprotheres
- Bateleur, Terathopius ecaudatus
- Black-chested snake-eagle, Circaetus pectoralis
- Brown snake-eagle, Circaetus cinereus
- Bat hawk, Macheiramphus alcinus (A)
- Crowned eagle, Stephanoaetus coronatus
- Martial eagle, Polemaetus bellicosus
- Long-crested eagle, Lophaetus occipitalis
- Lesser spotted eagle, Clanga pomarina (A)
- Wahlberg's eagle, Hieraaetus wahlbergi
- Booted eagle, Hieraaetus pennatus
- Tawny eagle, Aquila rapax
- Steppe eagle, Aquila nipalensis
- Verreaux's eagle, Aquila verreauxii
- African hawk-eagle, Aquila spilogaster
- Lizard buzzard, Kaupifalco monogrammicus
- Dark chanting-goshawk, Melierax metabates (A)
- Gabar goshawk, Micronisus gabar
- African marsh-harrier, Circus ranivorus
- Black harrier, Circus maurus (A)
- Montagu's harrier, Circus pygargus
- African goshawk, Accipiter tachiro
- Shikra, Accipiter badius
- Little sparrowhawk, Accipiter minullus
- Ovambo sparrowhawk, Accipiter ovampensis (A)
- Rufous-breasted sparrowhawk, Accipiter rufiventris
- Black goshawk, Accipiter melanoleucus
- Black kite, Milvus migrans
- African fish-eagle, Haliaeetus vocifer
- Common buzzard, Buteo buteo
- Forest buzzard, Buteo trizonatus (A)
- Jackal buzzard, Buteo rufofuscus

== Barn-owls ==
Order: Strigiformes Family: Tytonidae

Barn-owls are medium to large owls with large heads and characteristic heart-shaped faces. They have long strong legs with powerful talons.

- African grass-owl, Tyto capensis
- Western barn owl, Tyto alba

== Owls ==
Order: Strigiformes Family: Strigidae

The typical owls are small to large solitary nocturnal birds of prey. They have large forward-facing eyes and ears, a hawk-like beak and a conspicuous circle of feathers around each eye called a facial disk.

- African scops-owl, Otus senegalensis
- Southern white-faced owl, Ptilopsis granti
- Cape eagle-owl, Bubo capensis
- Spotted eagle-owl, Bubo africanus
- Verreaux's eagle-owl, Bubo lacteus
- Pel's fishing-owl, Scotopelia peli (A)
- Pearl-spotted owlet, Glaucidium perlatum
- African barred owlet, Glaucidium capense
- African wood-owl, Strix woodfordii
- Marsh owl, Asio capensis

== Mousebirds ==
Order: Coliiformes Family: Coliidae

The mousebirds are slender greyish or brown birds with soft, hairlike body feathers and very long thin tails. They are arboreal and scurry through the leaves like rodents in search of berries, fruit and buds. They are acrobatic and can feed upside down. All species have strong claws and reversible outer toes. They also have crests and stubby bills.

- Speckled mousebird, Colius striatus
- Red-faced mousebird, Urocolius indicus

== Trogons ==
Order: Trogoniformes Family: Trogonidae

The family Trogonidae includes trogons and quetzals. Found in tropical woodlands worldwide, they feed on insects and fruit, and their broad bills and weak legs reflect their diet and arboreal habits. Although their flight is fast, they are reluctant to fly any distance. Trogons have soft, often colourful, feathers with distinctive male and female plumage.

- Narina trogon, Apaloderma narina

== Hoopoes ==
Order: Bucerotiformes Family: Upupidae

Hoopoes have black, white and orangey-pink colouring with a large erectile crest on their head.

- Eurasian hoopoe, Upupa epops

== Woodhoopoes and scimitarbills ==
Order: Bucerotiformes Family: Phoeniculidae

The woodhoopoes are related to the kingfishers, rollers and hoopoes. They most resemble the hoopoes with their long curved bills, used to probe for insects, and short rounded wings. However, they differ in that they have metallic plumage, often blue, green or purple, and lack an erectile crest.

- Green woodhoopoe, Phoeniculus purpureus
- Common scimitarbill, Rhinopomastus cyanomelas

== Ground-hornbills ==
Order: Bucerotiformes Family: Bucorvidae

The ground-hornbills are terrestrial birds which feed almost entirely on insects, other birds, snakes, and amphibians.

- Southern ground-hornbill, Bucorvus leadbeateri

== Hornbills ==
Order: Bucerotiformes Family: Bucerotidae

Hornbills are a group of birds whose bill is shaped like a cow's horn, but without a twist, sometimes with a casque on the upper mandible. Frequently, the bill is brightly coloured.

- Crowned hornbill, Lophoceros alboterminatus
- African gray hornbill, Lophoceros nasutus
- Southern yellow-billed hornbill, Tockus leucomelas
- Southern red-billed hornbill, Tockus rufirostris
- Trumpeter hornbill, Bycanistes bucinator

== Kingfishers ==
Order: Coraciiformes Family: Alcedinidae

Kingfishers are medium-sized birds with large heads, long, pointed bills, short legs and stubby tails.

- Half-collared kingfisher, Alcedo semitorquata
- Malachite kingfisher, Corythornis cristatus
- African pygmy kingfisher, Ispidina picta
- Gray-headed kingfisher, Halcyon leucocephala
- Woodland kingfisher, Halcyon senegalensis
- Brown-hooded kingfisher, Halcyon albiventris
- Striped kingfisher, Halcyon chelicuti
- Giant kingfisher, Megaceryle maximus
- Pied kingfisher, Ceryle rudis

== Bee-eaters ==
Order: Coraciiformes Family: Meropidae

The bee-eaters are a group of near passerine birds in the family Meropidae. Most species are found in Africa but others occur in southern Europe, Madagascar, Australia and New Guinea. They are characterised by richly coloured plumage, slender bodies and usually elongated central tail feathers. All are colourful and have long downturned bills and pointed wings, which give them a swallow-like appearance when seen from afar.

- White-fronted bee-eater, Merops bullockoides
- Little bee-eater, Merops pusillus
- Swallow-tailed bee-eater, Merops hirundineus (A)
- Blue-cheeked bee-eater, Merops persicus
- European bee-eater, Merops apiaster
- Southern carmine bee-eater, Merops nubicoides

== Rollers ==
Order: Coraciiformes Family: Coraciidae

Rollers resemble crows in size and build, but are more closely related to the kingfishers and bee-eaters. They share the colourful appearance of those groups with blues and browns predominating. The two inner front toes are connected, but the outer toe is not.

- European roller, Coracias garrulus
- Lilac-breasted roller, Coracias caudata
- Rufous-crowned roller, Coracias naevia
- Broad-billed roller, Eurystomus glaucurus

== African barbets ==
Order: Piciformes Family: Lybiidae

The African barbets are plump birds, with short necks and large heads. They get their name from the bristles which fringe their heavy bills. Most species are brightly coloured.

- Crested barbet, Trachyphonus vaillantii
- White-eared barbet, Stactolaema leucotis (A)
- Yellow-rumped tinkerbird, Pogoniulus bilineatus
- Red-fronted tinkerbird, Pogoniulus pusillus
- Yellow-fronted tinkerbird, Pogoniulus chrysoconus
- Pied barbet, Tricholaema leucomelas
- Black-collared barbet, Lybius torquatus

== Honeyguides ==
Order: Piciformes Family: Indicatoridae

Honeyguides are among the few birds that feed on wax. They are named for the greater honeyguide which leads traditional honey-hunters to bees' nests and, after the hunters have harvested the honey, feeds on the remaining contents of the hive.

- Wahlberg's honeyguide, Prodotiscus regulus
- Lesser honeyguide, Indicator minor
- Scaly-throated honeyguide, Indicator variegatus
- Greater honeyguide, Indicator indicator

== Woodpeckers ==
Order: Piciformes Family: Picidae

Woodpeckers are small to medium-sized birds with chisel-like beaks, short legs, stiff tails and long tongues used for capturing insects. Some species have feet with two toes pointing forward and two backward, while several species have only three toes. Many woodpeckers have the habit of tapping noisily on tree trunks with their beaks.

- Rufous-necked wryneck, Jynx ruficollis
- Cardinal woodpecker, Chloropicus fuscescens
- Bearded woodpecker, Chloropicus namaquus
- Olive woodpecker, Chloropicus griseocephalus
- Ground woodpecker, Geocolaptes olivaceus
- Bennett's woodpecker, Campethera bennettii
- Golden-tailed woodpecker, Campethera abingoni

== Falcons and caracaras ==
Order: Falconiformes Family: Falconidae

Falconidae is a family of diurnal birds of prey. They differ from hawks, eagles and kites in that they kill with their beaks instead of their talons.

- Lesser kestrel, Falco naumanni (A)
- Rock kestrel, Falco rupicolus
- Red-footed falcon, Falco vespertinus (A)
- Amur falcon, Falco amurensis
- Eurasian hobby, Falco subbuteo
- Lanner falcon, Falco biarmicus
- Peregrine falcon, Falco peregrinus

== Old World parrots ==
Order: Psittaciformes Family: Psittaculidae

Characteristic features of parrots include a strong curved bill, an upright stance, strong legs, and clawed zygodactyl feet. Many parrots are vividly colored, and some are multi-colored. In size they range from 8 cm (3.1 in) to 1 m (3.3 ft) in length. Old World parrots are found from Africa east across south and southeast Asia and Oceania to Australia and New Zealand.

- Rose-ringed parakeet, Psittacula krameri (I)

== New World and African parrots ==
Order: Psittaciformes Family: Psittacidae

New World and African parrots are small to large birds with a characteristic curved beak. Their upper mandibles have slight mobility in the joint with the skull and they have a generally erect stance. All parrots are zygodactyl, having the four toes on each foot placed two at the front and two to the back.

- Meyer's parrot, Poicephalus meyeri (A)
- Brown-headed parrot, Poicephalus cryptoxanthus

== African and green broadbills ==
Order: Passeriformes Family: Calyptomenidae

The broadbills are small, brightly coloured birds, which feed on fruit and also take insects in flycatcher fashion, snapping their broad bills. Their habitat is canopies of wet forests.

- African broadbill, Smithornis capensis

== Cuckooshrikes ==
Order: Passeriformes Family: Campephagidae

The cuckooshrikes are small to medium-sized passerine birds. They are predominantly greyish with white and black, although some species are brightly coloured.

- Gray cuckooshrike, Coracina caesia
- White-breasted cuckooshrike, Coracina pectoralis (A)
- Black cuckooshrike, Campephaga flava

== Old World orioles ==
Order: Passeriformes Family: Oriolidae

The Old World orioles are colourful passerine birds. They are not related to the New World orioles.

- Eurasian golden oriole, Oriolus oriolus
- African black-headed oriole, Oriolus larvatus

== Wattle-eyes and batises ==
Order: Passeriformes Family: Platysteiridae

The wattle-eyes, or puffback flycatchers, are small stout passerine birds of the African tropics. They get their name from the brightly coloured fleshy eye decorations found in most species in this group.

- Black-throated wattle-eye, Platysteira peltata (A)
- Cape batis, Batis capensis
- Chinspot batis, Batis molitor

== Vangas, helmetshrikes, and allies ==
Order: Passeriformes Family: Vangidae

The helmetshrikes are similar in build to the shrikes, but tend to be colourful species with distinctive crests or other head ornaments, such as wattles, from which they get their name.

- White helmetshrike, Prionops plumatus
- Retz's helmetshrike, Prionops retzii

== Bushshrikes and allies ==
Order: Passeriformes Family: Malaconotidae

Bushshrikes are similar in habits to shrikes, hunting insects and other small prey from a perch on a bush. Although similar in build to the shrikes, these tend to be either colourful species or largely black; some species are quite secretive.

- Brubru, Nilaus afer
- Black-backed puffback, Dryoscopus cubla
- Black-crowned tchagra, Tchagra senegala
- Brown-crowned tchagra, Tchagra australis
- Southern tchagra, Tchagra tchagra
- Southern boubou, Laniarius ferrugineus
- Bokmakierie, Telophorus zeylonus
- Sulphur-breasted bushshrike, Telophorus sulfureopectus
- Olive bushshrike, Telophorus olivaceus
- Four-colored bushshrike, Telophorus viridis
- Gray-headed bushshrike, Malaconotus blanchoti

== Drongos ==
Order: Passeriformes Family: Dicruridae

The drongos are mostly black or dark grey in colour, sometimes with metallic tints. They have long forked tails, and some Asian species have elaborate tail decorations. They have short legs and sit very upright when perched, like a shrike. They flycatch or take prey from the ground.

- Common square-tailed drongo, Dicrurus ludwigii
- Fork-tailed drongo, Dicrurus adsimilis

== Monarch flycatchers ==
Order: Passeriformes Family: Monarchidae

The monarch flycatchers are small to medium-sized insectivorous passerines which hunt by flycatching.

- African crested-flycatcher, Trochocercus cyanomelas
- African paradise-flycatcher, Terpsiphone viridis

== Shrikes ==
Order: Passeriformes Family: Laniidae

Shrikes are passerine birds known for their habit of catching other birds and small animals and impaling the uneaten portions of their bodies on thorns. A typical shrike's beak is hooked, like a bird of prey.

- Red-backed shrike, Lanius collurio
- Lesser grey shrike, Lanius minor
- Magpie shrike, Lanius melanoleucus
- Southern fiscal, Lanius collaris

== Crows, jays, and magpies ==
Order: Passeriformes Family: Corvidae

The family Corvidae includes crows, ravens, jays, choughs, magpies, treepies, nutcrackers and ground jays. Corvids are above average in size among the Passeriformes, and some of the larger species show high levels of intelligence.

- Cape crow, Corvus capensis
- Pied crow, Corvus albus
- White-necked raven, Corvus albicollis

== Fairy flycatchers ==
Order: Passeriformes Family: Stenostiridae

Most of the species of this small family are found in Africa, though a few inhabit tropical Asia. They are not closely related to other birds called "flycatchers".

- Fairy flycatcher, Stenostira scita (A)

== Tits, chickadees, and titmice ==
Order: Passeriformes Family: Paridae

The Paridae are mainly small stocky woodland species with short stout bills. Some have crests. They are adaptable birds, with a mixed diet including seeds and insects.

- Southern black-tit, Melaniparus niger

== Penduline-tits ==
Order: Passeriformes Family: Remizidae

The penduline-tits are a group of small passerine birds related to the true tits. They are insectivores.

- African penduline-tit, Anthoscopus caroli

== Larks ==
Order: Passeriformes Family: Alaudidae

Larks are small terrestrial birds with often extravagant songs and display flights. Most larks are fairly dull in appearance. Their food is insects and seeds.

- Eastern long-billed lark, Certhilauda semitorquata
- Dusky lark, Pinarocorys nigricans (A)
- Chestnut-backed sparrow-lark, Eremopterix leucotis
- Sabota lark, Calendulauda sabota
- Rudd's lark, Heteromirafra ruddi
- Rufous-naped lark, Mirafra africana
- Flappet lark, Mirafra rufocinnamomea
- Red-capped lark, Calandrella cinerea

== Nicators ==
Order: Passeriformes Family: Nicatoridae

The nicators are shrike-like, with hooked bills. They are endemic to sub-Saharan Africa.

- Eastern nicator, Nicator gularis

== African warblers ==
Order: Passeriformes Family: Macrosphenidae

African warblers are small to medium-sized insectivores which are found in a wide variety of habitats south of the Sahara.

- Cape crombec, Sylvietta rufescens
- Cape grassbird, Sphenoeacus afer

== Cisticolas and allies ==
Order: Passeriformes Family: Cisticolidae

The Cisticolidae are warblers found mainly in warmer southern regions of the Old World. They are generally very small birds of drab brown or grey appearance found in open country such as grassland or scrub.

- Yellow-bellied eremomela, Eremomela icteropygialis
- Greencap eremomela, Eremomela scotops (A)
- Burnt-neck eremomela, Eremomela usticollis
- Stierling's wren-warbler, Calamonastes stierlingi
- Green-backed camaroptera, Camaroptera brachyura
- Bar-throated apalis, Apalis thoracica
- Yellow-breasted apalis, Apalis flavida
- Rudd's apalis, Apalis ruddi
- Tawny-flanked prinia, Prinia subflava
- Karoo prinia, Prinia maculosa
- Drakensberg prinia, Prinia hypoxantha
- Red-faced cisticola, Cisticola erythrops
- Rock-loving cisticola, Cisticola aberrans
- Rattling cisticola, Cisticola chiniana
- Wailing cisticola, Cisticola lais
- Levaillant's cisticola, Cisticola tinniens
- Croaking cisticola, Cisticola natalensis
- Piping cisticola, Cisticola fulvicapillus
- Zitting cisticola, Cisticola juncidis
- Desert cisticola, Cisticola aridulus
- Cloud cisticola, Cisticola textrix
- Pale-crowned cisticola, Cisticola cinnamomeus
- Wing-snapping cisticola, Cisticola ayresii

== Reed warblers and allies ==
Order: Passeriformes Family: Acrocephalidae

The members of this family are usually rather large for "warblers". Most are rather plain olivaceous brown above with much yellow to beige below. They are usually found in open woodland, reedbeds, or tall grass. The family occurs mostly in southern to western Eurasia and surroundings, but it also ranges far into the Pacific, with some species in Africa.

- African yellow-warbler, Iduna natalensis
- Icterine warbler, Hippolais icterina
- Sedge warbler, Acrocephalus schoenobaenus
- Marsh warbler, Acrocephalus palustris
- Common reed warbler, Acrocephalus scirpaceus
- Lesser swamp warbler, Acrocephalus gracilirostris
- Great reed warbler, Acrocephalus arundinaceus

== Grassbirds and allies ==
Order: Passeriformes Family: Locustellidae

Locustellidae are a family of small insectivorous songbirds found mainly in Eurasia, Africa, and the Australian region. They are smallish birds with tails that are usually long and pointed, and tend to be drab brownish or buffy all over.

- River warbler, Locustella fluviatilis (A)
- Fan-tailed grassbird, Catriscus brevirostris
- Little rush warbler, Bradypterus baboecala

== Swallows ==
Order: Passeriformes Family: Hirundinidae

The family Hirundinidae is adapted to aerial feeding. They have a slender streamlined body, long pointed wings and a short bill with a wide gape. The feet are adapted to perching rather than walking, and the front toes are partially joined at the base.

- Plain martin, Riparia paludicola
- Bank swallow, Riparia riparia
- Banded martin, Neophedina cincta
- Rock martin, Ptyonoprogne fuligula
- Barn swallow, Hirundo rustica
- White-throated swallow, Hirundo albigularis
- Wire-tailed swallow, Hirundo smithii
- Pearl-breasted swallow, Hirundo dimidiata
- Montane blue swallow, Hirundo atrocaerulea
- Greater striped swallow, Cecropis cucullata
- Lesser striped swallow, Cecropis abyssinica
- Rufous-chested swallow, Cecropis semirufa
- Mosque swallow, Cecropis senegalensis (A)
- Common house-martin, Delichon urbicum
- Black sawwing, Psalidoprocne pristoptera
- Gray-rumped swallow, Pseudhirundo griseopyga

== Bulbuls ==
Order: Passeriformes Family: Pycnonotidae

Bulbuls are medium-sized songbirds. Some are colourful with yellow, red or orange vents, cheeks, throats or supercilia, but most are drab, with uniform olive-brown to black plumage. Some species have distinct crests.

- Sombre greenbul, Andropadus importunus
- Yellow-bellied greenbul, Chlorocichla flaviventris (A)
- Terrestrial brownbul, Phyllastrephus terrestris
- Yellow-streaked greenbul, Phyllastrephus flavostriatus
- Common bulbul, Pycnonotus barbatus

== Leaf warblers ==
Order: Passeriformes Family: Phylloscopidae

Leaf warblers are a family of small insectivorous birds found mostly in Eurasia and ranging into Wallacea and Africa. The species are of various sizes, often green-plumaged above and yellow below, or more subdued with grayish-green to grayish-brown colors.

- Willow warbler, Phylloscopus trochilus
- Yellow-throated woodland-warbler, Phylloscopus ruficapillus

== Sylviid warblers, parrotbills, and allies ==
Order: Passeriformes Family: Sylviidae

The family Sylviidae is a group of small insectivorous passerine birds. They mainly occur as breeding species, as the common name implies, in Europe, Asia and, to a lesser extent, Africa. Most are of generally undistinguished appearance, but many have distinctive songs.

- Garden warbler, Sylvia borin
- Bush blackcap, Sylvia nigricapillus (A)
- Chestnut-vented warbler, Curruca subcoerulea
- Greater whitethroat, Curruca communis

== White-eyes, yuhinas, and allies ==
Order: Passeriformes Family: Zosteropidae

The white-eyes are small and mostly undistinguished, their plumage above being generally some dull colour like greenish-olive, but some species have a white or bright yellow throat, breast or lower parts, and several have buff flanks. As their name suggests, many species have a white ring around each eye.

- Cape white-eye, Zosterops virens
- Southern yellow white-eye, Zosterops anderssoni

== Laughingthrushes and allies ==
Order: Passeriformes Family: Leiothrichidae

The members of this family are diverse in size and colouration, though those of genus Turdoides tend to be brown or greyish. The family is found in Africa, India, and southeast Asia.

- Arrow-marked babbler, Turdoides jardineii

== Oxpeckers ==
Order: Passeriformes Family: Buphagidae

As both the English and scientific names of these birds imply, they feed on ectoparasites, primarily ticks, found on large mammals.

- Red-billed oxpecker, Buphagus erythrorynchus
- Yellow-billed oxpecker, Buphagus africanus (Ex)

== Starlings ==
Order: Passeriformes Family: Sturnidae

Starlings are small to medium-sized passerine birds. Their flight is strong and direct and they are very gregarious. Their preferred habitat is fairly open country. They eat insects and fruit. Plumage is typically dark with a metallic sheen.

- Wattled starling, Creatophora cinerea (A)
- Common myna, Acridotheres tristis (I)
- Violet-backed starling, Cinnyricinclus leucogaster
- Red-winged starling, Onychognathus morio
- Black-bellied starling, Notopholia corrusca
- Burchell's starling, Lamprotornis australis
- African pied starling, Lamprotornis bicolor
- Cape starling, Lamprotornis nitens

== Thrushes and allies ==
Order: Passeriformes Family: Turdidae

The thrushes are a group of passerine birds that occur mainly in the Old World. They are plump, soft plumaged, small to medium-sized insectivores or sometimes omnivores, often feeding on the ground. Many have attractive songs.

- Orange ground-thrush, Geokichla gurneyi
- Groundscraper thrush, Turdus litsitsirupa
- Kurrichane thrush, Turdus libonyana
- Olive thrush, Turdus olivaceus

== Old World flycatchers ==
Order: Passeriformes Family: Muscicapidae

Old World flycatchers are a large group of small passerine birds native to the Old World. They are mainly small arboreal insectivores. The appearance of these birds is highly varied, but they mostly have weak songs and harsh calls.

- African dusky flycatcher, Muscicapa adusta
- Spotted flycatcher, Muscicapa striata
- Pale flycatcher, Agricola pallidus
- Gray tit-flycatcher, Fraseria plumbea
- Ashy flycatcher, Fraseria caerulescens
- Fiscal flycatcher, Melaenornis silens
- Southern black-flycatcher, Melaenornis pammelaina
- Brown scrub-robin, Cercotrichas signata (A)
- Bearded scrub-robin, Cercotrichas quadrivirgata
- Red-backed scrub-robin, Cercotrichas leucophrys
- Cape robin-chat, Cossypha caffra
- White-throated robin-chat, Cossypha humeralis
- White-browed robin-chat, Cossypha heuglini
- Red-capped robin-chat, Cossypha natalensis
- Chorister robin-chat, Cossypha dichroa
- White-starred robin, Pogonocichla stellata
- Sentinel rock-thrush, Monticola explorator
- Cape rock-thrush, Monticola rupestris
- African stonechat, Saxicola torquatus
- Buff-streaked chat, Campicoloides bifasciatus
- Mocking cliff-chat, Thamnolaea cinnamomeiventris
- Southern anteater-chat, Myrmecocichla formicivora (A)
- Mountain wheatear, Myrmecocichla monticola
- Capped wheatear, Oenanthe pileata (A)
- Familiar chat, Oenanthe familiaris

== Sugarbirds ==
Order: Passeriformes Family: Promeropidae

The sugarbirds resemble large sunbirds in general appearance and habits, but are possibly more closely related to the Australian honeyeaters. They have brownish plumage, the long downcurved bill of passerine nectar feeders and long tail feathers.

- Gurney's sugarbird, Promerops gurneyi

== Sunbirds and spiderhunters ==
Order: Passeriformes Family: Nectariniidae

The sunbirds and spiderhunters are very small passerine birds which feed largely on nectar, although they will also take insects, especially when feeding young. Flight is fast and direct on their short wings. Most species can take nectar by hovering like a hummingbird, but usually perch to feed.

- Collared sunbird, Hedydipna collaris
- Olive sunbird, Cyanomitra olivacea
- Mouse-coloured sunbird, Cyanomitra veroxii
- Amethyst sunbird, Chalcomitra amethystina
- Scarlet-chested sunbird, Chalcomitra senegalensis
- Malachite sunbird, Nectarinia famosa
- Southern double-collared sunbird, Cinnyris chalybeus
- Greater double-collared sunbird, Cinnyris afer
- Mariqua sunbird, Cinnyris mariquensis
- Purple-banded sunbird, Cinnyris bifasciatus
- White-breasted sunbird, Cinnyris talatala

== Weavers and allies ==
Order: Passeriformes Family: Ploceidae

The weavers are small passerine birds related to the finches. They are seed-eating birds with rounded conical bills. The males of many species are brightly coloured, usually in red or yellow and black, some species show variation in colour only in the breeding season.

- Red-billed buffalo-weaver, Bubalornis niger
- Red-headed weaver, Anaplectes rubriceps
- Spectacled weaver, Ploceus ocularis
- Cape weaver, Ploceus capensis
- African golden-weaver, Ploceus subaureus
- Holub's golden-weaver, Ploceus xanthops
- Southern brown-throated weaver, Ploceus xanthopterus (A)
- Lesser masked-weaver, Ploceus intermedius
- Southern masked-weaver, Ploceus velatus
- Village weaver, Ploceus cucullatus
- Forest weaver, Ploceus bicolor
- Red-headed quelea, Quelea erythrops
- Red-billed quelea, Quelea quelea
- Southern red bishop, Euplectes orix
- Yellow-crowned bishop, Euplectes afer (A)
- Yellow bishop, Euplectes capensis
- White-winged widowbird, Euplectes albonotatus
- Red-collared widowbird, Euplectes ardens
- Fan-tailed widowbird, Euplectes axillaris
- Long-tailed widowbird, Euplectes progne
- Grosbeak weaver, Amblyospiza albifrons

== Waxbills and allies ==
Order: Passeriformes Family: Estrildidae

The estrildid finches are small passerine birds of the Old World tropics and Australasia. They are gregarious and often colonial seed eaters with short thick but pointed bills. They are all similar in structure and habits, but have wide variation in plumage colours and patterns.

- Bronze mannikin, Spermestes cucullatus
- Magpie mannikin, Spermestes fringilloides
- Black-and-white mannikin, Spermestes bicolor
- Swee waxbill, Coccopygia melanotis
- Green-backed twinspot, Mandingoa nitidula
- Black-tailed waxbill, Glaucestrilda perreini (A)
- Common waxbill, Estrilda astrild
- Quailfinch, Ortygospiza atricollis
- Cut-throat, Amadina fasciata
- Zebra waxbill, Amandava subflava
- Southern cordonbleu, Uraeginthus angolensis
- Green-winged pytilia, Pytilia melba
- Pink-throated twinspot, Hypargos margaritatus
- Red-billed firefinch, Lagonosticta senegala
- African firefinch, Lagonosticta rubricata
- Jameson's firefinch, Lagonosticta rhodopareia

== Indigobirds ==
Order: Passeriformes Family: Viduidae

The indigobirds are finch-like species which usually have black or indigo predominating in their plumage. All are brood parasites, which lay their eggs in the nests of estrildid finches.

- Pin-tailed whydah, Vidua macroura
- Eastern paradise-whydah, Vidua paradisaea
- Village indigobird, Vidua chalybeata
- Variable indigobird, Vidua funerea
- Purple indigobird, Vidua purpurascens
- Parasitic weaver, Anomalospiza imberbis

== Old World sparrows ==
Order: Passeriformes Family: Passeridae

Old World sparrows are small passerine birds. In general, sparrows tend to be small, plump, brown or grey birds with short tails and short powerful beaks. Sparrows are seed eaters, but they also consume small insects.

- House sparrow, Passer domesticus (I)
- Great rufous sparrow, Passer motitensis
- Cape sparrow, Passer melanurus (A)
- Southern gray-headed sparrow, Passer diffusus
- Yellow-throated bush sparrow, Gymnoris superciliaris

== Wagtails and pipits ==
Order: Passeriformes Family: Motacillidae

Motacillidae is a family of small passerine birds with medium to long tails. They include the wagtails, longclaws and pipits. They are slender, ground feeding insectivores of open country.

- Cape wagtail, Motacilla capensis
- Mountain wagtail, Motacilla clara
- Western yellow wagtail, Motacilla flava
- African pied wagtail, Motacilla aguimp
- African pipit, Anthus cinnamomeus
- Nicholson's pipit, Anthus nicholsoni
- Plain-backed pipit, Anthus leucophrys
- Buffy pipit, Anthus vaalensis
- Striped pipit, Anthus lineiventris
- Yellow-tufted pipit, Anthus crenatus
- Short-tailed pipit, Anthus brachyurus
- Bush pipit, Anthus caffer
- Orange-throated longclaw, Macronyx capensis
- Yellow-throated longclaw, Macronyx croceus

== Finches, euphonias, and allies ==
Order: Passeriformes Family: Fringillidae

Finches are seed-eating passerine birds, that are small to moderately large and have a strong beak, usually conical and in some species very large. All have twelve tail feathers and nine primaries. These birds have a bouncing flight with alternating bouts of flapping and gliding on closed wings, and most sing well.

- Yellow-fronted canary, Crithagra mozambicus
- Forest canary, Crithagra scotops
- Black-throated canary, Crithagra atrogularis
- Brimstone canary, Crithagra sulphuratus
- Yellow canary, Crithagra flaviventris (A)
- Streaky-headed seedeater, Crithagra gularis
- Cape canary, Serinus canicollis

== Old World buntings ==
Order: Passeriformes Family: Emberizidae

The emberizids are a large family of passerine birds. They are seed-eating birds with distinctively shaped bills. Many emberizid species have distinctive head patterns.

- Golden-breasted bunting, Emberiza flaviventris
- Cape bunting, Emberiza capensis
- Lark-like bunting, Emberiza impetuani (A)
- Cinnamon-breasted bunting, Emberiza tahapisi

== See also ==
- List of birds
- Lists of birds by region
