= Lubombo Conservancy =

Coordinates: 26.25°S 31.88°E

Lubombo Conservancy comprises 5 reserves in Eswatini:

- Hlane Royal National Park
- Mbuluzi Game Reserve
- Mlawula Nature Reserve
- Shewula Community Nature Reserve
- Nkhalashane Siza Ranch

These areas, comprising about 60,000 hectares, include statutorily proclaimed protected areas, private property, and Swazi nation land.
