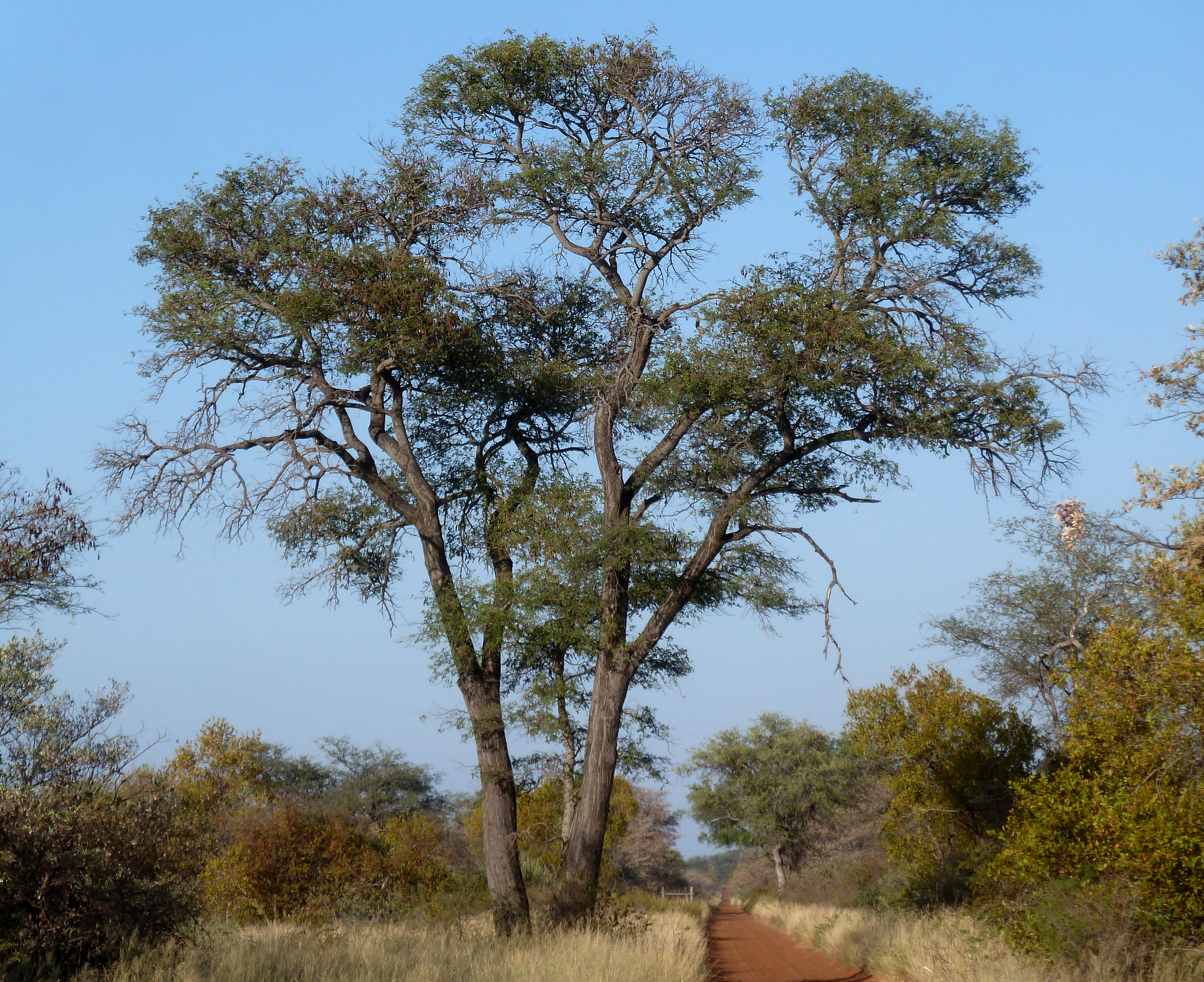
- In Limpopo, South Africa

Conservation status
- Least Concern (IUCN 3.1)

Scientific classification
- Kingdom: Plantae
- Clade: Embryophytes
- Clade: Tracheophytes
- Clade: Angiosperms
- Clade: Eudicots
- Clade: Rosids
- Order: Fabales
- Family: Fabaceae
- Subfamily: Caesalpinioideae
- Clade: Mimosoid clade
- Genus: Senegalia
- Species: S. nigrescens

Binomial name
- Senegalia nigrescens (Oliv.) P.J.H.Hurter

Synonyms
- Acacia nigrescens Oliv.

= Senegalia nigrescens =

Species of legume

Senegalia nigrescens, the knobthorn, is a deciduous African tree, growing up to 18 m tall, that is found in savanna regions from West Africa to South Africa. The tree is resistant to drought, not resistant to frost and its hard wood is resistant to termites.

== Ecology ==
Giraffes often browse on the flowers and foliage of this tree, while the seed pods and foliage are browsed on by a range of mammals, including elephants.

It has been hypothesized that giraffes also act as pollinators. Its spicate inflorescences are too long to be protected by thorns and lack any chemical defenses, its flowers are pale rather than brightly colored as is typical of insect-pollinated species, and it blooms in the late dry season in September when other foods are less available. However, observed reductions in fruit set within feeding range of the giraffe suggest predation rather than pollination, with effective pollination more likely performed by insects or birds.

== Uses ==
An ointment made from the roots has traditionally been used to treat convulsions.

== Gallery ==
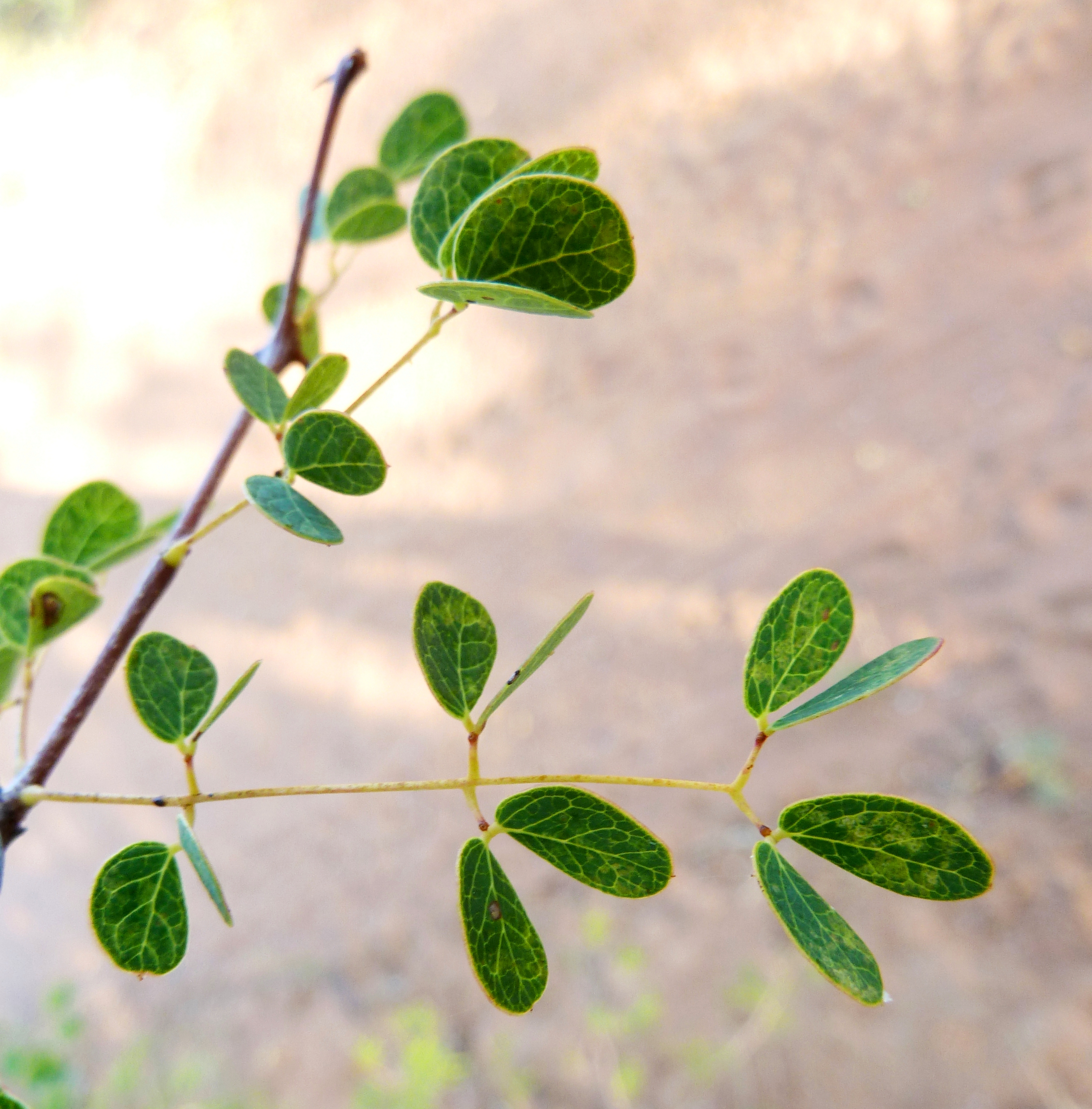
compound leaves

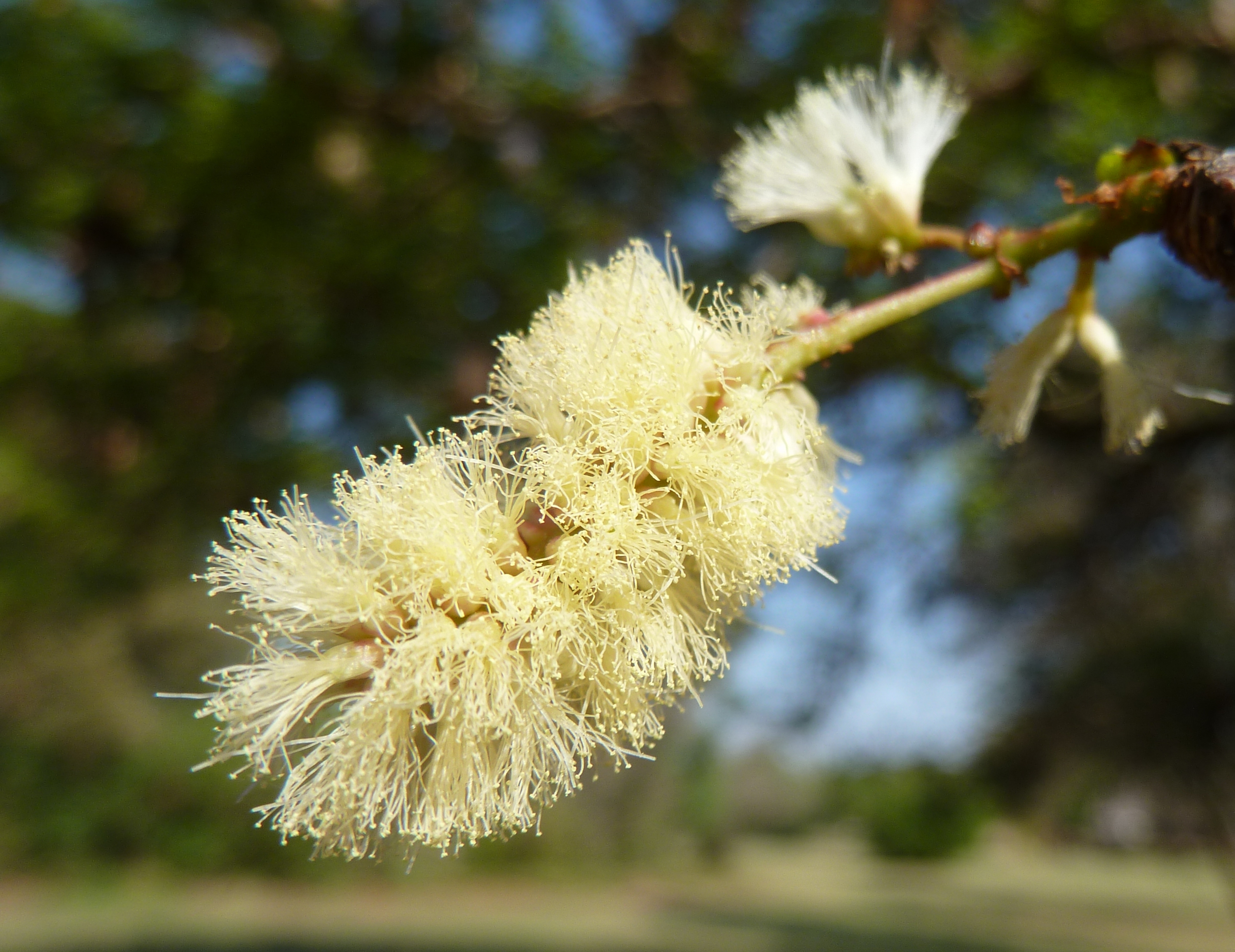
flower spike

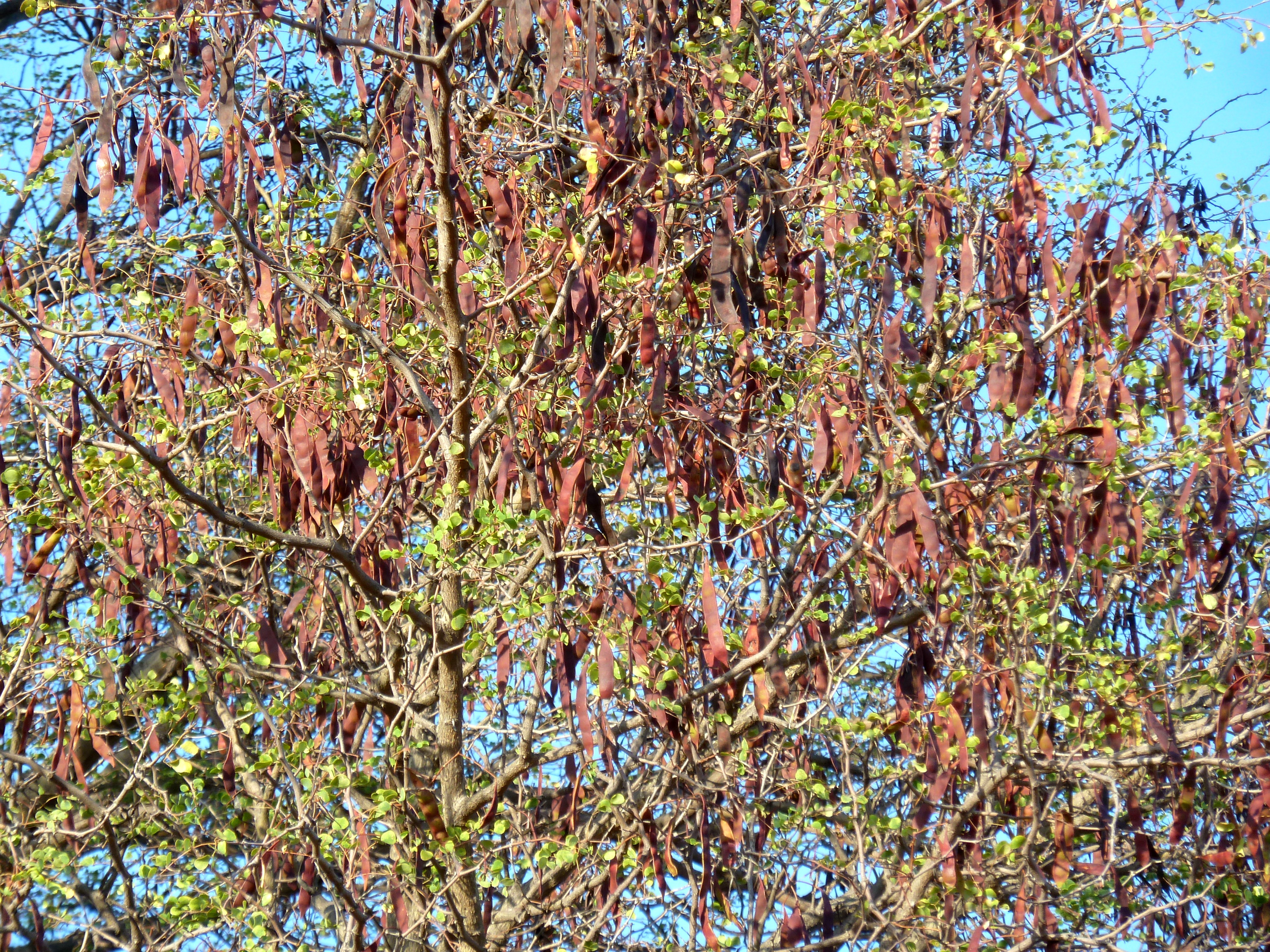
rufous seed pods

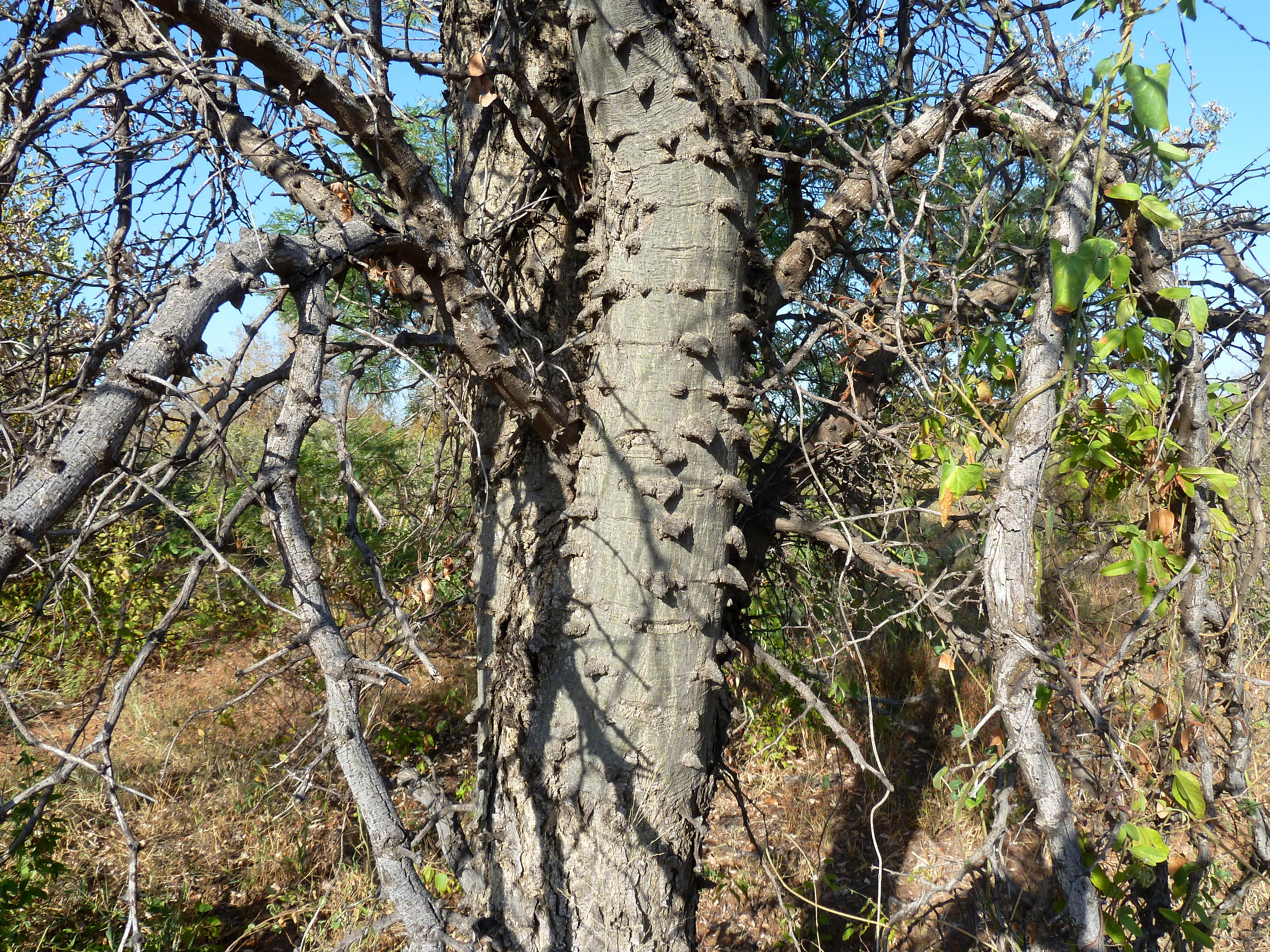
knobbly bark
