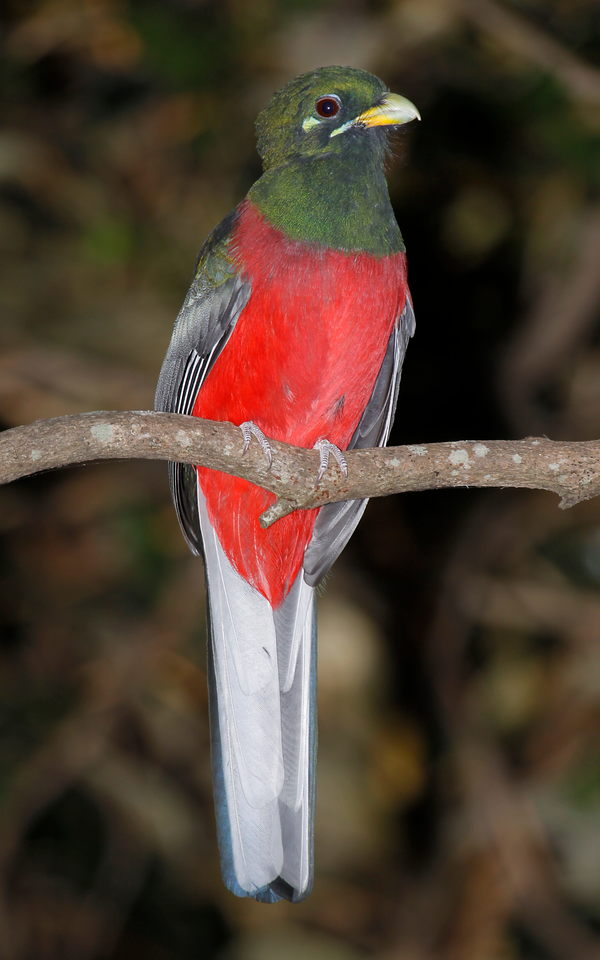
- Adult male in South Africa

Conservation status
- Least Concern (IUCN 3.1)

Scientific classification
- Kingdom: Animalia
- Phylum: Chordata
- Class: Aves
- Order: Trogoniformes
- Family: Trogonidae
- Genus: Apaloderma
- Species: A. narina

Binomial name
- Apaloderma narina (Stephens, 1815)

= Narina trogon =

Species of bird

The Narina trogon (Apaloderma narina) is a largely green and red, medium-sized (32–34 cm long) bird in the family Trogonidae. It is native to forests and woodlands of the Afrotropics. Though it is the most widespread and diverse in habitat choice of the three Apaloderma species, its numbers are locally depleted due to deforestation. Some populations are sedentary while others undertake regular movements.

== Description ==
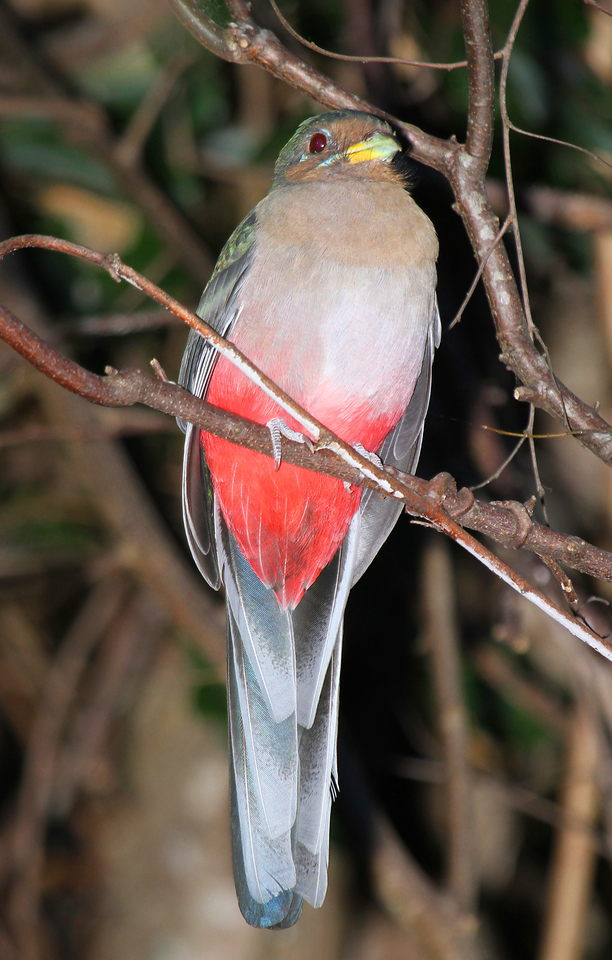
Female in South Africa

It is sexually dimorphic, with males more brightly coloured. Both sexes have vivid, gingery green upperpart plumage. The tail feathers have a metallic blue-green gloss. The outer three rectices on each side are tipped and fringed white, giving the undertail of perched birds a characteristic white appearance (compare bar-tailed trogon). The wing coverts are a grizzled grey, and remiges mostly colourless grey.

The male especially, has bright red underside plumage and bare, green gape and eye flanges. The female has brown face and chest plumage, blue skin orbiting the eyes and duller red plumage below. Immature birds resemble females but have distinct white tips to the tertials (inner wing), and less distinct gape and eye flanges.

The name is derived from the Khoi word for flower that was noted by Francois Levaillant in his description of the bird. He also used the name Narina for his Gonaqua mistress.

== Range and habitat ==
The species has a large range in Africa, inhabiting lowland to highland, valley and riparian forests, from tropical to temperate regions, those occurring in highlands dispersing seasonally to lower levels. It is found from Sierra Leone to Ethiopia, and east Africa to eastern and southern South Africa. Due to its wide range and varied habitat choice, the Narina trogon is considered to be a species of least conservation concern.

== Habits and nesting ==
The diet consists mainly of insects and small invertebrates as well as rodents and small reptiles. The call is a grating, low repeated hoot, given by males only, in defending territory or attracting mates. The male's bare, blue-green throat patch is expanded when calling and both sexes may fluff out the breast feathers in display. They nest in a tree hollow in which both sexes incubate or brood.

== Subspecies ==
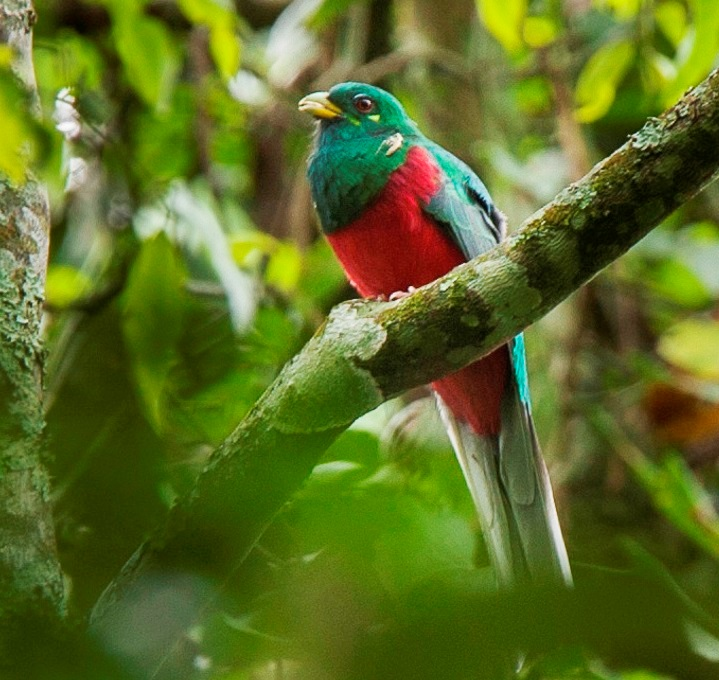
A. narina narina in southern Uganda

There are four to six accepted subspecies; the AviList and IOC accept four:

- Apaloderma narina constantia Sharpe & Ussher, 1872

Range: Sierra Leone, Liberia, and southern Guinea (Mount Nimba) to Ghana

- Apaloderma narina brachyurum Chapin, 1923

Range: southeastern Nigeria and southern Cameroon to Democratic Republic of the Congo, Uganda, and the Kenya Rift Valley

- Apaloderma narina narina (Stephens, 1815) – Type from Knysna, South Africa

Range: highlands of Ethiopia to Angola and South Africa

- Apaloderma narina littorale van Someren, 1931 – Type from Sokoke Forest

Range: coastal lowlands from Somalia to KwaZulu-Natal, including Zanzibar

Two additional subspecies are accepted by some authors; these are both considered synonyms of nominate A. n. narina by IOC and AviList:

- Apaloderma narina arcanum Clancey, 1959

Range: Chad to n Kenya

- Apaloderma narina rufiventre A.J.C.Dubois, 1897 – Type from Mpala, DRC

Range: s DRC to s Uganda, Tanzania, Malawi, Namibia, Botswana and Zambia to Eastern Highlands
