= Hlane Royal National Park =

National park in Eswatini

- IUCN category VI (protected area with sustainable use of natural resources)
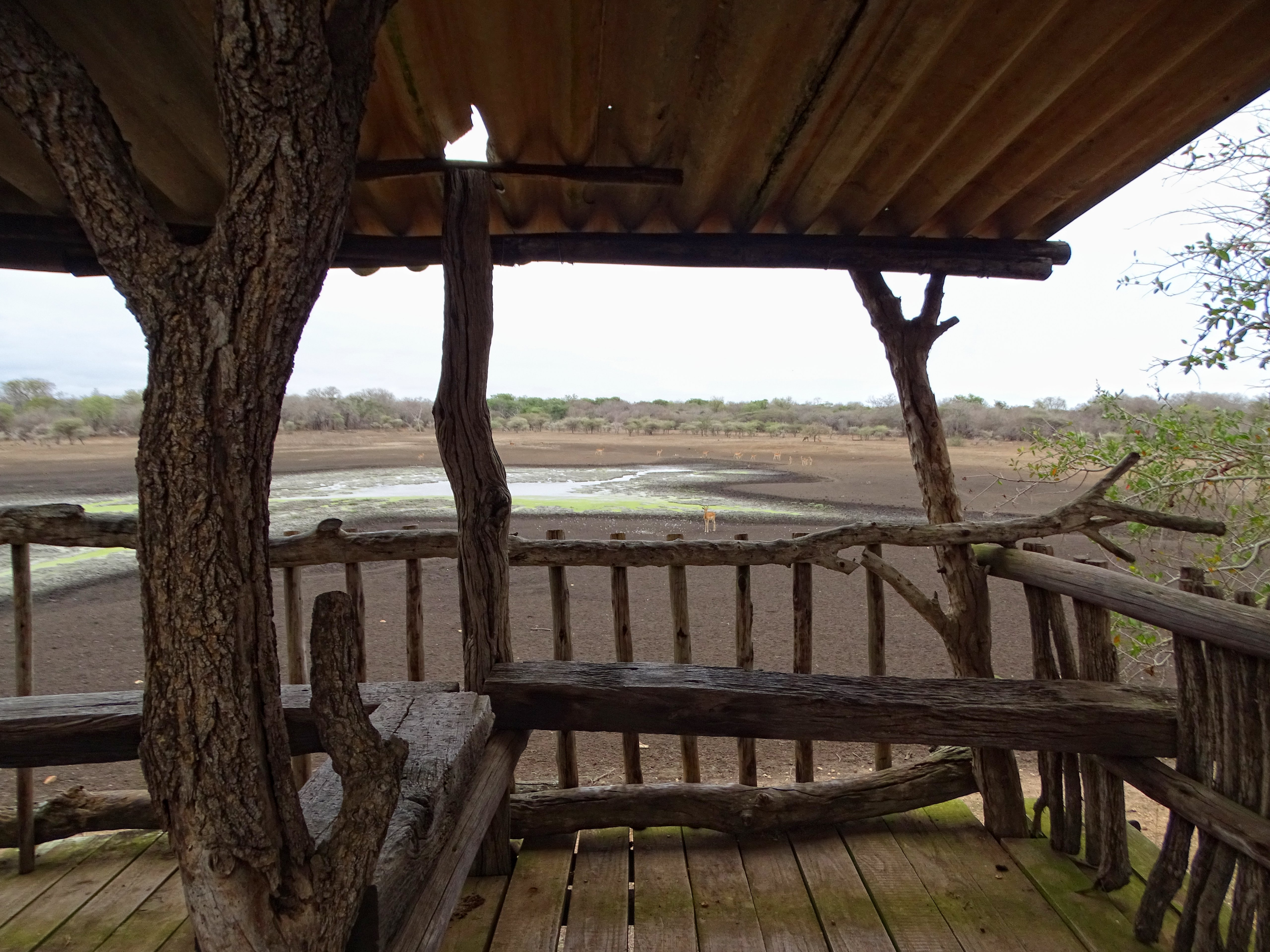
- Basic facilities at a hide overlooking Hippo Pool in the southern part of the park.

- Location within Eswatini
- Interactive map of Hlane Royal National Park
- Location: Eswatini
- Coordinates: 26°15′S 31°53′E
- Area: 300 km^{2} (120 sq mi)

Hlane Royal National Park is a national park in Eswatini, roughly 67 km northeast of Manzini along the MR3 road. Prior to being designated a public park, it was a private royal hunting ground. Hlane, meaning 'wilderness', was named by King Sobhuza II. It is now held in trust for the nation by His Majesty King Mswati III, and is managed by Big Game Parks, a privately owned body.

== Features ==
It is Eswatini's largest protected area and park. The park and its adjacent dispersal areas cover 300 km^{2} (120 sq mi) of Swazi bushveld. It is a flat lowland area, covered with ancient hardwood trees like knobthorn, leadwood and tambuti, with some grasslands and shallow pans.

=== Fauna ===
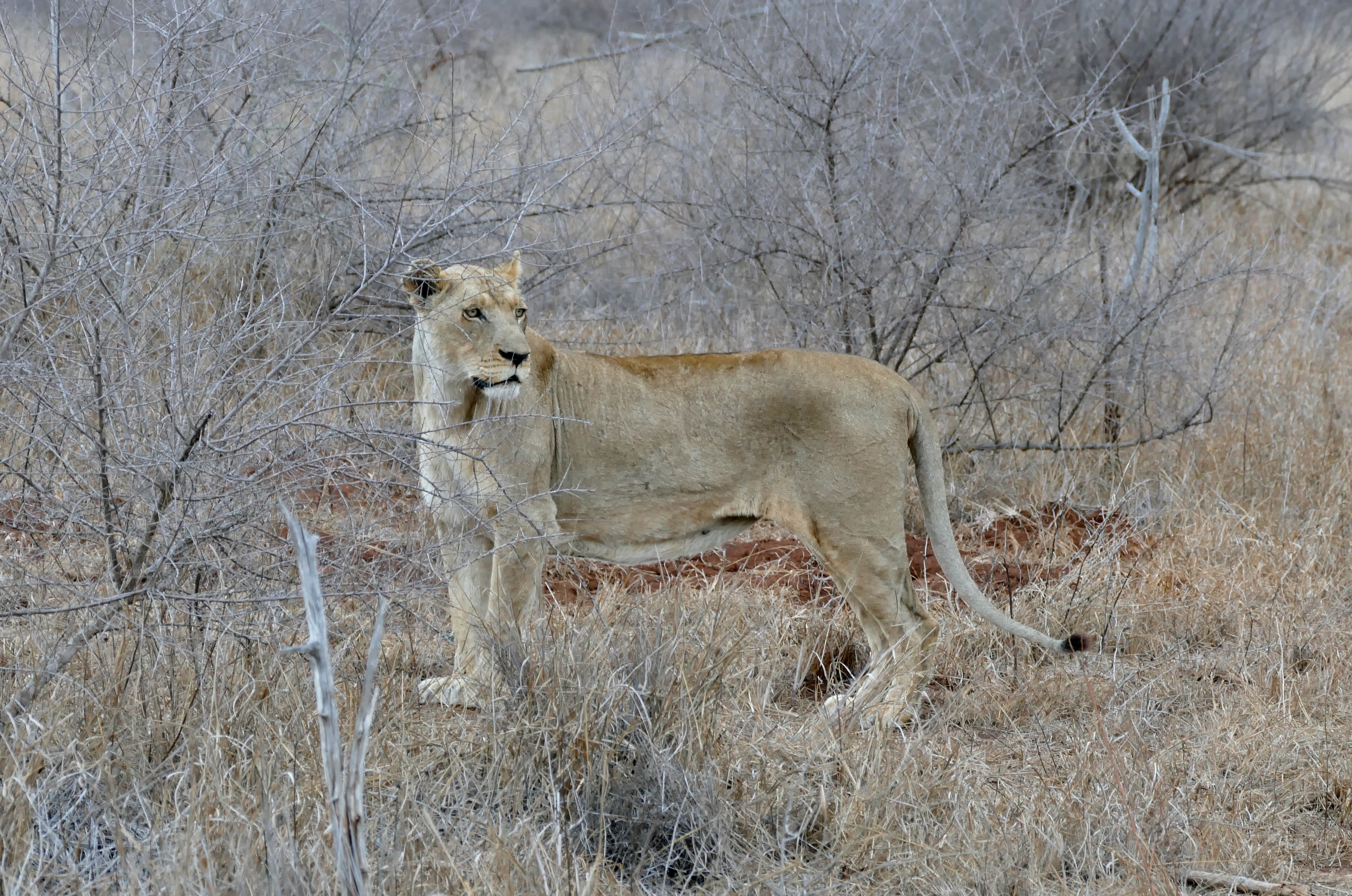
A lioness in the park

Hlane is home to populations of lion, elephant, South African giraffe, and white rhinoceros. Wildebeest, zebra and impala herds are attracted to the waterholes during the dry winter months, June to September. After a long absence, cheetah populations have been reintroduced in this park.

It has an abundant and diverse birdlife, including the highest density of nesting white-backed vultures in Africa. Raptors include martial eagles, bateleurs, and long-crested eagles, as well as several species of vultures including white-backed, white-headed, lappetfaced and the occasional Cape vulture. The park is home to the southernmost nesting site of the marabou stork. Some bird species, such as the southern yellow-billed hornbill (Tockus leucomelas), found here are either endangered or locally extinct in the country.

=== Accommodation ===
A network of game-viewing roads crisscrosses the park's flat terrain. Accommodation is available in thatched huts and cottages at two different sites. The main site is near the park entrance from MR3, Ndlovu Camp. The other site is Bhubesi Camp, almost at the northern end of the park. The road between them requires high clearance to navigate, so with a normal car, it is best to drive all the way around the park to get between them.

=== Transport ===
The park was bisected by the MR3 Highway in the 1960s, under pressure from sugar estates at the park's borders. They claimed that the highway would cause no environmental damage, but now hundreds of antelopes, warthog, buffaloes, and other game are struck by vehicles each year.

== See also ==
- Wildlife of Eswatini

== Sources ==
- Pinchuck, Tony (2002). South Africa. Rough Guides. ISBN 1-85828-853-3.
- Fitzpatrick, Mary (2004). South Africa, Lesotho & Swaziland. Lonely Planet. ISBN 1-74104-162-7.
