= Mbuluzi Game Reserve =

Mbuluzi Game Reserve is a privately owned reserve in Eswatini, within the Lubombo Conservancy. There are three lodges privately situated on the Mlawula River, and a campsite, situated above some rapids in the Mbuluzi River.

== Wildlife ==
Large wildlife species present in the reserve include South African giraffes, plains zebras, black wildebeests, kudus, nyalas, bushbucks, waterbucks, impala, warthogs, crocodiles, vervet monkeys, vhacma baboons, common duikers. Also occasionally seen are hippopotami, bushpigs, Cape clawless otters, and red duikers.
