= History of Eswatini =

History of the Kingdom of Eswatini from precolonial times to the present

Flag of Eswatini

Artifacts indicating human activity dating back to the early Stone Age have been found in the Kingdom of Eswatini. The earliest known inhabitants of the region were Khoisan hunter-gatherers. Later, the population became predominantly Nguni during and after the great Bantu migrations. People speaking languages ancestral to the current Sotho and Nguni languages began settling no later than the 11th century. The country now derives its name from a 19th century king named Mswati II. Mswati II was the greatest of the fighting kings of Eswatini, and he greatly extended the area of the country to twice its current size. The people of Eswatini largely belong to a number of clans that can be categorized as Emakhandzambili , Bemdzabuko and Emafikamuva, depending on when and how they settled in Eswatini.

== Origin and early settlements ==
The earliest known inhabitants of the region were Khoisan hunter-gatherers. They were largely replaced by the Bantu peoples during Bantu migrations. The Bantu hailed from the Great Lakes regions of eastern and central Africa. Evidence of agriculture and iron use dates from about the 4th century and people speaking languages ancestral to current Sotho and Nguni languages began settling no later than the 11th century in the modern Swazi country. Historically, the Bantu-speaking people of the southern part of Africa came from the Katanga direction and continued to expand to the south along the east coast of Africa. They settled in the area between the Drakensberg Mountains and the Indian Ocean, and like other Bantu-speaking communities, they brought with them cattle, seeds to cultivate, and handmade iron, wood, animal skin, and clay products.

The Swazi people trace their origins to the Embo-Dlamini, a branch of the Embo-Nguni that originally settled in Tembeland, near present-day Delagoa Bay (Maputo) in Mozambique during the Bantu expansion. Within the Tembe territories, the Embo people were a small chiefdom led by Chief Langa. According to oral history, Chief Langa had two sons, Dlamini I and Hlubi, who led their factions of the Embo in different directions. Dlamini's followers, later known as the Embo-Dlamini or the Embo-Nguni of Dlamini, moved northward and formed the early Ngwane communities (bakaNgwane), from which the Swazi polity later developed. Hlubi's followers, on the other hand, expanded southward along the Pongola River and became the ancestors of the amaHlubi, a major Nguni-speaking polity in what later became Natal. The Embo-Dlamini lived across the Lubombo Mountains, establishing a base in what is today called Lavumisa in Eswatini under the brothers, Dlamini and Hlubi, who lived together in the area. In the early 1600s, the Embo-Dlamini began conquering and incorporating weaker clans under the two brothers before they split.

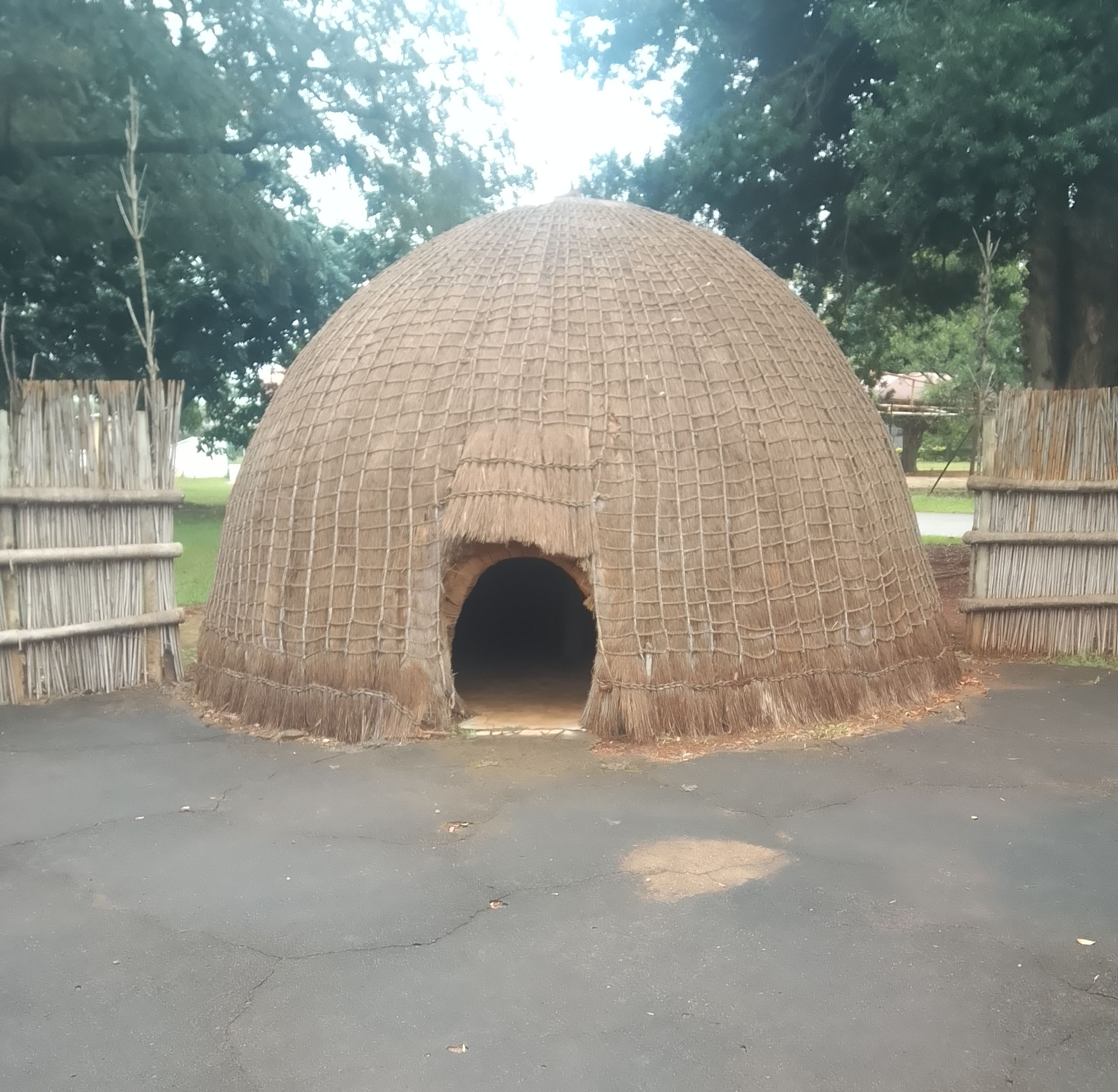
A Swazi traditional house displayed at the Eswatini National Museum, Lobamba

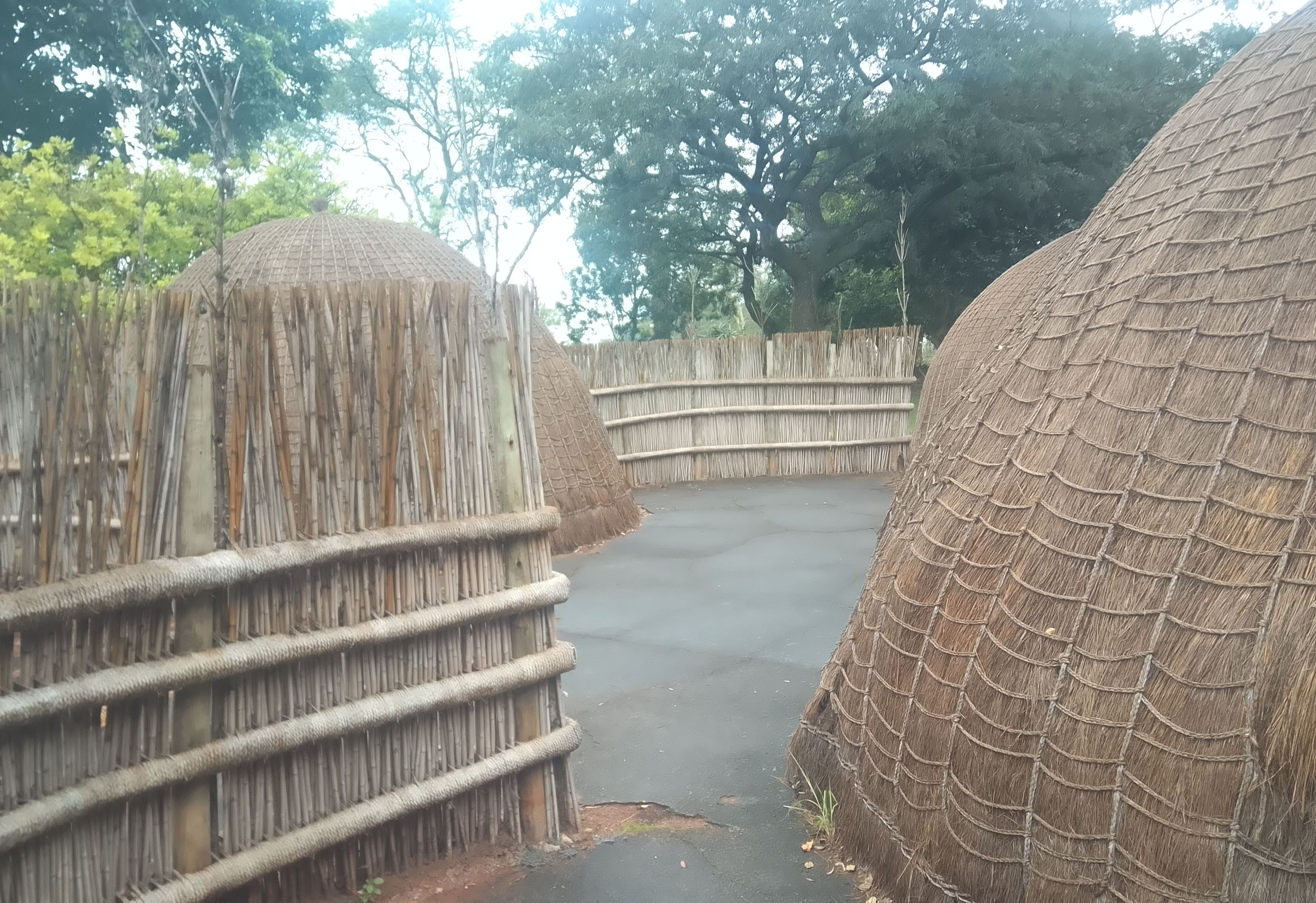

Most Nguni-speaking communities, including the Embo, were identified by their cattle-based economy, crop farming, and strategic settlement near water sources. Several scholars emphasise that the ethnic and political formation that is today called the Kingdom of Eswatini particularly emerged in the eastern Maputaland-Lubombo region. During their settlement in present-day Lavumisa, followers of the two brothers, Dlamini and Hlubi, were called EmaLangeni ("people of Chief Langa").

Other Embo communities, apart from the Tembe, that the earlier Swazi tribe were closely connected with in the area were the Nyaka people and Mngomezulu. Entirely, the region consisted of Embo-Nguni, Tsonga or Thonga people of Thonga-Nguni branch (ancestors of Tembe-Thonga) as well as the Dlamini or Embo-Dlamini or simply 'EmaLangeni'. Historian A. T. Bryant notes that some Swazi royal members, like King Mbandzeni, believed that the Swazi had historical links to, or emerged as an offshoot of, the Tembe-Thonga people.

Nineteenth-century British colonial records also linked the Tembe and Swazi chieftaincies. One document noted: "We observe that the words Kings are intended to signify the Kings of Swazi and Tembe."

Portuguese explorers in 1589 recorded meeting a group of people in the Limpopo River region who called themselves "Vhambedzi" or "BaMbo". Historian J.S.M. Matsebula states that this was an earlier form of the present day Swazi people, who were identified by their use of reeds in the Zambezi River. He writes, it "infers that the Swazi people arrived in southern Africa through the use of reeds to cross the Zambezi (Vhambedzi) River". This is also evidenced in their praise names: ..tsine lesavela eluhlangeni ("..we originated from the reeds") and nine beluhlanga ("you of the reeds") referring to the Dlamini clan. The Vhambedzi or Vhambo were the Embo during their gradual movement southward to the Maputaland-Lubombo region. This is also evidenced in the fact that some early Bemdzabuko clans are surnamed Mhlanga ("reeds").

In the Crocodile River region, the Nguni separated into Ntungwa-Nguni, Embo-Nguni and Embo-Dlamini (also called Tekela-Nguni), the earliest form of the current Swazi people. The Embo-Nguni continued with their movement southward until they reached Delagoa Bay (Maputo) between the Lubombo Mountains and Indian Ocean, becoming one of the small chiefdoms under the Nyaka east of the Maputo River and the Tembe west of the river.

Further Embo-Nguni splits were formed in the migration across the Pongola River, some settling between the Pongola River and Mfolozi River in present-day KwaZulu Natal and becoming the Ndwandwe, BakaNgwane ("people of Ngwane") and the Hlubi people. Other Embo-Nguni subgroups migrated to what is now Eastern Cape like the AmaMpondo in the Xhosa-speaking region.

Before the Swazi moved to the Pongola River to seek independence, they had for many years been settled on the Tembe River and submitted to Tembe chiefs, who were powerful and wealthy from coastal trade The Tembe commanded influence across the Lubombo Mountains and southwards to the Lusutfu River. The last small but influential group which followed in the early 18th century was led by Dlamini III, a son of Ludvonga I, who became king or iNgwenyama of the Swazi people approximately between 1720 until 1744. King Dlamini III moved from the coast to settle in the Ngwavuma area of the Lubombo Mountains, where his subjects included the Nyawo, Mngomezulu, and Matsenjwa. His praise names were Wena lowacedza Lubombo ngekuhlehletela wetfwele umfunti ("You who wandered about the Lubombo Mountains carrying a bundle of medicine"). He built his ceremonial homestead in the Ngwavuma and the administrative homestead was in Zibayaneni, east of Lubombo Mountains and to the Pongola River.. Dlamini III died in Zibayaneni in 1744 and was buried there.

Ngwane III succeeded his father King Dlamini III's death. Ngwane III, after whom the country was named KaNgwane ("country of Ngwane") and his people becoming known as BakaNgwane ("people of Ngwane "), is considered the first King of modern Swaziland. He crossed the Pongola River and built the royal home in the Magudu hills and moved again to live in Mzinsangu, near the Litshe laNgwane ("stone of Ngwane"), and built his ceremonial homestead, Zombodze. Ngwane III absorbed the Nkambule, Manana, Nkonyane, and other clans (Emafikamuva) as he consolidated his power. He also built Hhohho as an administrative centre, governed by Mndindane Shiba. Ngwane III's praise names were Imamba letalela emacandza lalishumi nakubili itidlele ("The Mamba that lays twelve eggs and eats them"), in reference to his killing of all his male children. The Swazis were in constant conflict with their neighbours, the Ndwandwes under King Zwide kaLanga, a very capable war leader. This pushed the Swazi further north, with Ngwane III establishing his capital at Shiselweni at the foot of the Mhlosheni hills. His only remaining son, Ndvungunye, was spared and ascended the throne in 1780 following his death. Ndvungunye was married to the two KoNtjingila sisters, Lojiba Simelane and Somnjalose Simelane, after the Simelane clan escaped the Ndwandwe wars to Swaziland following the death of their chief, Mabonya Simelane, in a battle with Ndwandwe forces after the mid 18th century. Somnjalo bore King Sobhuza I. Ndvungunye had his royal kraal at Shiselweni at the foothills of the eMhlosheni mountains. He died in 1815 after being struck by lightning, and his son Sobhuza I, nicknamed Somhlolo, ("Mysterious man"), became the king. Sobhuza married the daughter of Ndwandwe King Zwide, Tsandzile Ndwandwe, who gave birth to King Mswati II, as part of ending the wars between the two nations. Under Sobhuza I, the Ngwane people eventually established their capital at Zombodze in the heartland of present-day Swaziland. In this process, they conquered and incorporated the long established clans who had been in the region before the Swazi's arrival, known to the Swazi as Emakhandzambili.

The first person to document the history of Eswatini was John Gama, who noted in 1898 that most sources of his information about Swazi history were elders, like Macungela Nhlabatsi, who was already a grown up man during King Sobhuza I's reign. The second was Theophilus Shepstone, a British South African official who was in Eswatini from 1887 to 1899 as King Mbandzeni's adviser. The third was linguist James Stuart who lived in Eswatini from 1894 and 1899. The fourth was journalist Allister Miller, who founded the Times of Swaziland in 1897.

Stuart too systematically collected oral histories from Swazi elders, including detailed genealogies, king lists and accounts of historical events, in writing and creating what became known as the James Stuart Archive, which formed Shepstone's basic work.

From the late 20th century, early Swazi history was further documented by the emergency of writers like J.S.M. Matsebula of A History of Swaziland editions and later through systematic oral-history research following the formation of the Swaziland Oral History Project in 1985.

== Consolidation of the Swazi Nation (1740s–1868) ==
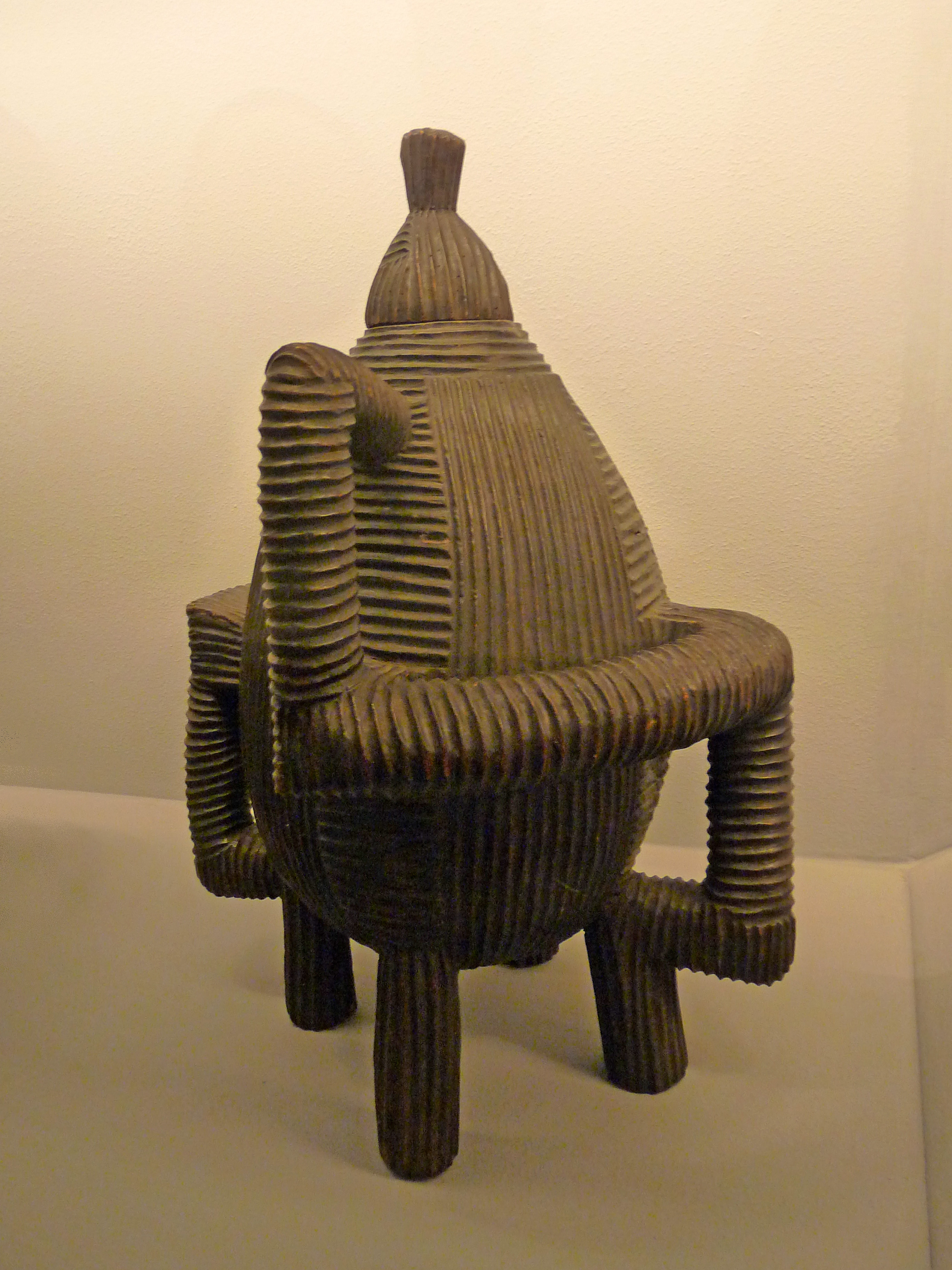
A 19th-century Swazi artifact

Swazis established a polity based on Kingship accompanied by Queen Mothers and during the minority of a crown prince a Queen Regent. Thus when Ngwane III died, LaYaka Ndwandwe, his mother, became the Queen Regent until Ngwane III's son Ndvungunye became the King in 1780, serving until 1815 when he was struck and killed by lightning. His administrative capital was in Shiselweni. He was succeeded by Sobhuza I after the regency of his Queen Regent Lomvula Mndzebele. Ngwane IV or Somhlolo, as Sobhuza I was also known as Sobhuza I, continued to expand the territory of Swaziland.

The conflict of Swaziland and the Ndwandwe kingdom led Somhlolo to move his capital from Zombodze in Shiselweni to the centre of Swaziland at another kraal called Zombodze. Somhlolo who became king in 1815 consolidated the order of the Ngwane state by incorporating the Emakhandzambili clans into his kingdom adding to the Bemdzabuko or true Swazi. Somhlolo was a strategic leader between 1815 and 1839 a period including the Mfecane period of Shaka Zulu a Zulu illegitimate child of Senzangakhona who created his kingdom from the Mtetwa polity established by Dingiswayo. Sobhuza used his diplomatic skills to avoid conflict with Shaka by allying with him when it suited him. As a result, Swaziland was left unaffected by the Mfecane wars. Somhlolo was succeeded in 1839 by his son Mswati II who is known as the greatest of the Swazi fighting kings.

Mswati inherited an area which extended as far as present-day Barberton in the north and included the Nomahasha district in the Portuguese territory of Mozambique. Mswati continued to expand Swazi territory and the clans added to the nation were considered Emafikamuva. During his reign, the territory of Swaziland was expanded northward and his capital was at Hhohho in the northern part of Swaziland. Mswati improved the military organisation of the regiments in Swaziland. His regiment was Inyatsi and he danced the sacred incwala at Hhohho instead of the common Ezulwini valley as his predecessors. Mswati was a powerful king who attacked other African tribes to acquire cattle and captives. Within Swaziland, his force was used to limit the power of the Emakhandzambili chiefs. Mswati made land grants in 1855 to the Lydenburg Republic though the wording of the sale is vague. The Boers at the time were fairly weak and could not act upon the land concession. Mswati continued to fight with other African tribes across the land and beyond in areas such as Zoutpansberg and Ohrigstad. His death in 1865 brought about an end to the conquest by the Swazi kings. Mswati was succeeded by Ludvonga, however, he died in his youth and as a result Mbandzeni was chosen by the Swazis National Council instead, and King Mbandzeni appointed Chief Manzini Mbokane as one of his leading tribal advisors. Chief Manzini Mbokane was a father of Ntengu Mbokane, and Chief Mbokane was the leader of the King's Advisory Council, which was later called Liqoqo.

== Settlements and concessionaires (1868–1899) ==
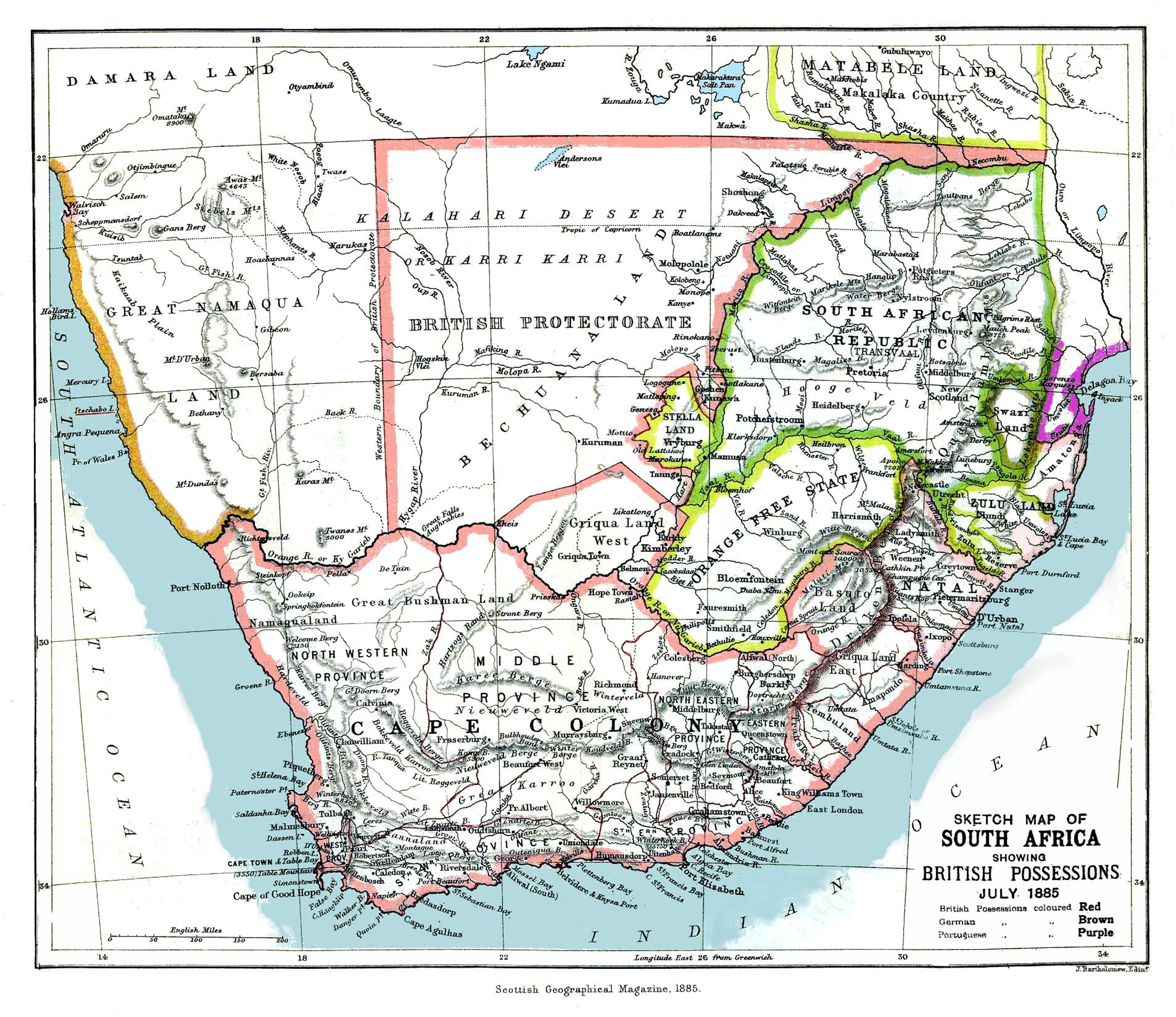
Southern Africa in 1885.

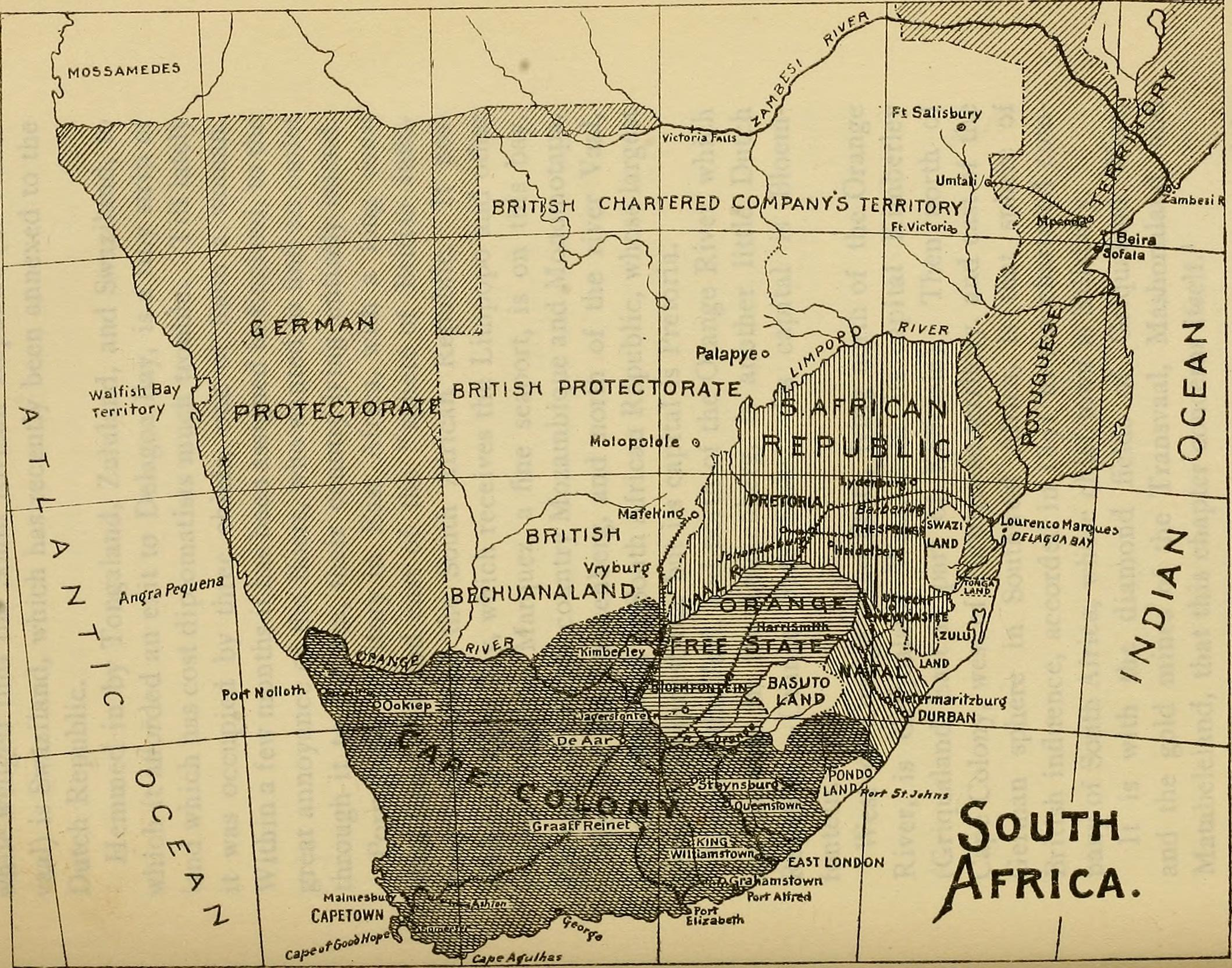
Southern Africa in 1895.

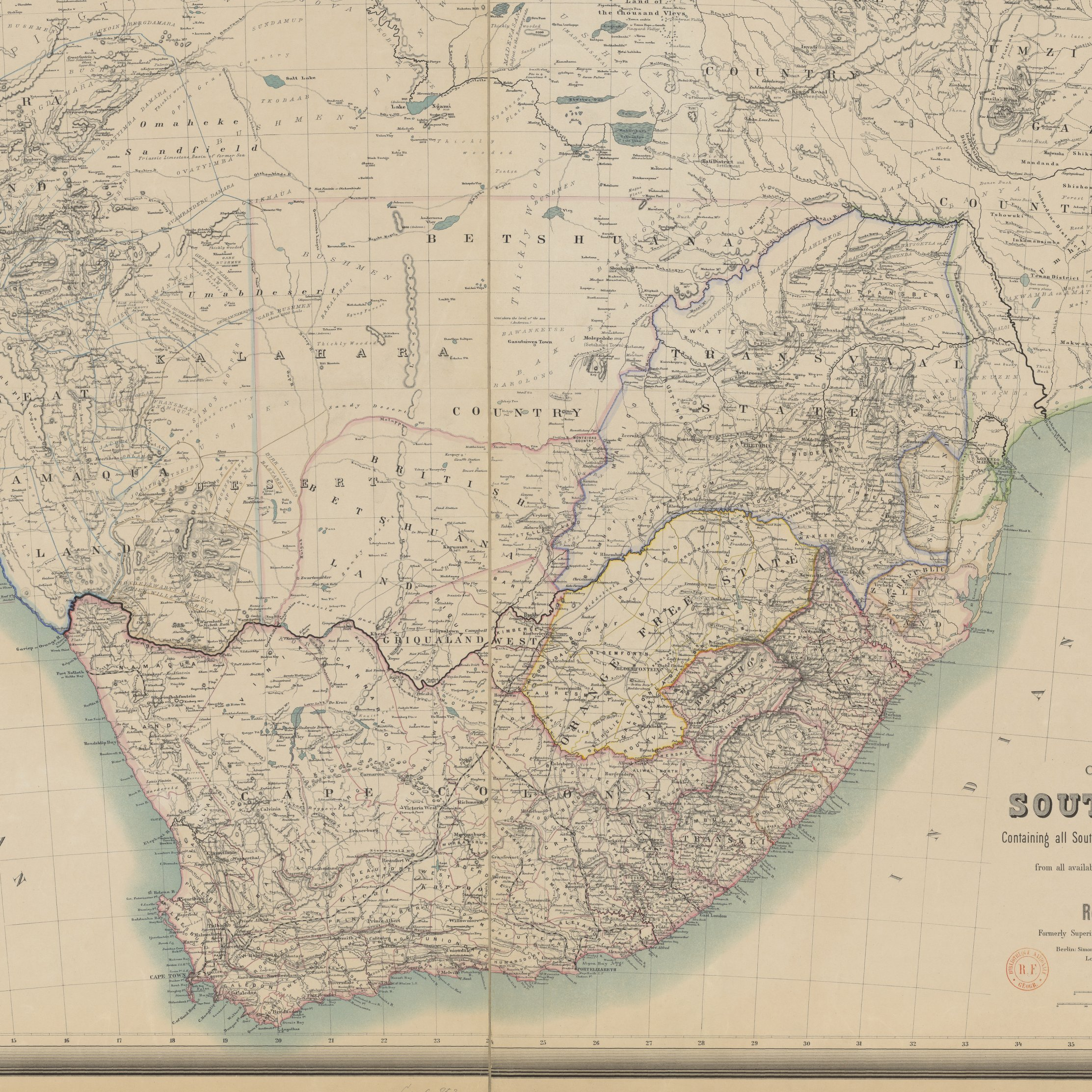
Southern Africa territories

The autonomy of the Emaswati was influenced by British and Dutch rule of Southern Africa in the 19th and early 20th centuries. In 1881 the British government signed a convention recognising Swazi independence. However, in 1894, a convention placed Swaziland under the South African Republic as a protectorate.

Swazi contact with European peoples began when Dutch Trekboers reached the western hinterland of Swaziland in the 1840s. By 1845 about 300 Boer families had settled in Ohristad with more families in Lydenburg. Two deeds of sale dated 1846 and 1855 indicate the sale of Swazi territory to the Dutch republics for a sum of 170 cattle. These deeds at face value seemed to surrender the whole of the Swazi territory to the Dutch. Following the death of King Mswati II in 1865, a period of regency followed with Queen Regent Tsandzile Ndwandwe until 1875. The South African Republic in 1868 attempted to annex Swaziland by a proclamation. Mbandzeni, following the death of his half brother, the crown prince Ludvonga in 1872, was chosen by inkhosikati LaMgadlela Khumalo as her adopted son and hence a crown prince. However threats existed from prince Mbilini who had married one of Ntengu Mbokane's daughters and Mbandzeni's half brother and one of the sons of Mswati who was a pretender to the throne and allied with the Zulu King Cetshwayo. However, he never became successful. The British prevented any attacks from Cetshwayo, who had been crowned by Sir Theophilus Shepstone in 1873. In addition, the Transvaal Boers wanted to assert their authority over Swaziland by supporting Mbandzeni. Indeed, in Mbandzeni's coronation Rudolf, the Resident Magistrate of Ladysmith and former landdrost of Utrecht in the company of about 350 burghers and 70 wagons, attended the ceremony. During this period, Britain annexed the Transvaal (1877 to 1881). In 1879, the same year as the Zulu war, Mbandzeni aided the British who were now controlling the Transvaal to defeat Sekhukhune and to dismantle his kingdom. In return for his assistance, Swaziland's independence was to be guaranteed perpetually and Swaziland would be protected from Boer and Zulu encroachment.

In 1881 the Pretoria Convention established nominal British suzerainty over the re-established Transvaal State; article 24 guaranteed the independence of Swaziland, its boundary and Swazi people in their country as recognised by both Britain and the Transvaal. Under this convention, the Swazi territory was reduced in size, leaving Swazi people as residents of the Transvaal territory in present-day Mpumalanga province in South Africa. The London Convention of 1884's article XII continued to recognise Swaziland as an independent country with Mbandzeni as its King. However, in the years between 1885 and 1889, as more concessions were granted, the population of Europeans in Swaziland increased. Unease with some concessionaires led to Mbandzeni to request British intervention. In addition to this, Boer encroachments, especially in 1887, increased the intensity of these requests. The situation in the country continued to deteriorate as some raids, cattle rustling and stealing of children from Swazi villages by Boers continued. Britain refused intervention on the grounds that there was presence of European residents not of British extraction and concessions held at the time by the South African Republic in areas such as tax collection, postal services which should be in the control of a State government.

On 18 December 1889 after Mbandzeni's death, the Swazi Government, represented by the Queen Regent Tibati Nkambule and the Swazi Council made a proclamation appointing Sir Theophilus Shepstone, Chief Ntengu Mbokane and two other officers representing the South African Republic and Britain and a provisional council to oversee administration of the country especially concession and affairs of European residents of the country. A concessions court was established to see which concessions were valid and which were dubious. The organic proclamation was followed by the London convention of 1894 which settled the matter over Swaziland. The Swazi proclamation supporting this convention was resisted for a while since its proposal in 1893 and was signed by the Queen Regent and Swazi Council in December 1894. In this convention, the status of Swaziland, its people and the Kings were recognised as in the 1884 convention. However, for the administrative affairs of Swaziland it would be a protected state of the Transvaal republic with guarantees on the rights of Swazi people in their country and their system of governance. This administration, led by Krogh, went on until the Anglo Boer War started in 1899. Ngwane V who had been chosen as crown prince following Mbandzeni's death in 1889 was crowned in 1895 after the London Convention. In 1898 he was allegedly responsible for the death of his advisors Mbaba Nsibandze, Chief Mbokane and two of his aides. In response, he was charged with the crime and during this time he fled to British Zululand, returning on guaranteed for his safety. On his return he was charged with a lesser crime of public disturbance and was fined 500 pounds. In addition, his judicial powers were reduced. The following year, in October 1899, the Anglo Boer War began. This led to the discontinuity of Transvaal administration of Swaziland's affairs. Ingwenyama Ngwane V, however, ruled until December of that year, when he died while dancing the sacred incwala.

== Anglo-Boer War (1899–1902) ==
Swaziland was indirectly involved in the Second Boer War (1899–1902). The beginning of the conflict found it administered by the South African Republic, with the colonial headquarters set at Bremersdorp. In September 1899, with war considered imminent, the colonists started evacuating the area. Ngwane V of Swaziland (Bhunu) was informed that the area would be left in his care during the absence of the White residents. The Swaziland Police under Sgt Opperman started practicing for war while issuing rifles and ammunition to remaining burghers. On 4 October 1899, Special Commissioner Krogh issued an official notice of evacuation for "all White inhabitants" with the exception of burghers eligible for active service. Most of the British subjects were escorted towards the border with Mozambique, women and other South African civilians were left heading for various destinations. People with dual nationality were still subject to the draft, though unwilling to fight against their own people. Several of them escaped towards Mozambique or the Colony of Natal.

It was not long before skirmishes involved the Swaziland forces. On 28 October 1899, the newly formed Swaziland Commando unit moved against a British police post at Kwaliweni. The South African unit counted about 200 burghers, while the outpost only had 20 men. Bhunu managed to warn the police post of the approaching attack. The police retreated towards Ingwavuma, the seat of a magistrate. The Commandos burned the abandoned post and a nearby shop to the ground. Then Joaquim Ferreira led them towards Ingwavuma. The village was not better guarded and had to also be evacuated. The Swaziland Commando burned it to the ground, while the magistrate and his people escaped to Nongoma.

Meanwhile, the Swazi people had been warned by Piet Joubert to remain calm and not involve themselves in the conflict. Bhunu instead found himself unrestricted from colonial authorities for the first time. He soon felt free to settle old scores with political enemies. News of the violent deaths of diplomat Mnkonkoni Kunene and several others in time reached the Boer forces involved in the Siege of Ladysmith. Several of the dead had close ties to the colonial authorities. Joubert had to assure worried commanders that Swaziland was not turning against them. Indeed, spies reported that Bhunu feared he had been bewitched. He was striking against whomever he suspected of the deed. On 10 December 1899, Bhunu died due to a serious illness. He had blamed it on sorcery, though contemporaries suspect it was alcohol-induced. His mother Labotsibeni Mdluli became regent. She set about eliminating the surviving advisors and favourites of Bhunu.

Swazi regiments were roaming the country during the internal conflicts. The South African authorities were worried that the violence could expand towards the south-western border of Swaziland, where Boer farms were cultivated by women and children. They had the farms evacuated and the population transferred to Piet Retief. The farmers from Piet Retief, Wakkerstroom and their vicinities had made a practice of trekking their sheep into Swaziland for winter grazing. In January 1900, Francis William Reitz, the State Secretary of the South African Republic, started issuing orders discouraging any sheep-herders from entering Swaziland. On 18 April 1900, any such entry was forbidden. The Swaziland Commando were by that point far from their initial home base, fighting along the Tugela River.

The British had their own concerns about Swaziland. They suspected that supplies from Mozambique could be smuggled to the Boers through Swaziland. Queen-regent Labotsibeni was however attempting to maintain neutrality in the wider conflict, pre-occupied with securing the throne. Her grandson Sobhuza II of Swaziland was underage and there were other viable candidates for the throne among the House of Dlamini, in particular Prince Masumphe. Masumphe was a cousin of Bhunu and had been a rival candidate for the throne since 1889. His line of the family maintained close relations with the Boers, the Prince himself having been educated at Pretoria. By May, 1900, the Queen was worried that the Boers would intervene against her in case of a succession dispute. She opened communications with the restored magistrate of Ingwavuma, arranging to flee to his area if needed.

Her messages were passed to the government of Natal and from there to Cape Town, the capital of the Cape Colony. A reply by Johannes Smuts assured her that the British had not forgotten about the Swazi and British representatives would reliably return to Swaziland at an early date. The message might have reflected Smuts' own ambitions but his authority on such matters was rather questionable. But Frederick Roberts, Baron Roberts, a high-ranking military officer, was also convinced to start diplomatic contacts with the Queen. His representatives were to persuade the queen-regent of three things: first, the need to prevent the Boers from occupying the mountains of the area; secondly, the necessity of formally appealing for British protection; and third, to make clear that the indiscriminate murders in Swaziland would have to end.

The British contacts with the Swazi played a role in advance of their siege of Komatipoort, a nearby South African stronghold. In September 1900, once the town fell, the British were able to capture Barberton and its area. A number of Boers fled into Swaziland, only to have the Swazi disarm them and confiscate their cattle. The end of South African presence in the area left open the question of what to do with Swaziland. Smuts had been campaigning since May to convince the British authorities to place Swaziland under their administration. By September, Smuts had gained some support from civil authorities but not from military ones, since Roberts did not want to devote any of his forces to an invasion or occupation of the area. Nevertheless, Smuts attempted some diplomatic contacts with the Swazi, which were not particularly successful. The individual Smuts met for discussions refused to give any information on the internal affairs of Swaziland or Boer activities.

The fall of Komatipoort directly resulted in increased importance of Swaziland for the Boers. To maintain their communications with diplomatic and trade contacts in Lourenço Marques, Mozambique, the Boers had to send messengers through Swaziland. This was difficult since British forces were allowed to pass through certain Swazi areas. By November 1900, the Queen was able to assure both Roberts and Smuts that she "was doing her best to drive Boers out of her country." A few armed burghers and their African allies, hostile to her government, were still active at times.

On 29 November 1900, Roberts was relieved of his command. His replacement was Herbert Kitchener, Baron Kitchener of Khartoum. By late December, Smuts contacted the military secretary office of Kitchener concerning the Swaziland situation. Smuts had secured the position of Resident Commissioner of Swaziland, though the British had no actual authority over the area. He attempted to convince Kitchener it was time to establish a permanent military presence in Swaziland and put Smuts in charge of the area. Kitchener had a different view. Starting his own correspondence with Labotsibeni, Kitchener insisted on three points: first, the Swazi were still required to not take part in the war; second, no British forces would be sent into Swaziland unless the area faced a Boer invasion; and third, the Swazis were now directly under the authority of the British Crown, owing their loyalty to Victoria of the United Kingdom.

In December 1900 – January 1901, there were reports that retreating Boers were attempting to flee through Swaziland. Eight British columns were sent to either force the Boer commandos to surrender or flee to Swaziland. A certain column under Horace Smith-Dorrien proceeded all the way to the Swaziland border, managing to capture several Boer wagons and large numbers of cattle and sheep on 9 February 1901. Most of the captured Boers were sent to the concentration camp of Volksrust. On 11 February, another column under Edmund Allenby was positioned at the southern border of Swaziland. On 14 February, Smith-Dorrien's forces reached Amsterdam. There he was contacted by envoys of the Queen-regent, requesting aid in driving the Boers off her land. In response, the Imperial Light Horse and the Suffolk Regiment were sent into Swaziland.

Joined by armed Swazis, the two regiments were able to capture about 30 Boers in an initial skirmish. However heavy rains soon slowed their advance through the country. On 28 February 1901, 200 other men of the British mounted infantry entered Swaziland. Under Lt. Col. Henry, this force managed to locate and capture the transport convoy of the Piet Retief Commandos. About 65 Boers were captured in the operation. The remnants of the Commandos retreated towards the southern border of Swaziland, only to be captured by the British forces stationed there. By early March, Smith-Dorrien noted that the Swazis were pillaging Boer residences. By this time, Allenby had reached Mahamba and set up camp there, Henry was pursuing another Boer wagon convoy and Queen-regent Labotsibeni was ordering her Impis to clear their land from the Boers. Henry eventually managed to return to Derby with several prisoners, while Allenby and his forces reached the vicinity of Hlatikulu. The burghers had to limit themselves to "the hills of southwestern Swaziland".

Surviving accounts from the Devonshire Regiment indicate that the Swazis were acting as "a ninth column, commanded by the Queen of the Swazis." On 8 March 1901, remnants of the Piet Retief Commandos, accompanied by women and children, were attacked by forces supposedly under Chief Ntshingila Simelano. The latter consisted of about 40 men, including two riflemen. Thirteen Burghers and one African guide were killed, several wounded, and the others were scattered. Some of the survivors later surrendered to the 18th Hussars. Ntshingila later denied any involvement in the massacre. In any case, the incident terrified several other Boers. Between 8 and 11 March, about 70 burghers and various women and children chose to surrender to Allenby rather than face the Swazis. The British nevertheless warned Labotsibeni to cease further massacres.

On 11 April 1901, Louis Botha corresponded with Kitchener, complaining that British officers were inducing the Swazis to fight against the Boers. Claiming the result was the indiscriminate murders of Burghers, women and children by Swazi commandos. Allenby attributed the killings partly to Swazi anxiety to counter Boer incursions into their territory and partly to their fear of Boer reprisals. That is what the Boers would do when the British eventually left. Allenby himself refused to allow large numbers of armed Swazis to join his column, though he still used a few of them as guides. Smuts finally entered Swaziland during this month, though unable to establish his authority over any British forces.

The presence of regular British troops allowed the queen-regent to present to them her concerns over an irregular unit, "Steinaecker's Horse." Created early in the war as a unit of adventurers and mercenaries under British command, they were well known for looting Boer property. With the Boer increasingly impoverished, however, they had turned their attention to the cattle of the Swazi. Labotsibeni complained to both sides that this unit consisted of common robbers occupying Bremersdorp. Botha responded by sending a Commando unit against the Horse, with orders to avoid antagonizing the Swazi in any way. The Swazi National Council agreed to let them pass. Between 21 and 23 July 1901, the Ermelo Commandos succeeded in forcing most of the "Steinaecker's Horse" forces to retreat, capturing about 35 men, killing or wounding a few and burning Bremersdorp to the ground.

Both the British and the Boers continued to have access to Swaziland with occasional skirmishes occurring. On 8 November 1901, for example, the 13th Hussars captured 14 burghers near Mahamba. The skirmishes ended in February 1902 with the defeat of the final Boer unit in Swaziland.

In 1903, following the British victory in the Anglo-Boer war, Swaziland became a British protectorate. Much of its early administration (for example, postal services) was carried out from South Africa until 1906 when the Transvaal colony was granted self-government. Eswatini regained independence on 6 September 1968 and became the Kingdom of Swaziland. Sobhuza II, the king at independence, had become Ingwenyama in 1899 after the death of his father Ngwane V. His official coronation had taken place in December 1921 following the regency of Labotsibeni, after which he had led an unsuccessful deputation to the Privy council in London in 1922 regarding the issue of land.

== Swaziland Protectorate (1903–1968) ==
Throughout the protectorate period from 1903 to 1968, Swaziland was largely governed by a resident commissioner who ruled according to decrees issued by the British High Commissioner to South Africa. Such decrees were formulated in close consultation with the resident commissioners, who in turn took informal and formal advice from White settler interests and the Swazi king. In 1907, during the residency of Robert Coryndon, Swazi land was partitioned into a third for the Swazi nation, or reserves, and the remaining two-thirds as crown and commercial land, for European occupation. The partition was carried out in 1909, and Swazis living in European areas were given five years to vacate the land.

=== British Resident Commissioners in Swaziland ===
Date	Name	Birth/Death
1903–1907	Francis Enraght-Moony	b. 1865 – d. 1943
1907–1916	Robert Thorne Coryndon	b. 1870 – d. 1925
Jan 1917 – Oct 1928	Sir De Symons Montagu George Honey	b. 1872 – d. 1945
Oct 1928 – 1 Apr 1935	Thomas Ainsworth Dickson	b. 1881 – d. 1935
Oct 1935 – Nov 1937	Allan Graham Marwick	b. 1877 – d. 1966
Nov 1937 – 30 Sep 1942	Charles Lamb Bruton	b. 1890 – d. 1969
30 Sep 1942 – 25 Aug 1946	Eric Kellett Featherstone	b. 1896 – d. 1965
25 Aug 1946 – 1951	Edward Betham Beetham	b. 1905 – d. 1979
1951–1956	David Loftus Morgan	b. 1904 – d. 1976
1956–1964	Brian Allan Marwick	b. 1908 – d. 1992
1964–1968	Francis Alfred Lloyd	b. 1916 – d. 2006

In 1921, the British established Swaziland's first legislative body — a European Advisory Council (EAC) of elected White representatives with the task of advising the British Resident Commissioner on non-Swazi affairs. In 1944, the Commissioner reconstituted the basis and role of the EAC, and, over Swazi objections, issued a Native Authorities Proclamation constituting the paramount chief or Ingwenyama and King to the Swazis, as the British called the king, as the native authority for the territory to issue legally enforceable orders to the Swazis, subject to restrictions and directions from the resident commissioner. Under pressure from royal non-cooperation, this proclamation was revised in 1952 to grant the Swazi paramount chief a degree of autonomy unprecedented in British indirect rule in Africa. Also in 1921, after more than twenty years of the regency headed by Queen Regent Labotsibeni, Sobhuza II became Ingwenyama (lion) or head of the Swazi nation.

In the early years of indirect rule, the British expected that Swaziland would eventually be incorporated into South Africa. After the Second World War, however, South Africa's intensification of racial discrimination, especially through the election of the National Party, induced the United Kingdom to prepare Swaziland for complete independence. Political activity intensified in the early 1960s. Several political parties were formed and jostled for power and economic development. However, the parties were largely urban and had few ties to the rural areas, where most Swazis still lived. The traditional Swazi leaders, including King Sobhuza II and his Inner Council, formed the Imbokodvo National Movement (INM), a political group that capitalized on its close identification with the Swazi way of life. Responding to pressure for political change, the protectorate government scheduled an election in mid-1964 for the first Legislative Council in which the Swazis would participate. In the election, the INM and four other parties, most having more radical platforms, competed in the election. The INM won all 24 elective seats.

Swazi soldiers served in World War II (see Eswatini in World War II).

== Independence (1968–1980s) ==
Leading up to independence, the INM had solidified its political base. Having done this, the INM incorporated many demands of the more radical parties, especially that of immediate independence. In 1966, the UK Government agreed to discuss a new constitution. A constitutional committee agreed on a constitutional monarchy for Swaziland, with self-government to follow parliamentary elections in 1967. Swaziland became independent on 6 September 1968. Swaziland's first post-independence elections were held in May 1972. The INM received close to 75% of the vote. The Ngwane National Liberatory Congress (NNLC) received slightly more than 20% of the vote which gained the party three seats in parliament.

In response to the NNLC's showing, King Sobhuza repealed the 1968 constitution on 12 April 1973 and dissolved parliament. He assumed all powers of government and prohibited all political activities and trade unions from operating. He justified his actions as having removed alien and divisive political practices incompatible with the Swazi way of life. In January 1979, a new parliament was convened, chosen partly through indirect elections and partly through direct appointment by the king.

King Sobhuza II died in August 1982, and Queen Regent Dzeliwe assumed the duties of the head of state. In 1984, an internal dispute led to the replacement of the prime minister and eventual replacement of Dzeliwe by a new Queen Regent Ntombi. Ntombi's only child, Prince Makhosetive, was named heir to the Swazi throne. Real power at this time was concentrated in the Liqoqo, a supreme traditional advisory body that claimed to give binding advice to the Queen Regent. In October 1985, Queen Regent Ntombi demonstrated her power by dismissing the leading figures of the Liqoqo. Prince Makhosetive returned from school in England to ascend to the throne and help end the continuing internal disputes. He was enthroned as Ingwenyama Mswati III on 25 April 1986. Shortly afterwards he abolished the Liqoqo. In November 1987, a new parliament was elected and a new cabinet appointed.

== Recent history (1980s-) ==
Mswati III is the present monarch of Swaziland since his coronation in 1986, and rules together with Queen Mother Ntombi Tfwala. In 1986 Sotsha Dlamini was appointed prime minister, taking over from Prince Bhekimpi. In 1987, following a premature dissolution of parliament by the king, Swaziland held its third parliamentary election under the tinkhundla traditional system. In 1988 and 1989, an underground political party, the People's United Democratic Movement (PUDEMO), criticized the king and his government, calling for 'democratic reforms'. In response to this political threat and to growing popular calls for greater accountability within government, the king and the prime minister initiated an ongoing national debate on the constitutional and political future of Swaziland. This debate produced a handful of political reforms, approved by the king, including direct and indirect voting, in the 1993 national elections. In this election, voters were registered, the constituencies were increased from 50 to 55 and the election was judged as free and fair.

The economy and the population of Swaziland continued to grow in the 1980s. The average economic growth was 3.3% annual growth between 1985 and 1993. Annual population growth was at approximately 3% during the same period. Swaziland's 1980s economy continued to be dependent on South Africa, with 90% of imports coming from South Africa and 37% of exports going to South Africa. Swaziland, along with Lesotho, Botswana and South Africa continued to be members of the Southern African Customs Union (SACU). State revenues were heavily dependent on the Customs Union's remittances which were between 48.3% and 67.1% between 1981 and 1987.

The 1990s saw a rise in student and labor protests pressuring the king to introduce reforms. Thus, progress toward constitutional reforms began, culminating with the introduction of the current Swaziland constitution in 2005. This happened despite objections by political activists. The current constitution does not clearly deal with the status of political parties. The first election under the new constitution took place in 2008. Members of parliament were elected from 55 constituencies (also known as tinkhundla). These MPs served five-year terms which ended in 2013. In 2011, Swaziland suffered an economic crisis, due to reduced SACU receipts. This led to the government of Swaziland to request a loan from neighbouring South Africa. However, the Swazi government did not agree with the conditions of the loan, which included political reforms. During this period, there was increased pressure on the Swaziland government to carry out more reforms. Public protests by civic organizations and trade unions became more common. Improvements in SACU receipts from 2012 onwards, eased the fiscal pressure on the Swazi government. The new parliament, the second since promulgation of the constitution, was elected on 20 September 2013. This saw the reappointment of Sibusiso Dlamini, by the king, as prime minister for the third time.

In 1989, Sotja Dlamini was dismissed from his position as prime minister on 12 July 1989 and was replaced with a former Swaziland Federation of Trade Unions (SFTU) secretary-general, Obed Dlamini. He was to be the premier until 1993 and succeeded by Prince Mbilini. During the tenure of both Obed and Mbilini there was growing labor militancy which culminated in a major general strike in 1997 led by the SFTU. Following the labor action, Prince Mbilini was replaced as prime minister by Sibusiso Dlamini.

The constitution for independent Swaziland was promulgated by Britain in November 1963 under the terms of which legislative and executive councils were established. This development was opposed by the Swazi National Council (Liqoqo). Despite such opposition, elections took place and the first Legislative Council of Swaziland was constituted on 9 September 1964. Changes to the original constitution proposed by the Legislative Council were accepted by Britain and a new constitution providing for a House of Assembly and Senate was drawn up. Elections under this constitution were held in 1967. Following the elections of 1973, the constitution of Swaziland was suspended by King Sobhuza II who thereafter ruled the country by decree until his death in 1982. At this point Sobhuza II had ruled Eswatini for 83 years, making him the longest ruling monarch in history. A regency followed his death, with Queen Regent Dzeliwe Shongwe being head of state until 1984 when she was removed by Liqoqo and replaced by Queen Mother Ntombi Twala. Mswati III, the son of Ntombi, was crowned king on 25 April 1986 as King and Ingwenyama of Eswatini. In 2018, during the 50th independence day celebration, the king announced the official renaming of the country from the Anglicized Swaziland to its Siswati form Eswatini. Following this, many governmental and non-governmental bodies, corporations and international organizations changed all mention of Swaziland to Eswatini.

On 19 April 2018, King Mswati III announced that the Kingdom of Swaziland had renamed itself the Kingdom of Eswatini to mark the 50th anniversary of Swazi independence. The new name, Eswatini, means "land of the Swazis" in the Swazi language, and was partially intended to prevent confusion with the similarly named Switzerland.
