= Mswati I =

Late 16th-century Swazi leader

- Early leader of the Swazi
- Reign: c.16th century
- Predecessor: Dlamini I
- Successor: Ngwane II
- Born: Limphophoma, (Limpopo River)
- Issue: Ngwane II
- Dynasty: House of Dlamini
- Father: Dlamini I
- Religion: African traditional religion

Mswati I was a 16th-century Embo-Dlamini prince and early leader of the House of Dlamini. He was a son of Dlamini I, an Embo-Nguni chief within the Maputaland-Lubombo region.

== Early life ==
According to Swazi oral traditions recorded by historians such as J.S.M. Matsebula and A. T. Bryant, Mswati I was the son of Dlamini I and they lived within the sphere of the Tembe polity near Delagoa Bay. Mswati I had at least one brother, Prince Mathonga, who remained within the early Swazi leadership structure under Mswati I.

Mswati I is traditionally described as a warlike figure and a highly mobile leader who frequently relocated his settlements and conducted raids against weaker neighbouring clans in pursuit of cattle and territory. These movements contributed to the gradual consolidation of the Swazi authority north of the Lubombo Mountains. Historian J.S.M. Matsebula records that cattle captured during Mswati I's campaigns were often entrusted to his brother Mathonga.
