= 2026 in Eswatini =

- Decades: 2000s; 2010s; 2020s
- See also: Other events of 2026; Timeline of Eswatini history

Events in the year 2026 in Eswatini

== Incumbents ==
- Monarch (Ngwenyama): Mswati III
- Prime Minister: Russell Dlamini

== Events ==
- 12 March – The government receives four additional third-country deportees from the United States, after an additional payment of $5.1 million to the country.
- 17 March – The National AIDS Programme begins administering the HIV prevention drug lenacapavir.
- 2 May – Taiwanese Lai Ching-te arrives in Eswatini as part of a long-delayed visit marred by multiple African states refusing entry to their airspace for transit purposes.

== Holidays ==
- 1 January – New Year's Day
- 3 April – Good Friday
- 6 April – Easter Monday
- 19 April – King's Birthday
- 25 April – National Flag Day
- 1 May – Labour Day
- 14 May – Ascension Day
- 22 July – King Father's Birthday
- 31 August– Umhlanga
- 6 September – Somhlolo Day
- 25 December – Christmas Day
- 26 December – Boxing Day
- 27 December – Incwala

== Deaths ==
- 16 September – Princess Lindiwe, royal and politician, MP (since 2018)

== See also ==
- 2026 in Southern Africa
