= Dlamini III =

King of Eswatini from 1720 to 1744

- Predecessor: Ludvonga I
- Successor: Ngwane III
- Died: 1744
- Burial: Zibayaneni, east of Lubombo Mountains
- Spouse: LaYaka Ndwandwe
- Issue: Ngwane III
- House: House of Dlamini

Dlamini III (also known as Ladzandzukane and Sidvwaba Silutfuli) was a king or Ngwenyama of the Swazi people who led them approximately between 1720 until 1744. He was the father to Ngwane III the first King of modern Swaziland. He is considered to be the connecting link between the Delagoa Bay Swazi settlements and the modern Swazi kingdom. His senior advisor was Chief Gadlela Mbokane. Dlamini settled his followers near the Pongola River where it cuts through the Lubombo Mountains. The early Swazi journeyed along with the Ndwandwe who are a closely related lineage.

Dlamini was succeeded by Ngwane III his son with Queen LaYaka Ndwandwe. Dlamini's son Ngwane III, took over the chieftaincy and established Swazi settlements south of the Pongola River and when forced to abandon them, he moved his followers to cross back and settle on its northern banks. This marked the founding of modern Swaziland, and the first capital at Zombodze was established not very long after his ascent. Ngwane's brothers Ndlela and his uncles Shabalala and Mabuza were settled nearby.

== Evolution of the Swazi State ==
The Swazi state, historically the BakaNgwane polity, emerged from a consolidation of various Nguni-speaking groups in the eastern Maputaland-Lubombo region, which included the Embo-Nguni, Embo-Dlamini, Tsonga-Nguni and Emalangeni, who were closely connected with the coastal Tembe and Nyaka communities along Delagoa Bay.

Inland migrations of these groups contributed to the founding lines of the Ngwane people and the Dlamini dynasty under King Dlamini III.

== Family and succession ==
Dlamini III was the son of King Ludvonga I and Queen Lomakhetfwa. His brother Prince Hlubi Dlamini was initially recognized as heir of the Swazi people but never became king. Together, Hlubi and Dlamini III initially lived on the Lebombo Mountains before Hlubi later migrated southwards and westwards in response to regional conflicts. Dlamini III eventually ascended to the throne and ruled in the Lebombo. His son, King Ngwane III, was born in the Lebombo at an area called Nkanini and established the first settlements of the modern Swazi Kingdom south of the Pongola River.

Regnal titles
Preceded by Ludvonga I (King)	King of Swaziland; 1720–1744	Succeeded by Ngwane III (King)
