= Hlubi Dlamini =

18th century Swazi prince

- Regarded heir apparent of the Kingdom of Eswatini in oral traditions
- Reign: Never reigned; his brother Dlamini III was installed instead
- Predecessor: King Ludvonga I (father)
- Successor: King Dlamini III (brother)
- Died: between Lavumisa and Standerton
- Dynasty: Dlamini
- Father: King Ludvonga I
- Mother: Queen Lomakhetfwa
- Religion: African traditional religion

Hlubi Dlamini was an 18th-century Swazi prince and son of King Ludvonga I and his wife Lomakhetfwa. According to oral traditions collected in the Swaziland Oral History Project, Hlubi was recognized as heir to Ludvonga I but never became king due to palace politics.

He was one of the four sons of Ludvonga I, along with Prince Loziyingile Dlamini, Prince Mamba Dlamini and King Dlamini III. Some oral traditions suggest ritual considerations, including Hlubi being left-handed - an attribute regarded as ritually inappropriate for kingship in Swazi custom, may have contributed to his exclusion.

Although Hlubi did not ascend the throne, his legacy survives in praise names (tibongo) among the Dlamini branch.

== Migrations ==
Oral histories state that Hlubi and his brother Prince Dlamini (later King Dlamini III) initially lived in the Lubombo Mountains on the frontier between Eswatini and the Tembe territory.

The Tembe were influential chiefs controlling ivory trade with Portuguese, British and Dutch merchants. Conflicts between Tembe royal factions forced Hlubi and his followers to leave the Lebombo Mountains (leaving King Dlamini III behind) and moved southwards toward Mkhuze. In the 1700s, Hlubi and his people moved south to Mkhuze, encountering the Ndwandwe Kingdom, another major power in the Southern African region. A fierce battle with Ndwandwe forces at the Mkhuze River reportedly turned the river red with blood, giving rise to his praise name, “Blood of men that made the Mkhuze turn red.”

After the bloodshed, the families moved westward to Magudu and Godlwako. In Godlwako, they found the Nkambule and Sukati communities, who peacefully submitted to Hlubi's arrival.

Continuing westward, Hlubi eventually settled near the Pongola River, in the caves of Godlwako, which offered fertile land and safety from enemies. They left the Pongola and finally settled eTibondzeni. Between Lavumisa and Standerton Hlubi died.
