= Phongolo Nature Reserve =

Protected area in KwaZulu-Natal, South Africa

- IUCN category IV (habitat/species management area)
- Interactive map of Phongolo Nature Reserve
- Location: uPhongolo Local Municipality, Zululand District Municipality, KwaZulu-Natal
- Nearest city: Pongola
- Coordinates: 27°20′43″S 31°54′23″E
- Area: 10,485 hectares (25,910 acres)
- Designation: Important Bird Area
- Established: 1894 (original proclamation); 1979 (re-proclamation)
- Governing body: Ezemvelo KZN Wildlife

Phongolo Nature Reserve is a protected area managed by Ezemvelo KZN Wildlife in northern KwaZulu-Natal, South Africa. The reserve encompasses 10,485 hectares (25,910 acres) surrounding the Pongolapoort Dam (also known as Lake Jozini) in the Lebombo Mountains. First proclaimed in 1894 by President Paul Kruger of the South African Republic, it is the oldest formally protected nature reserve in South Africa and one of the oldest on the African continent.

The reserve forms part of a cooperative conservation initiative involving private landowners, tribal communities, and government conservation services, with the aim of establishing a large, ecologically and socio-economically viable "Big Five" reserve. It is designated as an Important Bird Area by BirdLife South Africa.

== History ==
=== Original proclamation ===
The Pongola Game Reserve was proclaimed in 1894 by President Paul Kruger of the South African Republic (Transvaal Republic). The reserve was established primarily to prohibit hunting in an area where game populations were being decimated through uncontrolled hunting, though it also served as an attempt to secure a potential route to the sea for the landlocked Transvaal Republic. This aspiration was thwarted when the British annexed much of Tongaland in April 1895, cutting off access to the coast.

=== Decline and dam construction ===
The reserve experienced significant disruption during the Second Boer War (1899–1902), which caused widespread devastation in the region. Subsequently, much of the game in the area was killed in an attempt to eradicate the tsetse fly, which transmits trypanosomiasis (sleeping sickness) to both humans and livestock.

Construction of the Pongolapoort Dam on the Phongolo River began in 1960, with the dam completed in 1973. The dam was built to supply irrigation water for sugarcane and cotton plantations on the adjacent Makhatini Flats. An estimated 17,000 hectares (42,000 acres) of the original reserve was inundated by the rising waters, and a portion of the remaining land was re-proclaimed as a nature conservation area in 1979.

=== Modern era ===
Today, the Pongolapoort Dam is the fourth-largest dam in South Africa. The reserve operates as part of a broader conservation landscape that includes the adjacent privately owned Pongola Game Reserve and forms part of the proposed Nsubane Pongola Transfrontier Conservation Area, a potential joint venture between South Africa and Eswatini.

== Geography ==
=== Location and topography ===
Phongolo Nature Reserve stretches from the shores of Pongolapoort Dam eastward to the crest of the Lebombo Mountains, which form the border with Eswatini. The western section of the reserve is underlain by basite of the uMfolozi River Formation, producing clay soils, while the eastern portion comprises a rocky escarpment of rhyolite of the Jozini Formation.

When full, the dam surface lies at an altitude of approximately 130 metres above sea level. The terrain rises steeply on the eastern shore to the reserve boundary at the summit of the Lebombo range (598 m a.s.l.). Much of the dam shoreline has a steep profile, though parts of the western shore slope gently, exposing mudflats when water levels drop.

=== Hydrology ===
The Phongolo River (meaning "trough" in isiZulu, referring to its long, deep pools with steep sides) feeds the dam from the north-west, exiting through the Pongola Gorge, an ancient cleft through the Lebombo Mountains. The dam and the Phongolo River downstream mark the southernmost natural limit for the African tigerfish (Hydrocynus vittatus), making it a prime destination for tiger fishing in South Africa.

=== Climate ===
The climate is arid and warm, with a mean annual temperature of 21°C. Average annual rainfall is 617 mm, falling predominantly in summer between November and March. The reserve lies within a malaria area, and visitors are advised to take appropriate precautions.

== Flora ==
The vegetation of the reserve is classified as Zululand Lowveld, consisting predominantly of acacia bushveld that slopes gently towards the dam and river. The reserve encompasses several distinct habitat types:

- Golela veld – A unique vegetation type in the lower-lying areas that provides important breeding habitat for the rare suni antelope (Neotragus moschatus).
- Lebombo Mountain forests – Species-rich forests on the eastern escarpment.
- Themeda grassveld – Open grassland scattered with knobthorn (Senegalia nigrescens) and marula (Sclerocarya birrea) trees.

The mountain slopes support populations of rare cycads, including Encephalartos ngoyanus and Encephalartos lebomboensis. The reserve serves as an important ecological corridor, connecting with the Ubombo Mountain Nature Reserve to the south, which protects one of the highest densities and diversity of endemic cycad species in KwaZulu-Natal.

Aquatic vegetation is generally not well developed due to fluctuating water levels in the dam.

== Fauna ==
=== Mammals ===
The reserve supports a diverse assemblage of large mammals, including two breeding herds of African elephant (Loxodonta africana). The Golela section of the reserve, managed directly by Ezemvelo KZN Wildlife, contains over 40 white rhinoceros (Ceratotherium simum), and guided rhino tracking walks are offered. Black rhinoceros (Diceros bicornis) have also been reintroduced.

Other mammals include African buffalo (Syncerus caffer), leopard (Panthera pardus), spotted hyena (Crocuta crocuta), giraffe (Giraffa camelopardalis), blue wildebeest (Connochaetes taurinus), Burchell's zebra (Equus quagga burchellii), Cape mountain zebra (Equus zebra zebra), greater kudu (Tragelaphus strepsiceros), impala (Aepyceros melampus), nyala (Tragelaphus angasii), waterbuck (Kobus ellipsiprymnus), common reedbuck (Redunca arundinum), mountain reedbuck (Redunca fulvorufula), common warthog (Phacochoerus africanus), and suni (Neotragus moschatus). The reserve supports approximately 60 mammal species in total.

Hippopotamus (Hippopotamus amphibius) and Nile crocodile (Crocodylus niloticus) are abundant in the dam. The African rock python (Python sebae natalensis) is also present.

=== Avifauna ===
Over 300 bird species have been recorded in the reserve, making it an important birding destination and a formally designated Important Bird Area. The reserve marks the southernmost limit of distribution for several significant species, including Burchell's starling (Lamprotornis australis) and magpie shrike (Corvinella melanoleuca).

The dam and its associated wetlands support important populations of waterbirds. Pink-backed pelican (Pelecanus rufescens) has bred here historically—one of only two breeding sites in South Africa—though breeding has not been recorded recently after fluctuating water levels killed the trees used for nesting. Yellow-billed stork (Mycteria ibis) has also bred at the site.

The reserve supports important populations of raptors and vultures, including resident colonies of white-backed vulture (Gyps africanus), lappet-faced vulture (Torgos tracheliotus), and white-headed vulture (Aegypius occipitalis). Cape vulture (Gyps coprotheres) are occasionally observed, though a former roost and possible breeding colony on the nearby Lebombo cliffs disappeared prior to 1975 for unknown reasons.

Other notable species include peregrine falcon (Falco peregrinus), bateleur (Terathopius ecaudatus), martial eagle (Polemaetus bellicosus), tawny eagle (Aquila rapax), African grass owl (Tyto capensis), black stork (Ciconia nigra), African marsh harrier (Circus ranivorus), lesser moorhen (Paragallinula angulata), black coucal (Centropus grillii), Natal spurfowl (Pternistis natalensis), red-crested korhaan (Lophotis ruficrista), white-throated robin-chat (Cossypha humeralis), burnt-necked eremomela (Eremomela usticollis), gorgeous bushshrike (Telophorus viridis), Rudd's apalis (Apalis ruddi), Neergaard's sunbird (Cinnyris neergaardi), pink-throated twinspot (Hypargos margaritatus), and lemon-breasted canary (Crithagra citrinipectus).

=== Fish ===
The Phongolo River system supports at least 25 indigenous fish species. The African tigerfish (Hydrocynus vittatus), a protected species in South Africa, reaches the southernmost extent of its natural distribution in the dam and river, making Phongolo a premier tiger fishing destination. Other species include Mozambique tilapia (Oreochromis mossambicus), redbreast tilapia (Coptodon rendalli), sharptooth catfish (Clarias gariepinus), silver catfish (Schilbe intermedius), and various barbs.

=== Reptiles and amphibians ===
The reserve supports close to 100 species of reptiles and amphibians.

== Conservation ==
=== Management ===
The reserve is managed by Ezemvelo KZN Wildlife in accordance with the National Environmental Management: Protected Areas Act (No. 57 of 2003). Raptors and vultures are monitored annually as part of aerial surveys conducted throughout Zululand.

=== Threats ===
Several conservation challenges affect the reserve:

- Water level fluctuations – Artificial changes in dam water levels have eliminated breeding habitat for pelicans and storks by killing the trees they used for nesting.
- Eutrophication – Fertiliser runoff from adjacent sugarcane plantations causes dense growth of blue-green algae in the dam's north-western section during early winter, temporarily degrading habitat quality for both birds and fish.
- Invasive species – The spread of invasive alien plants, particularly Parthenium hysterophorus, Hydrilla verticillata, and Chromolaena odorata, affects sections of the reserve.
- Elephant management – Movement of elephants between the reserve, the adjacent Pongola Game Reserve, and Royal Jozini Big 6 Private Estate in Eswatini has created management challenges, particularly during drought periods when low water levels allow animals to move around boundary fences.

=== Regional context ===
The reserve forms part of the larger Phongolo River and floodplain ecosystem, which extends downstream to Ndumo Game Reserve, a Ramsar Wetland of International Importance. The floodplain system is the largest in South Africa and supports the richest fish fauna of any South African river system, with many species at the southernmost extent of their distribution. Controlled flood releases from the Pongolapoort Dam are required to maintain the ecological functioning of the downstream floodplain, though implementation of release protocols has been inconsistent.

== Tourism ==
The reserve offers facilities for both day visitors and overnight guests:

- Eight-bed bush camp
- Camping and caravan sites with cold showers and flush toilets
- Picnic sites
- Two boat launch sites
- Self-drive game viewing
- Angling and boating (own boat required)
- Controlled hunting area

Swimming in the dam is prohibited due to the presence of crocodiles and hippopotami.

The reserve is accessible from the N2 highway between Pongola and Jozini.

== See also ==
- Hluhluwe–iMfolozi Park
- Lebombo Mountains
- Ndumo Game Reserve
- Phongolo River
- Pongolapoort Dam
