= Emalangeni (disambiguation) =

Emalangeni may refer to:

- Eswatini Lilangeni (currency) - the official currency of Eswatini, abbreviated as SZL, with the singular form called lilangeni and plural emalangeni.
- Emalangeni (people) - an early Nguni-speaking community associated with the inland branch of the proto-Embo groups of the Maputaland-Lubombo region, ancestral to the Swazi people and the Dlamini dynasty.
