= 2023 in Eswatini =

- Years in Eswatini: 2020 2021 2022 2023 2024 2025 2026
- Centuries: 20th century · 21st century · 22nd century
- Decades: 1990s 2000s 2010s 2020s 2030s 2040s 2050s
- Years: 2020 2021 2022 2023 2024 2025 2026

- Decades: 2000s; 2010s; 2020s
- See also: Other events of 2023; Timeline of Eswatini history

Events in the year 2023 in Eswatini

== Incumbents ==
- Monarch (Ngwenyama): Mswati III
- Prime Minister:
  - Cleopas Dlamini (till 28 September)
  - Mgwagwa Gamedze (from 28 September till 3 November)
  - Russell Dlamini (acting since 4 November)

== Events ==
Ongoing — COVID-19 pandemic in Eswatini, 2021-2022 Eswatini protests

- 2023 Swazi general election
