= 2022 in Eswatini =

- Years in Eswatini: 2019 2020 2021 2022 2023 2024 2025
- Centuries: 20th century · 21st century · 22nd century
- Decades: 1990s 2000s 2010s 2020s 2030s 2040s 2050s
- Years: 2019 2020 2021 2022 2023 2024 2025

- Decades: 2000s; 2010s; 2020s
- See also: Other events of 2022; Timeline of Eswatini history

Events in the year 2022 in Eswatini

== Incumbents ==
- Monarch (Ngwenyama): Mswati III
- Prime Minister: Cleopas Dlamini

== Events ==
Ongoing — COVID-19 pandemic in Eswatini, 2021-2022 Eswatini protests

- 23 August – Three new Cyber laws come into effect; the Computer Crime and Cyber Crime Act, 2022, the Data Protection Act, 2022, and the Electronic Communications and Transactions Act, 2022.
- 4 September – King Mswati III is accused of delaying national dialogue in regards to the anti-monarchy protests.
