= Litshe laNgwane =

Important rock in South Africa associated with Eswatini King Ngwane III

- Location: Near Pongola, KwaZulu-Natal, South Africa
- Founder: King Ngwane III, son of Dlamini III

Litshe laNgwane (also spelt Litje laNgwane; "Rock of Ngwane") is a rocky outcrop located about 35 kilometres outside the town of Pongola, along the road to Piet Retief, just outside the present-day border of Eswatini in South Africa.

The stone is very important to Swazi - being the stone where the early Swazi King Ngwane III used to play as a young boy. On top the rock is basin-like and held rain water in which Ngwane III used to bathe.

Ngwane III frequented the Litshe laNgwane and hot water pools near Godlwako.

According to oral traditions recorded for the Swaziland Oral History Project, the young Ngwane III would climb the steep sides of this rock to play. When Ngwane III was installed as king in 1745, his homestead was moved from Matsapha to Zombodze, approximately 7.5 kilometres northwest of Godlwako. Despite it being located outside Eswatini due to the Scramble for Africa colonial borderlines, the rock remains a site of cultural importance for Eswatini.
