= Emalangeni (people) =

Early Nguni-speaking community associated with Chief Langa

Regions with significant populations
- Maputaland-Lubombo region

Languages
- Nguni languages (early forms), Proto-Embo-Nguni

Religion
- Traditional African religion

Related ethnic groups
- Embo-Dlamini, Embo-Nguni, Ngwane people, House of Dlamini, Hlubi people, Tembe people

Emalangeni (also Embo-Dlamini or Nguni-Dlamini) was an early Nguni-speaking community in the Maputaland-Lubombo region of southeastern Africa.

The term is historically used to refer to the followers and descendants of Chief Langa within the broader Embo groups. It means "people of Langa" and functioned to refer to the community of early Swazi people that Langa led as Chief.

"Emalangeni" also survives in the praise names of the Dlamini clan, the current rulers of the Kingdom of Eswatini.
