= Lebombo =

Lebombo may refer to:

- Lebombo bone, an ancient tally stick
- Lebombo flat lizard
- Lebombo Mountains, Southern Africa
  - Lebombo monocline, a geological feature of these mountains; see Explora Escarpment
- Androstachys johnsonii, also known as Lebombo ironwood
- Diocese of Lebombo
