= 2025 in Eswatini =

- Decades: 2000s; 2010s; 2020s
- See also: Other events of 2025; Timeline of Eswatini history

Events in the year 2025 in Eswatini

== Incumbents ==
- Monarch (Ngwenyama): Mswati III
- Prime Minister: Russell Dlamini

== Events ==
- January – The government announce a partnership with Google.
- 24 March – Eswatini Mobile announces that it has 'entered the 5G era'.
- 16 July – Five criminal deportees from the U.S. are received under a third-country agreement after months of diplomatic talks.
- 25 July – Protesters demonstrate outside the US embassy in Ezulwini against the recent deportation deal.
- 6 October – Eswatini receives 10 third-country nationals deported from the United States under an agreement with the Trump administration.
- 18 November – Eswatini becomes the first African country to receive the twice-yearly HIV prevention injection drug lenacapavir.
- 1 December – Eswatini begins administering lenacapavir.
- 12 December – Eswatini and the United States sign a five-year health cooperation agreement focused on health system development with HIV prevention and disease monitoring.

== Holidays ==
- 1 January – New Year's Day
- 18 April – Good Friday
- 19 April – King's Birthday
- 21 April – Easter Monday
- 25 April – National Flag Day
- 1 May – Labour Day
- 29 May – Ascension Day
- 22 July – King Father's Birthday
- 2 September – Umhlanga
- 6 September – Somhlolo Day
- 18 December – Incwala
- 25 December – Christmas Day
- 26 December – Boxing Day

== Deaths ==
- 29 June – Mabandla Dlamini, 94, prime minister (1979–1983).

== See also ==
- Music of Eswatini
