= Dlamini I =

16th century Eswatini leader

- Early leader of the House of Dlamini
- Reign: 16th century
- Successor: Mswati I
- Issue: Mswati I; Mathonga
- Dynasty: House of Dlamini
- Father: Chief Langa (according to oral history)
- Religion: Traditional African religion

Dlamini I (also known as Matalatala) was a 16th-century Embo-Nguni prince and early leader of the House of Dlamini in Eswatini. He was the founder of the Embo-Dlamini line.

Dlamini I's people and ancestors historically lived in the region around the Tembe River and were subjects of the powerful Tembe Kingdom, which derived its influence and wealth from coastal trade networks and exercised authority across the Lubombo Mountains and southwards toward the Lusutfu River.

== Family and succession ==
Dlamini I was the father of Mswati I and Prince Mathonga. According to Swazi oral tradition recorded by historians such as J.S.M. Matsebula and A.T. Bryant, Dlamini I was a son of Chief Ngwane I and grandson of chief Langa, leader of an Embo-Nguni community that settled within the Tembe territories near Delagoa Bay. Oral accounts state that Langa had two sons, Dlamini I and Hlubi, whose followers later separated and migrated in different directions. Dlamini's followers moved northward across the Lubombo Mountains and formed early Ngwane communities, while Hlubi's followers migrated southward along the Pongola River and became the ancestors of the amaHlubi.

Following Dlamini I's death, leadership passed to Mswati I. Unlike his brother Mathonga, who was described as quiet and politically restrained, Mswati I was warlike and highly mobile. He frequently relocated his bases and conducted raids against neighbouring groups in pursuit of land and cattle.

According to historian J.S.M. Matsebula, cattle captured during Mswati I's raids were often transferred to his brother Mathonga, reinforcing internal cohesion within the ruling house.
