= 1978 in Eswatini =

- Decades: 1950s; 1960s; 1970s; 1980s; 1990s
- See also: Other events of 1978; Timeline of Eswatini history

The following lists events that happened during 1978 in Eswatini.

== Incumbents ==
- Ngwenyama of Swaziland: Sobhuza II
- Prime Minister of Swaziland: Maphevu Dlamini

== Events ==
- October 13 - Monarch Sobhuza II introduces a new constitution.

=== Date unknown ===
- The Tinkhundla governance system is established.

== Births ==
- 3 March - Bright Nxumalo, international footballer

== See also ==
- History of Eswatini
