= 2021 in Eswatini =

- Decades: 2000s; 2010s; 2020s
- See also: Other events of 2021; Timeline of Eswatini history

Events in the year 2021 in Eswatini

== Incumbents ==
- Monarch (Ngwenyama): Mswati III
- Prime Minister: Themba N. Masuku (until 19 July), Cleopas Dlamini (starting 19 July)

== Events ==
Ongoing — COVID-19 pandemic in Eswatini, 2021 Eswatini protests

- 25 January – Two in Eswatini die and thousands are homeless throughout Southern Africa as Cyclone Eloise causes extensive flooding.
- 20 February – King Mswati III says he has recuperated from COVID-19 and thanks Taiwan for sending the necessary medication. He did not specify what drug that was. Eswatini is the only country in Africa that recognizes Taiwan. There have been 17,000 COVID-19 infections and 644 related deaths in the kingdom.
- 11 March – Eswatini receives a shipment of 20,000 doses of the Oxford-AstraZeneca vaccine through the COVAX vaccine-sharing initiative.
- 29 June – Acting Prime Minister Themba Masuku denies reports that King Mswati III has fled the country amid ongoing nationwide protests.
- 13 October – Pro-democracy protests intensify in Eswatini, as police use tear gas and water cannons to disperse crowds during this week's protests. Government spokespeople have denied to comment as King Mswati III denies accusations of autocratic rule in the last absolutist monarchy in Africa.
- 18 October – Prime Minister Cleopas Dlamini orders the closure of schools across Eswatini in an attempt to stop pro-democracy protests that have occurred across the kingdom in the past few months. Protesters demand an end to the absolute monarchy of King Mswati III, the last of its kind in Africa, as ministers back the move, saying that there "is no room for such anarchy in our society".
- 22 October – Police and the army open fire on a group of health workers protesting outside a hospital in Eswatini, injuring 30 people.

== Deaths ==
- 11 January – Mario Masuku, politician (b. 1951).
- 19 January – Ellinah Wamukoya, 69, politician and Anglican bishop; COVID-19. (b. 1951).
