= Mswati =

There have been three leaders of Swaziland with the name Mswati.

- Chief Mswati I, c. 1480 – c. 1520
- King Mswati II, 1840–1868
- King Mswati III, since 1986

== See also ==
- List of monarchs of Eswatini
