= Langa (ruler) =

- Embo-Nguni chief
- Reign: c. early precolonial period
- Born: Southeastern Africa (Maputaland-Lubombo region)
- Died: Tembeland
- Issue: Dlamini I; Hlubi; (according to oral history)
- House: House of Langa (Emalangeni)
- Dynasty: Embo-Nguni
- Religion: Traditional African religion

Langa was an early precolonial Embo-Nguni chief in the Maputaland-Lubombo region of Southern Africa. He ruled a chiefdom within the Tembe Kingdom.

His followers within the Embo groups were referred to as Emalangeni ("people of Langa"), Embo-Dlamini or Nguni-Dlamini, as they were later called during the reign his son Dlamini I, and Amahlubi, descendants of his elder son Prince Hlubi.
