= J.S.M. Matsebula Collection =

Eswatini historical archival items

- Established: 1989
- Location: University of Eswatini Library, Kwaluseni, Eswatini
- Type: Archival collection

The J.S.M. Matsebula Collection is an archival collection housed at the Library of the University of Eswatini in Kwaluseni.

With 170 items, the collection was formally deposited in November 1989 by historian J.S.M. Matsebula to the university and forms part of the university’s Swaziana holdings.

== Background ==
J.S.M. Matsebula (1918–1993) was a leading Swazi historian and linguist, best known for authoring several editions of A History of Swaziland and for his role in the development of written Siswati. He also served for many years as chief counsellor and private secretary to King Sobhuza II.

In 1989, Matsebula donated the collection of work to the library of the University of Eswatini, which includes Matsebula’s papers and manuscripts as well as official correspondence from the mid-19th century that Matsebula obtained during his years of research on Swazi history.
