= 2017 in Eswatini =

- Decades: 1990s; 2000s; 2010s; 2020s
- See also: Other events of 2017; Timeline of Eswatini history

Eswatini formerly known as Swaziland now officially the Kingdom of Eswatini is landlocked country in Southern Africa.

Events in the year 2017 in Eswatini.

== Incumbents ==
- Monarch (Ngwenyama): Mswati III
- Prime Minister: Barnabas Sibusiso Dlamini

== Events ==
in 2017, Eswatini continued to repress political dissent and failed to fulfill the human rights of its estimated 1.4 million population. The country under the absolute monarchy rule of king Mswati III, who has been its ruler since 1986 continued to violate human rights, and political parties remained banned as they have been since the year 1973. countless political and socio-economic challenges arose which drew the world's attention including the highest HIV infection rate in the world at 26 percent which was reported by the United Nations International Children's Emergency Fund (UNICEF).

The country's judiciary system independence was in question as it was highly compromised and authoritarian laws continued to be used to target critics of the government and the king, even though there were basic rights guarantees in Swaziland's 2005 constitution.

== Deaths ==
- 7 February – Sotsha Dlamini, politician (b. 1940).
