= 2020 in Eswatini =

- Decades: 2000s; 2010s; 2020s
- See also: Other events of 2020; Timeline of Eswatini history

Events in the year 2020 in Eswatini.

== Incumbents ==
- Monarch (Ngwenyama): Mswati III
- Prime Minister: Ambrose Mandvulo Dlamini (until 13 December)
  Themba N. Masuku (since 13 December)

== Events ==
- 14 March – The country's first case of COVID-19 was confirmed. A 33-year-old woman, who returned from the United States at the end of February and then travelled to Lesotho before returning home to Eswatini, entered isolation.

== Deaths ==
- The COVID-19 pandemic in Eswatini caused 1427 deaths.
- On June 9th, an inmate was allegedly beat to death by prison guards

=== December ===
- 13 December: Ambrose Mandvulo Dlamini, Prime Minister since 2018 dies from COVID-19 at the age of 52.
