= Lubhuku =

Lubhuku is a village in eastern Eswatini in Lubombo Region. It lies about 30 kilometres west of Siteki and 60 kilometres north of Big Bend and Mayaluka on the western side of the Lubombo Mountains.
