= Bemdzabuko =

Precolonial Swazi groups identified in early kingdom formation

The Bemdzabuko (also called Bemdzabu; Siswati: meaning "original Swazi people") is a term historically used during Eswatini's precolonial settlement and expansion to refer to the "original" Swazi people. It distinguished them from groups within the Sotho and Nguni ethnic identity that were already settled in the Eswatini area, known as the Emakhandzambili and from later arrivals, referred to as Emafikamuva ("those who came after the Bemdzabuko had settled").

Notable clans among the Bemdzabuko include the Dlamini, Mhlanga, Madonsela, Mavuso, Fakudze, Hlophe, Mabuza, Simelane, Matsebula, Thwala, Ngwenya, Manana, Sihlongonyane, Nkonyane and Mkhabela.
