= Pongola, KwaZulu-Natal =

Pongola oPhongolo
- Location within KwaZulu-Natal Location within South Africa
- Coordinates: 27°22′43″S 31°37′04″E
- Country: South Africa
- Province: KwaZulu-Natal
- District: Zululand
- Municipality: uPhongolo

Government

Area
  - Total: 3.60 km^{2} (1.39 sq mi)

Population (2011)
  - Total: 1,403
  - Density: 390/km^{2} (1,010/sq mi)

Racial makeup (2011)
  - Black African: 37.9%
  - Coloured: 0.6%
  - Indian/Asian: 3.4%
  - White: 57.3%
  - Other: 0.6%

First languages (2011)
  - Afrikaans: 55.6%
  - Zulu: 30.5%
  - English: 8.6%
  - Swazi: 1.4%
  - Other: 3.9%
- Time zone: UTC+2 (SAST)
- Postal code (street): 3170
- PO box: 3170
- Area code: 034

Pongola (also known in Zulu as oPhongolo) is a town on the north bank of the uPhongolo River, in a fertile valley on the N2, near the Lubombo Mountains, in the valleys of Zululand, easily accessible to the Swaziland border posts. It was part of the Transvaal panhandle between the Phongolo (Natal) and Swaziland (now Eswatini) until 1994, when it was transferred to KwaZulu-Natal.

The town takes its name from the uPhongolo River, which in turn derives its name from the isiZulu word for a barrel, vat, trough, or cask.

It is a unique and tranquil subtropical environment. It has more than 50 km^{2} of sugarcane and subtropical fruit plantations surrounding it. During the Depression years of the 1930s, drastic irrigation systems were started in Pongola for sugar cane farms. The town thrived as a result of the canal system and a sugar mill that was built. Today it is part of the uPhongolo Local Municipality.

Pongolapoort Dam and Pongola Game Reserve is to the east. It is the only dam in South Africa where African tigerfish (family Alestidæ) can be caught.

== Government ==
The uPhongolo Local Municipality is one of five local municipalities located within the area of the Zululand District Municipality. The municipality is governed by the ANC Council consisting of 22 Councillors and an executive committee and Hon. Cllr Winile Nhlabathi is the Mayor. The administrative functions are performed by the Municipal Manager and a team of managers. Among other schools, there are Pongola Akademie, Dingukwazi Senior Secondary School and Langa High School.

== Economy ==
Pongola is surrounded by hunting lodges and several have the Big Five. Some farms specialise in biltong hunting and others concentrate on trophy hunting.

Richard Antoine Rouillard, born in the Phoenix district of Mauritius in 1873, was the driving force behind the agricultural and economic prosperity of the Louwsburg and Magut districts. The pioneering spirit which opened up the interior of South Africa came in a variety of guises.

Pongola is home to Tugam Game Farm, uPhongolo's oldest game reserve.

== Pongolites ==
People who lived in Pongola, or have a connection to the town and region:

- Zwide kaLanga (c. 1758–1825), was the king of the Ndwandwe (Nxumalo) nation from about 1805 to about 1820. His royal capital was located on Magudu Mountain, which is located between Pongola and Nongoma. He was killed by Shaka's soldiers south of present-day Pongola on the mountain that now bears his name, Zwide. His indunas buried him on the southern slopes of Magudu Mountain, where other Ndwandwe chiefs are also buried, in the forest considered sacred by the AmaNdwandwe.
- The Royal House of Hlongwane: According to AmaNgwane traditional leaders, Sangweni of Hlongwane of Mntungwa-Ngwane was the king of AmaNgwane around 1600. He led The Ngwane from Phongola, Ezibukweni to the headwaters of the White Umfolzi River, near Vryheid.
- Johan Kriek (born 1958), former South African and later American tennis player.
- Lucas Sithole (1931–1994), South African sculptor.
- Impi Visser (born 1995), South African rugby sevens player.
- Nicolene Woschitz (born Smit), short story writer, teacher at Pongola Primary School, farmer and author of the book about the history of the town and region, Die Pongola-Vallei. Jewel of Kwazulu-Natal [The Pongola Valley. Jewel of KwaZulu-Natal].

== See also ==
- Ndwandwe
- Pongola Commando
