= Lucas Sithole =

South African sculptor

- Born: 1931; Springs, South Africa
- Died: 1994 (aged 62–63)
- Known for: Sculpture

Lucas Sithole OIS (1931–1994) was a South African sculptor best known for his work in mainly indigenous woods, as well as for his sculptures in bronze, stone, and other media.

He was born on 15 November 1931 in Springs, Transvaal, Union of South Africa, and died on 8 May 1994 in Pongola, KwaZulu-Natal, South Africa. He was born to a Zulu father and a Swazi mother, and was married with seven children. He lived in Kwa-Thema, Springs, until 1981, when he moved to the Pongola area near the Swaziland (now Eswatini) border.

== More information ==
- Lucas Sithole 1958 - 1979 by F.F. Haenggi - ISBN 0-620-03982-5
- African Arts Magazine, UCLA James S. Coleman African Studies Center, Los Angeles ("Lucas Sithole by F.F. Haenggi", Review by John Povey: August, 1980, Vol. 13, No. 4: 26-27+85) - ISSN 0001-9933
- Images of Man - Contemporary S.A. Black Art and Artists, 1992 (de Jager), pp. 120/124 - ISBN 1-86810-015-4
- OUR ART 4 ONS KUNS, 1993 (Marilyn Martin) pp. 178–185 - ISBN 0-7970-2832-3
- Lucas Sithole 1931-1994 - Highlights 1966-1993 (F.F. Haenggi) - ISBN 978-3-033-04655-9
- Full bibliography on http://www.sithole.com/Bibliography.htm
- 6 Educational Documentaries on Lucas SITHOLE linked on his memorial website
- http://www.sithole.com/ (original memorial site)
- https://art-archives-southafrica.com/lucas-sithole-updates (addendum to original memorial site)
