= 2024 in Eswatini =

- Decades: 2000s; 2010s; 2020s
- See also: Other events of 2024; Timeline of Eswatini history

Events in the year 2024 in Eswatini

== Incumbents ==
- Monarch (Ngwenyama): Mswati III
- Prime Minister: Russell Dlamini

== Events ==
=== June ===
- 26 June - Eswatini hosts the Sustainable Cooling Summit 2024 in Manzini, highlighting climate action, sustainable cooling, a partnership with Italy, and plans for a plastic bag ban.

=== July ===
- 15 July - Former MPs Mduduzi Bacede Mabuza and Mthandeni Dube are sentenced to lengthy prison terms under the Suppression of Terrorism Act and the Sedition and Subversive Activities Act for allegedly inciting unrest during the 2021–2023 Eswatini protests.

=== August ===
- 13 August - The Supreme Court upholds a controversial provision of the 1938 Sedition and Subversive Activities Act.

=== November ===
- The Supreme Court rules in favor of multiple suspended junior police and correctional officers, ordering the government to implement a previously promised salary increase.

== Holidays ==
- 1 January – New Year's Day
- 29 March – Good Friday
- 1 April – Easter Monday
- 19 April – King's Birthday
- 25 April – National Flag Day
- 1 May – Labour Day
- 9 May – Ascension Day
- 22 July – King Father's Birthday
- 2 September – Umhlanga
- 6 September – Somhlolo Day
- 18 December – Incwala
- 25 December – Christmas Day
- 26 December – Boxing Day

== See also ==
- Music of Eswatini
