= Nyaka (Southern African clan) =

Southern African clan linked to early Swazi history

Regions with significant populations
- Mozambique, South Africa (particularly Mpumalanga)

Languages
- Xitsonga, Historical Nguni varieties

Religion
- Traditional African religion; some Christian influences

Related ethnic groups
- Swazi people, Tembe people, Embo-Nguni, Embo-Dlamini, Tsonga-Nguni

The Nyaka are a Southern African Tsonga people clan historically located along the Delagoa Bay coast and the low-lying coastal plains of the Maputaland-Lubombo region, which spans parts of Mozambique, South Africa and Eswatini. They are considered one of the ancestral groups connected to the formation of the Swazi people and the later Kingdom of Eswatini polity. Along with the Tembe, the Nyaka were among the earliest Bantu-speaking peoples encountered by the Portuguese in the region in the mid-1500s.
