= Emafikamuva =

Late-arriving clans incorporated into the Swazi state

The Emafikamuva (Siswati: meaning "those who came late") refers to groups that arrived in the Eswatini region after the Bemdzabuko ("original ones") and Emakhandzambili ("those found ahead") had settled.

These groups were often refugees or migrants seeking protection from Swazi rulers and were incorporated into the Swazi state as subordinate or client groups.

Notable clans among the Emafikamuva include the Nkambule, Nhlengethwa, Mathunjwa, Mtsetfwa, Dladla, Mngometfulu, Mabaso, Tsela and Masuku. Their inclusion expanded the kingdom’s manpower and influence during its serious military expansion across the 19th century under King Mswati II.
