= Pongola Commando =

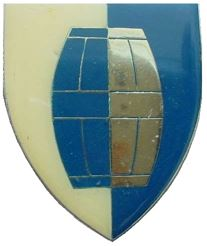
- Pongola Commando emblem
- Disbanded: February 14, 2003 (23 years ago)
- Country: South Africa
- Allegiance: Republic of South Africa; Republic of South Africa
- Branch: South African Army; South African Army
- Type: Infantry
- Role: Light Infantry
- Size: One Battalion
- Part of: South African Infantry Corps; Army Territorial Reserve
- Garrison/HQ: Pongola

Pongola Commando was a light infantry regiment of the South African Army and was based in the town of Pongola. It formed part of the South African Army Infantry Formation as well as the South African Territorial Reserve.

== History ==
=== Origin ===
This unit was created by merging the Pongola Company of the Piet Retief Commando with the North Coast Commando on 17 October 1970.

=== Operations ===
==== With the SADF ====
Under the SADF, the unit was mainly engaged in area force protection, search and cordones as well as stock theft control assistance to the rural police.

During severe Tropical Storm Domoina in 1984, the unit provided civil protection support through establishing a communication network, by distributing much needed food and emergency supplies, and a range of other civil defence measures.

==== With the SANDF ====
===== Disbandment =====
This unit, along with all other Commando units, was phased out between 2003 and 2008 following a decision by South African President Thabo Mbeki. According to the then Minister of Safety and Security, Charles Nqakula, the decision formed part of a national process to abolish the commando system and to establish new structures for local security.

== Unit Insignia ==
The unit's insignia features a barrel or vat, a design inspired by the town's name, which is derived from the uPhongolo River, itself named after the isiZulu word for barrel, vat, trough, or cask.

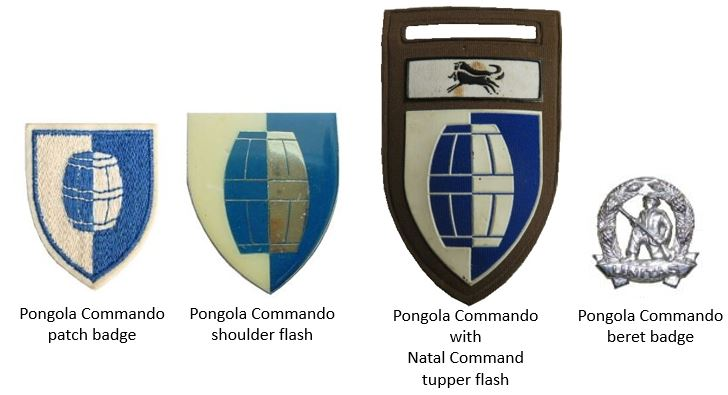
SADF era Pongola Commando insignia

== Leadership ==
Leadership
From	Honorary Colonels	To	Ribbon
	No known incumbents		
From	Commanding Officers	To	Ribbon
1970	Comdt N.J. Robertse	1978	
1978	Comdt J. Bezuidenhout	1980	
August 1980	Comdt Jhr. L.J.S. Changuion SM,DTM	March 1985	Southern Cross Medal SM Danie Theron Medal DTM
1985	Comdt C. Rudolph	1989	
1989	Comdt D. Barnard	?	
From	Regimental Sergeants Major	To	Ribbon
	No known incumbents		

The unit's commanding officers listed above generally held the rank of commandant.

== See also ==
- South African Commando System
