= Bright Nxumalo =

Swazi footballer (born 1978)

Personal information
- Full name: Bright Nxumalo
- Date of birth: 3 March 1978 (age 48)
- Place of birth: Swaziland
- Position: Goalkeeper

Senior career*
Years	Team	Apps	(Gls)
2002–	Eleven Men in Flight		

International career
2002–2008	Swaziland	4	(0)
- * Club domestic league appearances and goals

Bright Nxumalo (born 3 March 1978) is a Swaziland international footballer who plays as a goalkeeper. As of February 2010, he plays for Eleven Men in Flight in the Swazi Premier League and has won four caps for his country.
