= Ludvonga I =

King of Swazi people from c.1685 to 1715

- King of the Swazi people
- Reign: 1685 to 1715
- Predecessor: Magudulela
- Successor: Dlamini III
- Died: 1715
- Spouse: Lomakhetfwa, Dzambile
- Issue: Hlubi Dlamini; Loziyingile Dlamini; Mamba Dlamini; Dlamini III
- Dynasty: Dlamini
- Father: Magudulela
- Religion: African traditional religion

Ludvonga I was a Swazi king from c.1685 to 1715. He was the founder of the line that would establish the early modern Kingdom of Eswatini. He was the father of Hlubi Dlamini and Dlamini III.

Following his death in 1715, the kingship passed to his son Dlamini III.

Oral histories collected by the Swaziland Oral History Project note that Prince Hlubi Dlamini was the heir apparent but never ascended the throne following his father King Ludvonga I's death due to threats to his life within the royal family and his brother Dlamini III took over the reign instead.
