= Explora Escarpment =

Location of Explora Escarpment Princess Martha Coast, Antarctica

Explora Escarpment (70°33′S 15°0′W) is an undersea escarpment named for the Antarctic science ship F.S. Explora. The name, proposed by Dr. Heinrich Hinze of the Alfred Wegener Institute for Polar and Marine Research, Bremerhaven, Germany, was approved by the Advisory Committee for Undersea Features in June 1997.

The Explora Escarpment was aligned with the Lebombo monocline in southern Africa before the break-up of Gondwana.
