= Emakhandzambili =

Ancient Southern African communities

The Emakhandzambili (Siswati: meaning "those found ahead") refers to the groups that were already settled in the Eswatini region prior to the migration of the Dlamini-led Swazi people.

The Emakhandzambili were primarily of Sotho and Tsonga origin and were incorporated into the Swazi polity by the Bemdzabuko ("original Swazis") during the 18th and 19th centuries when the Kingdom of Eswatini was rising. The term also distinguished the Emakhandzambili from the Emafikamuva ("those who came later").

Prominent Emakhandzambili clans include the Maseko, Magagula, Mnisi, Makhubu, Mashinini, Msimango, Motsa, Mahlangu, Gwebu, Bhembe, Zwane, Shongwe, Tsabetse, Shabalala, Maziya, Sifundza and Ngcampalala. These clans were integrated into the Swazi kingdom and their inclusion expanded the kingdom’s manpower and influence.
