= Philip Bonner =

Historian of South Africa (1945–2017)

- Born: 31 March 1945; Leeds, United Kingdom
- Died: 24 September 2017 (aged 72)

Academic background
- Education: SOAS University of London

Academic work
- Discipline: Historian
- Sub-discipline: History of South Africa; Social history Labour history
- Institutions: University of the Witwatersrand

Philip Lewis Bonner (31 March 1945 – 24 September 2017) was a historian of South Africa. He was an Emeritus Professor at the University of the Witwatersrand with a focus on labour and urban history.

== Academic career ==
Bonner was hired in 1971 in the history department of the University of the Witwatersrand to establish African history as a scholarly field. His early work was concerned with the Swazi Kingdom in the nineteenth century, and resulted in his first monograph, based on his doctoral thesis, published in 1983. In 1977, following the Soweto uprising, Bonner was involved in the founding of the History Workshop at the University of the Witwatersrand, and was its chair from 1987–2012. Inspired by the History Workshop Journal at the University of Oxford, the scholars at Witwatersrand championed local social history and emphasised the use of oral testimonies. He was chair of the group from 1987 until 2012. From 1979, Bonner sat on the editorial board of the South African Labour Bulletin. Between 1998 and 2003, he was head of the History Department at Witwatersrand. In 2007, Bonner was awarded a National Research Foundation Chair in Local Histories and Present Realities, which he held until his retirement in 2012.

Beyond academic writing, he was involved in the development of the Apartheid Museum in Johannesburg, and was the historical consultant on a documentary series about Soweto.

== Trade union activism ==
In addition to his academic activities, Bonner was involved in worker education and trade unions, affiliated particularly with the ideology of 'workerism'. In the 1980s, he served as the education officer for the Federation of South African Trade Unions.

== Major publications ==
- Bonner, Philip (1982). Kings, Commoners and Concessionaires: The Evolution and Dissolution of the Nineteenth-Century Swazi State (PDF). Cambridge University Press. ISBN 0-52124270-3.
- Bonner, Philip; Delius, Peter; Posel, Deborah, eds. (1993). Apartheid's Genesis, 1935–1962. Ravan Press.
- Bonner, Philip; Segal, Lauren (1998). Soweto: A History. Maskew Miller Longman.
- Bonner, Philip; Nieftagodien, Noor (2001). Kathorus: A History. Maskew Miller Longman.
- Bonner, Philip; Esterhuysen, Amanda; Jenkins, Trefor, eds. (2007). A Search for Origins: Science, history and South Africa's 'Cradle of Humankind'. Wits University Press. doi:10.18772/22007104181. ISBN 9781868146697.
- Swanepoel, Natalie; Esterhuysen, Amanda; Bonner, Philip, eds. (2008). Five Hundred Years Rediscovered: Southern African Precedents And Prospects. Wits University Press. doi:10.18772/22008084747. ISBN 9781868146352.
- Bonner, Philip; Nieftagodien, Noor (2008). Alexandra: A History. Wits University Press. doi:10.18772/22008114808. ISBN 9781868146147.
- Bonner, Philip; Nieftagodien, Noor; Mathabatha, Sello (2012). Ekurhuleni: The Making of an Urban Region. Wits University Press. doi:10.18772/22012115430. ISBN 9781868145997.
