= A History of Swaziland =

1972 book by J.S.M. Matsebula

- Cover of the 1972 Longman Southern Africa edition
- Author: J.S.M. Matsebula
- Language: English
- Subject: History of Swaziland (Eswatini)
- Genre: History
- Published: 1972 (1st ed.); 1976 (2nd ed.); 1988 (3rd ed.) Longman Southern Africa, Cape Town
- Publisher: Longman Penguin Southern Africa
- Publication place: South Africa
- Media type: Print
- Pages: 131 (1st ed.); 218 (2nd ed.); 377 (3rd ed.)
- ISBN: 9780582603240

A History of Swaziland is a history book by Swazi historian and linguist J.S.M. Matsebula. Originally published in 1972, it was republished in multiple editions by Longman Southern Africa, including a third edition in 1988.

== Contents ==
It documents the political, social and cultural development of Swaziland (now Eswatini) from its early history through the twentieth century.

Subsequent editions expanded on its historical coverage of Swaziland and became one of the cited accounts of Swaziland's precolonial ethnic formations, colonial encounters and transition into independence.

Its contents span topics from early inhabitants and the early formation of political units in the region to reigns of major Swazi leaders such as King Dlamini III, King Ngwane III, King Ndvungunye, Sobhuza I, King Mswati II and King Mbandzeni to era of British and Boer colonial administrations during the reigns of King Bhunu and King Sobhuza II.
