= A. T. Bryant =

British-born missionary, linguist and historian of southern Africa (1865–1953)

- Born: Alfred Thomas Bryant; 26 February 1865; London, United Kingdom
- Died: 19 June 1953; Cambridge, United Kingdom
- Education: Birkbeck College, University of London
- Occupations: Missionary; linguist; historian
- Known for: Zulu linguistics; early history of Zulu people and Natal

Alfred Thomas Bryant (commonly known as A. T. Bryant; also referred to as Father David; 26 February 1865 - 19 June 1953) was a British-born Catholic missionary, linguist and historian who worked in Natal Province and Zululand (South Africa) from the 1880s to the 1920s. He is best known for his writings on Zulu language, history and indigenous knowledge systems.

He was educated at the Birkbeck Literary and Scientific Institute, later known as Birkbeck College of the University of London.

== Missionary work in southern Africa ==
In 1883, at the age of eighteen, Bryant migrated to Natal in South Africa and joined the Trappist mission at Mariannhill, where he undertook theological and philosophical studies and initiated missionary work among surrounding African communities. He also opened the first boys’ boarding school at the mission.

In 1887, Bryant returned to Europe, where he was ordained as a Catholic priest at the Archbasilica of Saint John Lateran in Rome by the Latin Patriarch of Constantinople. He celebrated his first mass at St. Peter’s Basilica.

After returning to southern Africa, Bryant spent three years working among the Xhosa and Thembu communities in the Transkei. In 1896, with the permission of the British Resident, he established a Catholic mission station on the oNgoye range between the Mlalazi River and the Mhlathuze River in Zululand. He remained based in Zululand for several decades, during which time he lived and worked closely with Zulu communities.

== Scholarship and career ==
Bryant is particularly remembered for his contributions to Zulu linguistics. In 1905, he published A Zulu-English Dictionary, which became a standard reference work, followed in 1917 by An Abridged English-Zulu Word-book. He also founded the first newspaper published in the Zulu language called Izindaba Zabantu (“The People’s News”), in 1903 and authored several smaller works written in Zulu like Ukuphila Kwomzimba ("The Health of the Body") and Imisebenzi Yamapulazi ("The Work of the Farms").

His historical writings include Olden Times in Zululand and Natal (1929), which presents an account of regional history from the sixteenth century to the reign of King Shaka, and The Zulu People Before the White Man Came (1949). While written from a missionary perspective, these works are regarded as significant early attempts to document precolonial Zulu history.

Bryant conducted detailed studies of Zulu medicinal practices, including the training of healers and the medicinal use of plants. His research was published as the article Zulu Medicine and Medicine Men in the Annals of the Natal Museum in 1909 and later reprinted in book form in 1966. This work is regarded as the first published study of Zulu medicinal plants. Many plant specimens he collected were identified by botanist John Medley Wood.

From 1920 to 1923, Bryant served as a lecturer and research fellow in Bantu Studies at the University of the Witwatersrand, where he introduced courses in anthropology. In 1939, he was awarded an honorary doctorate in literature by the same institution.

In his later years, Bryant returned to England, where he died in Cambridge on 19 June 1953.

== Works ==
- Bryant, A. T. (1905). Zulu-English Dictionary. Pinetown, Natal: The Mariannhill Mission Press
- Bryant, A. T. (1909). Zulu medicine and medicine men. London. ISBN 9780908379446
- Bryant, A. T. (1917). An Abridged English-Zulu Word-book.
- Bryant, A. T. (1929). Olden Times in Zululand and Natal. Longmans, Green and Company. ISBN 9780598896391
- Bryant, A. T. (1949). The Zulu People Before the White Man Came. ISBN 9780837129334
