= Pongolapoort Dam =

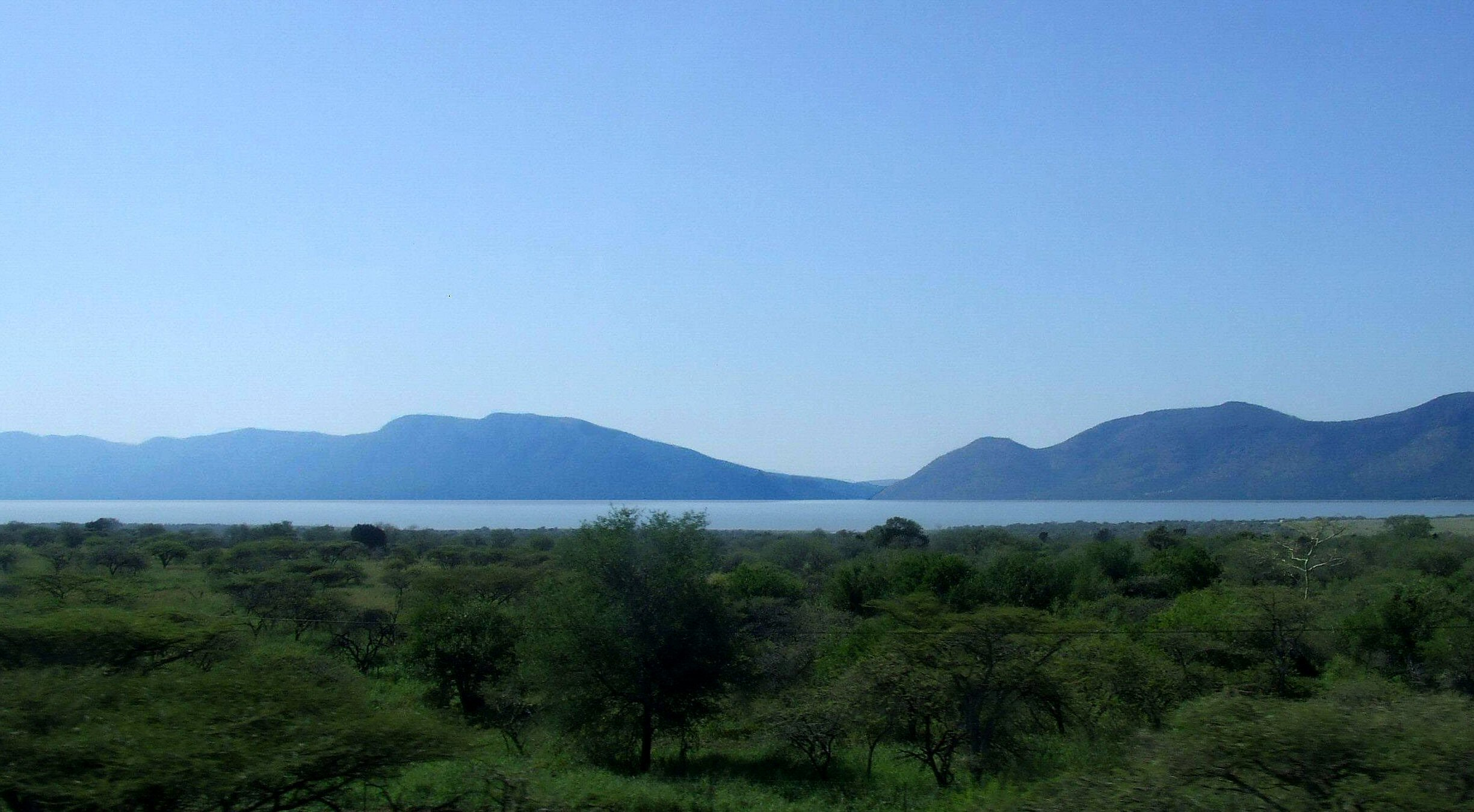

- Location within South Africa Location within KwaZulu-Natal
- Official name: Pongolapoort Dam
- Country: South Africa
- Location: Northern KwaZulu-Natal
- Coordinates: 27.4183°S 32.0714°E
- Purpose: Irrigation
- Opening date: 1973; 53 years ago
- Owner: Department of Water Affairs

Dam and spillways
- Type of dam: Arch dam
- Impounds: Phongolo River
- Height: 89 m (292 ft)
- Length: 451 m (1,480 ft)

Reservoir
- Creates: Pongolapoort Dam Reservoir
- Total capacity: 2 445 900 000 m^{3}
- Catchment area: 7814 km^{2}
- Surface area: 13 272.8 ha

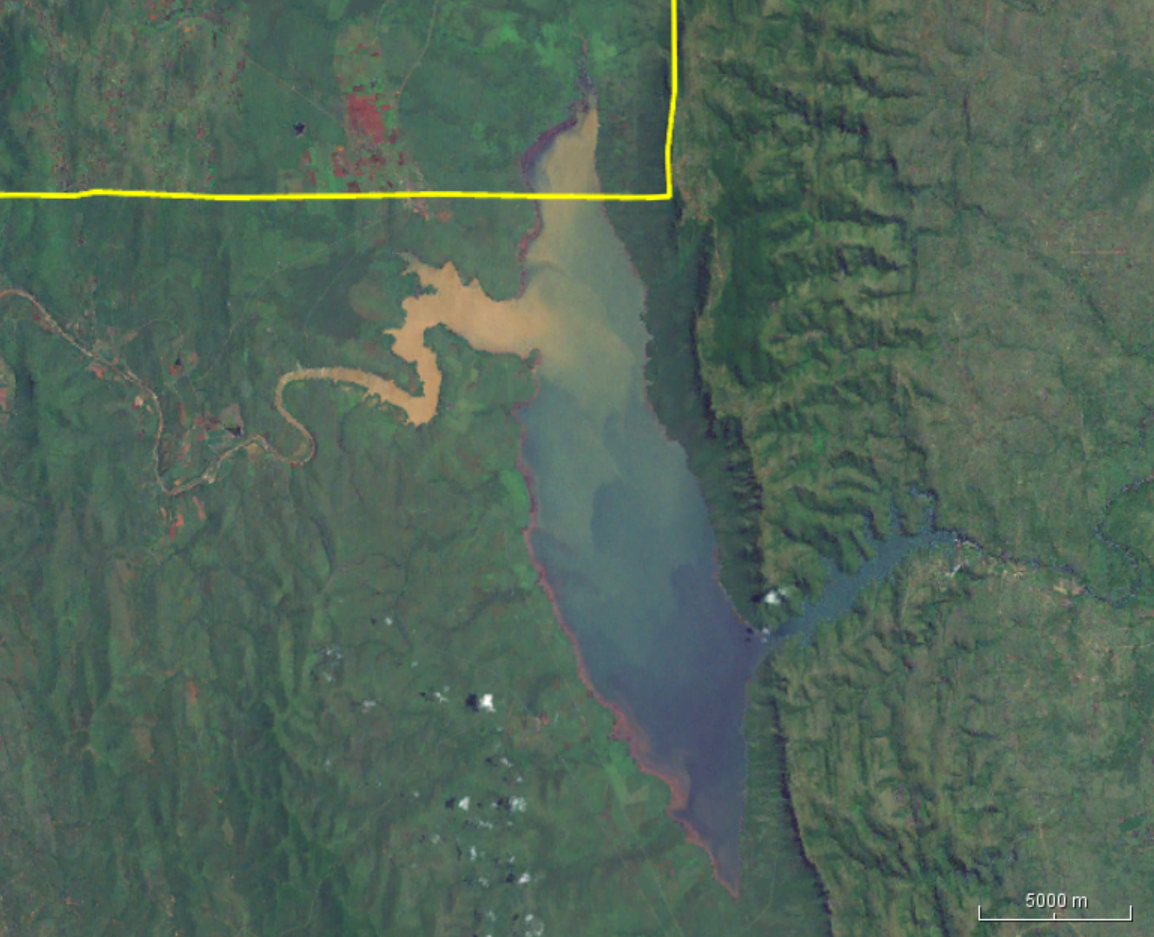
Satellite view of Pongolapoort Dam

Pongolapoort Dam, commonly referred to as Jozini Dam creating Lake Jozini, is an arch type dam (double-curvature single-arch) in northern KwaZulu-Natal, South Africa located on the Phongolo River. The dam is situated just north of the settlement of Jozini, 280 km north-east of the port city of Durban. The dam was constructed in 1973 at the eastern end of the narrow gorge separating the Lebombo and Ubombo ranges. The dam mainly serves irrigation needs and its hazard potential has been ranked high (3). The Phongolo River is the dam's outlet as well its largest and only perennial feeder.

== History ==
Prior to the construction of the Pongolapoort Dam, the land was Africa's first formally recognised conservation area. The Pongola Game Reserve was proclaimed in 1894 by the then President of the Transvaal Republic Paul Kruger. This would ultimately lead to the proclamation of the Hluhluwe-Imfolozi, Mkuze and Ndumo Game Reserves as well as one of Africa's greatest wildlife conservation parks, the Kruger National Park.

== Wildlife ==
The dam is flanked by private wildlife reserves as well as the Pongola Game Reserve which has many private lodges as well campsite for fishing. Wildlife and birdlife abound in the area. Mammals to be sought include elephant, leopard, white and black rhinoceros, buffalo, hippopotamus, waterbuck, bushbuck, nyala, greater kudu, zebra, giraffe and spotted hyaena.

The dam and its surrounds support over 350 bird species which includes rarities such as African broadbill, saddle-billed and yellow-billed storks, African finfoot, Pel's fishing owl and Narina trogon. The dam also supports a breeding colony of pink-backed and great white pelicans. Additionally the dam supports a stable population of Nile crocodiles.

The dam is also home to the southernmost population of tigerfish. Other fish species include catfish and kurper.

== Water quality ==
No information regarding the water quality of the dam but can be assumed to be fair. The Pongola Rivers major form of pollution is agricultural pesticides which make their way into the river due to the heavy use of land for agriculture above the dam.

== Houseboat fire ==
Ballito based company Shayamanzi Houseboats is running a luxury houseboat operation on Lake Jozini. On 9 October 2021 one of the boats, Shayamanzi I, caught fire and completely burnt after a faulty engine overheated. The four crew members and five German tourists dived into the rough water, where three people (two crew member and one tourist) died, they were confirmed dead, while other people were never found and confirmed dead. The cause of the fire and possible negligence is under investigation by South African Maritime Safety Authority (SAMSA).

== See also ==
- List of reservoirs and dams in South Africa
