= Embo-Dlamini =

Nguni-speaking community of southern Africa

Regions with significant populations
- Eswatini, South Africa

Languages
- Siswati

Religion
- Traditional African religion

Embo-Dlamini (also called Dlamini-Nguni, Tekela-Nguni or Emalangeni and sometimes Thonga-Nguni) refers to a historic Nguni-speaking community in the Maputaland-Lubombo region of Southern Africa that formed the modern Swazi people. It is a branch of the Embo-Nguni ethnic group that falls within the broader Embo identity.

== Context ==
According to Swazi oral tradition recorded by historians such as J.S.M. Matsebula and A.T. Bryant, Dlamini I was a son of Chief Langa, leader of an Embo-Nguni community that settled within the Tembe territories near Delagoa Bay. Dlamini I and Hlubi's followers later separated and migrated in different directions. Dlamini’s followers moved northward across the Lubombo Mountains and formed early Ngwane communities or the Embo-Dlamini, while Hlubi’s followers migrated southward along the Pongola River and became the ancestors of the amaHlubi.
