= List of monarchs of Eswatini =

This article lists the monarchs (Ngwenyamas) of Eswatini (known as Swaziland for most of its history).

The King of Eswatini (also known as Ingwenyama) rules alongside the Queen Mother of Eswatini (also known as Ndlovukati). The role of the king in Eswatini has historically been as the head or father of the nation while the Queen Mother is the spiritual leader of the nation.

== Ancient Kings / Chiefs of the Swazi people (pre–1745) ==
The following is a list of ancient Eswatini Kings/Chiefs.

- Mkhulunkosi
- Qomizitha
- Sukuta
- Madlasomo
- Ndlovu
- Mntungwa
- Ngwekati
- Kuwawa or Mawawa
- Sidvwabasilutfuli
- Gebase
- Kunene
- Nkabingwe
- Madlabane
- Hhili
- Dulunga
- Dondobola
- Sihuba
- Mlangeni
- Msimudze
- Mbhodlo or Mbhoholo
- Tembe
- Sikhulumaloyo
- Langa Samuketi
- Nkomo
- Khabako
- Nkosi I
- Ngwane I

=== Chiefs of Embo-Dlamini (16th and 17th century) ===
- Dlamini I (Matalatala)
- Mswati I
- Ngwane II
- Dlamini II
- Nkosi II
- Mavuso I
- Magudvulela
- Ludvonga I 1685–1715
- Dlamini III: 1720–1744

== Kings of Swaziland (1745–1903) ==
- Ngwane III: 1745–1780 (The first King of the modern Swazi unitary structure)
- LaYaka Ndwandwe (Queen Regent): 1780
- Ndvungunye (Zikodze, Mavuso II): 1780–1815
- Lomvula Mndzebele (Queen Regent): 1815
- Sobhuza I (Somhlolo, Ngwane IV; considered the first King of modern Swaziland): 1815–1836
- Lojiba Simelane (Queen Regent): 1836–1840
- Mswati II (Mavuso III): 1840–1868
- Tsandzile Ndwandwe (Queen Regent): 1868–1875
- Crown Prince Ludvonga II (Macaleni) – Never became King
- Mbandzeni (Dlamini IV): 1875–1889
- Tibati Nkambule (Queen Regent): 7 April 1889 – 1895
- Bhunu (Ngwane V, Mahlokohla): January 1895 – 10 December 1899
- Labotsibeni Mdluli (Queen Regent): 10 December 1899 – 1903
- Sobhuza II: 10 December 1899 – 1903

== Paramount Chiefs of the Swaziland Protectorate (1903–1968) ==
- Labotsibeni Mdluli (Queen Regent): 1903 – 22 December 1921
- Sobhuza II: 1903 – 2 September 1968 (assumed power on 22 December 1921)

== Kings of Swaziland / Eswatini (1968–present) ==
Name	Lifespan	Reign start	Reign end	Notes	Family	Image
Sobhuza II	22 July 1899 – 21 August 1982 (aged 83)	2 September 1968	21 August 1982† (13 years, 353 days)	Son of Ngwane V	House of Dlamini	Sobhuza II of Swaziland
Mswati III	19 April 1968 (age 58)	25 April 1986	Incumbent (40 years, 182 days)	Son of Sobhuza II	House of Dlamini	Mswati III of Swaziland/Eswatini

"Authorized Person" during the minority of King Mswati III

- Prince Sozisa Dlamini: 21 August 1982 – 1 November 1985 (suspended from July 1984)

Regents during the minority of King Mswati III

- Queen Dzeliwe: 21 August 1982 – 10 August 1983
- Queen Ntfombi: 10 August 1983 – 25 April 1986

== Royal Standard ==
Royal Standard of Mswati III.

== See also ==
- Politics of Eswatini
- History of Eswatini
- Succession to the Swazi throne
- List of prime ministers of Eswatini
