= Swaziland Oral History Project =

Eswatini oral history archival project established in 1985

- Abbreviation: SOHP
- Formation: 1985
- Type: Archival oral-history research project
- Headquarters: Eswatini National Archives in Lobamba, Eswatini, University of the Witwatersrand in Johannesburg, South Africa
- Region served: Swaziland ( now Eswatini)
- Official language: English; Siswati
- Lead Researcher: Philip Bonner, Carolyn Hamilton (historian)

The Swaziland Oral History Project (SOHP) is a research and archival initiative established in 1985 at the National Archives in Lobamba, Eswatini. It was established to collect, preserve, transcribe and translate oral histories, clan genealogies and testimonies of Swazi elders, with particular attention to the precolonial history of the Swazi kingdom. It was developed through cooperation between Swazi archivists and elders and professional historians, notably Carolyn Hamilton and Philip Bonner.

The SOHP materials were also transferred to the Historical Papers Research Archive at the University of the Witwatersrand in South Africa where Bonner was head. Swazi archivists and researchers, including Isaac Dlamini and Dumisa Dlamini, played a central role in the fieldwork and collection of testimonies and the establishment of the SOHP.

== Background ==
The history of Swaziland stretches back thousands of years, but it was only in the mid-1800s, with the arrival of Europeans, that events began to be recorded in writing.

Little is known about the earlier periods because written evidence is scarce, however, historians have uncovered a wealth of information about these earlier times by drawing on other forms of evidence, particularly oral traditions and physical artifacts. The SOHP was established to systematically collect, transcribe, translate and archive oral testimonies from elders.
