= J.S.M. Matsebula =

Swazi historian (1918 -1993)

J. S. M. Matsebula
- Born: James Shadrack Mkhulunyelwa Matsebula; 1918; Near Mbabane, Swaziland
- Died: 1993 (aged 74–75)
- Occupation: Historian
- Known for: History of Swaziland; development of Siswati orthography
- Notable work: Izakhiwo zamaSwazi (1952); A History of Swaziland (1972); J.S.M. Matsebula Collection (1989)

James Shadrack Mkhulunyelwa Matsebula (1918 - 1993) was a Swazi linguist, writer and historian best known for the A History of Swaziland editions. He worked as King Sobhuza II's private secretary.

Matsebula served for many years as a close adviser, private secretary and chief counsellor to King Sobhuza II.

He authored several editions of A History of Swaziland, which became one of the most widely used historical works on the Kingdom of Eswatini, and helped establish orthography for Siswati literature. In 1952, Matsebula published Izakhiwo zamaSwazi ("The Origins of the Swazi"), an early historical work examining Swazi origins and social structures.

He was a great-grandson of Gcina Matsebula, the first headman of Embhuleni royal village.

In 1989, Matsebula donated a substantial collection of work to the library of the University of Eswatini, termed the J.S.M. Matsebula Collection, which includes Matsebula’s papers and manuscripts as well as official correspondence from the mid-19th century.

== Works ==
- Matsebula, J.S.M. (1952). Izakhiwo ZamaSwazi. Afrikaanse Pers-Boekhandel
- Matsebula, J.S.M. (1972). A History of Swaziland. 1st edition. Longman Penguin Southern Africa: Cape Town. ISBN 9780582603240
- Matsebula, J.S.M. (1976). A History of Swaziland. 2rd edition. Longman Penguin Southern Africa: Cape Town.
- Matsebula, J.S.M. (1988). A History of Swaziland. 3rd edition. Longman Penguin Southern Africa: Cape Town. ISBN 9780582031678
- J.S.M. Matsebula Collection (1989)
