= Embo (Nguni ancestry) =

Nguni ancestral group

AbaMbo / AmaMbo / eMbo

Regions with significant populations
- Southeastern Africa

Languages
- Proto- Nguni (ancestral)

Related ethnic groups
- Nguni people, Swazi, Hlubi, Thembu, Mpondo

Embo (also AbaMbo, Abambu, Bapo, Mbo, Mbos, AmaMbo, Abasembu, Amabambo or eMbo) refers to an ancestral grouping and historical ethnic identity of early Nguni-speaking peoples who settled in Southern Africa during the Bantu expansion.

== Background ==
Early European accounts from the 17th and 18th centuries refer to peoples identified as the Abambo along the southeastern coast of Southern Africa.

In historical literature, the term Embo also refers to narrower Nguni groupings, such as the Embo-Nguni and sub-groups such as the Embo-Dlamini, which formed the modern Swazi people. The group was active in the Maputaland-Lubombo region from the early modern period.

They were distinguished by their cattle-based economy, crop farming and coastal trade. Historically, the Bantu-speaking people of the southern part of Africa came from the Katanga direction and continued to expand to the south along the east coast of Africa.
