= Embo-Nguni =

Nguni-speaking community of southern Africa

Regions with significant populations
- Mozambique, Eswatini, South Africa

Languages
- Nguni languages

Religion
- Traditional African religion, Christianity

Embo-Nguni is a historiographical term used to describe a cluster within the broader Embo identity of historic Nguni-speaking communities that migrated to the Maputo-Lubombo region of coastal Southern Africa during the Bantu expansion.

== Origin and early migration ==
Historically, the Bantu-speaking people of the southern part of Africa came from the Katanga direction and continued to expand to the south along the east coast of Africa.

The Embo-Nguni split into various subgroups such as the Embo-Dlamini under Dlamini I, the Hlubi under Mthimkhulu I, and the AmaNgwane under Hlongwane that migrated to present-day KwaZulu Natal and other groups that moved further south into what is now the Eastern Cape, including communities that later became part of the AmaMpondo, AmaMpondomise, and AmaBomvana, in the Xhosa-speaking region.

Further Embo-Nguni splits were formed in the movement across the Pongola River, some settling between the Pongola River and Mfolozi River and becoming known as the Ndwandwe, BakaNgwane ("people of Ngwane") and the Hlubi people.
