= Maputaland-Lubombo region =

Precolonial region in southern Africa

- Geographic region
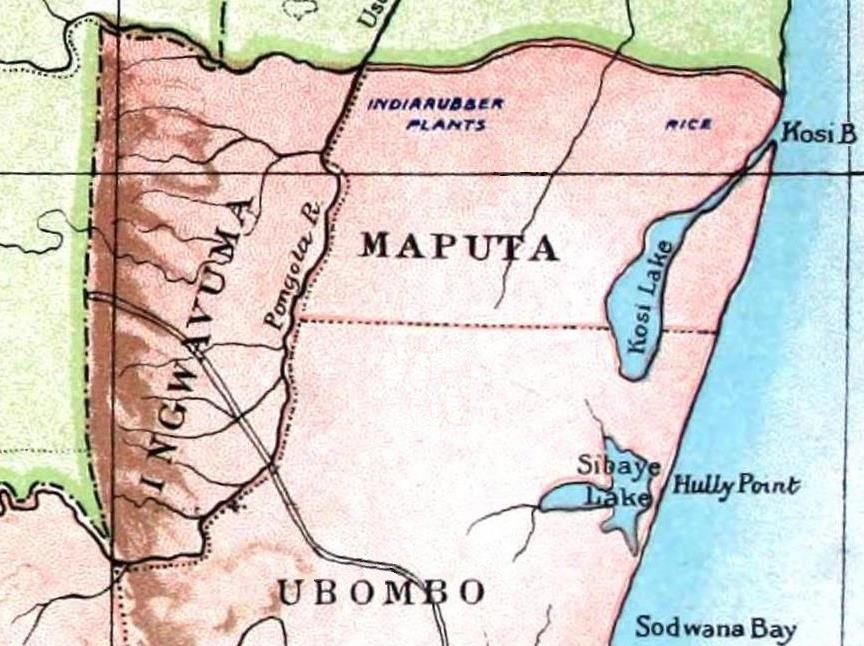
- Countries: South Africa, Eswatini, Mozambique

Maputaland-Lubombo region is a geographic area in Southern Africa that spans parts of South Africa, Eswatini and Mozambique. It includes the low-lying coastal plains of Maputaland in northeastern KwaZulu-Natal, South Africa and the eastern highlands of the Lubombo Mountains along the border with Eswatini. The region has historically been inhabited by diverse Embo communities, including Nguni-speaking peoples and coastal groups such as the Tembe and Nyaka. Historically, it was inhabited by communities belonging to the Embo ancestral grouping, including early Embo-Nguni settlers and later branches such as the Tsonga-Nguni, Tembe-Thonga and Embo-Dlamini.
