= Pongola River =

Pongola River uPhongolo
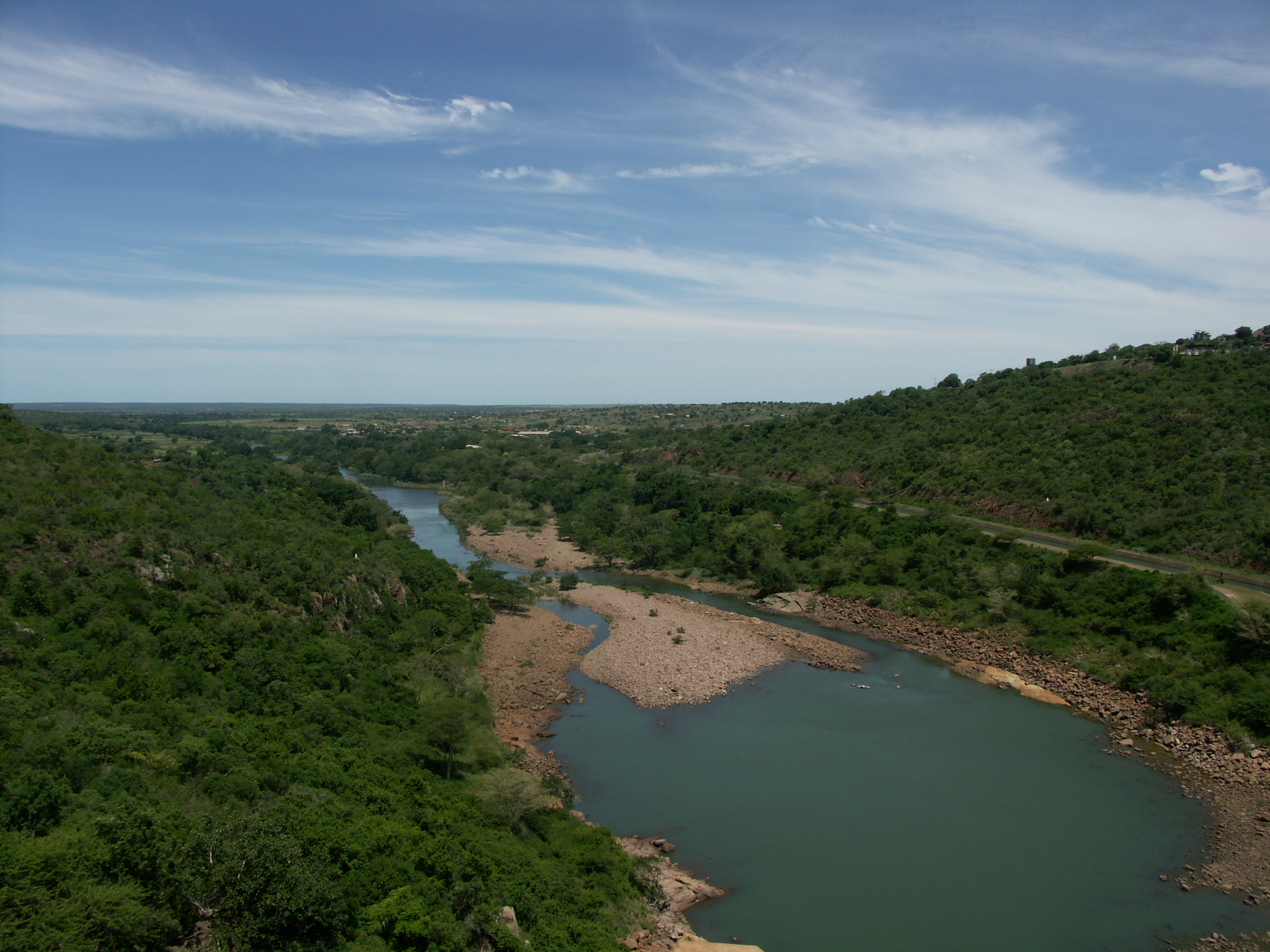
- Pongola river, immediately below Pongolapoort Dam

- Location of the Pongola River mouth
- Etymology: From the Zulu for 'trough-like', 'river of troughs', referring to long pools.

Location
- Country: South Africa, Mozambique

Physical characteristics
- Source
  - location: Near Utrecht, South Africa
- Mouth: Maputo River
  - location: Maputo Province, Mozambique
  - coordinates: 26°51′21″S 32°20′47″E
  - elevation: 29 m (95 ft)

The Pongola River is a river in South Africa. It is a tributary of the Maputo River. It rises near Utrecht in northern KwaZulu-Natal, flows east through oPhongolo, is dammed at Pongolapoort, and crosses the Ubombo Mountains; then it flows north towards Mozambique, joining the Maputo River.

Its main tributaries are the Bivane River and the Mozana River in South Africa, as well as the Ngwavuma in Eswatini.

The name of the uPhongolo River is derived from the isiZulu word for a barrel, vat, trough, or cask, referring to the deep and sometimes long pools that are found in this river.

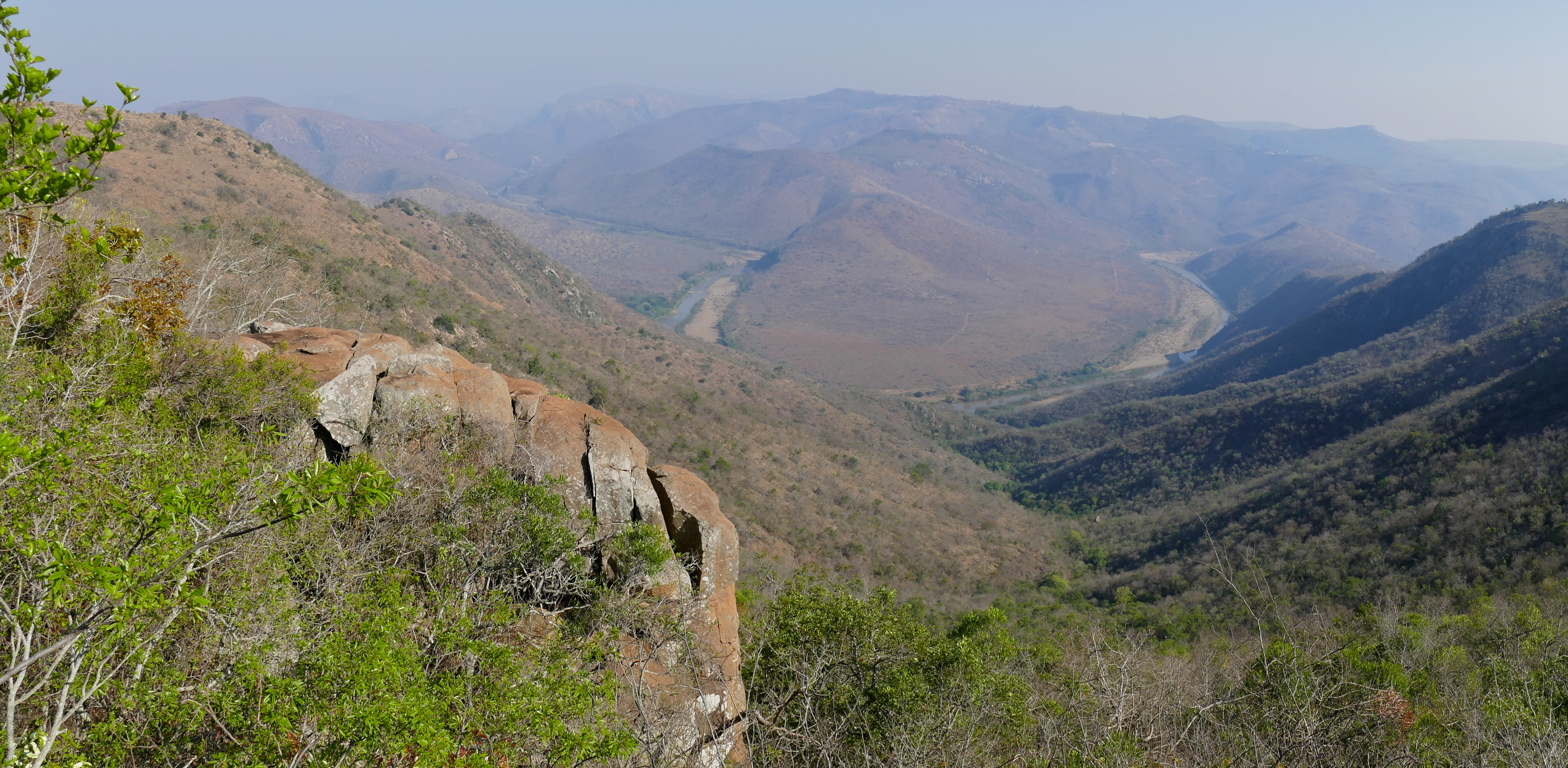
The Pongolo River winding through hills in and beyond the Ithala Game Reserve

== See also ==
- 1305 Pongola
- Pongolapoort Dam
- List of rivers of South Africa
