= Lebombo Mountains =

Mountain range in Africa

- (Lubombo / Libombo)
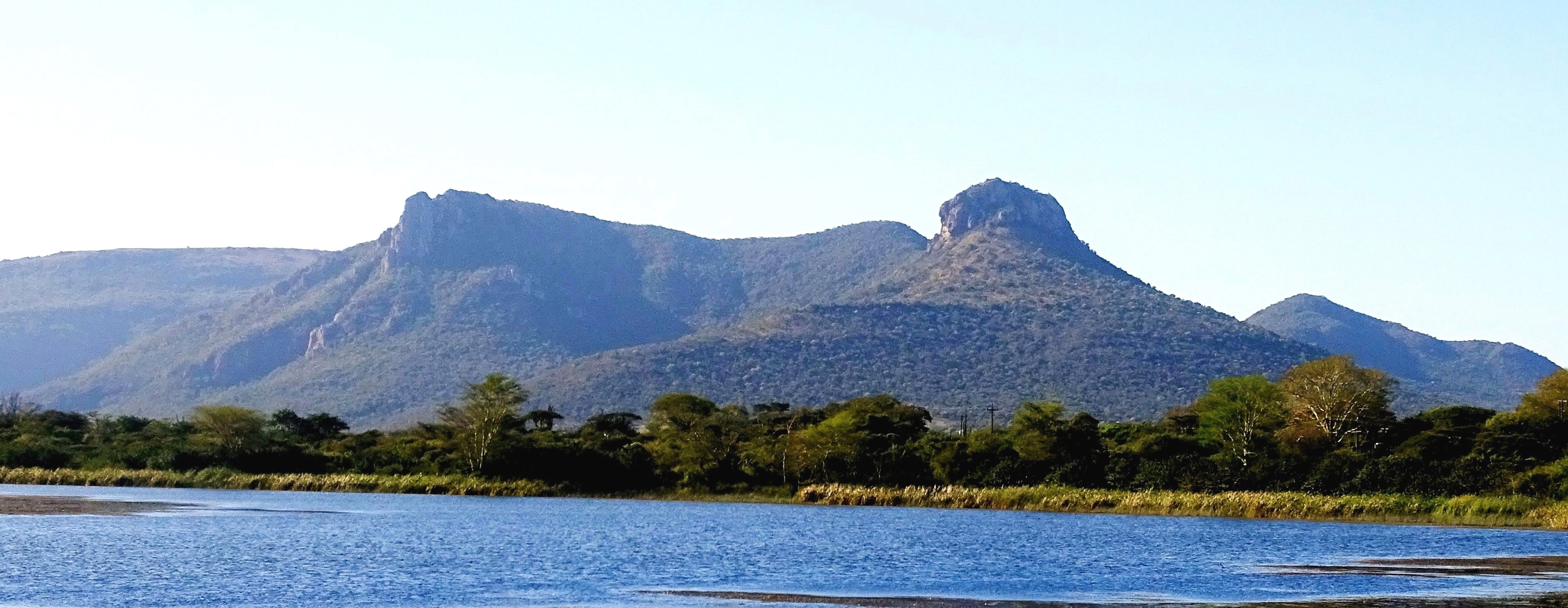
- A southerly part of the Lebombo mountain chain, including Ghost Mountain; seen from Mkuze

Highest point
- Peak: Mount Mananga
- Elevation: 776 m (2,546 ft)
- Listing: List of mountain ranges of South Africa
- Coordinates: 26°15′0″S 32°0′0″E

Dimensions
- Length: 800 km (500 mi) N/S
- Width: 100 km (62 mi) E/W

Geography
- Location within South Africa
- Countries: Mozambique; South Africa; Eswatini

Geology
- Orogeny: Gondwanian
- Rock age: Precambrian
- Rock types: Rhyolite; basalt

The Lebombo Mountains, also called Lubombo Mountains, Rivombo Mountains (Portuguese: Montes Libombos), are an 800 km-long (500 mi), narrow range of mountains in Southern Africa. They stretch from Hluhluwe in KwaZulu-Natal in the south to Punda Maria in the Limpopo Province in South Africa in the north. Parts of the mountain range are also found in Mozambique and Eswatini.

== Description ==
Geologically, the range is considered a monocline; part of a rifted volcanic margin. The Lebombo monocline was aligned with the Explora Escarpment off-shore Dronning Maud Land, Antarctica, before the break-up of Gondwana. The Lebombo monocline strikes N-S and dips to the east. It is composed of a sequence of Jurassic age volcanic rock, both basaltic lavas and rhyolitic flows and tuffs. The sequence rests on essentially horizontal Karoo Supergroup sedimentary rocks of the Kalahari Craton to the west and is overlain by Cretaceous to recent sediments to the east. The alternating resistant rhyolite and easily eroded basalts produce a series of parallel sharp cuesta ridges separated by savanna plains.

The range is relatively low with heights between 400 m (1,300 ft) and less than 800 m (2,600 ft). The highest peak is the 776 m-high (2,546 ft) Mount Mananga. The 480 m-high (1,570 ft) Longwe is the highest point in the Lebombo Range north of the Letaba River.

The mountains dominate Lubombo District in Eswatini. Towns in the area include Siteki in the centre, Lubhuku in the west and Mayaluka and Big Bend in the south with the Lusutfu River running past the southern region of the mountain range. At the north lie the towns of Simunye, Tambankulu and Namaacha, and the Mlawula Nature Reserve as well as the Mbuluzi River.

A number of rivers, including the Pongola, Mkuze, and Lusutfu, cross the mountains from west to east. The Lebombo Mountains are home to the Thonga people who are part of the Tsonga ethnic group, it straddles from North KwaZulu-Natal (Amathongaland) to Kruger National Park in Limpopo Province with the same name origin of the Lebombo/Rivombo clan.

== Protected areas ==
Kruger National Park and Phongolo Nature Reserve protect part of the range.

== See also ==
- Explora Escarpment – an escarpment off the coast of Antarctica which was aligned with the mountains before the breakup of Gondwana
- Lebombo bone
