= Makhuza-Tembe branch =

Inland royal house of the Tembe Kingdom in Maputaland, South Africa

- Royal House of the Tembe Kingdom (Inland line)
- Reign: late 1800s – immediately dissolved by Portuguese colonial rule
- Predecessor: Tembe Kingdom
- Successor: Tembe Tribal Authority

The Makhuza-Tembe branch was the inland royal lineage of the historic Tembe Kingdom, based in the northern KwaZulu-Natal region of Maputaland. It traces its origins to Prince Makhuza Tembe, the son of Prince Madingi Tembe (one of King Mwayi Tembe's sons). The branch was established in the late 19th century as a result of a succession dispute against the coastal Ngwanase-Tembe branch, led by the heir Prince Ngwanase Tembe.

The Makhuza lineage today is incorporated into the Tembe Tribal Authority. Makhuza, before Portuguese colonial authorities overturned his claim to Tembe power and recognised Prince Ngwanase as legitimate Chief of Tembe, he ruled inland Tembe communities (not coastal Tembe capital), power he inherited from Prince Madingi, his father.

Following the death of King Noziyingile Tembe, Ngwanase's father, in 1886, Makhuza refused to recognise Ngwanase or the regency of Ngwanase's mother Queen Zambili Dlamini, opting instead to establish the parallel Makhuza Tembe branch.

Portuguese colonial authorities overturned his claim and recognised Prince Ngwanase as the legitimate Chief of Tembe.
