= Tembe (ruler) =

Early ancestral ruler of the Tembe Kingdom

- Founder of the Tembe polity
- Reign: c. late 15th - mid 16th century
- Predecessor: Mwali I (traditional genealogy)
- Successor: Tembe lineage
- Dynasty: Tembe
- Religion: African traditional religion

Tembe was a precolonial ruler and ancestral founder figure in Tembe tradition, from whom the Tembe royal lineage and polity of southeastern Africa derive their name. He is generally regarded as having consolidated Tembe authority in the lower Nkomati River and Delagoa Bay region by the mid-16th century, shortly before the first recorded Portuguese encounters in 1554.

== Origin and early settlement ==
The origins of Tembe are preserved primarily through oral traditions shared among Rhonga-speaking Tsonga groups (Tembe-Thonga), to which the Tembe belong.

These traditions trace Tembe ancestry to mytho-historical figures associated with early human origins, most notably Likalahumba and Nsilambowa.

According to multiple accounts, Likalahumba is regarded as the senior figure and Nsilambowa as the junior, representing either successive ancestors or symbolic first human beings within Rhonga cosmology. The name Likalahumba later appears in Tembe genealogies in modified forms such as Ludahumba or Dhlahumbaaa.

Some traditions identify Mwali I as a son of Nsilambowa, with Tembe appearing as a descendant of Mwali I, making him approximately the fourth-generation leader following the lineage’s departure from the Mapungubwe region.

Tembe oral traditions situate the early movement of the lineage from the Mapungubwe area southward through Pafuri into the lower Limpopo Valley, before settling in the Nkomati River region by the late 15th century.

A well-known Tembe legend recounts their arrival in the Nkomati valley “on a floating island of papyrus”. Another traditional saying associated with this migration states: “Phandje phandje ra nala – Tembe kulu a wela”, meaning “little by little across the river, the great Tembe crossed”.

By the time Portuguese traders encountered Tembe communities near Delagoa Bay in 1554, the Tembe had likely occupied the Nkomati region for several decades. Tembe is therefore regarded as the figure who consolidated chiefly authority in the area, laying the foundations for what later became known as the Tembe kingdom.

His descendants controlled both coastal and inland territories, which included Kosi Bay and the region around Manguzi, while inland authority extended towards the lower reaches of the Lubombo Mountains. This allowed the Tembe to interact with neighbouring Nguni and Tsonga communities and managed to navigate through the storms of expansionist battles, like interaction with the Swazi, Ndwandwe, Mthethwa and later Zulu Kingdoms.

At its peak in the 18th century under King Mangobe Tembe and his son King Mabudu Tembe, the Tembe Kingdom accumulated a lot of wealth through Indian Ocean coast trade with European merchants. Tembe chiefs exchanged ivory and other local goods for valuable items such as glass beads, cloth and firearms. The Tembe Kingdom today is represented through the Tembe Tribal Authority.

Some scholars trace the early presence of Tembe-related communities in the Maputaland-Lubombo region as far back as the 13th century.
