= Ngwanase-Tembe branch =

Coastal royal house of the Tembe Kingdom in Maputaland, South Africa

Ngwanase-Tembe Branch
- Royal House of the Tembe Kingdom (Coastaline KwaZulu Natal, South Africa)
- Reign: c. 1894 – present
- Predecessor: Tembe Kingdom
- Successor: Incumbent

The Ngwanase-Tembe branch is the coastal royal lineage of the historic Tembe Kingdom, based in the northern KwaZulu-Natal region of Maputaland. It traces its origins to Prince Ngwanase Tembe, the son of King Noziyingile Tembe and Queen Regent Zambili Dlamini. The branch emerged in the late 19th century following internal political struggles and a succession dispute within the wider Tembe-Thonga royal house, which gave birth to the Ngwanase's rival and parallel power, the Makhuza-Tembe branch established by Ngwanase's nephew, Prince Makhuza Tembe.

The Ngwanase lineage continues today as the chiefly house associated with the area known as KwaNgwanase, Manguzi, representing the coastal Tembe communities through the Tembe Tribal Authority.

The origins of the Ngwanase-Tembe branch are rooted in the succession crisis that followed the death of King Noziyingile Tembe in the late 1800s when, Prince Makhuza Tembe contested the legitimacy of Prince Ngwanase to take over as leader of the Tembe Kingdom, forming the Makhuza-Tembe branch. Both structures are today incorporated into the modern Tembe Tribal Authority. The Portuguese colonial authorities overturned Makhuza's claim to power and recognised Prince Ngwanase as the legitimate Chief of Tembe.
