= Chief of Tembe =

Traditional leadership title in the Tembe Kingdom

- Inkosi (Chief) yaKwaTembe
- Incumbent; Inkosi (Chief) Mabhudu Israel Tembe
- Residence: KwaNgwanase, KwaZulu Natal, South Africa
- Seat: KwaNgwanase, Manguzi
- Appointer: Tembe Tribal Authority
- Term length: Hereditary
- Formation: Precolonial era
- First holder: Tembe

Chief of Tembe (also Inkosi yaKwaTembe) is the hereditary leadership title of the ruling house of the precolonial Tembe Kingdom, now represented as the Tembe Tribal Authority in South Africa's modern democratic structure. The Chief of Tembe oversees traditional governance within the Tembe Tribal Authority, manages land allocation, presides over customary courts and represents the Tembe community in provincial traditional leadership structures.

The Tembe chieftaincy is historically linked with the wider Embo-Nguni, Embo-Dlamini ( Emalangeni of Dlamini I and the Thonga-Nguni (ancestors of the Tembe-Thonga) of the Maputaland-Lubombo region as well as other communities like the Nyaka.

Various historical traditions identify figures such as Sikuke, Ludahumba, Silamboya and Mangobe as founding ancestors of the Tembe family.

== List of Tembe rulers ==
The following is a verified list of Tembe rulers from King Sikuke to current Chief of Tembe.

| Name | Reign | Notes |
|---|---|---|
| King Sikuke | c.1692-1710 | First verifiable Tembe ruler after the genealogical gap |
| King Ludahumba | 1710-1728 | Successor to King Sikuke |
| King Silamboya | 1728-1746 | Consolidated Tembe authority during early coastal-inland interactions |
| King Mangobe | 1746-1764 | Predecessor to King Mabudu; pivotal ruler before the rise of the Mabudu-Tembe branch |
| King Mabudu | 1764-1782 | Founder of the Mabudu-Tembe branch; powerful 18th-century ruler |
| King Mwayi | 1782-1800 | Successor to Mabudu |
| King Makasana | 1800-1854 | Major ruler during early 19th-century upheavals; father of King Noziyingile |
| King Noziyingile Tembe | 1854-1886 | Father of Prince Ngwanase; strengthened Tembe polity during colonial encroachment |
| Queen Zambili Dlamini (Regent) | 1886-1894 | Regent for Prince Ngwanase following Noziyingile’s death |
| Chief Ngwanase Tembe | 1894-1928 | Installed after regency; founder of the modern Ngwanase-Tembe branch |
| Chief Mhlupeki Tembe | 1928-1950 | Son of Ngwanase; ruled through early apartheid years |
| Chief Mzimba Tembe | 1951-2000 | Son of Mhlupeki; long-serving 20th-century chief |
| Chief Israel Mabhudu Tembe | 2001-present | Current Chief of Tembe, leading the Tembe Tribal Authority |

== See also ==
- Tembe Kingdom
- Tembe Tribal Authority
- Mabudu-Tembe Kingdom
- Tembe (Southern African clan)
- Tembe Elephant Park
- KwaNgwanase
- Prince Ngwanase Tembe
- Queen Zambili Dlamini
- King Noziyingile Tembe
- Prince Makhuza Tembe
