= Makhuza Tembe =

19th-century prince of the Tembe kingdom

- Senior Prince of the Tembe Kingdom (Founder of the Makhuza-Tembe branch)
- Reign: late 1800s – early 1900s
- Predecessor: King Noziyingile Tembe
- Successor: Leadership of the Makhuza branch
- Born: Tembe Kingdom, Maputaland
- Died: 1924; Inland Tembe territory, Maputaland
- Dynasty: Tembe-Thonga
- Father: Prince Madingi Tembe
- Religion: African Traditional Religion

Makhuza Tembe (died 1924) was a late 19th-century Tembe prince who founded the Makhuza-Tembe branch of the Tembe Kingdom following a succession dispute against Queen Regent Zambili Dlamini and her son, Prince Ngwanase Tembe. Historically, the Makhuza-Tembe branch governed inland Tembe territories independently.

== Background ==
Prince Makhuza Tembe was a senior figure of the inland Tembe royal house during the late nineteenth century. He descended from the older Tembe inland line, which originated when Prince Madingi Tembe, son of King Mwayi Tembe and grandson of King Mabudu Tembe, was placed over the interior Tembe territories during the early nineteenth century. This line remained politically influential and often asserted autonomy from the main coastal Tembe leadership of King Makasana Tembe, Prince Madingi's brother. Later the coastal Tembe was ruled by the descendants of King Noziyingile Tembe, whose son Prince Ngwanase Tembe became heir after a period of internal conflict. This coastal lineage formed a separate but related branch of Tembe authority, centred around Maputaland and later KwaNgwanase (Manguzi).

This is after the kingdom managed to navigate pressures from the Zulu Kingdom, Swaziland (Eswatini) and the expanding colonial presence along the Maputaland coast.

After Madingi’s death, his son Makhuza Tembe inherited leadership of the inland Tembe territories and refused to recognise the authority of the coastal heir, Prince Ngwanase Tembe as the legitimate Chief of Tembe or the regency of his mother, Queen Zambili Dlamini, and instead maintained the independence of the inland chiefly house, creating what became known as the Makhuza-Tembe branch until the Portuguese colonial authorities intervened and officially recognised Ngwanase.
