= Tembe (Southern African clan) =

Southern African clan

Total population
- Part of the broader Tembe-Thonga community

Regions with significant populations
- Northern KwaZulu Natal (KwaNgwanase), South Africa; Southern Mozambique

Languages
- Swazi, Nguni dialects

Religion
- Traditional African religion; Christianity

Related ethnic groups
- Tsonga people, Swazi people (Nguni peoples)

The Tembe are a historically important Southern African clan whose traditional territory spans the northern coastal region of KwaZulu-Natal in South Africa and southern Mozambique, historically known as Maputaland, the defined Maputaland-Lubombo region. The Tembe belong to the broader Tembe-Thonga people, a Nguni-speaking group and are distinguished by a chiefly lineage that has been documented for over three centuries across the southeastern coastal region of Southern Africa. Their legacy is preserved today through the Tembe Tribal Authority in Manguzi (KwaNgwanase), a settlement south of the Mozambique–South Africa border.

The Tembe royal lineage traces its ancestry to early rulers, like Chief Tembe, of the Tembe Kingdom who was first recorded in 1554 by Portuguese and whose Kingdom later expanded by his descendants and extended from Delagoa Bay (present-day Maputo Bay) southwards to the area of Lake St. Lucia. The clan's settlement in Maputaland-Lubombo region predates colonial boundary formation and involves interactions with neighbouring Nguni and Tsonga groups. During this period, the Tembe maintained a chiefly authority that governed coastal and inland territories, including Kosi Bay, Manguzi, and the lower reaches of the Lubombo Mountains, and amassing a lot of wealth during the Kingdom's peak in the 18th century through Indian Ocean ivory trade with Europeans.

== Ethnographic classification ==
Early ethnographers such as A. T. Bryant classified the Tembe as part of the "Tonga-Nguni" grouping, and he referred to them specifically as "Tembe-Tongas" on the basis of linguistic and cultural similarities with the peoples north of Maputaland. Henri-Alexandre Junod similarly placed the Tembe within the broader Thonga/Tsonga category, arguing that their social practices closely resembled those of northern communities.

Most twentieth-century historians and anthropologists accepted this classification without substantial re-examination. In a 1987 report, De Bruin described the Tembe as belonging to the Tsonga tribe, noting that this group historically inhabited four distinct regions of Southern Africa. Likewise, in 1983, ethnologist Dr. J.J. van Wyk identified the Tembe as part of the Tsonga grouping, although he acknowledged their long-standing political and cultural ties with the Swazi Kingdom.

Oral traditions recorded in Maputaland emphasise a close historical connection between the Tembe, the Tsonga, and the Swazi. One widely circulated account relates that the ancestor of the Tsonga had twin sons: one was marked with a facial scar and called Swazi (likely Mswati I), while the unscarred twin became the ancestor of the Tsonga. This narrative is invoked to explain the shared origin of the Tembe, Swazi and Tsonga peoples.

The Swazi monarchy also maintains that Ngwane, the founder of the AmaNgwane kingdom (now Kingdom of Eswatini, migrated from Maputaland across the Lubombo Mountains, while his brother, Tembe, remained behind as ruler of Maputaland. This claim resurfaced politically during the 1980s when the Kingdom of Eswatini asserted historical rights over the Ingwavuma district. The proposed transfer was eventually rejected, and the area remains part of South Africa, although both Swazi and Zulu traditional authorities continue to reference their historical connections to the region.

In 1902, an informant of James Stuart described the word Tsonga as an isicilo - an embarrassing or derogatory appellation- and stated that the correct name for the group was AbakwaMabudu, meaning “the people of King Mabudu Tembe.”

African societies or "tribes" were anthropologically defined by territory, hereditary leadership, language and their systems of relative autonomy and economy.

== History and origins ==
According to local oral tradition, one version claims that the word "Tsonga" or "Thonga" is of Arabian origin. Early Arabian traders reportedly called the people of southeastern Africa "Thonga," meaning "hunter," in reference to their renowned hunting skills, which facilitated trade with the Arabian merchants. However, apart from oral accounts, no corroborating evidence supports this etymology.

The Tembe claim to have migrated from Kalanga (Karanga) in present-day Zimbabwe to the area surrounding Delagoa Bay.

Recent archaeological research and studies of oral traditions suggest that the historically known African societies of the Kingdom of Tembe did not migrate in fixed ethnic units, but emerged locally from long-established ancestral communities of diverse origins and cultures.

The Tembe derive their name from Chief Tembe, the founder of their clan. Bryant notes that it is uncertain to which clan Tembe originally belonged, but based on linguistic evidence, Tembe's ancestors were likely related to the Ndau (from Sofala, Mozambique), the Karanga (from Zimbabwe), and local communities from Nyassaland.

According to oral tradition, the Mabudu and the Ndau share a strong ancestral link. Before the people of Maputaland were called Thonga or Mabudu, they were known as 'abaNdau' ("people of Ndau), an appellation connecting them to Sofala Province in Mozambique. Recent research in KwaNgwanase indicates that local diviners claim possession by Ndau spirits, asserting them as lineage ancestors.

Henri-Alexandre Junod documented a tradition that the Tembe migrated southwards from Karanga to Mozambique, greeting each other with "Nkalanga" (meaning "man from the north" or "of Kalanga country"). He also recounts a legend that the Tembe migrated along a papyrus island crossing the Nkomati and Tembe rivers before settling south of Delagoa Bay.

By the mid-16th century, the Tembe were established around Delagoa Bay. A ruler named Tembe was recorded by a Portuguese chronicler and he said Tembe lived near Lourenço Marques in 1554, whom Bryant identifies as the ancestor of the Tembe clan.

Following the death of King Silamboya in 1746, the Tembe royal house divided into two competing branches. The senior branch, descending from Silamboya’s eldest son Prince Mwali, settled between the Umbeluzi and Maputo rivers. The junior branch, descended from Silamboya’s younger son King Mangobe Tembe, occupied territories between the Maputo River and the Indian Ocean.

Although junior by birth, the Mangobe line later emerged as the dominant ruling house, producing successive Tembe chiefs like Mabudu Tembe.

Various historical traditions identify figures such as Sikuke, Ludahumba, Silamboya and Mangobe as founding ancestors of the Tembe family.

== List of Tembe rulers ==
The following is a verified list of Tembe rulers from King Sikuke to current Chief of Tembe.

Name	Reign	Notes
King Sikuke	c.1692-1710	First verifiable Tembe ruler after the genealogical gap
King Ludahumba	1710-1728	Successor to King Sikuke
King Silamboya	1728-1746	Consolidated Tembe authority during early coastal-inland interactions
King Mangobe	1746-1764	Predecessor to King Mabudu; pivotal ruler before the rise of the Mabudu-Tembe branch
King Mabudu	1764-1782	Founder of the Mabudu-Tembe branch; powerful 18th-century ruler
King Mwayi	1782-1800	Successor to Mabudu
King Makasana	1800-1854	Major ruler during early 19th-century upheavals; father of King Noziyingile
King Noziyingile Tembe	1854-1886	Father of Prince Ngwanase; strengthened Tembe polity during colonial encroachment
Queen Zambili Dlamini (Regent)	1886-1894	Regent for Prince Ngwanase following King Noziyingile’s death
Chief Ngwanase Tembe	1894-1928	Installed after regency; founder of the modern Ngwanase-Tembe branch
Chief Mhlupeki Tembe	1928-1950	Son of Ngwanase; ruled through early apartheid years
Chief Mzimba Tembe	1951-2000	Son of Mhlupeki; long-serving 20th-century chief
Chief Mabhudu Israel Tembe	2001–present	Current Chief of Tembe, currently leading the Tembe Tribal Authority
