= Ngwanase Tembe =

Chief of Tembe (reign.1894-1928)

- Inkosi (Chief) of the Tembe
- Reign: 1894–1928
- Predecessor: King Noziyingile Tembe
- Successor: Tembe Tribal Authority
- Died: 1928; Maputaland, KwaZulu Natal, South Africa
- House: Tembe Tribal Authority
- Father: King Noziyingile Tembe
- Mother: Queen Zambili Dlamini (Swazi princess)

Prince Ngwanase Tembe (died 1928) was a Chief of Tembe and ruler within the historic Tembe Kingdom on the north-eastern coast of present-day KwaZulu-Natal, South Africa and southern Mozambique. He governed the Tembe people from 1894 until his death in 1928. Ngwanase was the son of King Noziyingile Tembe and Queen Zambili Dlamini of the Kingdom of Eswatini. He is widely regarded as the founder of the dominant Ngwanase-Tembe branch of the Tembe royal line, a lineage that emerged following a succession dispute with Prince Makhuza Tembe (son of his father's brother Prince Madingi Tembe), who established the parallel Makhuza-Tembe branch of the chieftaincy.

Ngwanase's family belonged to the broader Tembe-Thonga people, a group with a long-established chiefly lineage in the region that today spans northern KwaZulu Natal and southern Mozambique, an area historically known as Maputaland or the defined Maputaland-Lubombo region.

== Early life and family background ==
His family belonged to the broader Tembe-Thonga people.

His father was King Noziyingile Tembe and his mother was Queen Zambili Dlamini, a daughter of Swazi King Sobhuza I.

The Tembe royal line traces its ancestry to early rulers such as Sikuke, Ludahumba, Silamboya and Mangobe as founding ancestors and its rise is attributed to 18th-century military rulers such as King Mangobe himself and his son Mabudu Tembe, whose kingdom extended from Delagoa Bay (Maputo) southwards to the area of Lake St. Lucia. Mabudu's line, known as the 'Mabudu-Tembe' or Mabudu Tembe Kingdom, established the political foundation later inherited by successive coastal rulers such as King Makasana and King Noziyingile and their descendants. Alongside this coastal line was an older inland branch descending from Mabudu's son King Mwayi, whose own son Prince Madingi Tembe ruled the inland Tembe territory. Madingi's lineage later produced Prince Makhuza Tembe, who became a rival claimant to authority during the late-19th-century succession disputes with the dominant coastal Ngwanase-Tembe branch under the heir Chief Ngwanase and Makhuza of the Makhuza-Tembe branch on the other hand.

== Regency and succession ==
Following the death of King Noziyingile, Ngwanase was not yet of age to assume leadership. His mother, Queen Zambili Dlamini, ruled as regent, maintaining the Tembe Kingdom's authority during a time of transition in the late 1800s.

Ngwanase was formally installed as Chief of Tembe in 1894. During the regency, a succession dispute arose between two senior Tembe lineages, the Ngwanase branch (descendants of Queen Zambili) and the Makhuza branch (descendants of Prince Madingi), which claimed authority in the inland territories. Earlier when King Noziyingile died, another son of King Noziyingile, Prince Muhena, declared himself ruler of the Tembe Kingdom with military support from King Cetshwayo of the Zulu Kingdom. Queen Zambili, using internal resistance and her strong Swazi royal lineage, overthrew Muhena and ruled as regent until Prince Ngwanase came of age in 1894 but only to rule a portion of the former Tembe land. These division, compounded by colonial interference from both the Portuguese in southern Mozambique and the British in northern KwaZulu Natal, fractured further what was once Southern Africa's most powerful state, the Tembe Kingdom.
