= Mozambique–South Africa border =

International border

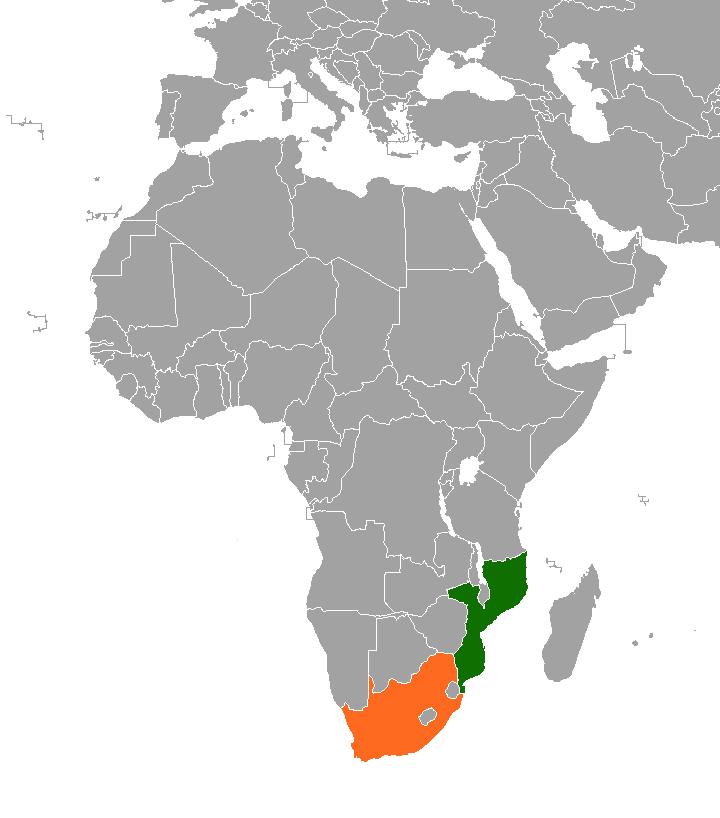
Mozambique (green) and South Africa (orange)

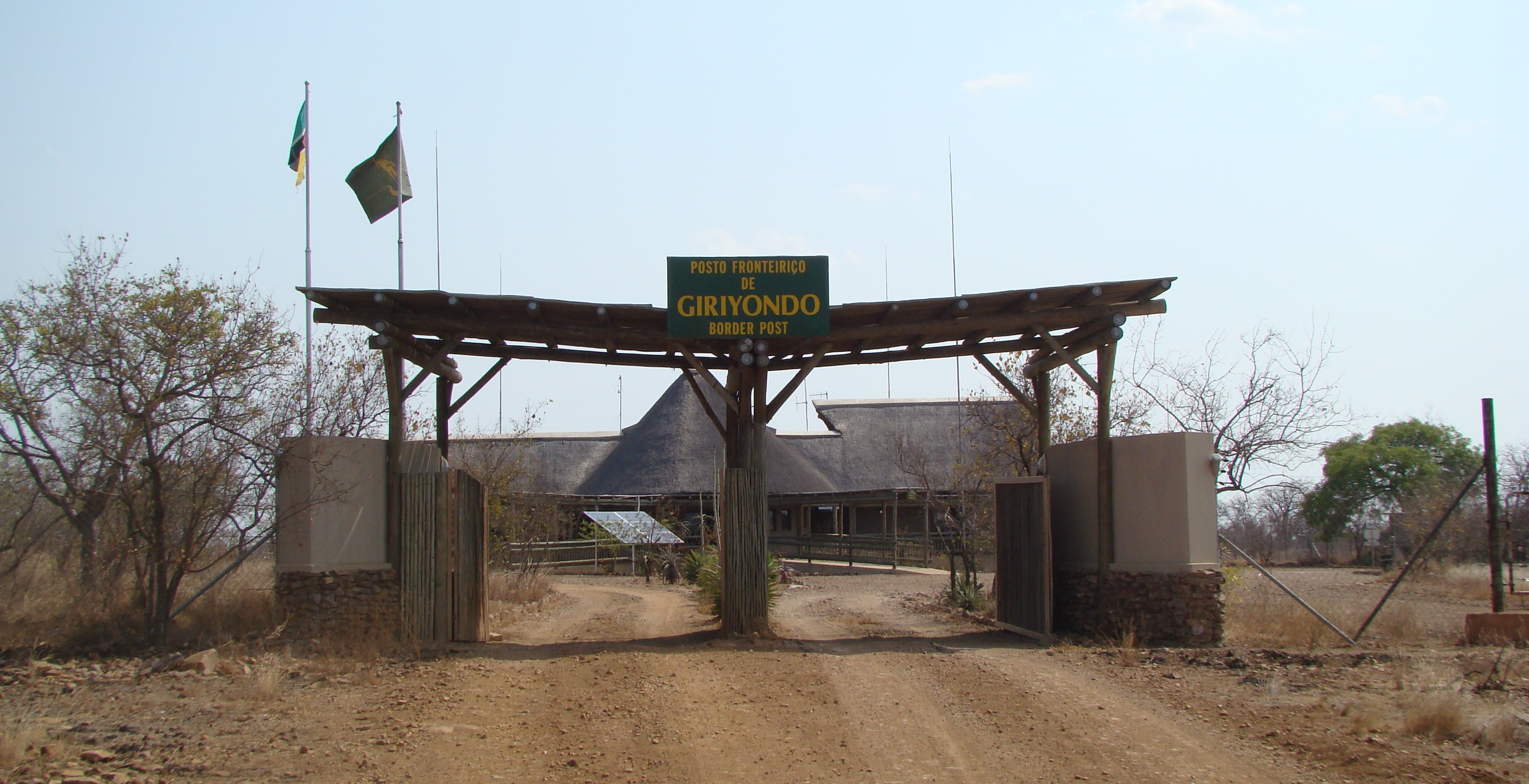
The smallest and youngest border crossing is Giriyondo in central Kruger National Park

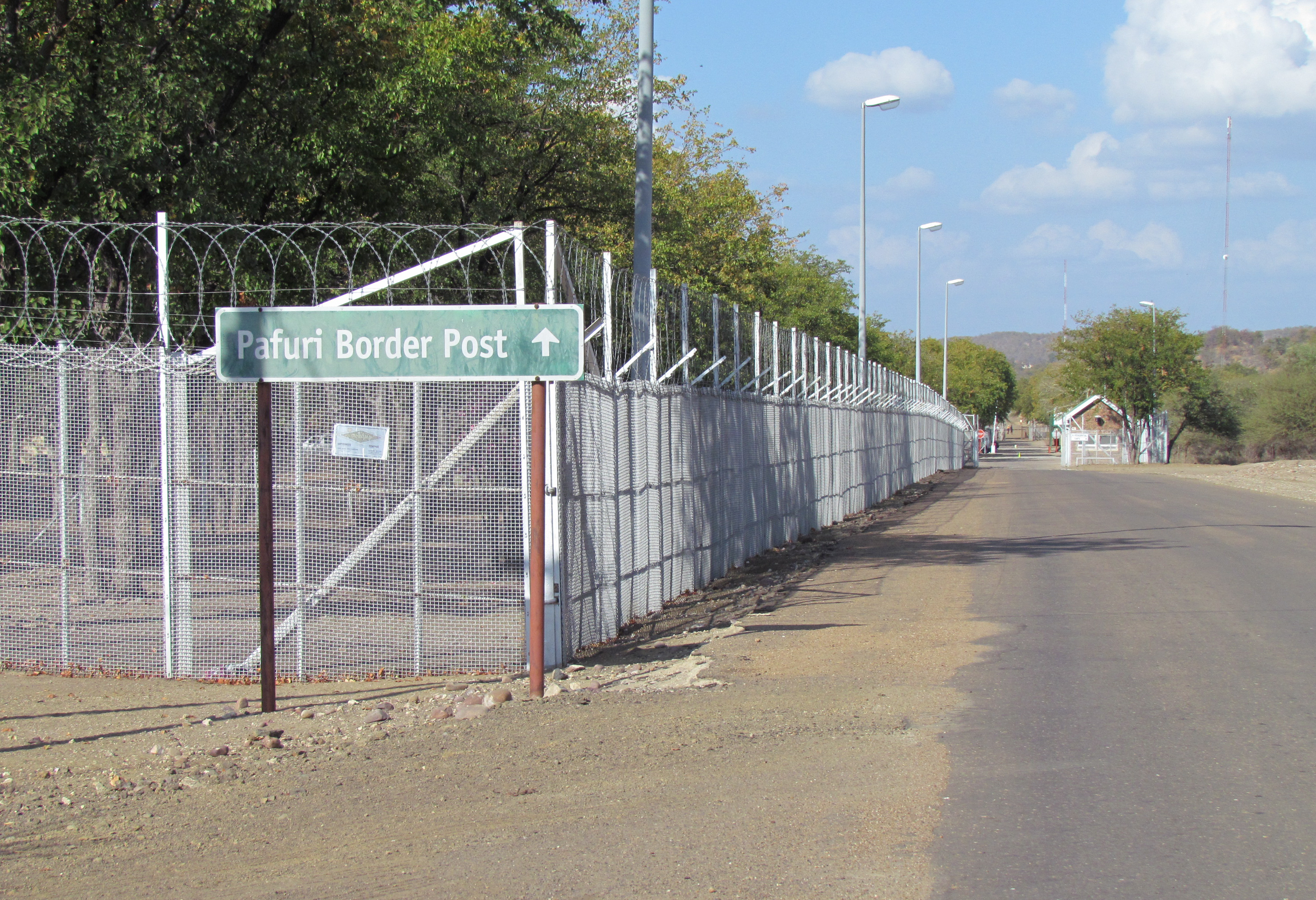
The Pafuri border crossing between the Kruger and Limpopo National Parks (into Mozambique)

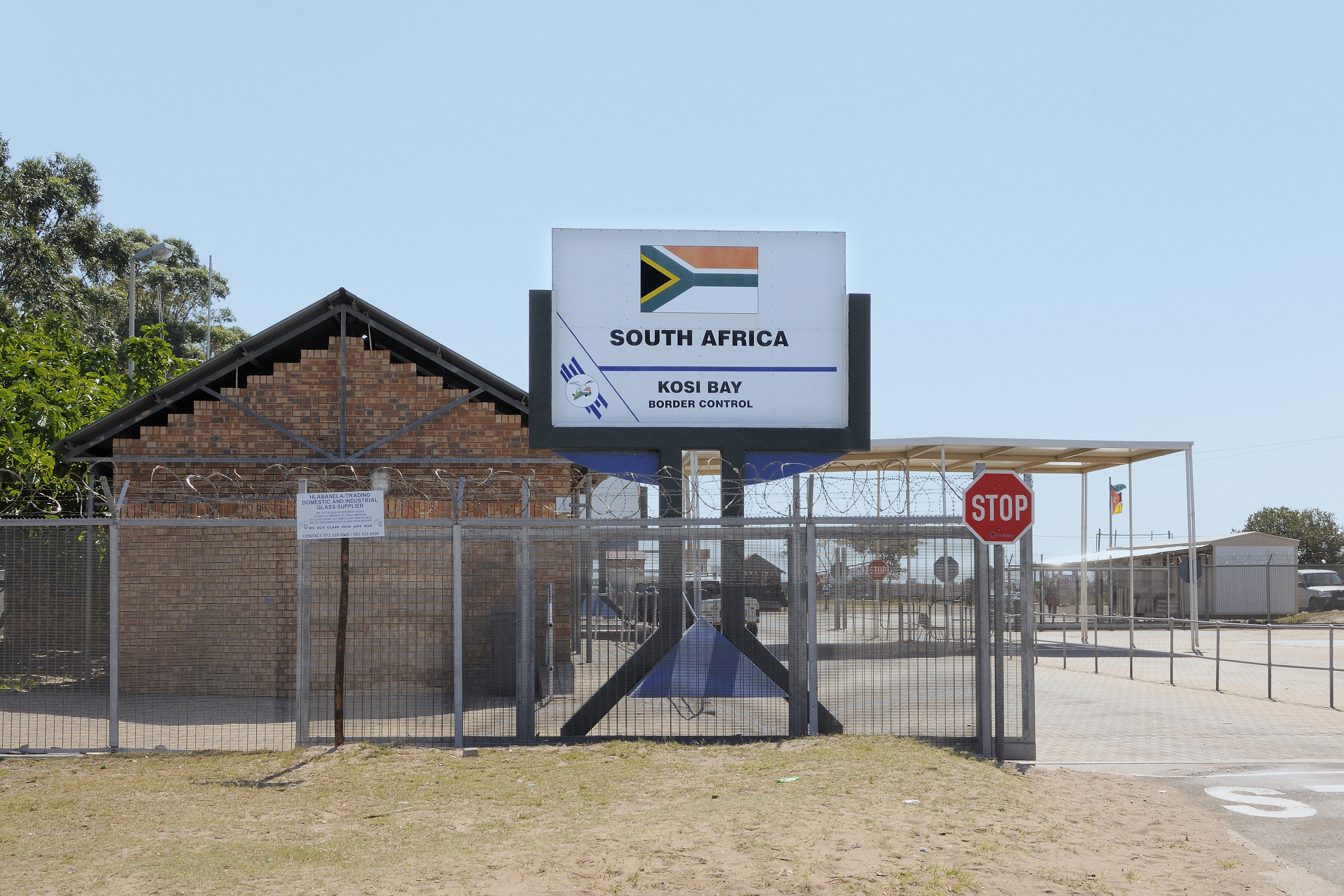
Kosi Bay border post in the southern part of the border

The border between Mozambique and South Africa is divided into two segments, separated by the kingdom of Eswatini. The northern segment, which is 410 kilometres (255 mi) long, runs north–south along the Lebombo Mountains from Zimbabwe to Eswatini. The southern segment, which is 81 kilometres (50 mi) long, runs east–west across Maputaland from Eswatini to the Indian Ocean.

== Geography ==
The tripoint with Zimbabwe is located at Crooks' Corner, in the Limpopo River either at or very close to its confluence with the Luvuvhu River. The border runs in a straight line from this tripoint to the Shingwedzi River, and then along a series of straight lines joining beacons generally along the top of the eastern slope of the Lebombo Mountains. It crosses the Olifants, Sabie and Komati rivers. This segment of the border terminates at the northern Eswatini tripoint at Mpundweni Beacon near Namaacha.

The southern Eswatini tripoint is situated at Abercorn Drift in the Usutu River (Maputo River), where the Mozambique–Eswatini border along the Lebombo Mountains meets the river. From here the border follows the Usuthu to its former confluence with the Pongola River; the location of the confluence has changed since the border was demarcated. The border then runs in an easterly direction along straight lines joining beacons generally at the same latitude as the Usutu-Pongola confluence (approximately 26° 52′ South). It meets the Indian Ocean below Monte Ouro peak, just to the south of Ponta do Ouro.

== Crossings ==
There are four official border crossings, three in the northern segment and one in the southern segment. The main crossing is Ressano Garcia/Lebombo where the Maputo Corridor highway and railway cross the border. The crossings are listed from north to south in the table below. The Mozambican and South African Governments announced on 18 March 2018 that the Ressano Garcia border would open 24 hours starting in April of that same year

Mozambique		South Africa		Opening hours	Notes	Geographical coordinates
Road	Border post	Road	Border post	Opening hours	Notes	Geographical coordinates
Northern segment
	Pafuri	S63	Pafuri	8:00–16:00	Crossing in the Great Limpopo Transfrontier Park.	22.4490°S 31.3157°E
	Giriyondo	H15	Giriyondo	8:00–16:00 October–March; 8:00–15:00 April–September	Crossing in the Great Limpopo Transfrontier Park; tourist use only.	23.5840°S 31.6600°E
EN4	Ressano Garcia	N4	Lebombo	24 hours per day		25.4431°S 31.9867°E
Southern segment
	Ponta do Ouro	R22	Kosi Bay	8:00–16:00		26.8643°S 32.8293°E
