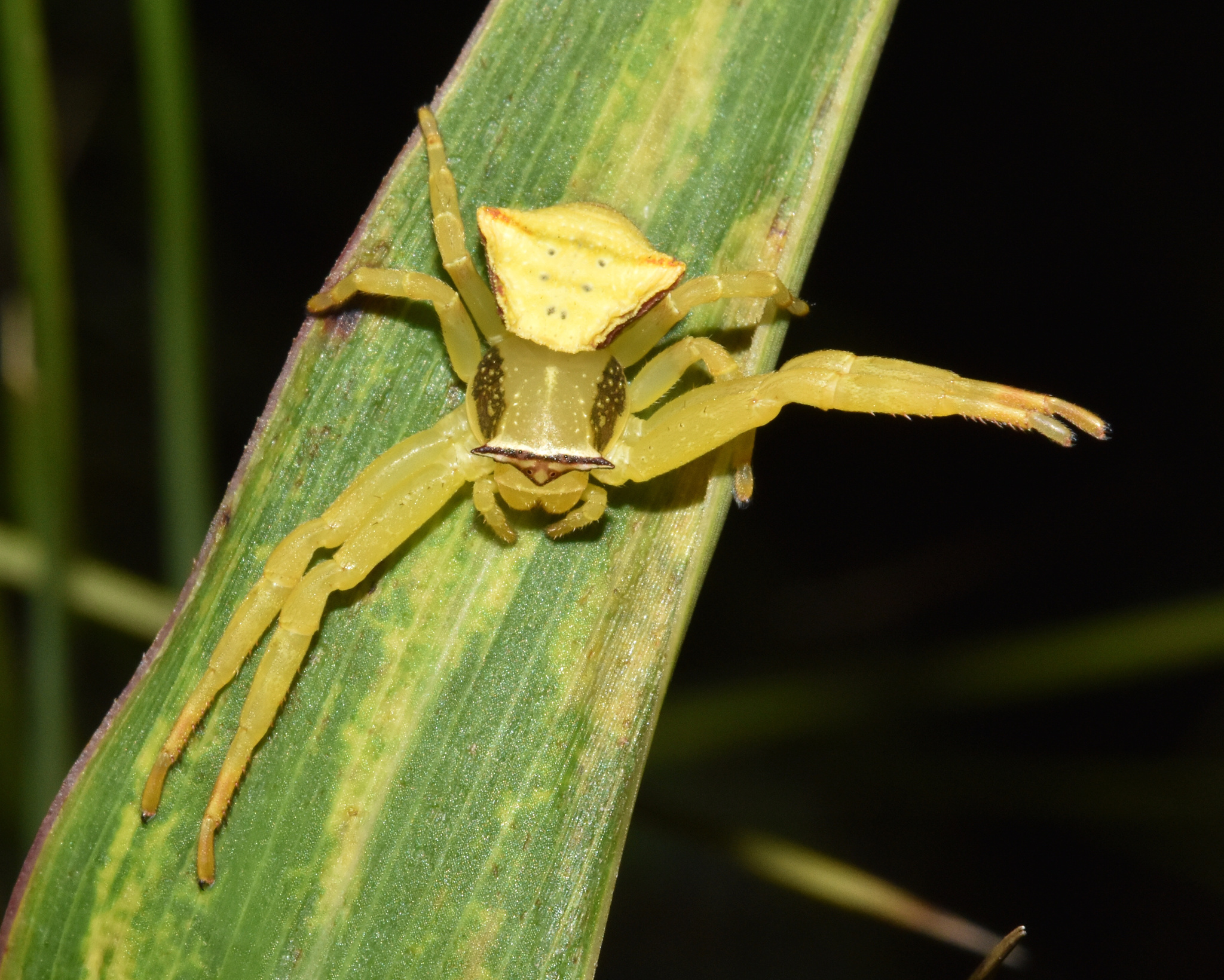
- Female from Durban
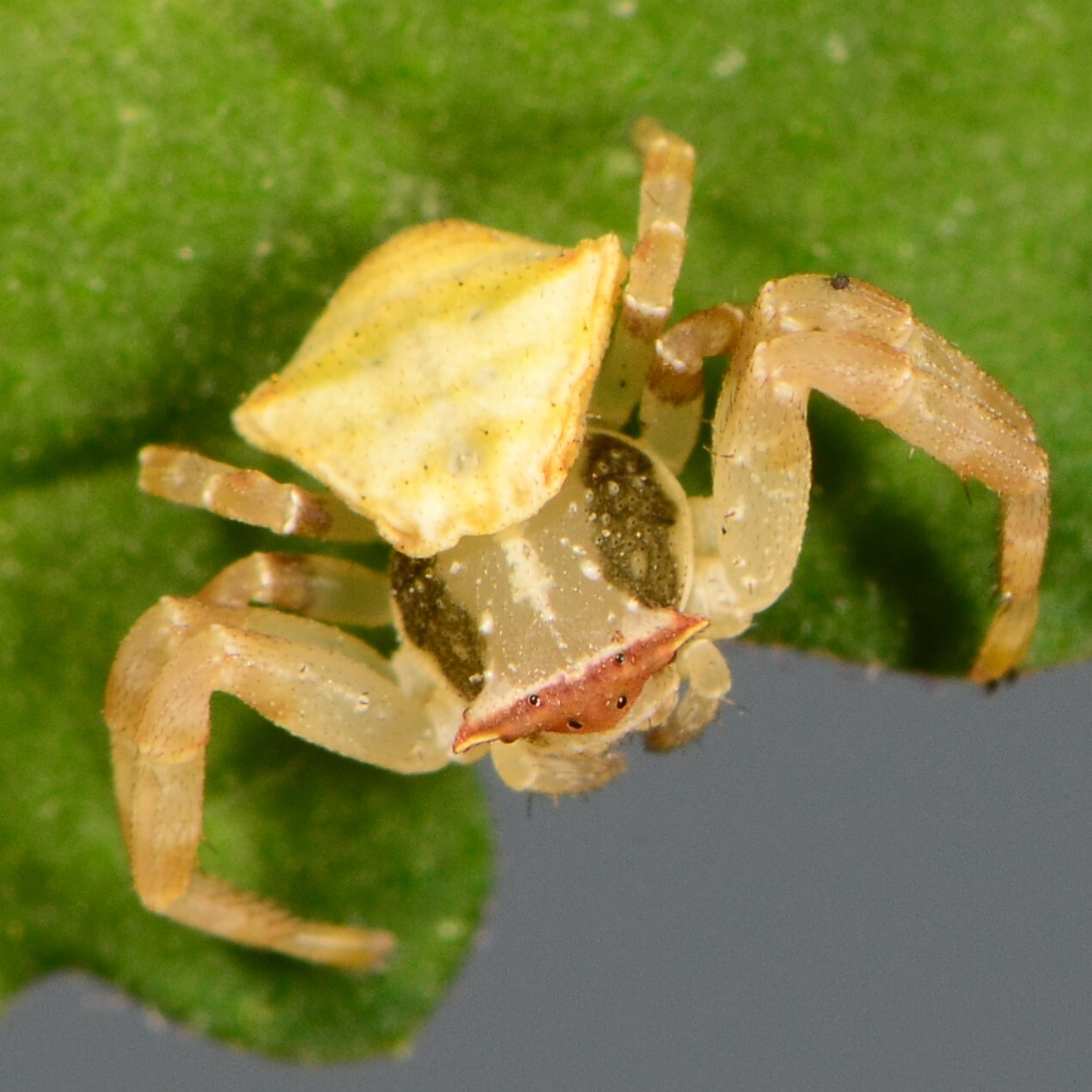
- Female

Scientific classification
- Kingdom: Animalia
- Phylum: Arthropoda
- Subphylum: Chelicerata
- Class: Arachnida
- Order: Araneae
- Infraorder: Araneomorphae
- Family: Thomisidae
- Genus: Thomisus
- Species: T. zuluanus

Binomial name
- Thomisus zuluanus Lawrence, 1942

= Thomisus zuluanus =

Zululand's Thomisus Crab Spider

Species of spider

Thomisus zuluanus is a species of crab spider in the family Thomisidae. It is endemic to South Africa.

== Etymology ==
The species name references the KwaZulu locality where the species was first described from.

== Distribution ==
Thomisus zuluanus is known only from the KwaZulu-Natal province of South Africa. The species was originally described from Kosi Bay in what was then Zululand.

== Habitat ==
The species is free-living on plants and has been sampled from Forest, Indian Ocean coastal belt and Savanna biomes.

== Description ==
Thomisus zuluanus is known only from the female, with males remaining undescribed.

The female has a total length of 7.5 mm, with a cephalothorax length of 3.7 mm and width of 4.0 mm. The carapace and legs are yellow, mottled with white markings. The carapace displays a distinctive triangular pattern when viewed from the front, which is tinged with brown. The cephalic area has a few faint white broken lines, while the opisthosoma is ivory-white.

The carapace is elevated in the cephalic area, with both eye rows slightly recurved. The anterior eyes are equal in size but larger than the posterior eyes, while the posterior eyes are equal in size among themselves. The opisthosoma is pentagonal in shape with indistinct tubercles. The first and second pairs of legs are stout, with strong setae on the femora. The body is covered with small tubercles, each bearing a stout seta that can be easily lost.

The epigyne is not very distinct and features a narrow median septum.

== Conservation status ==
Thomisus zuluanus is listed as Data Deficient due to taxonomic reasons, as the male remains unknown and the species' full range is uncertain. It is considered a very rare species with a small extent of occurrence and area of occupancy. The species is found in protected areas including Kosi Bay Nature Reserve and Tembe Elephant Park.
