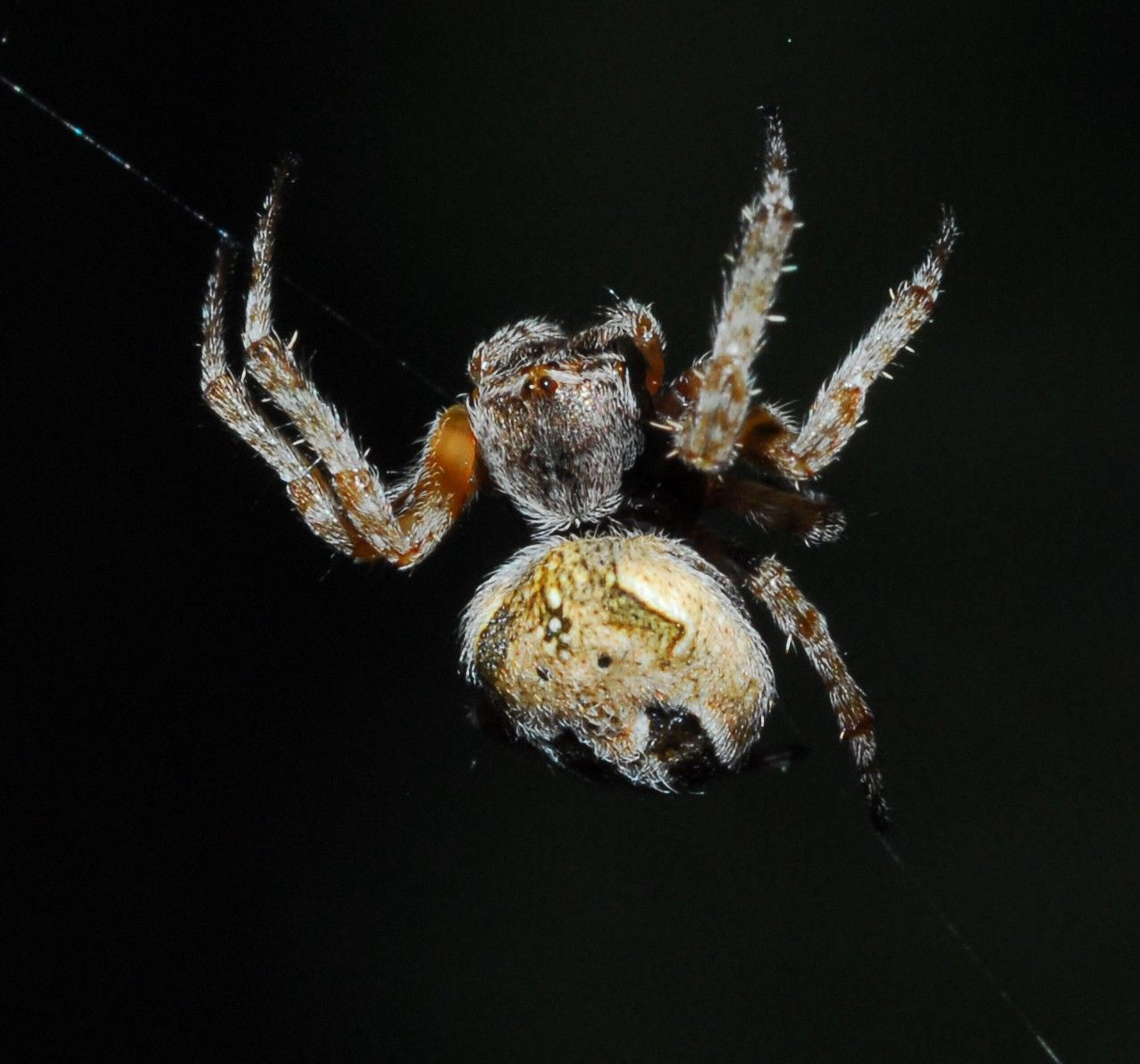
- female
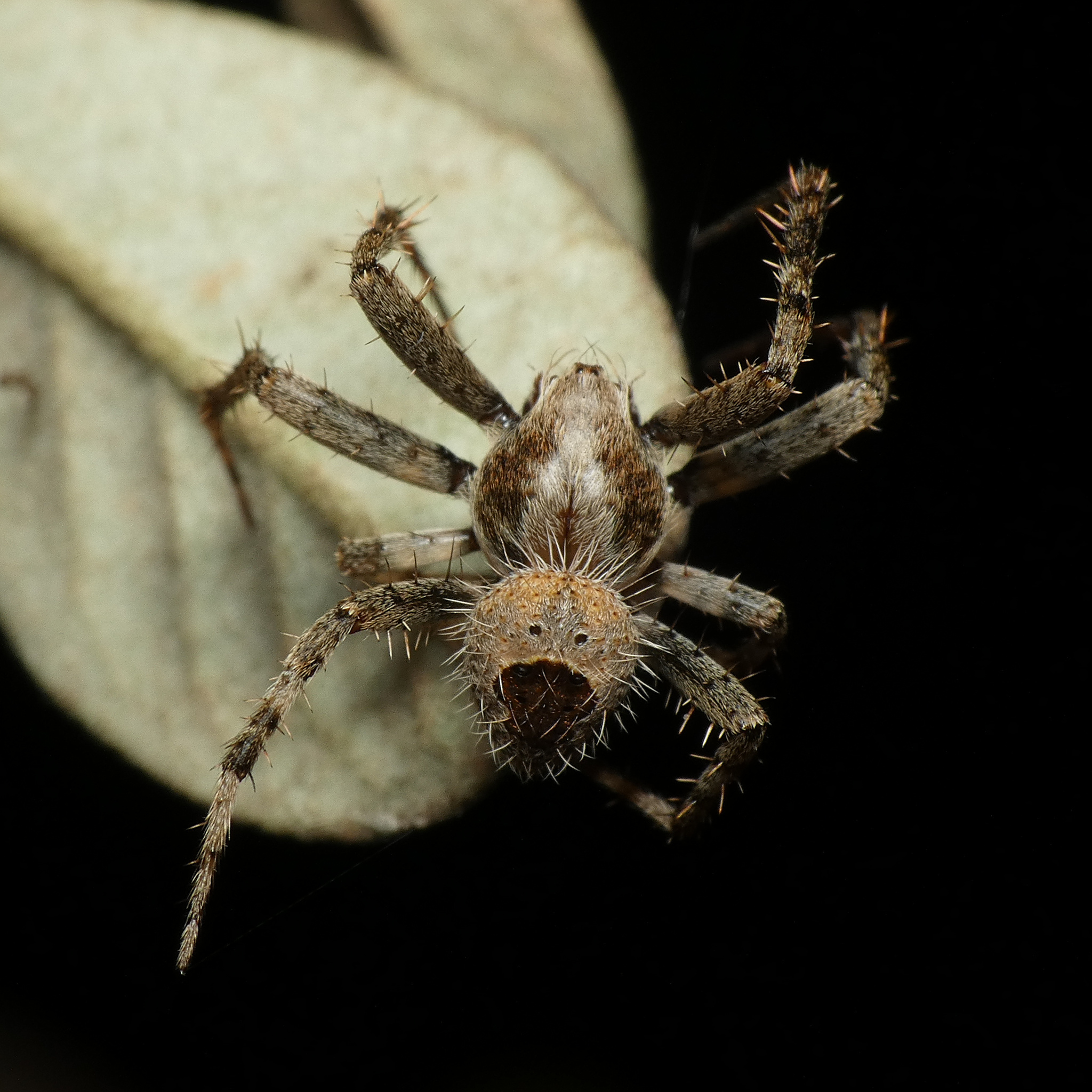
- male

Scientific classification
- Kingdom: Animalia
- Phylum: Arthropoda
- Subphylum: Chelicerata
- Class: Arachnida
- Order: Araneae
- Infraorder: Araneomorphae
- Family: Araneidae
- Genus: Araneus
- Species: A. nigroquadratus

Binomial name
- Araneus nigroquadratus Lawrence, 1937

= Araneus nigroquadratus =

Black-spotted Araneus Hairy Field Spider

Species of spider

Araneus nigroquadratus is a species of spider in the family Araneidae. It is commonly known as the black-spotted Araneus hairy field spider.

== Distribution ==
Araneus nigroquadratus occurs in Namibia and South Africa. In South Africa, the species is known from six provinces at altitudes ranging from 0 to 1,842 m above sea level.

== Habitat and ecology ==
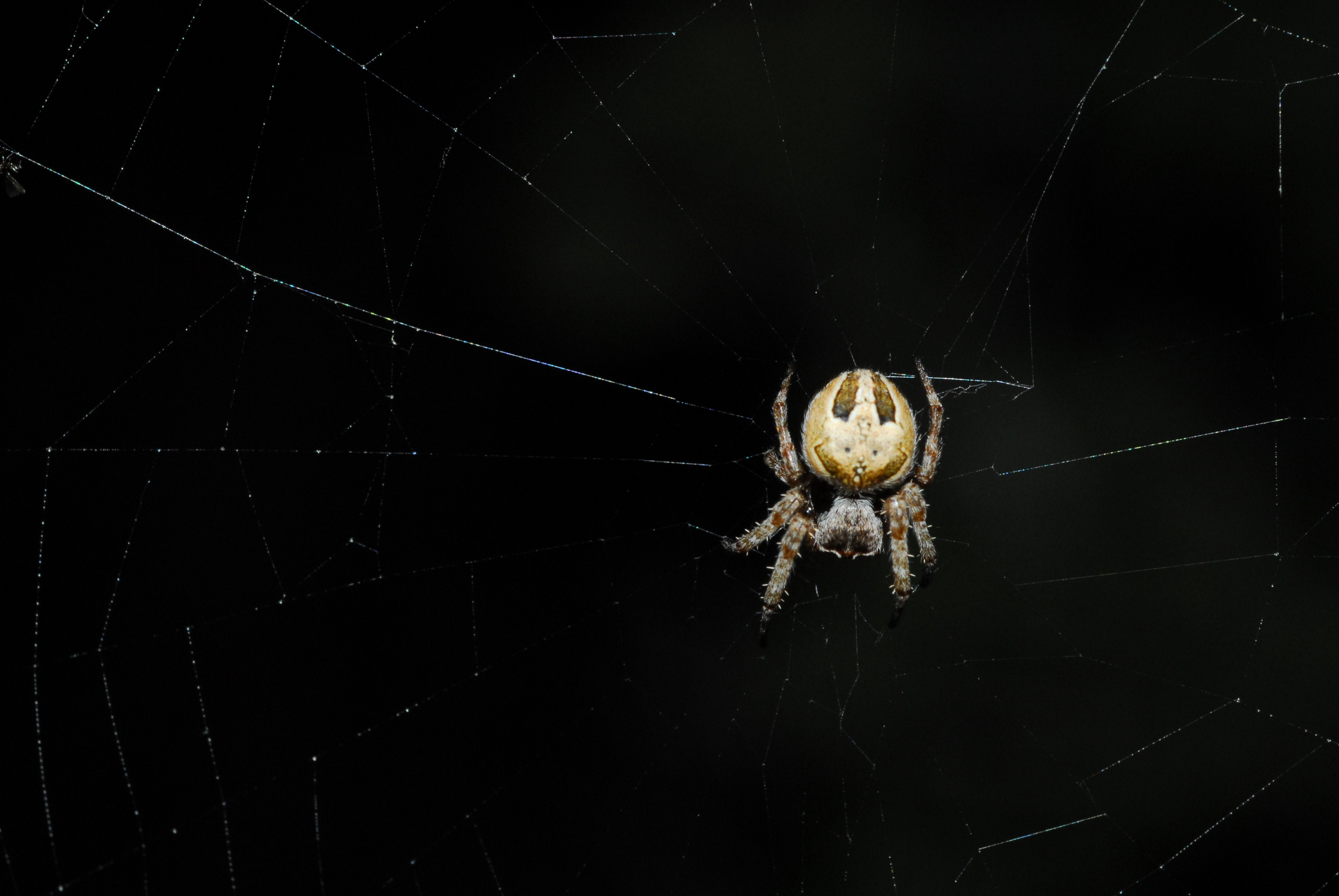
female A. nigroquadratus in web

This orb-web spider constructs large orb-webs at night. The species has been sampled from the Savanna, Indian Ocean Coastal Belt, Grassland, Fynbos, and Thicket biomes. It has also been collected from pine plantations and tomato fields.

== Description ==
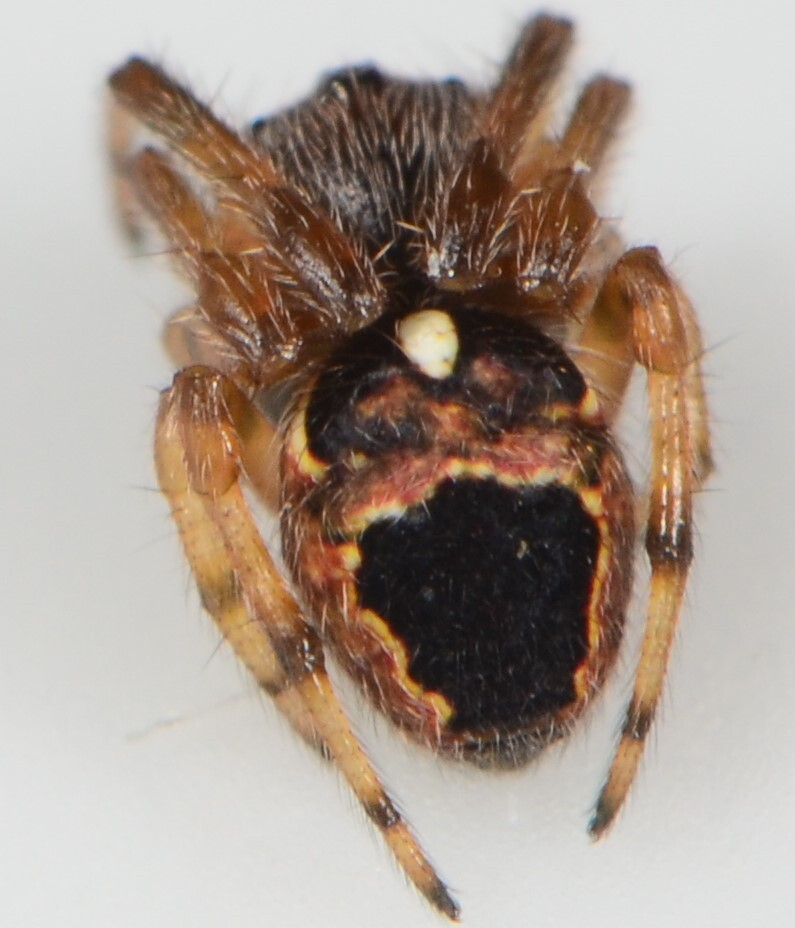
female

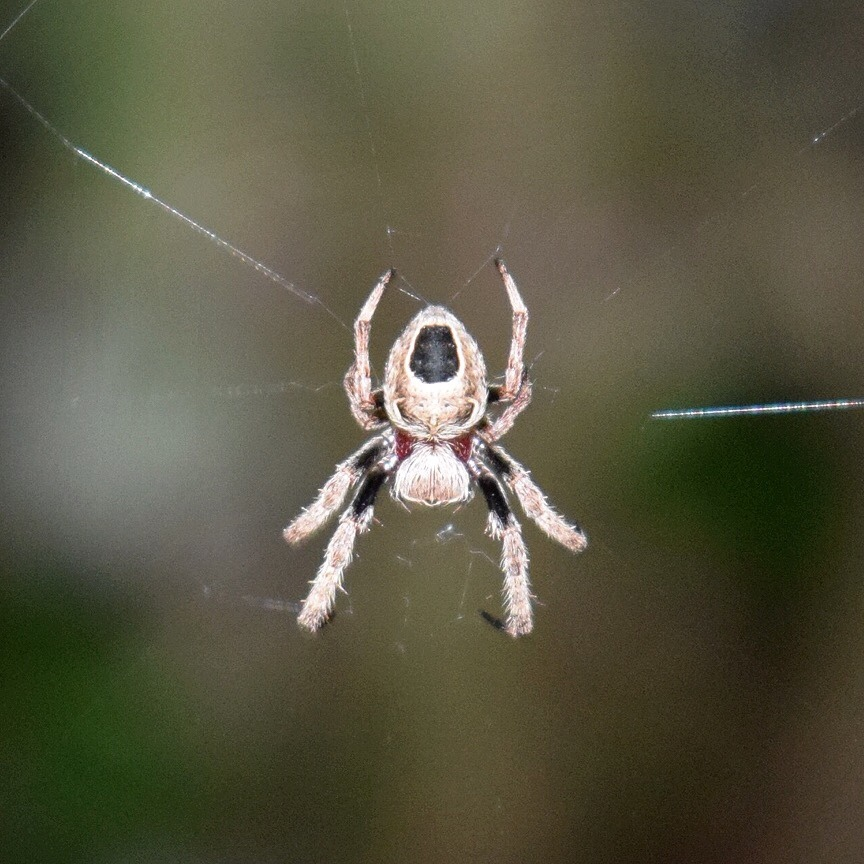
female

== Conservation ==
Araneus nigroquadratus is listed as Least Concern by the South African National Biodiversity Institute due to its wide geographical range. The species is protected in more than 10 protected areas including Mkambathi Nature Reserve, Tembe Elephant Park, Addo National Park, and Lhuvhondo Nature Reserve.

== Taxonomy ==
The species was originally described by Reginald Frederick Lawrence in 1937 from Kosi Bay. It has not been revised and identification of the male is still problematic.

A. nigroquadratus is known only from a female specimen, with the male remaining undescribed.
