= R22 (South Africa) =

Provincial route in South Africa

Provincial route R22

Route information
- Maintained by SANRAL
- Length: 170 km (110 mi)

Major junctions
- South end: N2 near Hluhluwe
- North end: Mozambique border at Kosi Bay

Location
- Country: South Africa
- Major cities: Hluhluwe; Mbazwana; Kwangwanase

Highway system
- Numbered routes of South Africa
← R21	→ R23

The R22 is a provincial route in the KwaZulu-Natal province of South Africa, connecting the N2 at Hluhluwe with the Mozambique border at Kosi Bay, via Mbazwana and Kwangwanase. It was opened on 25 October 2008.

== Route ==
The R22 begins at an intersection with the N2 national route west of Hluhluwe. It begins by heading eastwards into Hluhluwe before making a left and right turn to bypass the Hluhluwe River mouth on Lake St. Lucia and continue northwards. It heads for 27 kilometres (17 mi) to reach the village of Mduku east of the Phinda Private Game Reserve and west of the ISimangaliso Wetland Park. It continues for 50 kilometres (31 mi), crossing the Mkuze River, to reach Mbazwana (west of Sodwana Bay and the Sodwana Bay National Park).

It continues for 46 kilometres (29 mi), bypassing Lake Sibaya in the Maputaland, to reach a roundabout in Phelandaba, where it turns to the north-east. It heads for 22 kilometres (14 mi) to reach the town of KwaNgwanase (also known as Manguzi and Kosi Bay Town) before heading another 18 kilometres (11 mi) (bypassing the Kosi Bay lakes) to reach the Kosi Bay border with Mozambique. It becomes the N200 road on the Mozambique side of the border and connects to Maputo (capital of Mozambique; 110 km (68 mi) away). The border on the Mozambique side is named Ponta do Ouro.

Detailed Route
