= Tembe Kingdom =

Precolonial Nguni kingdom in southern Mozambique and northeastern South Africa

Tembe Kingdom Tembe Kingdom
- c. 1554–late 1800s
- Status: Chiefdom
- Capital: Manguzi / Tembe area
- Common languages: Tsonga, Nguni dialects
- Religion: Traditional African religion
- Government: Monarchy
- Historical era: Precolonial Africa
  - Established: c. 1554
  - Colonial incorporation: late 1800s
- Currency: Cattle and trade goods
- Today part of: South Africa, Mozambique

The Tembe Kingdom was a precolonial chiefly domain centred on Delagoa Bay (now Maputo Bay) on the southeast African coast, occupying coastal areas of southern Mozambique and parts of northeastern KwaZulu Natal in South Africa, particularly within the region today known as Maputaland, and lying to the east of the inland territory of present-day Eswatini.

Its territory included the Kosi Bay and Manguzi areas and also extended inland towards the lower reaches of the Lubombo Mountains. The Maputaland-Lubombo region formed part of a broader landscape of interacting Nguni-speaking chiefdoms before colonial boundary formation. The legacy of the Tembe Kingdom persists today through the Tembe Tribal Authority, which represents the continuation of the kingdom’s chiefly lineage within South Africa’s modern traditional leadership system. The history of the Tembe shows that they existed from the 16th century, with Tembe serving as the first recorded leader in the 1500s.

== Origin ==
The Tembe people trace their origins to the Kalanga communities of the present-day Zimbabwe region, migrating southwards beginning in the 13th century. Scholars also suggest link between the Tembe people and the Mapungubwe following the discovery of pottery on Tembe cemetery. Some accounts suggest that Tembe was a son of Mwali (likely Mwali I, because of the recurrence of the name in later generations). Mwali I is, in turn, thought to have been a son of Nsilambowa and on this basis, Tembe may have been the fourth-generation leader following the lineage’s departure from Mapungubwe. The group’s arrival at the Nkomati River was preserved largely in Tembe oral tradition. By the 17th and 18th centuries, they had established a recognised kingdom in the coastal lowlands, adapting to local conditions and gradually incorporating influences from the Tsonga (Rhonga) linguistic and cultural groups. They were one of the earliest documented chiefdoms to control and participate in long-distance trade networks with European merchants along the Indian Ocean coast during the 17th and 18th centuries. Various historical traditions identify figures such as Sikuke, Ludahumba, Silamboya and Mangobe as founding ancestors of the Tembe family.

The Tembe chieftaincy is historically linked with the wider Embo communities of the eastern Maputaland-Lubombo region.

Portuguese, Dutch and British ships anchored at Delagoa Bay to acquire ivory and slaves from the Tembe. Tembe chiefs exchanged ivory for glass beads, brass and cloth. Control of ivory hunting grounds increased royal wealth and patronage, enabling the Tembe rulers to recruit warriors for control of the area.The kingdom was ruled by a succession of chiefs, although historical records of leadership are sometimes unclear due to the repetition of names across generations and distortions in oral histories.Their society combined traditional governance, coastal trade and cattle-based economy prior to European colonial incursions.

== Internal division and colonial era ==
The Tembe royal house was fractured because of internal succession disputes. Following the death of King Silamboya in 1746, the Tembe-Thonga lineage was divided into two branches: one, the Matutwen-Tembe, settled west of the Maputo River, while the other, under King Mangobe Tembe and later his younger son King Mabudu, settled east of the Maputo River. King Mabudu established himself as the stronger leader, taking over power from his older brother Crown Prince Nkupo II, and his lineage became known as the Mabudu branch or the Mabudu Tembe Kingdom, considered one of the strongest political and economic units in south-eastern Africa during the mid-18th century.

The Mabudu Tembe Kingdom's territory reportedly extended from the Maputo River in the west to the Indian Ocean in the east, and from Delagoa (Maputo) Bay in the north to as far south as Lake St. Lucia by the early 1800s.

The Mabudu lineage emerges within the broader Tembe-Thonga political landscape, itself the result of success disagreements.

During the late 19th and early 20th century, another division amongst the Tembes emerged, which further fractured the Kingdom: a succession dispute between the son of King Noziyingile Tembe - Chief Ngwanase Tembe and his nephew Makhuza Tembe over the chieftaincy. Ngwanase’s line established itself along the coastal zone around what is today KwaNgwanase ("at Ngwanase's area"; also known as Manguzi), and this lineage would become the dominant chiefly authority in the twentieth century and today forms the basis of the present-day Tembe Tribal Authority, recognised in South Africa’s post-apartheid traditional leadership framework. The Makhuza branch retained influence among inland Tembe communities, particularly those situated closer to the Lubombo mountains, reflecting the continuation of parallel houses within the historical Tembe Kingdom. According to Mthethwa (2002), the inland region of the Tembe Kingdom was initially governed by Prince Madingi Tembe (Makhuza's father) during the reign of his father King Mwayi and (later) his brother King Makasana. Upon Prince Madingi's death, Makhuza took over as leader of the inland Tembe territories and refused to recognise Prince Ngwanase (son of King Noziyingile) as the legitimate Chief of Tembe. Colonial officials in Maputaland formally recognised Prince Ngwanase as the legitimate ruler of the Tembe polity. This decision resulted in “the land and people which was originally ruled by Makhuza now [falling] under the authority of Ngwanase.”

The succession conflict occurred during a period when colonial powers were extending administrative control over the broader region of Maputaland. Both Portuguese authorities in southern Mozambique and British officials in northern KwaZulu Natal attempted to define borders and appoint compliant chiefs, which disrupted longstanding Tembe political structures.

Tembe chiefs participated in negotiations with colonial authorities and maintained control over key coastal trade areas, particularly for ivory, which remained a valuable commodity for exchange with European merchants.

The period also saw the integration of Tembe society into broader colonial labour networks. Some Tembe individuals became migrant labourers in South African mines, while the ruling elite leveraged European trade connections to maintain royal patronage and consolidate power over the Tembe territory.

== Relations with inland powers ==
The Tembe Kingdom maintained complex relations with inland Nguni powers, including the Ndwandwe, Dlaminis, Mthethwa and early Zulu chiefdoms. While some oral and historical sources indicate that the Tembe occasionally offered tribute or gifts to these inland groups, the Tembe retained formal independence due to their wealth from coastal trade with Europeans and control over key ivory hunting grounds.

They maintained their coastal authority and influence as they negotiated trade and diplomatic arrangements, which allowed them to resist incorporation into inland military confederations, even as Ndwandwe, Mthethwa, and later Zulu chiefdoms kept expanding and posing threats. This economic and political autonomy enabled the Tembe to remain a distinct coastal polity well into the colonial period.

== List of Tembe rulers ==
The following is a verified list of Tembe rulers from King Sikuke to current Chief of Tembe.

Name	Reign	Notes
King Sikuke	c.1692-1710	First verifiable Tembe ruler after the genealogical gap
King Ludahumba	1710-1728	Successor to King Sikuke
King Silamboya	1728-1746	Consolidated Tembe authority during early coastal-inland interactions
King Mangobe	1746-1764	Predecessor to Mabudu; pivotal ruler before the rise of the Mabudu-Tembe branch
King Mabudu	1764-1782	Founder of the Mabudu-Tembe branch; powerful 18th-century ruler
King Mwayi	1782-1800	Successor to Mabudu; father of Makasana and Madingi
King Makasana	1800-1854	Major ruler during early 19th-century upheavals; father of King Noziyingile Tembe
King Noziyingile Tembe	1854-1886	Father of Prince Ngwanase; strengthened Tembe polity during colonial encroachment
Queen Zambili Dlamini (Regent)	1886-1894	Regent for Prince Ngwanase following Noziyingile’s death
Chief Ngwanase Tembe	1894-1928	Installed after regency; founder of the modern Ngwanase-Tembe branch
Chief Mhlupeki Tembe	1928-1950	Son of Ngwanase; ruled through early apartheid years
Chief Mzimba Tembe	1951-2000	Son of Mhlupeki; long-serving 20th-century chief
Chief Mabhudu Israel Tembe	2001-present	Current Chief of Tembe, currently leading the Tembe Tribal Authority
