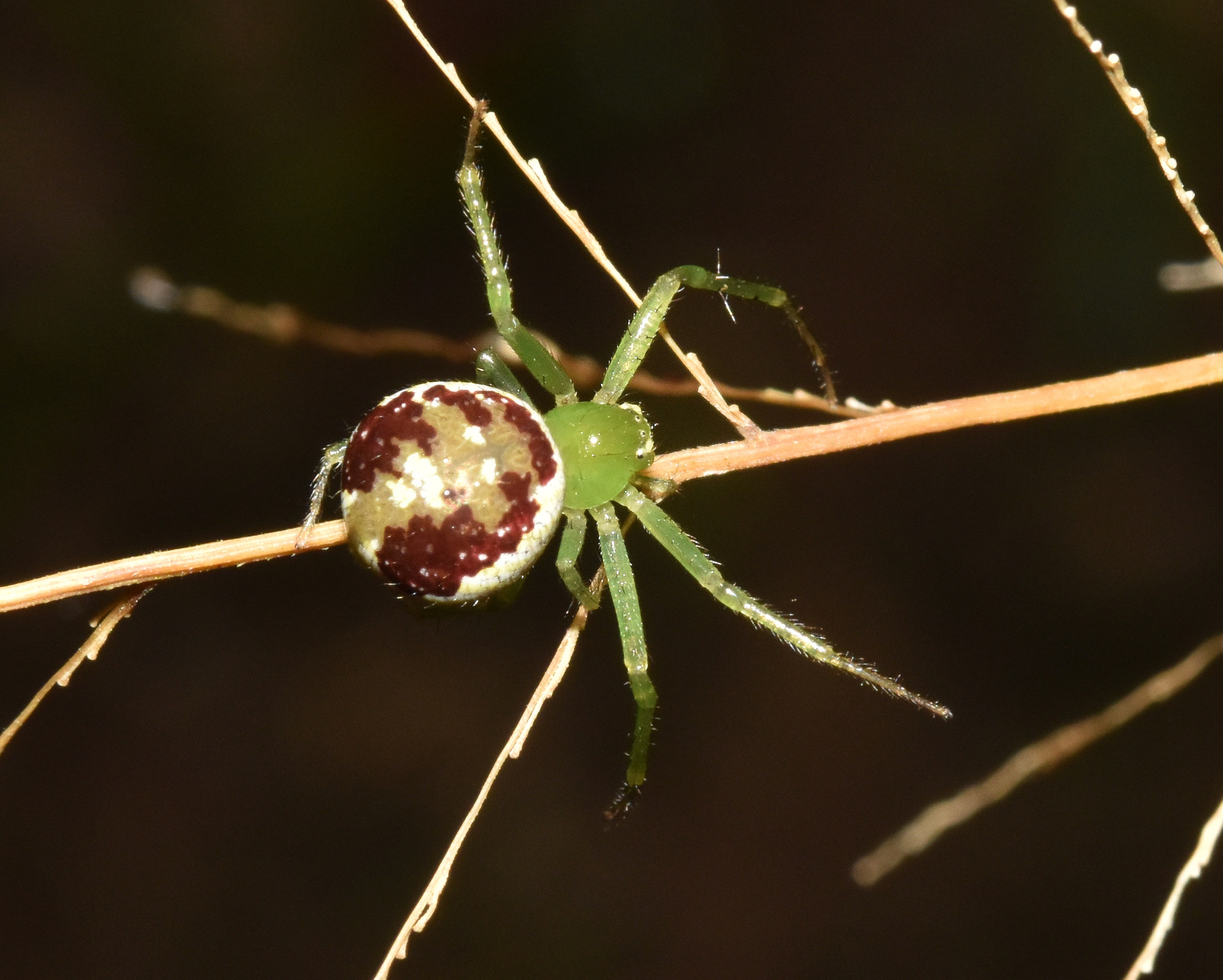
- Female from South Africa
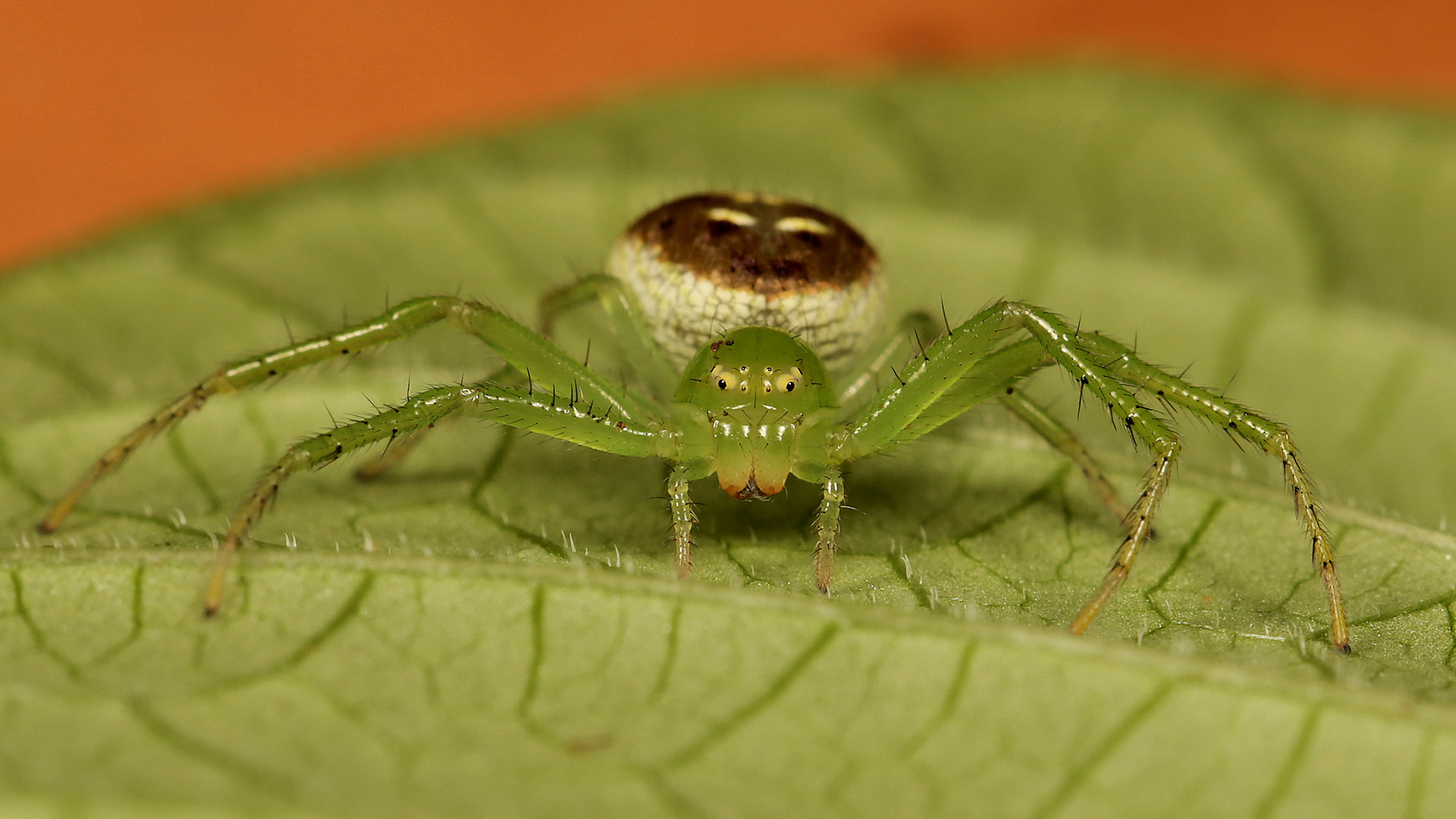
- Female from South Africa

Scientific classification
- Kingdom: Animalia
- Phylum: Arthropoda
- Subphylum: Chelicerata
- Class: Arachnida
- Order: Araneae
- Infraorder: Araneomorphae
- Family: Thomisidae
- Genus: Synema
- Species: S. langheldi

Binomial name
- Synema langheldi Dahl, 1907

Synonyms
- Synaema langheldi Dahl, 1907

= Synema langheldi =

Species of spider

Synema langheldi is a species of crab spider in the family Thomisidae. Commonly known as the spotted African mask spider, it is endemic to eastern and southern Africa. The species was first described by Friedrich Dahl in 1907 from a juvenile specimen collected in Somalia.

== Etymology ==
The specific epithet langheldi honors the collector. Other species include the beetle Graphipterus langheldi, the skink species Trachylepis langheldi and the solifugid Zeria langheldi.

== Taxonomy ==
The species was originally described as Synaema langheldi by Dahl in 1907.

== Distribution ==
Synema langheldi has been recorded from Somalia, Tanzania, and South Africa. In South Africa, the species is widely distributed across the Eastern Cape, Gauteng, KwaZulu-Natal, Limpopo, Mpumalanga, and Western Cape provinces of South Africa. Notable localities include Durban's Stamford Hill (the type locality), Addo Elephant National Park, Tembe Elephant Park, and various nature reserves.

== Habitat ==
Synema langheldi is a free-living species found on vegetation and occasionally inside flower corollas. The species has been sampled in the Indian Ocean Coastal Belt, Grassland, Savanna and Thicket biomes. Like other crab spiders, it is an ambush predator that waits motionlessly on flowers or leaves to capture prey.

The species occurs at elevations ranging from 16 to 1,341 meters above sea level.

== Description ==
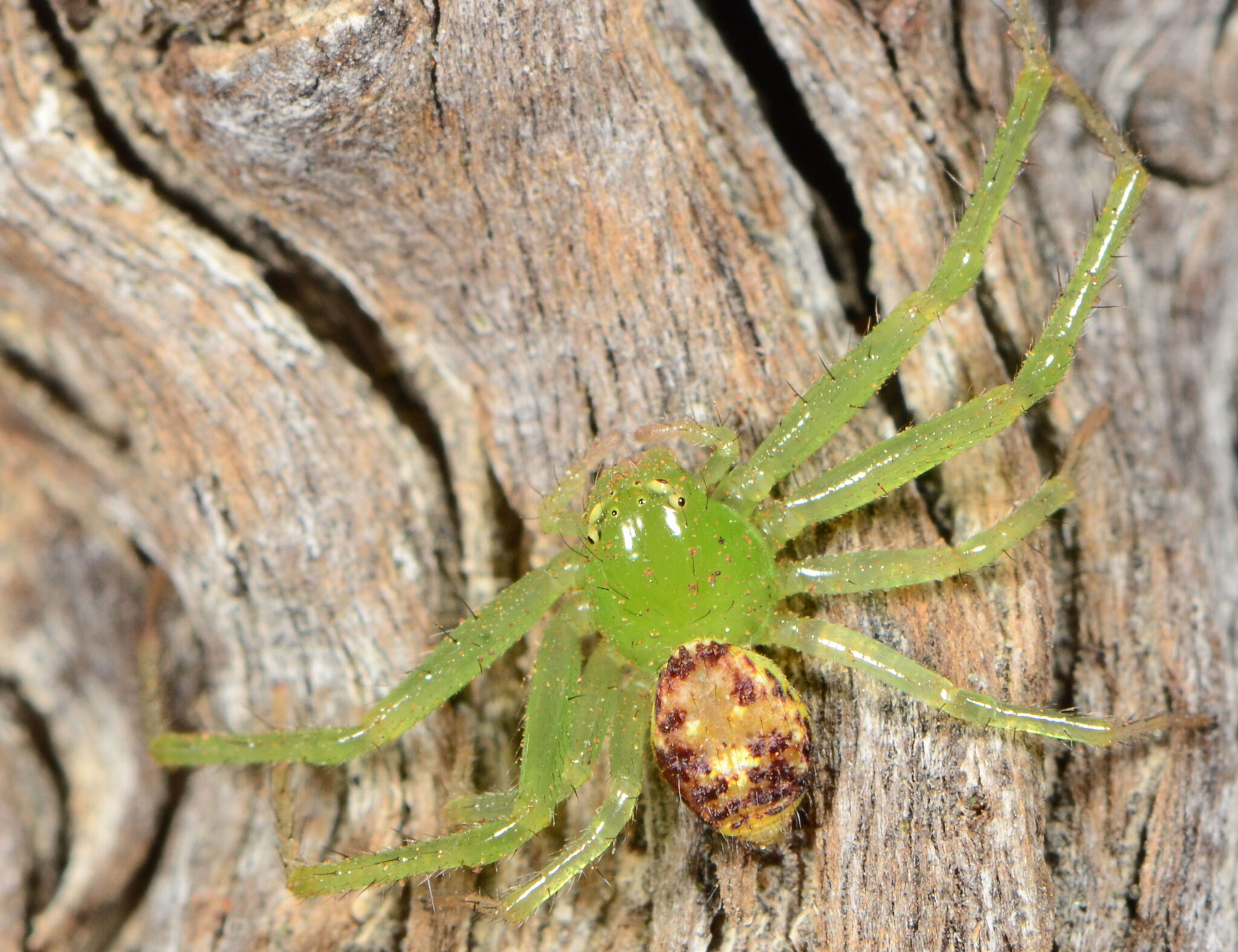
female

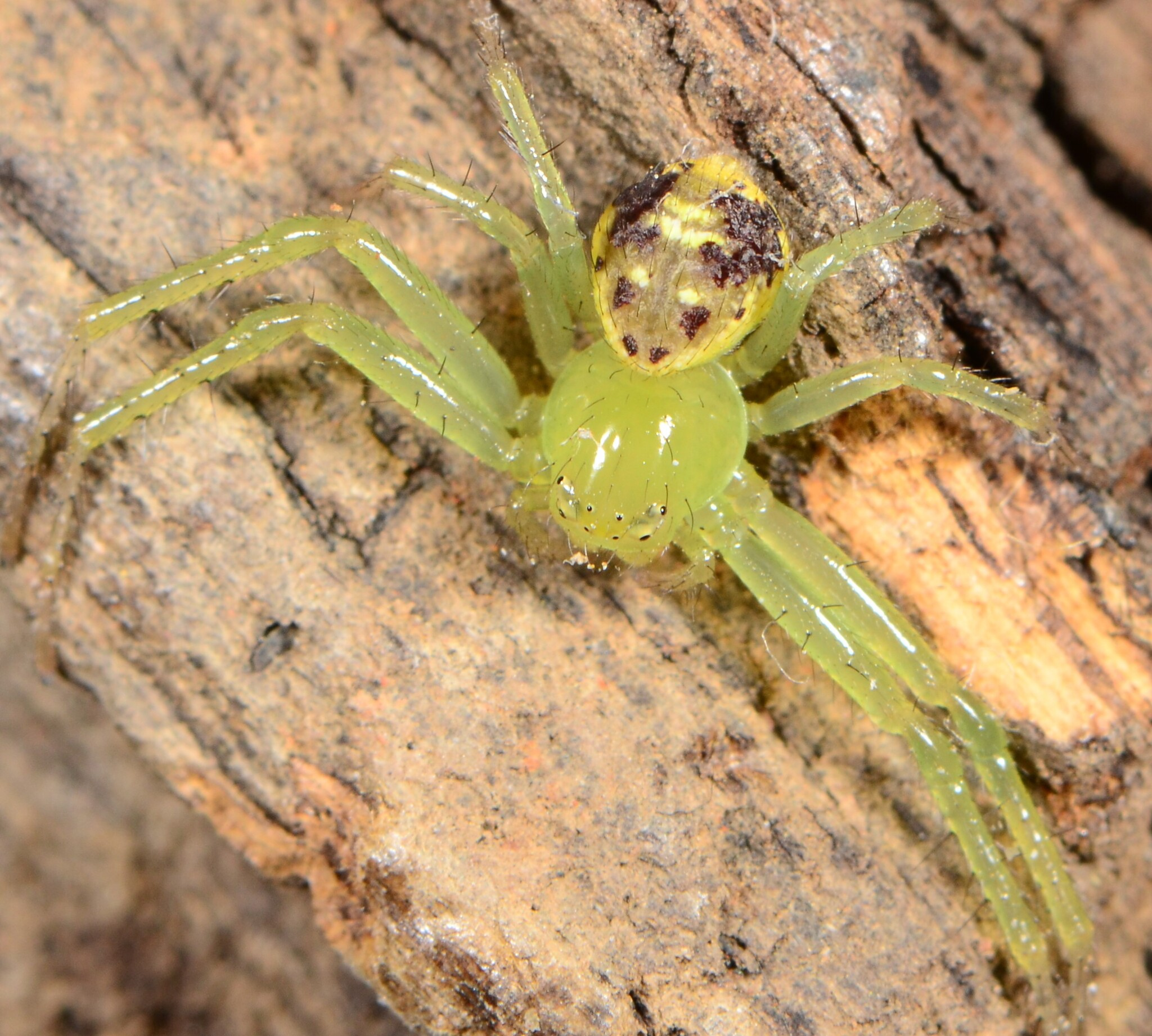
female

Synema langheldi is a small spider with females measuring approximately 4.2 mm in total length and a cephalothorax length of 2 mm. Males remain undescribed.

The overall coloration is entirely yellow except for the dorsal surface of the opisthosoma, which bears distinctive chocolate brown markings. This characteristic pattern gives the species its common name "Spotted African Mask Spider".

The posterior row of eyes is considerably more recurved than the anterior row, with the lateral eyes about 1¼ times as large as the median eyes. The median quadrangle is slightly wider behind than in front and somewhat wider than long, with the four eyes roughly equal in size. The clypeus is slightly less than the length of the median quadrangle.

The carapace bears a few long spines along the anterior margin of the clypeus, laterally to the lateral eyes, and on the posterior part of the carapace. The leg spination formula is complex, with femur I bearing 3 anterior spines and 1 superior spine in the middle, and various combinations of spines on other segments.

== Conservation status ==
Synema langheldi is classified as Least Concern by conservation assessments. Although the species is currently known from only one sex (females), it has a wide geographical range across eastern and southern Africa. The species is under-sampled and expected to occur in more countries than currently documented.

The species has been recorded in six protected areas including Addo Elephant National Park, Tembe Elephant Park, Lhuvhondo Nature Reserve, and Lekgalameetse Nature Reserve. No known threats have been identified, and no specific conservation actions are currently recommended.
