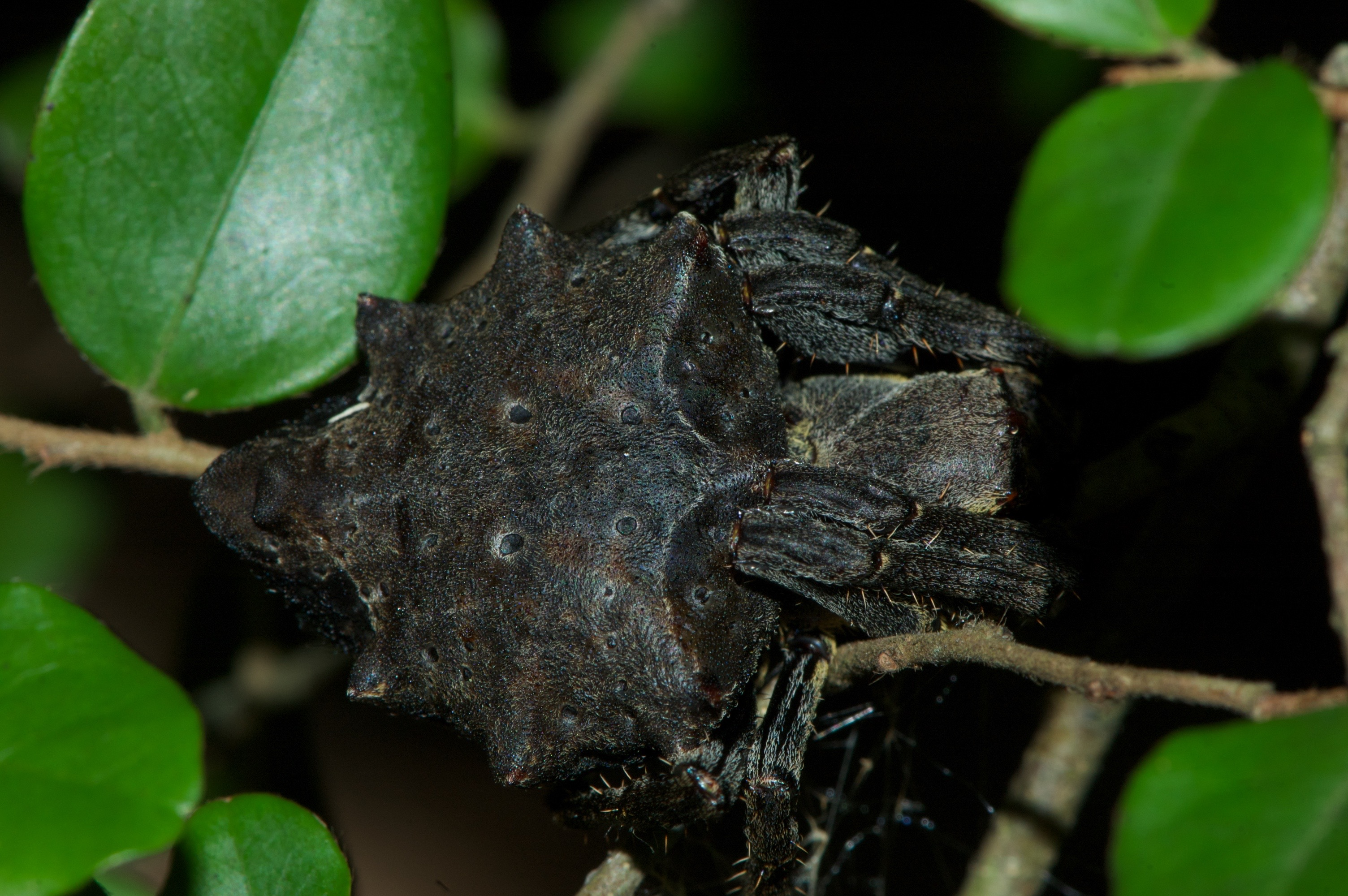
- M. gabonensis, dorsal view
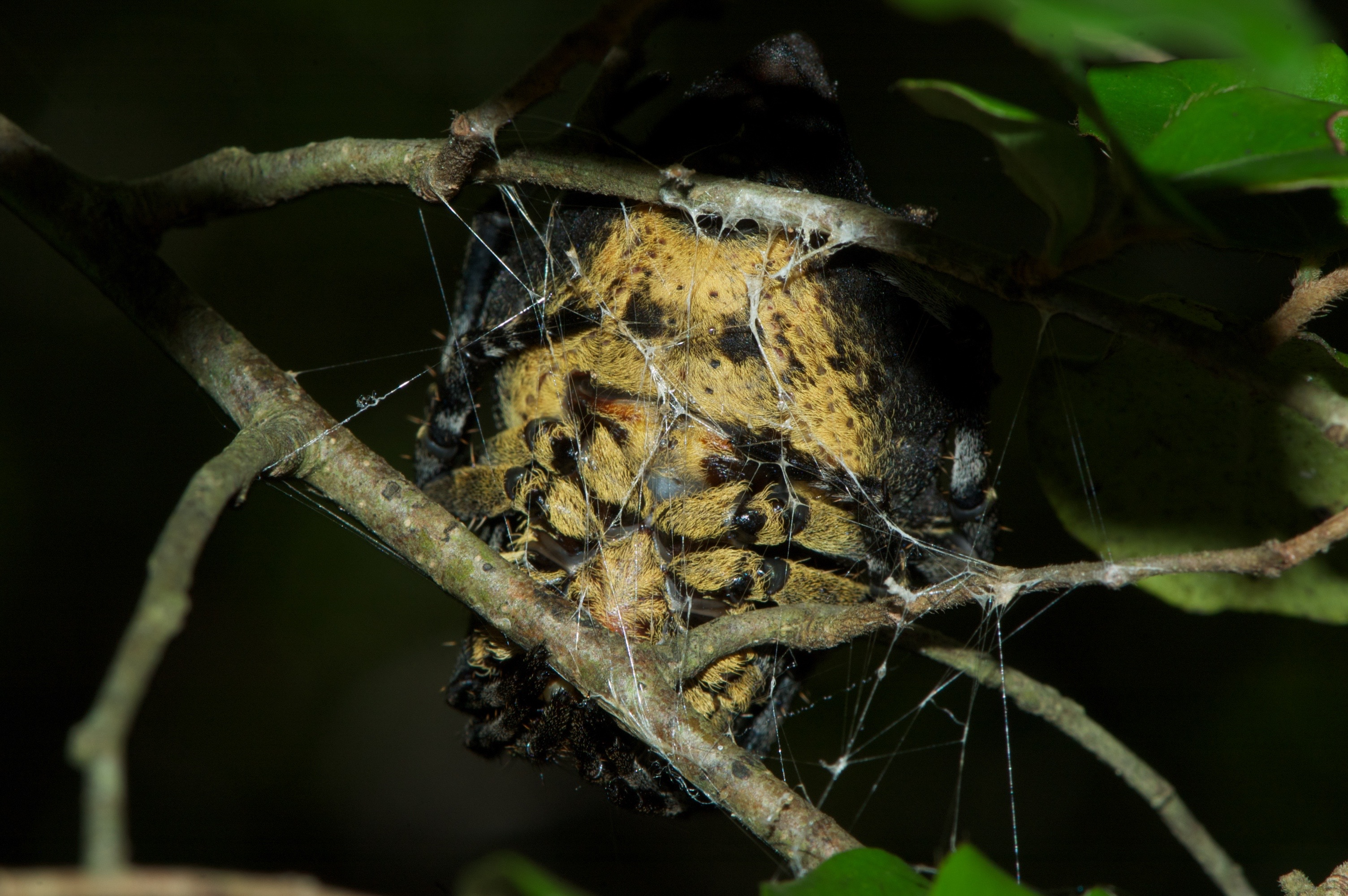
- M. gabonensis, ventral view

Conservation status
- Least Concern (SANBI Red List)

Scientific classification
- Kingdom: Animalia
- Phylum: Arthropoda
- Subphylum: Chelicerata
- Class: Arachnida
- Order: Araneae
- Infraorder: Araneomorphae
- Family: Araneidae
- Genus: Megaraneus; Lawrence, 1968
- Species: M. gabonensis

Binomial name
- Megaraneus gabonensis (Lucas, 1858)

= Megaraneus =

Gabon Megaraneus Orb-Web Spider

Genus of spider

Megaraneus is a genus of African orb-weaver spiders containing the single species, Megaraneus gabonensis. It was first described by R. F. Lawrence in 1968, to contain the single species originally published under the name Epeira gabonensis. It is found across several African countries and is commonly known as the Gabon Megaraneus orb-web spider.

== Distribution ==
Megaraneus gabonensis has been recorded from seven African countries: Angola, Cameroon, Republic of the Congo, Gabon, Sierra Leone, Mozambique, and South Africa.

In South Africa, the species is known only from KwaZulu-Natal province. Notable locations include Dukuduku Forest Station, Lake Sibaya, Tembe Elephant Park, and iSimangaliso Wetland Park.

== Habitat and ecology ==
The species inhabits Forest, Indian Ocean Coastal Belt, and Savanna biomes at altitudes ranging from 51 to 93 m above sea level. Megaraneus gabonensis is an orb-web spider with the web consisting of 25-30 radii with 25 viscid spirals. The free zone is narrow and the hub composed of a small rounded area.

== Description ==
These are large araneids measuring 21-30 mm that bear superficial resemblance to bark spiders. The carapace is blackish brown, sometimes reddish, covered by minute round wart-like tubercles. The sternum is blackish and the ventral surface is covered with golden hair. The abdomen has three pairs of blunt lateral sub-angular tubercles and there are two pairs of large round sigillae and about 50 smaller pit like impressions with variable pattern of yellow markings on a black background. Legs are black with front legs banded and leg I shorter than IV. Sexual dimorphism occurs in size with males resembling females in basic abdominal shape but being very small.

== Conservation ==
Megaraneus gabonensis is listed as Least Concern by the South African National Biodiversity Institute due to its wide geographical range. There are no known threats to the species. The species is protected in three protected areas.

== Taxonomy ==
The species was originally described by Hippolyte Lucas in 1858 from Gabon as Epeira gabonensis. Reginald Frederick Lawrence redescribed the species in 1968. species:Manfred Grasshoff transferred the species from Cyrtophora in 1984, synonymizing Caerostris basilissa and Megaraneus campbelli. Known from both sexes.
