= Madingi Tembe =

Prince of the Tembe Kingdom, father of Makhuza Tembe

Prince Madingi Tembe
- Prince of the Tembe Kingdom (Inland line)
- Reign: c. 1780s - early 1800s
- Predecessor: Himself
- Successor: Prince Makhuza Tembe
- Born: Tembe Kingdom, Maputaland
- Died: Inland Tembe territory, Maputaland
- Issue: Prince Makhuza Tembe
- Dynasty: Tembe-Thonga
- Father: King Mwayi
- Religion: African Traditional Religion

Madingi Tembe was a late 18th-century prince of the Tembe Kingdom and the founder of the inland Tembe royal line from where Prince Makhuza Tembe descended. Prince Madingi governed the inland Tembe territories during the reigns of his father, King Mwayi Tembe and (later) his brother, King Makasana Tembe.

Both Prince Madingi and King Makasana are regarded as the most prominent among the many children of King Mwayi.

== Background ==
Prince Madingi was a senior figure in the inland Tembe royal house during the early nineteenth century. Both he and his brother, King Makasana Tembe, are regarded as the most prominent among the many children of King Mwayi Tembe.

Historically, the Ngubane occupied the inland regions of Maputaland. During the later years of King Mwayi’s reign, Madingi displaced the Ngubane leadership and established direct Tembe royal authority over the interior. He held total control over these territories and maintained this position throughout the reign of his brother, King Makasana Tembe.

Madingi’s autonomous authority later created a parallel inland line of Tembe power. This inland line eventually produced his son, Prince Makhuza Tembe, who succeeded him and later founded the Makhuza-Tembe branch, which asserted autonomy from the main coastal Tembe leadership descended from King Noziyingile Tembe.
