= Tembe Tribal Authority =

Traditional leadership in South Africa

- Tribal council
- Country: South Africa
- Province: KwaZulu-Natal
- District: UMkhanyakude

Government
  - Type: Traditional council
  - Chief of Tembe: Inkosi (Chief) Mabhudu Israel Tembe

The Tembe Tribal Authority (also called KwaNgwanase) is a traditional governance structure of the Tembe people, based in the northern KwaZulu-Natal region of South Africa, near the border with Mozambique. The Tembe are a Tsonga ethnic group whose ancestral territory historically extended from the coastal areas around Delagoa Bay (present-day Maputo Bay) inland toward the lower Lubombo Mountains.

The name for the royal place, KwaNgwanase, refers to Inkosi Ngwanase Tembe, who emerged as a dominant chief within the Tembe lineage during the late nineteenth and early twentieth centuries following a succession dispute with his nephew Prince Makhuza Tembe, who ruled a parallel chiefdom.

The Tembe people were historically powerful throughout the ivory trade period along the southeastern African coast, engaging with Portuguese, Dutch and later British merchants in the 1700s - exchanging ivory and (sometimes slaves) for glass beads, brass and cloth. Wealth from ivory allowed Tembe chiefs to consolidate and cling into regional power and influence neighbouring chiefdoms.

Historical scholarship indicates that the inland Tembe communities, originally administered by Prince Makhuza, were later incorporated under the chiefly jurisdiction of Prince Ngwanase after colonial authorities endorsed Ngwanase as the legitimate Tembe ruler during the succession disputes of 1886–1894, resulting in “the land and people which was originally ruled by Makhuza” being placed under Ngwanase’s authority, the modern Tembe Tribal Authority.

The Tembe Tribal Authority continues the chiefly lineage of the Tembe Kingdom under South Africa’s formal traditional leadership system. The tribal authority administers land, resolves disputes and maintains cultural and social traditions within the Manguzi jurisdiction.

The Tembe Tribal Authority co-established Tembe Elephant Park in partnership with Ezemvelo KZN Wildlife in 1983, providing communal land for the reserve and continuing to act as a key traditional stakeholder in its management and conservation mandate.

== List of Tembe rulers ==
The following is a verified list of Tembe rulers from King Sikuke to current Chief of Tembe.

Name	Reign	Notes
King Sikuke	c.1692-1710	First verifiable Tembe ruler after the genealogical gap
King Ludahumba	1710-1728	Successor to King Sikuke
King Silamboya	1728-1746	Consolidated Tembe authority during early coastal-inland interactions
King Mangobe Tembe	1746-1764	Predecessor to Mabudu; pivotal ruler before the rise of the Mabudu-Tembe branch
King Mabudu	1764-1782	Founder of the Mabudu-Tembe branch; powerful 18th-century ruler
King Mwayi	1782-1800	Successor to Mabudu; father to Makasana and Madingi
King Makasana	1800-1854	Major ruler during early 19th-century upheavals; father of King Noziyingile
King Noziyingile Tembe	1854-1886	Father of Prince Ngwanase; strengthened Tembe polity during colonial encroachment
Queen Zambili Dlamini (Regent)	1886-1894	Regent for Prince Ngwanase following Noziyingile’s death
Chief Ngwanase Tembe	1894-1928	Installed after regency; founder of the modern Ngwanase-Tembe branch
Chief Mhlupeki Tembe	1928-1950	Son of Ngwanase; ruled through early apartheid years
Chief Mzimba Tembe	1951-2000	Son of Mhlupeki; long-serving 20th-century chief
Chief Mabhudu Israel Tembe	2001–present	Current Chief of Tembe, currently leading the Tembe Tribal Authority
