= Zambili Dlamini =

Queen regent of Tembe Kingdom from 1886 to 1894

Queen Zambili
- Born: Zambili Dlamini; Eswatini
- Spouse: King Noziyingile Tembe
- Issue: Chief Ngwanase Tembe
- House: House of Dlamini
- Father: King Sobhuza I
- Occupation: Queen Regent

Zambili Dlamini (also spelt Dzambili) was a Swazi princess who served as Queen regent of the Tembe Kingdom from 1886 until 1894 when her son Prince Ngwanase Tembe came of age and installed as Chief of Tembe.

Zambili was the daughter of King Sobhuza I. Her marriage to King Noziyingile Tembe made the Tembe Kingdom a continuous political ally of the Kingdom of Eswatini under her brother King Mswati II and her royal Swazi lineage granted her legitimacy to give birth to the next heir of the Tembe chieftaincy.

== Regency (1886-1894) and relations with colonial authorities ==
Following the death of her husband King Noziyingile in 1886, Prince Muhena, a senior son of the Tembe, declared himself ruler of the Tembe Kingdom after being militarily aided by King Cetshwayo of the Zulu Kingdom. However, Queen Zambili challenged this and used internal resistant forces to overthrow Muhena and took over to rule from 1886 as regent until Ngwanase came of age in 1894, becoming the Chief of Tembe. Prince Makhuza established the parallel Makhuza-Tembe branch.

During her time as regent, she halted the long-standing tribute historically paid by the Tembe to Zulu kings. She faced considerable internal challenges during her time as regency, including a period when several southern chiefs in the east Lubombo region and north of the Mkhuze River stopped paying tribute to her after her husband King Noziyingile’s death.

Zambili also confronted growing pressure from the Portuguese colonial authorities based in Lourenço Marques. The Portuguese demanded taxes from the Tembe (Maputa) Kingdom, threatening to burn the royal homestead when she refused to pay. Zambili rejected these demands on the basis that the Tembe Kingdom had never historically paid tribute to the Portuguese, and she emphasised that during Noziyingile’s reign, the Portuguese government itself paid tribute to the Tembe for access to Inyaka Island.

Fearing Portuguese and Zulu expansion, Zambili sought diplomatic protection from the British colonial government in Natal colony. She dispatched envoys requesting assistance in a boundary dispute with Portugal and requested that the British crown her son Prince Ngwanase in the same manner they had recognised King Cetshwayo. The British were reluctant of this, as they had regarded as interfering in Portuguese territories. At the end the Portuguese changed their mind and began supporting her regency against Prince Makhuza Tembe and her son Prince Ngwanase was eventually recognised as the legitimate Chief of Tembe. By April 1889, Zambili was recorded by the British as someone who had mended relations with the Portuguese colonial officials; and her homestead was found to have a Portuguese flag hanging outside the main hut.

The legacy of the Tembe Kingdom persists today through the Tembe Tribal Authority, which represents the continuation of the kingdom’s chiefly lineage within South Africa’s modern traditional leadership system, particularly the KwaNgwanase line and the Makhuza line which got incorporated into the modern Tembe Tribal Authority.
