= Maputo River =

River in South Africa, Eswatini, and Mozambique

Coordinates: 26°11′S 32°42′E

Maputo River Great Usutu, Lusutfu or Suthu
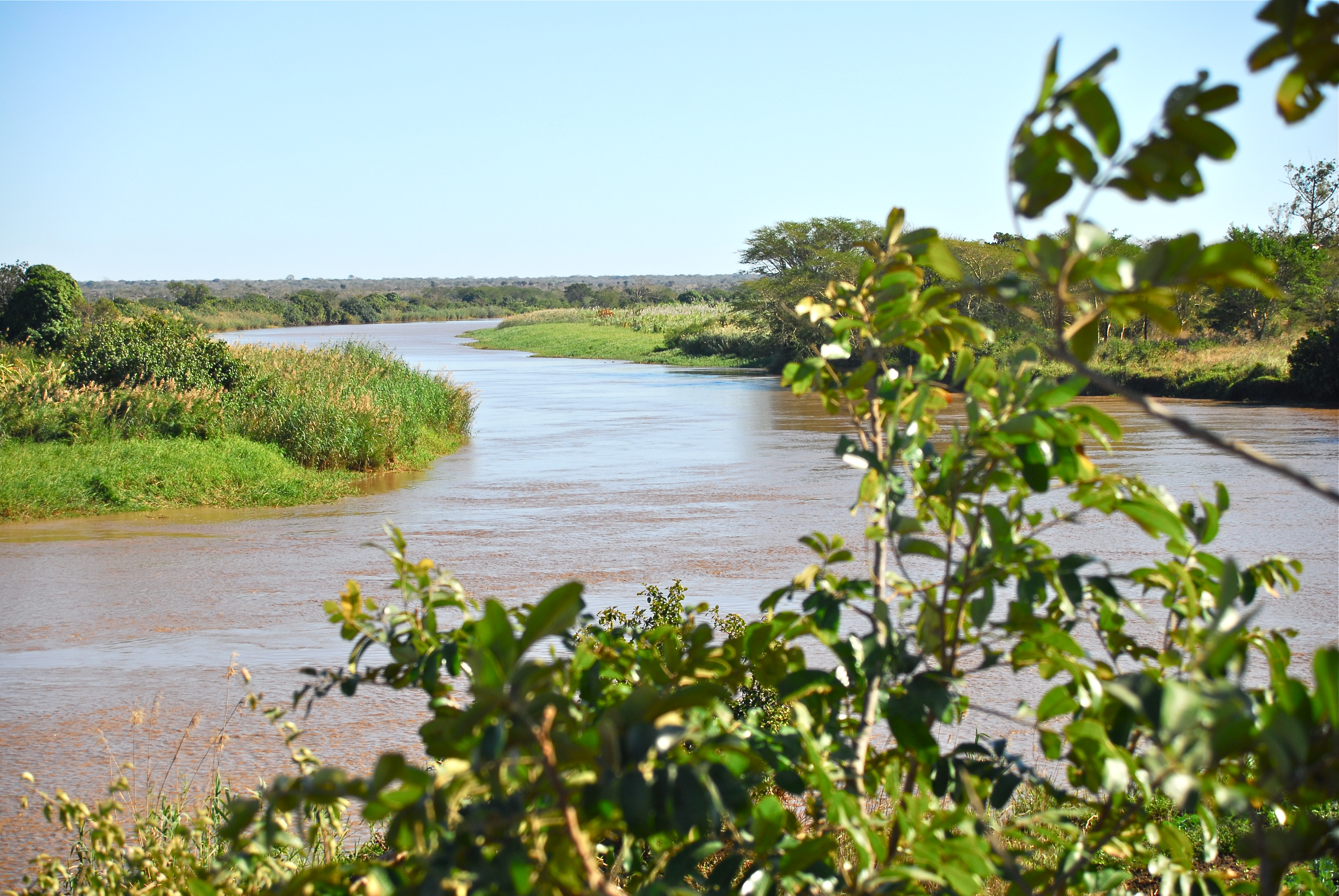
- Maputo River in Mozambique

- Location of the Maputo River's mouth

Location
- Countries: South Africa; Eswatini; Mozambique

Physical characteristics
- Source
  - location: Amsterdam, Mpumalanga, South Africa
- Mouth: Indian Ocean
  - location: Maputo Province, Mozambique
- Basin size: 29,970 km^{2} (11,570 sq mi)

The Maputo River (Portuguese: Rio Maputo), also called Great Usutu River, Lusutfu River, or Suthu River, is a river in South Africa, Eswatini, and Mozambique. The name Suthu refers to Basotho people who lived near the source of the river, but were attacked and displaced by the Swazis. It is also said to mean 'dark brown', a description of the river's muddy water. Meanwhile the name Maputo refers to King Mabudu Tembe, who reigned during the XVIII century at that region.

== Course ==
The river rises near Amsterdam, Mpumalanga, South Africa, and flows easterly through Eswatini, where it enters the Lebombo Mountains. The 13 km gorge forms the boundary between Eswatini and South Africa. For approximately twenty kilometres, it forms the border between South Africa (province of KwaZulu-Natal) and Mozambique. There, in the Ndumo Game Reserve, it absorbs its largest tributary, the Pongola River. It then meanders through the Mozambican coastal plain and empties into southern Maputo Bay, some 85 kilometres downstream.

In Eswatini, the river is called the Great Usutu or Lusutfu and flows through the towns of Bhunya, Luyengo, Siphofaneni, and Big Bend. The town of Big Bend is near a point in which the river meanders abruptly. The Great Usutu is the largest river in Eswatini, it is the site of Eswatini's lowest point (21 m above sea level), and is known for whitewater rafting. No large towns have been able to form along its banks because of deep narrow valleys and dense forests. It is, however, home to some golf courses, hotels, and nature reserves.

== Tributaries ==
From the origin to its mouth, in order, tributaries are the: Sihanahana, Bonnie Brook, Mpuluzi, Buhlungu, Umvenvane, Lusushwana, Sidvokodvo, Mkhondvo, Mhlamani, Mzimneni, Mzimphofu, Mhlathuzane, Mtsindzekwa, Nyetane, Funuane, and the Pongola Rivers.

== Dams on this river ==
- Westoe Dam
- Lubovane Dam

== See also ==
- List of rivers of South Africa
