= Mangobe Tembe =

King of Tembe Kingdom c.1746–1750s or 1760s

- King of the Tembe
- Reign: c.1746-1750s or 1760s
- Predecessor: Madomadoma (Nkalanki) (disputed)
- Successor: King Nkupo II; King Mabudu
- Died: 1750s or 1760s
- Burial: Matutwini
- Spouse: Mitshandlwane
- Issue: Nkupo II; Mbhanyele; Mabudu; Ndumo
- House: Tembe
- Father: King Silamboya
- Religion: Traditional African religion

Mangobe Tembe was an 18th-century king of the Tembe people. He was the father of King Nkupo II and King Mabudu Tembe.

His reign marked the political and military peak of the Tembe Kingdom, which extended from the Indian Ocean to the Lebombo Mountains and southward into present-day KwaZulu Natal, the historic Maputaland-Lubombo region, and Mangobe is regarded by historians as the last king to rule over a united Tembe kingdom in the region before its fragmentation into wrangling royal factions after his death.

== Lineage and reign ==
Various historical traditions identify figures such as Sikuke, Ludahumba, Silamboya and Mangobe as founding ancestors of the Tembe family.

Other sources suggest that Mangobe was a son of King Silamboya and a younger brother of King Mwayi I. After Mwayi I's death, Mangobe acted as regent for his nephew Prince Madomadoma (also known as Nkalanki), who was still a minor at the time.

During this era, Mangobe emerged as a prominent political and military leader among the Tembe. Mangobe approached Dutch officials at Delagoa Bay (Maputo) seeking firearms in exchange for military assistance and this request was declined. He began leading successful military campaigns against neighbouring chiefdoms, including the Maxavane and the Nyaka, while crossing the Maputo River in the 1700s and continued to expand Tembe territory southward.

During his reign, the kingdom expanded from Maputo Bay to the Mfolozi River and the Mkhuze River, becoming the largest and most powerful polity in southeastern Africa during the 18th century.

Madomadoma reportedly came and formally assumed the kingship and forced Mangobe into temporary exile. However, Mangobe later returned with military force and by the mid-1700s Mangobe's forces had displaced Madomadoma and established himself as the effective ruler of the Tembe kingdom.

Mangobe established his capital near present-day Madubula in the Matutwini region, where he is traditionally believed to be buried. He appointed his sons as governors of strategic land:

- Crown Prince Nkupo II governed the territory near Maputo Bay
- Prince Mbhanyele was responsible for the Matutwini region
- Prince Mabudu was responsible for the territories east of the Maputo River
- Prince Ndumo, looked after the region near the confluence of the Pongola River and Usuthu River

Mangobe established trade networks with coastal traders and inland chiefdoms, trading with Europeans at Delagoa Bay, particularly the Dutch and Portuguese.

== Death and succession ==
Following his death after the middle of the 18th century, (Note: Mangobe's year of death is not known but is dated by various authorities at different points between 1754 and 1765, as summarised by Mathebula.) Mangobe was succeeded by his son, Prince Nkupo II. However, Prince Mabudu soon emerged as the more capable and charismatic leader and succeeded in displacing his elder brother Nkupo II, taking the chieftainship for himself.
