= Mabudu Tembe =

King of the Tembe Kingdom from c.1764 to 1782

- King of the Tembe Kingdom
- Reign: 1764-1782
- Predecessor: King Mangobe Tembe
- Successor: King Mwayi Tembe
- Born: Maputaland, Southern African
- Died: 1782; Maputaland
- Issue: Prince Mwayi Tembe
- Dynasty: Tembe-Thonga
- Father: King Mangobe Tembe
- Religion: African Traditional Religion

King Mabudu Tembe (reigned from c.1764 to 1782) was a prominent 18th-century military ruler of the Tembe Kingdom in the region historically known as Maputaland in northern KwaZulu-Natal and southern Mozambique. He was the third son of King Mangobe Tembe.

King Mabudu established the Mabudu-Tembe branch of the Tembe royal lineage after forcefully taking power from his elder brother, King Nkupo II and went on to consolidate Tembe authority in the late-18th century. He is widely regarded as one of the most powerful leaders of the Tembe people and the founder of the influential Mabudu-Tembe branch of the royal line, from which later Tembe chiefs, including King Noziyingile Tembe, descended.

Under his rule, the Tembe Kingdom consolidated influential political power along the southeast African coast in Maputaland-Lubombo region, benefitting from the lucrative ivory trade with Portuguese, Dutch and early British merchants operating out of Delagoa Bay. Ivory, rhinoceros horn and occasionally enslaved people were exchanged for European beads, cloth and brass, which significantly increased the wealth and regional influence of the Tembe ruling house.

Anthropologist David Webster notes that both the city of Maputo in Mozambique and Maputa (Maputaland) in northern KwaZulu-Natal derive their names from King Mabudu, named by European authorities who could not pronounce 'Mabudu'. A British Navy captain first documented Maputaland as ‘Mapoota’ in 1822.

A 1900s James Stuart informant said the Tembe people preferred to call themselves AbakwaMabudu, meaning 'the people of King Mabudu Tembe', than being called "Tsonga people".
