= Tembe Elephant Park =

Game reserve in Maputaland, KwaZulu-Natal, South Africa

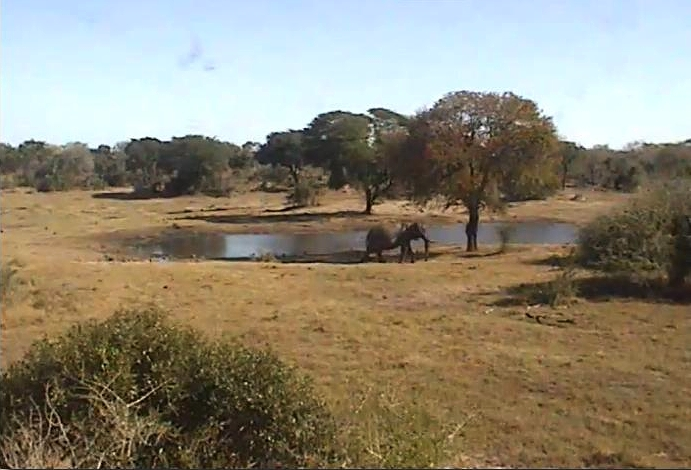
- Tembe Elephant Park, October 2013

- Location within KwaZulu-Natal
- Location: KwaZulu-Natal, South Africa
- Nearest city: Durban, South Africa
- Coordinates: 27°02′55″S 32°25′20″E
- Area: 300.12 km^{2} (115.88 sq mi)
- Established: 1983
- Governing body: Ezemvelo KZN Wildlife

Tembe Elephant Park is a 300.12 km^{2} (115.88 sq mi) game reserve in Maputaland, KwaZulu-Natal, South Africa. It is adjacent to Ndumo Game Reserve.

It is situated near the town of KwaNgwanase (also known as Ngwanase) and lies within the traditional territory of the Tembe people, often referred to as Emanguzi, which includes the historical settlement areas around KwaNgwanase and Manguzi.

The park was developed by Tembe Tribal Authority and Ezemvelo KZN Wildlife.

It was established in 1983 to protect African savanna elephants, which used to migrate between Maputaland and southern Mozambique. These elephants were traumatised by poaching during the Mozambican civil war, so the park was only opened to the public in 1991. The park is now home to 250 elephants, which are the largest in the world. Isilo, the largest living tusker in the southern hemisphere, died in 2014.

200 more elephants, formerly of the same group, live in the Maputo Elephant Reserve in Mozambique. The Lubombo Transfrontier Conservation Area is planned to link the two reserves and the Lubombo Conservancy in Eswatini in a single transfrontier reserve.

More than 340 bird species have been recorded in Tembe, including the rare Rudd's apalis, the rufous-bellied heron, the Swamp nightjar and the Woodwards's batis.

This park is to be included into the Usuthu-Tembe-Futi Transfrontier Conservation Area.
