= KwaNgwanase =

Manguzi Kosi Bay Town
- Location within KwaZulu-Natal Location within South Africa
- Coordinates: 26.996°S 32.752°E
- Country: South Africa
- Province: KwaZulu-Natal
- District: uMkhanyakude
- Municipality: uMhlabuyalingana
- Main Place: Manguzi

Area
  - Total: 5.64 km^{2} (2.18 sq mi)
- Elevation: 61 m (200 ft)

Population (2011)
  - Total: 5,534
  - Density: 981/km^{2} (2,540/sq mi)

Racial makeup (2011)
  - Black African: 98.2%
  - Coloured: 0.3%
  - Indian/Asian: 0.4%
  - White: 0.4%
  - Other: 0.8%

First languages (2011)
  - Zulu: 90.8%
  - English: 4.2%
  - Tsonga: 1.4%
  - Other: 3.6%
- Time zone: UTC+2 (SAST)

kwaNgwanase, also known as Kosi Bay Town, is a small town in Umkhanyakude District Municipality in the KwaZulu-Natal province of South Africa. It is located some 15 km south of the Mozambique–South Africa border, and is situated near Kosi Bay.

KwaNgwanase is located within the traditional territory of the Tembe people, known as EManguzi, which represents the historical homeland of the Tembe.

The town serves as an administrative and commercial hub for the Tembe Tribal Authority and is associated with the Ngwanase Tembe royal household. The area developed as the central settlement for the Tembe people after their migration from the Tembe Kingdom region near Delagoa Bay (now Maputo Bay, Mozambique) during the 18th century.

== Geography ==
The town lies at the edge of the coastal lowlands near Kosi Bay and the foothills of the Lubombo Mountains. It is connected by road to other major towns in KwaZulu-Natal and serves as a gateway for visitors to the surrounding nature reserves and Tembe cultural areas. The town is also located near the Tembe Elephant Park, a protected area known for its population of African elephants and other wildlife, attracting eco-tourism to the region.

== Communications ==
The Manguzi Wireless Internet is a project that provides Internet access, e-mail and learning resources to schools where no telecommunications infrastructure exists utilising a unique combination of radio and satellite broadcasting technologies.

== Healthcare ==
Manguzi Hospital, founded by the Methodist Church in 1948, is a 280-bed District (level 1) hospital, managed by the KwaZulu-Natal Department of Health.
