= Noziyingile Tembe =

- King of the Tembe Kingdom
- Reign: c.1854–1886
- Predecessor: King Makasana
- Successor: Chief Ngwanase Tembe
- Died: c.1886 Maputaland, KwaZulu Natal, South Africa
- Spouse: Queen Zambili Dlamini
- Issue: Ngwanase Tembe
- House: Tembe Tribal Authority
- Father: King Makasana

Noziyingile Tembe was a king of the Tembe Kingdom from c.1854 to 1886. He was the father of Chief Ngwanase with Queen Zambili Dlamini.

He descended from the House of Mabudu-Tembe, which traced its ancestry to King Mabudu Tembe, a late 18th-century military ruler who controlled large parts of the coastal and inland regions of Maputaland.
