= Kosi Bay =

Group of lakes in Maputaland, KwaZulu-Natal, South Africa

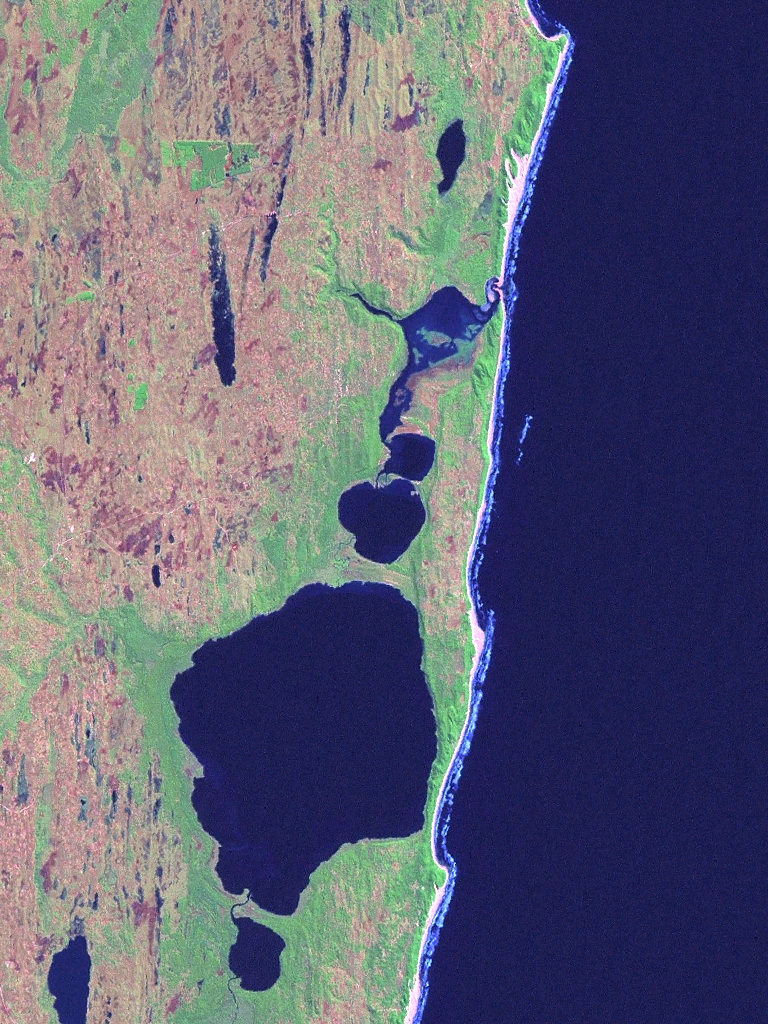

- Location within KwaZulu-Natal
- Location: KwaZulu-Natal, South Africa
- Nearest city: Maputo (across border), then Richards Bay, South Africa
- Coordinates: 27°0′0″S 32°50′0″E
- Governing body: Ezemvelo KZN Wildlife

Ramsar Wetland
- Designated: 28 June 1991
- Reference no.: 527

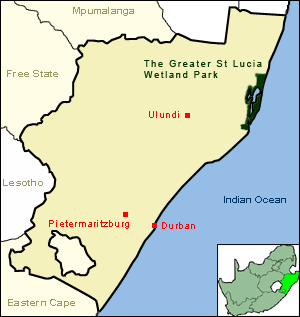
Greater St. Lucia Wetland Park

Kosi Bay is a series of four interlinked lakes in the Maputaland area of KwaZulu-Natal, South Africa.

== Ecology ==
The lakes form part of the iSimangaliso Wetland Park, a UNESCO World Heritage Site. The closest town is Manguzi, some 13 kilometres (8.1 mi) away from it. Kosi Bay estuary is only 2 kilometres (1.2 mi) from the Mozambique border. It is possible to walk from the estuary to Ponta do Ouro in only an hour or so. It is one of the quietest beaches in South Africa. The Kosi River Mouth is known as "the aquarium" because of the clarity of the water and the abundance of fish species.

Bird species in the area include the palm-nut vulture, Pel's fishing owl, white-backed night-heron, and kingfishers. Duiker, hippopotamus, crocodiles and bull sharks are also present, and loggerhead and endangered leatherback sea turtles lay their eggs on the beach. The Bay is noted for its aggressive bull shark population. The sharks are locally known as zambesi. Whale sharks and manta rays also visit the area. Whale watching to target mainly humpback whales and dolphins is a growing industry in Kosi Bay region.

The Kosi palm has the largest leaf of any plant. Endemic species include the Kosi cycad and Kosi fern. It is one of very few places on earth where five different species of mangrove trees are found in one area.

== History ==
Kosi Bay is the cultural capital of the ancient Thonga Tembe kingdom. This is the original and natural home of the Thonga people and their fish traps. The history of AmaThonga people on this land dates back some 1000 years. Kosi Bay and Maputo Bay can be considered one land-area, traditionally belonging to the Africans. Kosi Bay was also known as Tembeland or Thongaland, but the name fell into disuse in early 1900s. When Britain colonised South Africa, Kosi Bay was annexed to Natal, while Maputo was annexed to Mozambique.

Fish trap

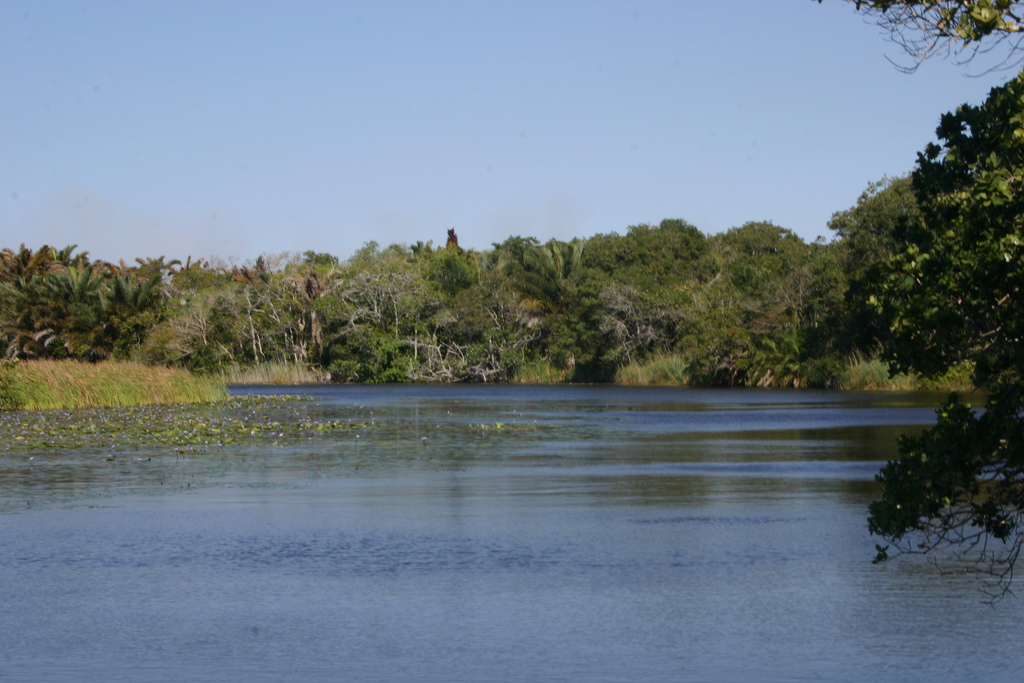

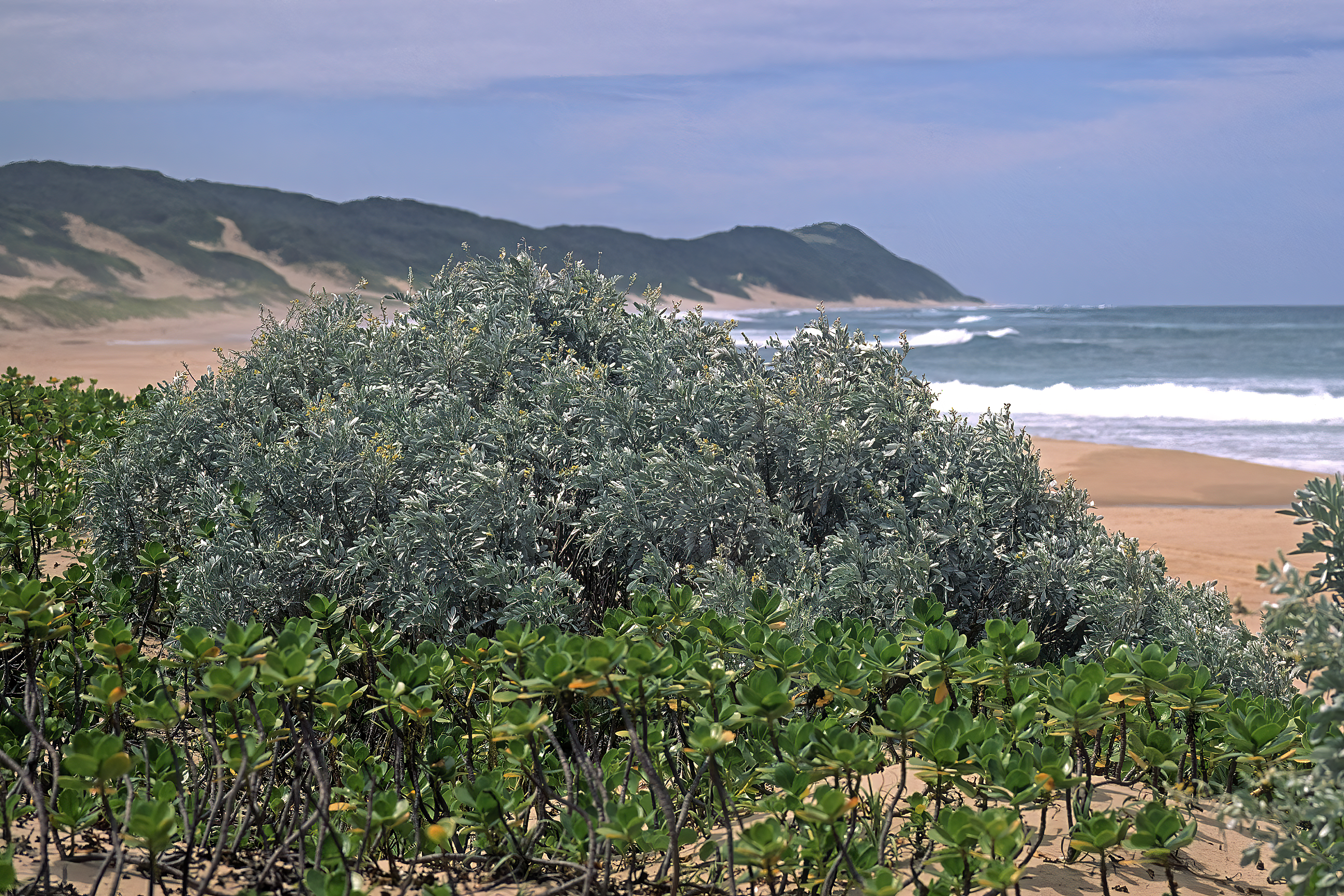
Sophora inhambanensis on Black Rock beach

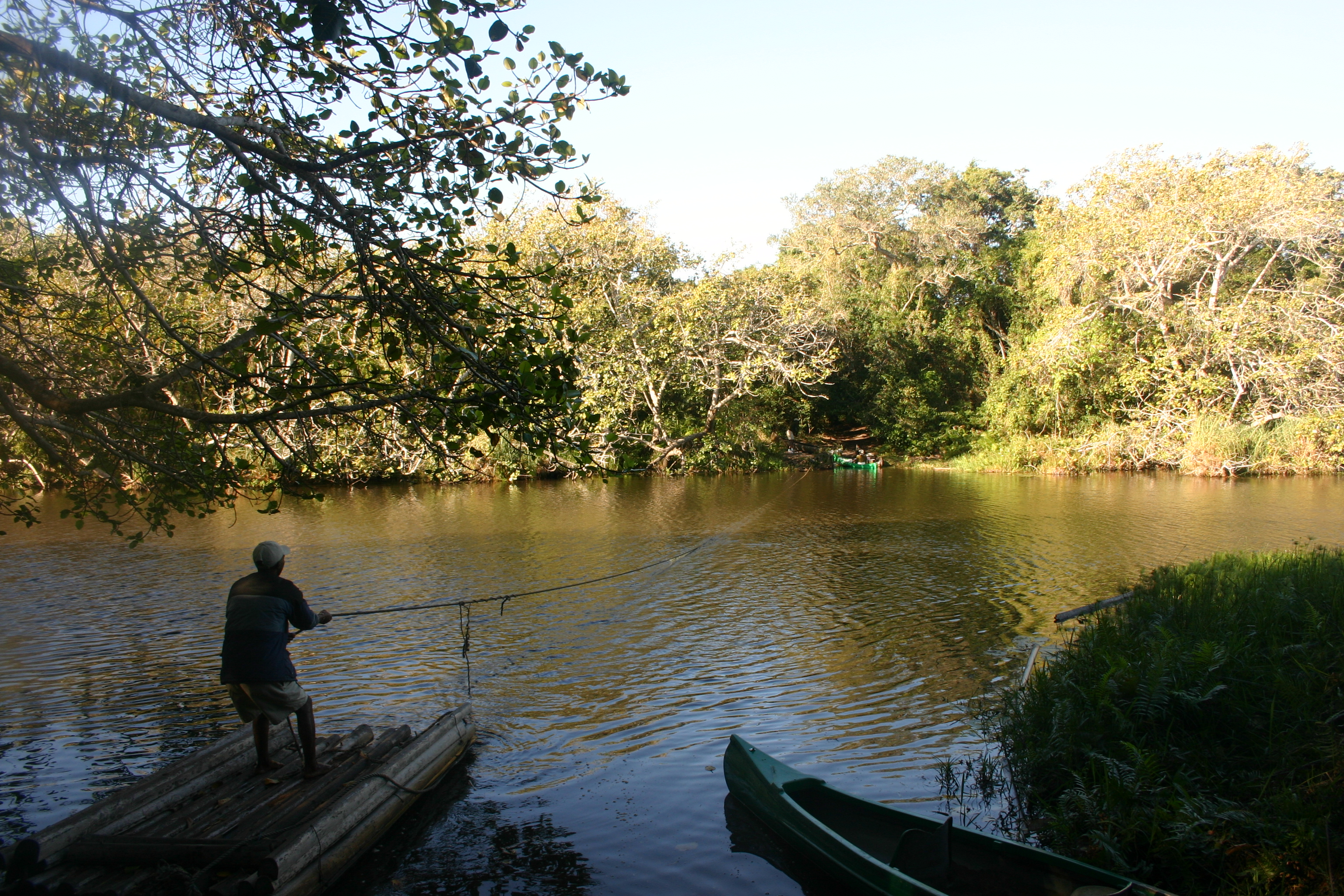
Pont Ferry
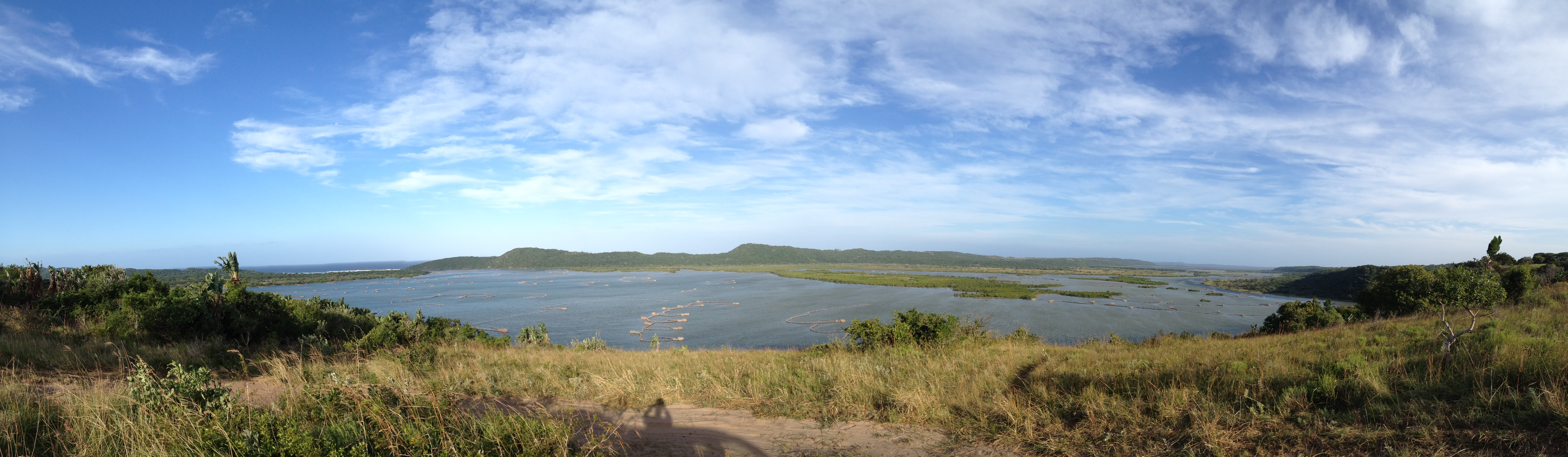
Kosi Bay lakes with fish traps

== Tourism ==
Several tourism operators offer experiences in the area, including guided or self-sustained hikes along trails that offer the opportunity to experience the ecosystem up close, walking across sand dunes, along pristine beaches and through coastal forest.
