= Maputaland =

Natural region in South Africa in northern KwaZulu-Natal

- Natural region
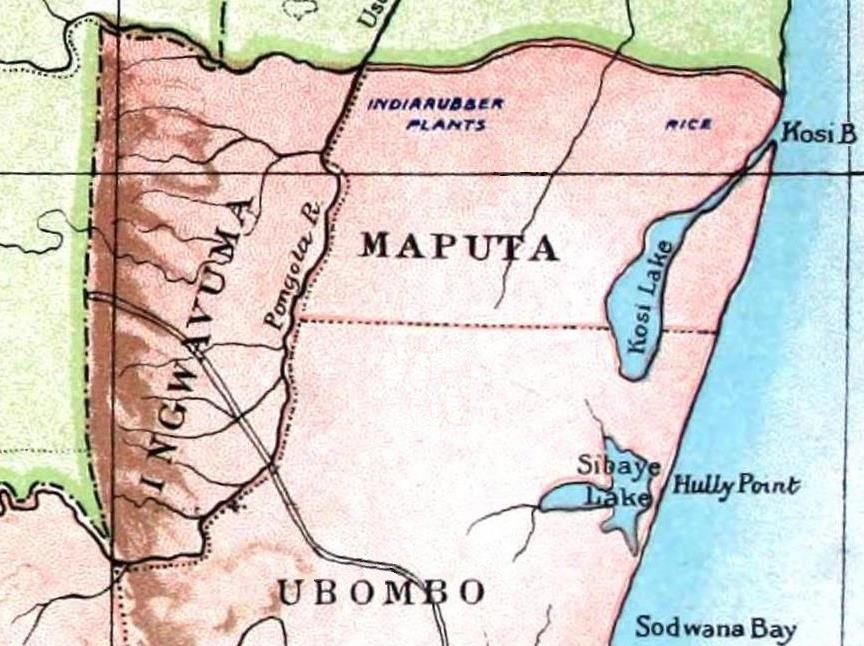
- The former Maputa county of Natal (1911 map)

- Location within South Africa
- Coordinates: 26°59′S 32°30′E
- Country: South Africa

Maputaland is a natural region of Southern Africa. It is located in the northern part of the province of KwaZulu-Natal, South Africa between Eswatini and the coast. In a wider sense it may also include the southernmost region of Mozambique. The bird routes and coral reefs off the coast are major tourist attractions.

Now the name of this traditional region is being revived for the Maputaland-Pondoland bushland and thickets, one of the ecoregions of South Africa, as well as for the Maputaland-Pondoland-Albany Hotspot.

== Geography ==
Maputaland is bordered by the Ubombo Mountains in the west and the Indian Ocean in the east. It covers an area of about 10,000 km^{2}, stretching approximately from the town of Hluhluwe and the northern section of Lake St. Lucia to the border of Mozambique and South Africa, or beyond to Maputo in Mozambique.

== History and people ==
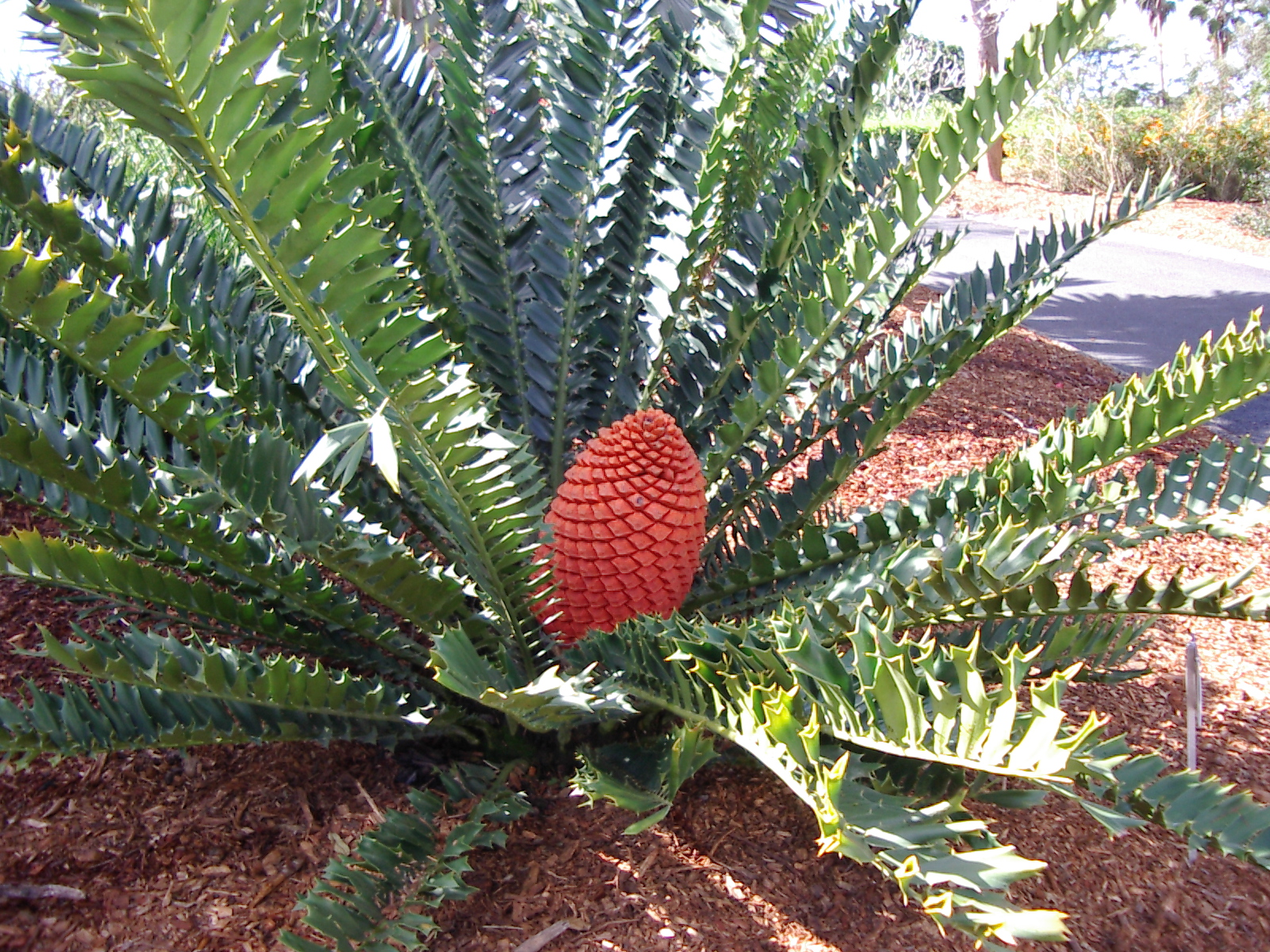
A Maputaland cycad

Maputaland has historically been inhabited by the Tembe and related Nguni-speaking groups like Nyaka and Emalangeni. The Tembe established the Tembe Kingdom in the coastal lowlands between present-day southern Mozambique and northeastern KwaZulu-Natal, with centers around KwaNgwanase (named after Chief Ngwanase Tembe) and the surrounding areas of Kosi Bay in the 17th century.

In the modern era, the chiefly lineage continues under the Tembe Tribal Authority, while part of the historical Tembe territory is protected within Tembe Elephant Park.

== Tongaland ==
The South African section of Maputaland was also previously known as Tongaland after the Tonga people who live there. The usually flat region feeds the Phongolo and Mkhuze River. On 11 June 1895, Tongaland was annexed by Great Britain.

'Tongaland', the name of the traditional region of the Tsonga, has now largely fallen into disuse. It is still occasionally found in scientific works though, as well as in the naming of species, such as the Tongaland cannibal snail (Natalina wesseliana).

== See also ==
- Maputaland-Lubombo region
- Maputaland-Pondoland bushland and thickets – Montane shrubland ecoregion in South Africa
- Maputaland-Pondoland-Albany Hotspot – Southern Africa biodiversity hotspot
- Maputaland coastal forest mosaic – Subtropical moist broadleaf forest ecoregion on the east coast of southern Africa
- Sibhayi – Lake in KwaZulu-Natal, South Africa

== Bibliography ==
- Elephant Coast Visitor Guide, (2007/8).
- Pooley, E. (1993). The Complete Field Guide to Trees of Natal, Zululand and Transkei. ISBN 0-620-17697-0
