= Tembe-Thonga =

Vatsonga / Mathonga

Regions with significant populations
- Northern KwaZulu Natal (South Africa); Southern Mozambique

Languages
- Xitsonga (Tsonga dialects); Other Nguni influences like Swazi language

Religion
- Predominantly Christianity; Traditional African religion

Related ethnic groups
- Tsonga people; Chopi people; Embo-Dlamini, Nguni people

The Tembe-Thonga people (also known as Vatsonga or Mathonga) are a Southern African Bantu ethnic group primarily inhabiting northern KwaZulu Natal in South Africa and southern Mozambique. They are part of the broader Tsonga-Nguni cultural and linguistic family that inhabited the Southern African region of Maputaland-Lubombo since the Bantu expansion era.
