= List of royal marriages to commoners =

Royal marriages to commoners have historically been uncommon, due to traditions of members of royal families, especially high-level ones, only marrying other persons considered to be royalty, sometimes with penalties for royals who married far below their rank, deemed morganatic marriage. Often, alliances could be created between countries or strengthened within a country through intermarriage of two royal families. On the other hand, occasionally a member of a royal family married a commoner simply due to romantic feelings or physical attraction, and possibly to endear themselves to the general population by establishing that sense of connection. This trend has accelerated and become more accepted in modern times.

Some of the individuals in the lists below are members of deposed royal dynasties and not of reigning royal families.

== Before Common Era (Before Christ) ==
- Pharaoh Amenhotep III and Tiye (14th century BC)
- King David and Bathsheba, 11th century BC
- King Ahasuerus and Esther, 5th century BC

== Early modern ==
- 1356: King Casimir III the Great of Poland and Krystyna Rokiczana, widow of a merchant, as his third wife.
- January 1557: Ferdinand II, Archduke of Austria and Philippine Welser, daughter of a merchant. After her death, he married dynastically to Anna Juliana Gonzaga and fathered Anna of Tyrol, Holy Roman Empress.
- 4 July 1568: King Eric XIV of Sweden and Karin Månsdotter, daughter of a prison guard. He was deposed within a year.
- 1698: Leopold I, Prince of Anhalt-Dessau and Anna Luise Föhse
- 1707: Tsar Peter the Great of Russia and Marta Skowrońska, who was born a peasant, but ended up succeeding her husband as Catherine I of Russia. They are the ancestors of the Russian Imperial Family.
- 1794: Lucien Bonaparte, Prince of Canino and Musignano and Christine Boyer
- 1 August 1794: Prince Joseph Bonaparte and Julie Clary

== 19th century ==
- 24 December 1803: Prince Jérôme Bonaparte and Elizabeth Patterson
- 3 September 1823: Archduke John of Austria and Anna Plochl, daughter of a postmaster. Their romance was immortalized in the 1929 Austrian film Archduke John
- November 1829: Prince Jérôme Napoléon Bonaparte and Susan May Williams
- 28 December 1833 Maria Christina of the Two Sicilies, Queen Dowager of Spain, and her bodyguard Agustín Fernando Muñoz. On 23 June 1844 he was created Duke of Riánsares by her daughter Queen Isabella II of Spain
- 5 April 1836: Charles Ferdinand of the Two Sicilies, Prince of Capua and Penelope Smyth, at Gretna Green
- 8 January 1847: Prince George, Duke of Cambridge and actress Sarah Fairbrother, in contravention of the Royal Marriages Act 1772
- 4 June 1848: Infanta Josefina Fernanda of Spain and writer José Güell y Renté
- 20 April 1850: Prince Adalbert of Prussia and dancer Therese Elssler
- 7 August 1850: King Frederick VII of Denmark and dancer/actress Louise Rasmussen as his third wife
- 1852: Prince Pierre Napoléon Bonaparte and Éléonore-Justine Ruflin
- 28 May 1859: Duke Ludwig Wilhelm in Bavaria and actress Henriette Mendel
- 21 August 1860: Duke Ernest of Württemberg and actress/singer Natalie Eischborn
- 4 February 1868: Archduke Heinrich Anton of Austria and singer Leopoldine Hofmann
- 14 November 1868: Prince August of Württemberg and Marie Bethge
- 10 June 1869: King Ferdinand II of Portugal and Swiss-German soprano as his second wife Elise Hensler, created Countess of Edla
- 18 October 1869: King Victor Emmanuel II of Italy and Rosa Vercellana as his second wife, daughter of an Officer in the King's Guards
- 1 September 1875: Prince Charles Joseph Bonaparte and Ellen Channing Day
- 1880: Prince Roland Bonaparte and Marie-Félix Blanc
- 1882: Grand Duke Nicholas Konstantinovich of Russia and Nadezhda Alexandrovna Dreyer, daughter of the Orenburg police chief
- 30 October 1889: Albert I, Prince of Monaco and American heiress Alice Heine as his second wife
- 1889: Archduke John Salvator of Austria and dancer Ludmilla Stubel. They disappeared the following year off the coast of Cape Horn

== 20th century ==
- 27 January 1903: Archduke Leopold Ferdinand of Austria and prostitute Wilhelmine Adamovicz
- 25 September 1907: Archduchess Louise of Austria, former Crown Princess of Saxony, and musician Enrico Toselli
- 15 August 1909: Archduke Ferdinand Karl of Austria and Bertha Czuber, daughter of Austrian mathematician Emanuel Czuber
- 9 January 1913: Archduchess Eleonora of Austria and sailor Alfons von Kloss
- 16 November 1916: Grand Duchess Olga Alexandrovna of Russia and Russian officer Nikolai Kulikovsky
- 26 September 1917: Afonso, Duke of Porto (after the 5 October 1910 revolution to overthrow the Portuguese monarchy) and American heiress Nevada Stoody Hayes
- 1 February 1920: Prince Christopher of Greece and Denmark and American heiress Nancy Stewart Worthington Leeds
- 30 January 1921: Grand Duke Andrei Vladimirovich of Russia and Mathilde Kschessinska
- 24 June 1921: Princess Marie-Louise of Madagascar and André Bossard
- 23 November 1922: Princess Dagmar of Denmark and Jørgen Castenskjold, son of the Court Chamberlain
- 11 February 1924: Prince Erik of Denmark and Canadian Lois Booth
- 10 June 1924: Prince Viggo of Denmark and American Eleanor Margaret Green
- 7 November 1931: Prince Nicolae of Romania and Ioana Dumitrescu-Doletti
- 11 March 1932: Prince Lennart of Sweden and Karin Nissvandt
- 8 March 1934: Prince Sigvard of Sweden and Erica Maria Patzek
- 3 June 1937: Prince Edward, Duke of Windsor (formerly King Edward VIII) and American socialite Wallis Simpson
- 21 September 1942: Prince Andrei Alexandrovich of Russia and British aristocrat Nadine Sylvia Ada McDougall
- 19 February 1946: Prince Carl Johan of Sweden and journalist Kerstin Wijkmark
- 24 July 1946: Louis II, Prince of Monaco and actress Ghislaine Dommanget
- 21 April 1947: Princess Katherine of Greece and Denmark and English army officer Major Richard Brandram
- 12 August 1947: Tsar Ferdinand I of Bulgaria and Alžbeta Brezáková
- 4 February 1948: Prince Oluf of Denmark and Dorrit Puggard-Müller
- 24 May 1949: Prince Flemming of Denmark and Alice Ruth Nielsen
- 27 May 1949 Prince Aly Khan and actress Rita Hayworth
- 4 December 1951: Princess Antoinette of Monaco and tennis champion Alexandre-Athenase Noghès
- 10 October 1952: Atsuko, Princess Yori of Japan and aristocrat Takamasa Ikeda
- 15 May 1953: Princess Ragnhild of Norway and shipowner Erling Lorentzen
- 5 March 1955: Norodom Sihanouk of Cambodia and Paule-Monique Izzi
- 18 April 1956: Rainier III, Prince of Monaco and American actress Grace Kelly
- 10 April 1959: Akihito, Crown Prince of Japan and Michiko Shōda
- 20 December 1959: Emperor Mohammed Reza I of Iran and Farah Diba
- 3 March 1960: Takako, Princess Suga of Japan and aristocrat Hisanaga Shimazu
- 6 May 1960: Princess Margaret of the United Kingdom and photographer Antony Armstrong-Jones
- 12 January 1961: Princess Astrid of Norway and sailor Johan Ferner
- 21 January 1961: Princess Elizabeth of Yugoslavia and American businessman Howard Oxenberg
- 25 May 1961: King Hussein of Jordan and English assistant secretary Toni Gardiner
- 8 June 1961: Prince Edward, Duke of Kent and aristocrat Katharine Worsley
- 2 December 1961: Princess Antoinette of Monaco and Dr. Jean-Charles Rey
- 20 March 1963: Palden Thondup Namgyal, Chogyal (King) of Sikkim and American Hope Cooke
- 30 June/5 August 1963: Prince Ra'ad bin Zeid and Swedish Margaretha Inga Elisabeth Lind
- 30 June 1964: Princess Margaretha of Sweden and English businessman John Ambler
- 7 February 1965: Prince Michael of Greece and Denmark and artist Marina Karella
- 7 July 1965: Archduke Géza von Habsburg and Monika Decker
- 16 December 1966: Princess Yasuko of Mikasa (Japan) and aristocrat Tadateru Konoe
- 10 January 1967: Princess Margriet of the Netherlands and Pieter van Vollenhoven
- 1 March 1967 Prince Charles of Luxembourg and American Joan Dillon
- 13 January 1968: Prince Ingolf of Denmark and Inge Terney
- 29 August 1968: Harald, Crown Prince of Norway and Sonja Haraldsen, daughter of clothing merchant Karl August Haraldsen
- 23 September 1969: Princess Elizabeth of Yugoslavia and British politician Neil Balfour
- 16 November 1969: Princess Marie Louise of Bulgaria and Bronisław Tomasz Andrzej Chrobok
- 1971: Vittorio Emanuele, Prince of Naples and Swiss water skier Marina Doria
- 9 February 1971: Prince Christian of Denmark and Anne Dorte Maltoft-Nielsen
- 11 September 1971: Prince Philipp of Liechtenstein and Belgian aristocrat Isabelle de l'Arbre de Malander
- 8 July 1972: Prince Richard of Gloucester and Danish Birgitte van Deurs
- 12 October 1972: Infanta Margarita, Duchess of Soria and Dr. Carlos Zurita y Delgado
- 24 December 1972: King Hussein I of Jordan and Alia Toukan
- 14 November 1973: Princess Anne of the United Kingdom and Captain Mark Phillips
- 15 June 1974: Princess Christina of Sweden and Tord Magnuson
- 28 June 1975: Princess Christina of the Netherlands and Cuban Jorge Guillermo
- 1 October 1975: Princess Olga Andreevna Romanoff and Thomas Mathew
- 25 December 1975: Sultan Abdul Halim of Kedah and Haminah binti Hamidun
- 1976: Julio I, Afro-Bolivian King and Angélica Larrea
- 19 June 1976: King Carl XVI Gustaf of Sweden and German interpreter Silvia Sommerlath
- 7 December 1976: Prince Bertil, Duke of Halland and British model Lilian Davies
- 15 June 1978: King Hussein I of Jordan and American urban planner Lisa Halaby
- 29 June 1978: Princess Caroline of Monaco and French businessman Philippe Junot
- 7 November 1980: Prince Tomohito of Mikasa (Japan) and Nobuko Asō
- 20 July 1983: Princess Elena of Romania and British professor Robin Medforth-Mills
- 28 July 1983: Princess Antoinette of Monaco and British ballet dancer John Gilpin
- 4 October 1983: Princess Irina of Romania and John Kreuger, son of Swedish magnate Torsten Kreuger
- 14 October 1983: Princess Masako of Mikasa (Japan) and Masayuki Sen
- 29 December 1983: Princess Caroline of Monaco and Italian heir Stefano Casiraghi
- 1 December 1984: Prince Norihito of Mikasa (Japan) and Hisako Tottori
- 20 September 1985: Alexander, Crown Prince of Yugoslavia and Greek Katherine Batis
- 1986: King Mswati III of Eswatini and Sibonelo Mngometulu
- 1986: Reza Pahlavi, Crown Prince of Iran and Yasmine Etemad-Amini
- 23 July 1986: Prince Andrew of the United Kingdom and Sarah Ferguson
- 1987: Prince Andrew Romanoff and Inez Storer
- 28 February 1987: Princess Elizabeth of Yugoslavia and Peruvian statesman Manuel Ulloa Elías
- 27 May 1987 Prince Jean of Luxembourg and Hélène Suzanna Vestur
- 5 December 1987: Princess Katarina of Yugoslavia and Sri Lankan barrister Sir Desmond de Silva
- 8 July 1988: Princess Tania of Bourbon-Parma and Gilbert Jacques Marcel Bécaud, son of French singer Gilbert Bécaud
- 1989: Prince Heinrich XIII of Reuss and Susan Doukht Jalali
- 29 June 1990: Fumihito, Prince Aya of Japan and Kiko Kawashima
- 1991: King Abdullah of Pahang and model and actress Julia Rais
- 1 July 1992: Prince Mired bin Ra'ad of Jordan and Dina Mohammad Khalifeh
- 12 December 1992: Princess Anne, Princess Royal of the United Kingdom and Royal Navy officer Timothy Laurence
- 9 June 1993: Naruhito, Crown Prince of Japan and diplomat Masako Owada
- 10 June 1993: Prince Abdullah of Jordan and Palestine businesswoman Rania Al-Yassin
- 29 January 1994: Prince Robert of Luxembourg and Julie Elizabeth Houston Ongaro
- February 1994: Crown Prince Vajiralongkorn of Thailand and Sujarinee Vivacharawongse
- 1 July 1995: Pavlos, Crown Prince of Greece and American heiress Marie-Chantal Miller
- 1 July 1995: Princess Stéphanie of Monaco and her French bodyguard Daniel Ducruet
- 4 August 1995: Princess Maria-Pia of Liechtenstein and Austrian banker Max Kothbauer
- 18 November 1995: Prince Joachim of Denmark and Anglo-Chinese executive Alexandra Manley
- 24 July 1996: Princess Margareta of Romania and Radu Duda
- 6 August 1997: Princess Diya Kumari of Jaipur and Narendra Singh
- 4 October 1997: Infanta Cristina of Spain and handball player Iñaki Urdangarin
- 1998: Prince David Oyelowo of Awe and British actress Jessica Watson
- 27 June 1998: Princess Alexandra of Greece and Nicolas Mirzayantz
- 29 August 1998: Princess Sophie of Romania and Alain Michel Biarneix
- 31 October 1998: Prince Carlo, Duke of Castro and Italian heiress Camilla Crociani
- 30 April 1999: Prince Heinrich Julius of Hanover and Thyra von Westernhagen
- 19 June 1999: Prince Edward of the United Kingdom and Sophie Rhys-Jones
- 9 July 1999: Princess Alexia of Greece and Denmark and Spanish architect Carlos Morales
- 7 August 1999: Prince Firas bin Ra'ad and Dana Nabil Toukan

== 21st century ==
- 2000: King Mswati III of Eswatini and painter Senteni Masango
- 29 January 2000 Prince Maximilian of Liechtenstein and American fashion designer Angela Brown
- 18 February 2000 King Letsie III of Lesotho and 'Masenate Mohato Seeiso
- 5 July 2000: Prince Zeid bin Ra'ad and American Sarah Antonia Butler
- 10 February 2001: Crown Prince Vajiralongkorn of Thailand and Srirasmi Suwadee
- 19 May 2001: Prince Constantijn of the Netherlands and Petra Laurentien Brinkhorst
- 25 August 2001: Haakon, Crown Prince of Norway and single mother Mette-Marit Tjessem Høiby
- 12 October 2001: King Mohammed VI of Morocco and Salma Bennani
- 2 February 2002: Prince Willem-Alexander, Prince of Orange and Argentine Máxima Zorreguieta Cerruti
- 24 May 2002: Princess Märtha Louise of Norway and author Ari Behn
- 26 October 2002: Princess Kalina of Bulgaria and Kitín Muñoz
- 8 February 2003: Prince Alexander of Liechtenstein and Astrid Kohl
- 12 April 2003 : Prince Laurent of Belgium and Claire Louise Coombs
- 12 September 2003: Princess Stéphanie of Monaco and acrobat Adans Lopez Peres
- 25 September 2003: Emanuele Filiberto of Savoy, Prince of Venice and French actress Clotilde Courau
- 24 April 2004: Prince Friso of the Netherlands and Mabel Wisse Smit
- 14 May 2004: Frederik, Crown Prince of Denmark and Australian entrepreneur Mary Donaldson
- 22 May 2004: Felipe, Prince of Asturias (Spain) and journalist Letizia Ortiz
- 7 September 2004: Prince Ali bin Hussein and Algerian journalist Rym Brahimi
- 5 November 2004: Prince Louis Alphonse, Duke of Anjou and Venezuelan María Margarita Vargas Santaella
- 2005: King Mswati III of Eswatini and beauty pageant winner Nothando Dube
- 15 November 2005: Sayako, Princess Nori of Japan and urban designer Yoshiki Kuroda
- 28 January 2006: Prince Adekunle Adebayo Omilana of Ipetu-Ijesa and American entrepreneur Keisha Bolden
- 29 September 2006: Prince Louis of Luxembourg and Tessy Antony
- 2007: Princess Tania of Bourbon-Parma and Louis-Arnaud L'Herbier
- 24 May 2008: Prince Joachim of Denmark and French entrepreneur Marie Cavallier
- 23 May 2009: Hubertus, Hereditary Prince of Saxe-Coburg and Gotha and American investment banker Kelly Rondestvedt
- 2010: King Mswati III of Eswatini and Zena Mahlangu
- 19 June 2010: Victoria, Crown Princess of Sweden and her personal trainer Daniel Westling
- 25 August 2010: Prince Nikolaos of Greece and Denmark and Venezuelan Tatiana Blatnik
- 28 August 2010: Prince Carlos, Duke of Parma and Annemarie Gualthérie van Weezel
- 29 April 2011: Prince William of Wales (United Kingdom) and Catherine Middleton
- 2 July 2011: Albert II, Prince of Monaco and South African Olympic swimmer Charlene Wittstock
- 21 April 2012: Princess Carolina de Bourbon de Parme and German heir Albert Brenninkmeijer
- 2013: King Mswati III of Eswatini and beauty pageant winner Sindiswa Dlamini
- 8 June 2013: Princess Madeleine, Duchess of Hälsingland and Gästrikland (Sweden) and British-American financier Christopher O'Neill
- July 2013: Manvendra Singh Gohil, Hereditary Prince of Rajpipla and Cecil DeAndre Richardson
- 31 August 2013: Prince Rahim Aga Khan and American model Kendra Irene Spears
- 17 September 2013: Prince Felix of Luxembourg and Claire Lademacher
- 5 October 2013: Prince Jaime de Bourbon de Parme and Hungarian-Dutch corporate lawyer Viktória Cservenyák
- 10 May 2014: Prince Juan de Bagration-Mukhrani and model and beauty pageant queen Kristine Dzidziguri
- 27 May 2014: Princess Noriko of Takamado (Japan) and Shinto priest Kunimaro Senge
- 24 October 2014: Ismail Idris, Crown Prince of Johor and Khaleeda Bustamam
- 13 June 2015: Prince Carl Philip, Duke of Värmland (Sweden) and model Sofia Hellqvist
- 8 July 2017: Ernst August, Hereditary Prince of Hanover and designer Ekaterina Igorievna Malysheva
- 9 September 2017: Prince Joel Dawit Makonnen and Ariana Joy Lalita Austin
- 6 October 2017: Nicholas Medforth-Mills and Alina-Maria Binder
- 7 October 2017: Philip, Hereditary Prince of Yugoslavia and designer Danica Marinković
- 16 March 2018: Prince Christian of Hanover and Alessandra de Osma
- 19 May 2018: Prince Harry of Wales (United Kingdom) and American actress Meghan Markle
- 7 June 2018: Muhammad V, Sultan of Kelantan and Russian model Oksana Voevodina
- 12 October 2018: Princess Eugenie of York (United Kingdom) and Jack Brooksbank
- 29 October 2018: Princess Ayako of Takamado (Japan) and businessman Kei Moriya
- 1 May 2019: King Vajiralongkorn of Thailand and bodyguard Suthida Tidjai
- 20 July 2020: Archduchess Eleonore of Austria and racing driver Jérôme d'Ambrosio
- 12 December 2020: Prince Philippos of Greece and Denmark and Swiss heiress Nina Flohr
- 2021: Prince Rostislav Romanov and Foteini Georganta
- 4 September 2021: Princess Maria-Anunciata of Liechtenstein and American businessman Carlo Emanuele Musini
- 19 September 2021: Prince Majahonkhe Dlamini of Eswatini and gospel singer Nothando Hlophe
- 25 September 2021: Princess Marie-Astrid of Liechtenstein and American businessman Ralph Worthington V
- 26 October 2021: Princess Mako of Akishino (Japan) and Kei Komuro
- 2022: Archduke Karl, Archduke of Austria and Christian Nicolau de Almeida Reid
- 28 May 2022: Princess Mafalda Cecilia of Bulgaria and Marc Abousleiman
- 3 September 2022: Prince August zu Sayn-Wittgenstein-Berleburg and Austrian podcaster Mia Rohla
- 24 September 2022: Grand Duke George Mikhailovich of Russia and Rebecca Virginia Bettarini
- 12 March 2023: Princess Iman of Jordan and Venezuelan businessman Jameel Alexander Thermiótis
- 14 January 2024: Prince Abdul Mateen of Brunei and Anisha Rosnah
- 31 August 2024: Princess Märtha Louise of Norway and American shaman Durek Verrett
- 28 September 2024: Princess Theodora of Greece and Denmark and American attorney Matthew Jeremiah Kumar
- 7 February 2025: Prince Nikolaos of Greece and Denmark and Chrysí Vardinogianni
