= Succession to the Swazi throne =

System of choosing the King of Eswatini

In Eswatini, no king (Ngwenyama, 'lion') can appoint his successor. Instead, on the demise of a king, the Liqoqo, an independent traditional council, decides which of his wives shall be "great wife" and Indlovukazi, 'She-Elephant'. The son of the chosen Indlovukazi will automatically become the next king.

The Indlovukazi is chosen after the death of the king and must be of good character. Her character affects her child's chances of ascending to the status of king. According to Swazi culture, a son cannot be the heir if his mother is not of good standing. She must not bear the maiden name of Nkhosi-Dlamini, as Dlamini is the name of the royal house and she must not be a ritual wife (see next paragraph).

The current king, Mswati III, has 11 wives (2 have permanently left him and 2 are deceased), 39 children and 13 grandchildren. The first two wives of a Swazi king are chosen for him by the national councillors. These two have special functions in rituals and their sons can never become kings. The first wife must be a member of the Matsebula clan, the second of the Motsa clan. These wives are known as tesulamsiti.

A royal fiancée is called liphovela, or "bride". They graduate from being fiancées to full wives as soon as they fall pregnant, when the king customarily marries them. However, the traditional marriage, known as “Ludvendve” (marriage to the king) only follows later.

In traditional Swazi culture, the king is expected to marry a woman from every clan in order to cement relationships with each part of Eswatini. This means that the king must have many wives.

== Family of King Mswati III ==
- Inkhosikati (Queen) LaMatsebula—Ritual wife. Has a degree in Psychology.
  - Son: Prince Sicalo (1987) sired the King's second grandchild, a girl named HRH Princess Tibu Dlamini in 2013. His first wife is Inkhosikati laMbingo (Nozipho Mbingo) ad they have two sons. His second wife Inkhosikati laMagagula.
  - Son: Prince Maveletiveni
- Inkhosikati LaMotsa—Ritual wife. United Nations Development Programme (UNDP) Goodwill Ambassador since 1996.
  - Son: Prince Majahonkhe (1991) sired the King's first grandchild, a girl named HRH Princess Lamahle Dlamini in 2012 with Nonsindiso Ginindza but moved on and betrothed gospel singer Nothando Hlophe Inkhosikati laHlophe (1989) in September 2019 who gave birth to the King's eighth grandchild, a boy named HRH Prince Alakhiwelivelemaswati Dlamini in 2020 and she was officially married on 19 September 2021. The prince married his second wife, Miss Cultural Heritage 2018 contestant, Temlandvo Khumalo (1996) Inkhsoikati laKhumalo seven days later.
  - Son: Prince Buhlebenkhosi (1997)
  - Son: Prince Lusuku
  - Son: Prince Sinawonkhe

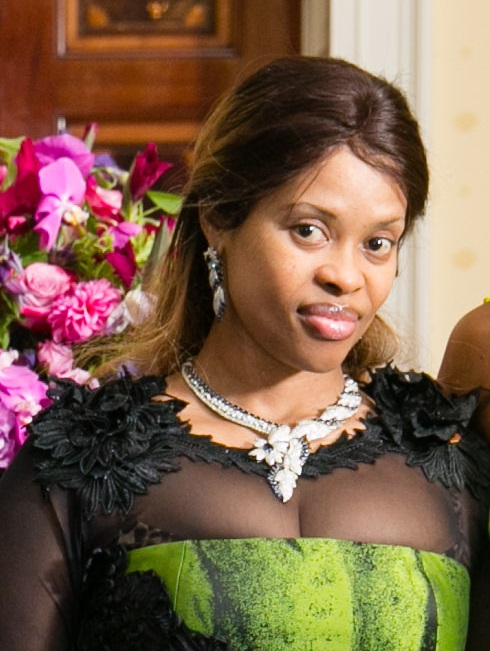
Inkhosikati LaMbikiza

- 1986 Inkhosikati LaMbikiza—(born 16 June 1969 as Sibonelo Mngomezulu) Daughter of Percy Mngomezulu; an advocate, received an LLB from UNISA in 2001 and a graphic design degree from Limkokwing University in 2017. LaMbikiza is involved in the Swazi Royal Initiative to Combat AIDS (RICA). The initiative involves the recording of songs by Swazi, South African and international artists and the proceeds of the sales are allocated to programmes aimed at helping people affected by AIDS.
  - Daughter: Princess Sikhanyiso Dlamini (1987) had the King's seventh grandchild, a boy named Phikolwezwe Elihu Dlamini, on Good Friday 2020 and gave birth to a 12th grandchild, a boy named Mbutfo Lonjinga Dlamini in 2023 with soldier Patrick Khayelihle Dlamini
  - Son: Prince Lindani Dlamini (1989) Betrothed Miss Fatima Loureiro (1994) in August 2020 now known as Inkhosikati LaNdwandwe; she was officially married on 11 September 2021 and gave birth to the King's tenth grandchild, a daughter named HRH Princess Lisulakhe Sigodlo Dlamini on 3 November 2021 and the 16th grandchild a son named HRH Mshumayeli Lasa Dlamini on 28 October 2024.
- Inkhosikati LaNgangaza—(born 25 December 1970 as Carol Dlamini) Patron of world organisation "Hospice at Home" previously headed by Diana, Princess of Wales.
  - Daughter: Princess Temaswati Dlamini (1988) got engaged to Mbabane Swallows soccer player Lwazi Maziya (1983) on 4 April 2021 and gave birth to the King's 13th grandchild, a boy named Mcanco, in December 2023 and the 14th grandchild a girl in 2024.
  - Daughter: Princess Tiyandza Dlamini (1992) got engaged at Nhlangano Reed dance 2019 to Luis Leite and gave birth to the King's sixth grandchild, a girl named Lwandzilelutsandvo Maggie Madre Leite (2020) and a ninth grandchild, a boy named Leonardo (2021)
  - Daughter: Princess Tebukhosi Dlamini (1994) had the King's fourth grandchild, a boy named Tisekelo, in 2018 with Mahlobo Dlamini.
  - Daughter: Princess Wesive Mazwezulu Dlamini (2012)
- Inkhosikati LaHwala—(born 15 November 1974) She left the king on June 24, 2004 and moved to South Africa.
  - Son: Prince Bandzile (1990) Married Kitali Stankozci, now known as LaMnisi on 15 September 2021, separated in 2025. He is now engaged to laMaseko
  - Daughter: Princess Temashayina Sibahle, Mrs Monteiro Nunes (1996) got engaged to Yassin Monteiro Nunes in 2022 and gave birth to the King's eleventh grandchild, a boy in 2022. They finally got married over the weekend of 26 and 27 July 2025.
- Inkhosikati LaMagwaza—(born 29 May 1974) She also left the king in 2004, after having an affair. She married a South African businessman, with whom she has a child.
  - Daughter: Princess Temtsimba Dlamini, mrs Schofield (1992) first of the King's children to get married; she married a jeweller named Keenin Schofield on 22 July 2017 at Ludzidzini Royal Residence and gave birth to the King's third grandchild, a girl named Tiyabusa (2017) and a fifth grandchild, a daughter named Tabelwe (2019).
  - Daughter: Princess Sakhizwe Dlamini (1999)
- August 2000 Inkhosikati LaMasango—(born 12 July 1981 as Senteni Masango and allegedly committed suicide, never confirmed, on 6 April 2018). At the time of her death she had been at her sister's funeral a week earlier, apparently without the king's consent. She was a painter.
  - Daughter: Princess Sentelweyinkhosi (2000)
  - Daughter: Princess Sibusisezweni (2003)
- December 1998 Inkhosikati LaGija—(born 15 June 1979 as Angel Dlamini). In May 2012 she left the royal compound. She, however, marked her return to the Swazi royal household in 2018 by taking part in the Umhlanga Reed Dance and was also later seen at the 2018 World Trade Fair alongside the King, 7th wife LaMahlangu and Ritual wife LaMatsebula.
  - Daughter: Princess Nkhosiyenzile (2003)
- June 2002 Inkhosikati LaMagongo—(born 1 March 1985 as Nontsetselo Magongo) Niece of late Chief Mlobokazana Fakudze, Chief at Mgazini, cousin to current Chief. She is away from the spotlight unlike the other queens, but she notably attended the inauguration of South Africa's 5th democratically elected President Cyril Ramaphosa in the country's capital city; Pretoria at Loftus Versveld Stadium alongside the King on 25 May 2019.
  - Son: Prince Mcwasho (2003)
- November 2002 Inkhosikati LaMahlangu—(born 1984 as Zena Mahlangu) (see LaMahlangu controversy)
  - Son: Prince Saziwangaye (2004)
  - Daughter: Princess Lomabheka (2013)
  - Son:
- May 2005 Inkhosikati LaNtentesa (born 1981 as Noliqhwa Ayanda Ntentesa), betrothed November 2002, married in a traditional function held at Ludzidzini Royal Residence May 26, 2005 Graduated from the Institute of Development Management in 2017 with a diploma in Human Resources Management.
  - Daughter: Princess Sabusiswa Dlamini (2012)
- 11 June 2005 Inkhosikati LaDube (born 6 February 1988 as Nothando Mosa and died on 7 March 2019 during Emaganu Ceremony from a skin cancer related illness) former Miss Teen Swaziland finalist at age 16, she was chosen at the Umhlanga ceremony on 30 August 2004. She met the king at the birthday party of one of his children before she participated in the Miss Swaziland Teen beauty pageant. Her father is South African, from Barberton.
  - Daughter: Princess Makhosothando (2005)
  - Son: Prince Betive (2007)
  - Daughter: Princess Mahlemalangeni Temave (2009)
- April 14, 2007 Inkhosikati LaNkambule (born 15 February 1988 as Phindile Nkambule), chosen at the Umhlanga in 2005 at age 17.
  - Daughter: Princess Sihlalosemusa Buhlebetive (2007)
  - Daughter: Princess Nikudumo Dlamini (2009)
  - Daughter: Princess Mphilwenhle Dlamini (2012)
  - Son: Prince Mehluli Dlamini (2014)
  - Daughter: Princess Mpandzese (2018)
  - Daughter: Princess Lomchele (2019)

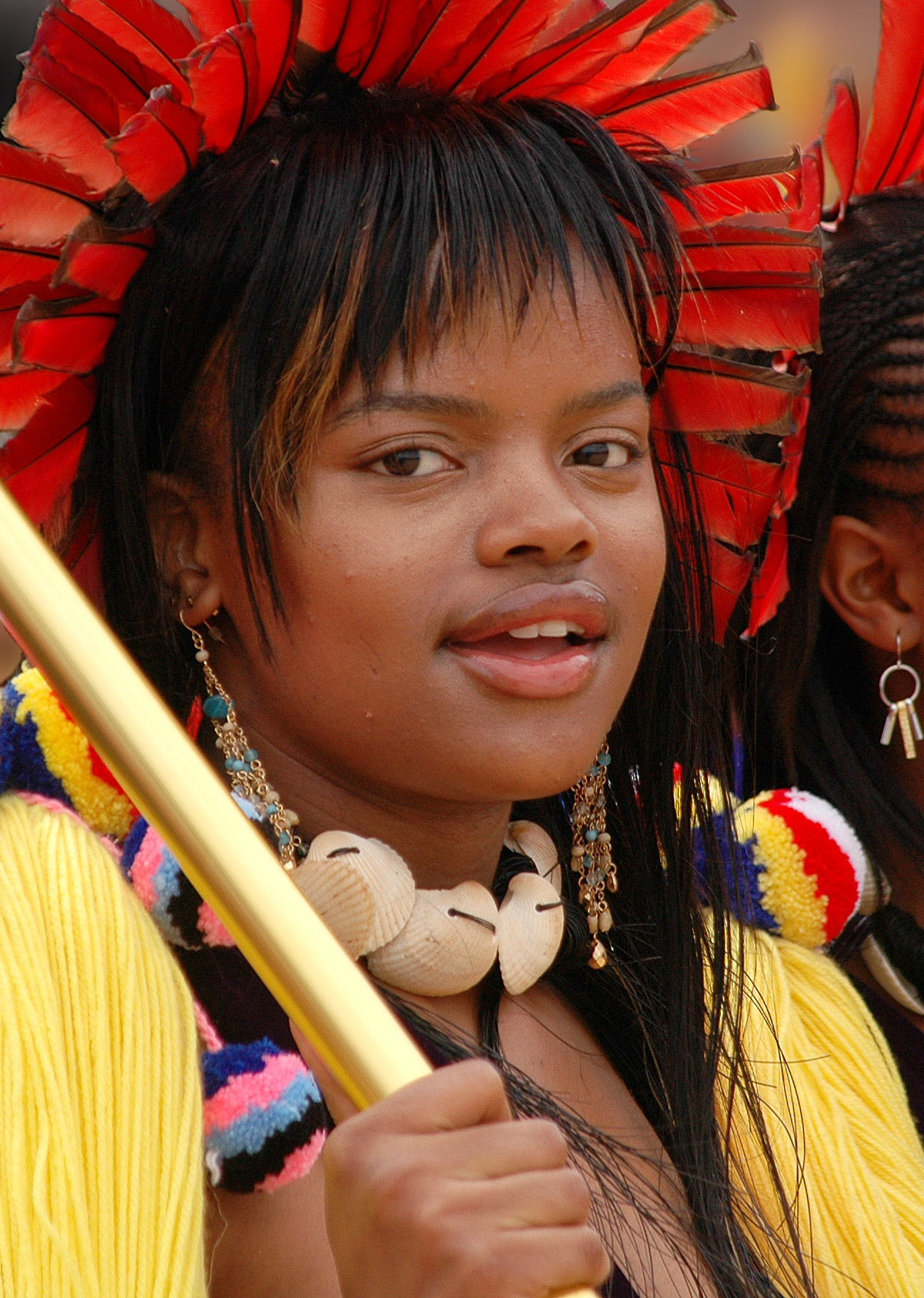
Sikhanyiso Dlamini at the 2006 Umhlanga

- August 30, 2014 Inkhosikati LaFogiyane (born 7 January 1995 as Sindiswa Dlamini) former beauty queen, she graduated from Mbabane's St. Francis High School in 2012 and was a finalist in the Miss Cultural Heritage beauty pageant. She was introduced at the Reed Dance in Shiselweni Region on 13 September 2013. She became an Inkhosikati on August 30, 2014.
  - Daughter: Princess Ntsandvweni (2015)
  - Daughter: Princess Nolikhwa (2017)
  - Son:
- 2019 Inkhosikati LaMashwama (born 1998 as Siphelele Mashwama) daughter of Jabulile Mashwama; one of the country's senators. She was a student at University of Rochester in the United States when her parents terminated her studies in September 2017 to marry the King. Siphelele was notably voted the most eloquent speaker when she presented a paper on empathy at a conference in 2016 at the university.
  - Son: Prince Mkhandlowenkhosi (2021)
  - Son:
- May 22, 2024 Liphovela (Fiancée) Nomcebo Zuma (born 2002) at the 2024 Umhlanga. She is the daughter of the former South African president Jacob Zuma
