= List of current consorts of sovereigns =

The following is a list of current royal consorts—people with an official status through marriage or concubinage with a reigning monarch. The list only includes royal consorts of sovereign states, and does not include viceregal consorts such as spouses of governors-general, nor does it include consorts of non-sovereign monarchies (such as the Yogyakarta Sultanate, the Māori King movement, or the traditional monarchies of South Africa).

== Consorts by country ==
Dominion	Picture	Coat of arms	Name	Birth (age)	Marriage	Became consort	Consort to
Andorra		—N/a	Brigitte Macron	13 April 1953 (age 73)	20 October 2007	14 May 2017	Emmanuel Macron
Antigua and Barbuda			Queen Camilla	17 July 1947 (age 79)	9 April 2005	8 September 2022	King Charles III
Australia			Queen Camilla	17 July 1947 (age 79)	9 April 2005	8 September 2022	King Charles III
The Bahamas			Queen Camilla	17 July 1947 (age 79)	9 April 2005	8 September 2022	King Charles III
Belize			Queen Camilla	17 July 1947 (age 79)	9 April 2005	8 September 2022	King Charles III
Canada			Queen Camilla	17 July 1947 (age 79)	9 April 2005	8 September 2022	King Charles III
Grenada			Queen Camilla	17 July 1947 (age 79)	9 April 2005	8 September 2022	King Charles III
Jamaica			Queen Camilla	17 July 1947 (age 79)	9 April 2005	8 September 2022	King Charles III
New Zealand			Queen Camilla	17 July 1947 (age 79)	9 April 2005	8 September 2022	King Charles III
Papua New Guinea			Queen Camilla	17 July 1947 (age 79)	9 April 2005	8 September 2022	King Charles III
Saint Kitts and Nevis			Queen Camilla	17 July 1947 (age 79)	9 April 2005	8 September 2022	King Charles III
Saint Lucia			Queen Camilla	17 July 1947 (age 79)	9 April 2005	8 September 2022	King Charles III
Saint Vincent and the Grenadines			Queen Camilla	17 July 1947 (age 79)	9 April 2005	8 September 2022	King Charles III
Solomon Islands			Queen Camilla	17 July 1947 (age 79)	9 April 2005	8 September 2022	King Charles III
Tuvalu			Queen Camilla	17 July 1947 (age 79)	9 April 2005	8 September 2022	King Charles III
United Kingdom			Queen Camilla	17 July 1947 (age 79)	9 April 2005	8 September 2022	King Charles III
Bahrain		—N/a	Princess Sabika	1948 (age 77–78)	9 October 1968	6 March 1999	King Hamad
Bahrain		—N/a	3 other wives	—N/a		6 March 1999	King Hamad
Belgium			Queen Mathilde	20 January 1973 (age 53)	4 December 1999	21 July 2013	King Philippe
Bhutan		—N/a	Queen Jetsun Pema	4 June 1990 (age 36)	13 October 2011		King Jigme Khesar Namgyel Wangchuck
Brunei		—N/a	Queen Saleha	7 October 1946 (age 80)	29 July 1965	4 October 1967	Sultan Hassanal Bolkiah
Denmark			Queen Mary	5 February 1972 (age 54)	14 May 2004	14 January 2024	King Frederik X
Eswatini		—N/a	Queen Sibonelo	16 June 1969 (age 57)	1986		King Mswati III
Eswatini		—N/a	Queen Zena	1984 (age 41–42)	2010		King Mswati III
Eswatini		—N/a	Queen Sindiswa	7 January 1995 (age 31)	30 August 2014		King Mswati III
Eswatini		—N/a	8 other current wives	—N/a			King Mswati III
Japan			Empress Masako	9 December 1963 (age 62)	9 June 1993	1 May 2019	Emperor Naruhito
Jordan			Queen Rania	31 August 1970 (age 56)	10 June 1993	7 February 1999	King Abdullah II
Kuwait		—N/a	2 wives	—N/a		16 December 2023	Emir Mishal
Lesotho		—N/a	Queen 'Masenate Mohato Seeiso	2 June 1976 (age 50)	18 February 2000		King Letsie III
Luxembourg		—N/a	Grand Duchess Stéphanie	18 February 1984 (age 42)	19 October 2012	3 October 2025	Grand Duke Guillaume V
Malaysia		—N/a	Queen Zarith Sofiah	14 August 1959 (age 67)	22 September 1982	31 January 2024	King Ibrahim Iskandar
Monaco			Princess Charlene	25 January 1978 (age 48)	1 July 2011		Prince Albert II
Netherlands			Queen Máxima	17 May 1971 (age 55)	2 February 2002	30 April 2013	King Willem-Alexander
Norway			Queen Mette-Marit	19 August 1973 (age 53)	25 August 2001	28 August 2026	King Haakon VIII
Oman		—N/a	Sayyida Ahad	4 April 1969 (age 57)	1989	11 January 2020	Sultan Haitham
Qatar		—N/a	Sheikha Jawaher	1984 (age 41–42)	8 January 2005	25 June 2013	Emir Tamim
Qatar		—N/a	Sheikha Al-Anoud	1990 (age 35–36)	3 March 2009	25 June 2013	Emir Tamim
Qatar		—N/a	Sheikha Noora	—N/a	25 February 2014		Emir Tamim
Saudi Arabia		—N/a	Princess Fahda	—N/a	1984	23 January 2015	King Salman
Spain			Queen Letizia	15 September 1972 (age 54)	22 May 2004	19 June 2014	King Felipe VI
Sweden			Queen Silvia	23 December 1943 (age 82)	19 June 1976		King Carl XVI Gustaf
Thailand		—N/a	Queen Suthida	3 June 1978 (age 48)	1 May 2019		King Vajiralongkorn
Thailand		—N/a	Royal Noble Consort Sineenatha	26 January 1985 (age 41)	28 July 2019		King Vajiralongkorn
Tonga		—N/a	Queen Nanasipauʻu Tukuʻaho	8 March 1954 (age 72)	11 December 1982	18 March 2012	King Tupou VI
United Arab Emirates		—N/a	Sheikha Salama	1967 (age 58–59)	1981	14 May 2022	Sheikh Mohamed

== Unmarried sovereigns ==
- Norodom Sihamoni, King of Cambodia, who is personally committed to a monastic way of life.
- Pope Leo XIV, being an ordained priest of the Catholic Church, is sworn to celibacy.
- Josep-Lluís Serrano Pentinat, Co-Prince of Andorra, being an ordained priest of the Catholic Church, is sworn to celibacy.

== Widowed sovereigns ==
- Hans-Adam II, Sovereign Prince of Liechtenstein. His wife, Marie Kinsky of Wchinitz and Tettau, was princess consort of Liechtenstein until her death on 21 August 2021.
- Ntfombi, Queen Mother of Eswatini. She was married to King Sobhuza II until his death on 21 August 1982.

== Sovereigns who are divorced ==
- Charles III, King of the United Kingdom. He and his first wife, Diana, Princess of Wales, divorced in 1996. She died a year later.
- Hassanal Bolkiah, Sultan of Brunei. He was in polygamous marriages with Mariam Abdul Aziz and Azrinaz Mazhar Hakim until their respective divorces in 2003 and 2010.
- Mohammed VI, King of Morocco. He and his wife Salma divorced in 2018.

== See also ==
- List of current monarchs of sovereign states
- List of current heirs apparent
