= Sibonelo Mngometulu =

Eswatini royal consort (born 1969)

- Queen consort (Inkhosikati) of Eswatini
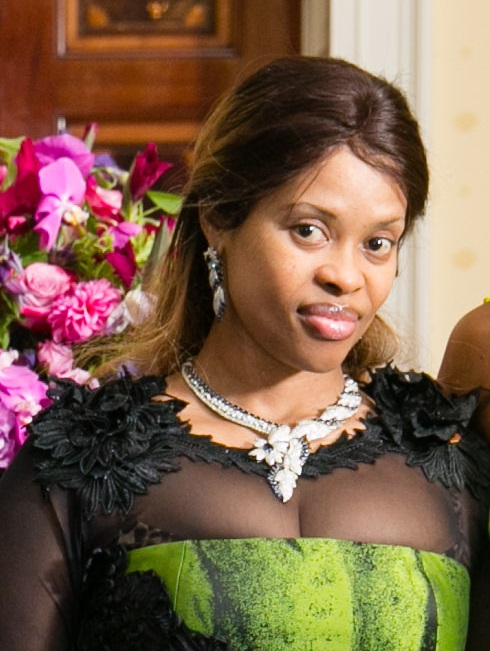
- Mngomentulu at the White House in 2014
- Born: 16 June 1969 (age 57)
- Spouse: Mswati III (1986–present)
- Issue: Princess Sikhanyiso Dlamini; Prince Lindani Dlamini
- House: House of Dlamini (by marriage)
- Father: Mbikiza Mngometulu
- Education: University of South Africa; Limkokwing University of Creative Technology

Sibonelo Mngometulu (born 16 June 1969), known as Inkhosikati LaMbikiza, is the third and senior wife of King Mswati III of Eswatini. Sibonelo married Mswati III in 1986, becoming the first wife he personally chose to marry, following two ceremonious marriages. She is the mother of Princess Sikhanyiso Dlamini and Prince Lindani Dlamini.

Although not permitted to practice law due to her status as a royal, she has a law degree from the University of South Africa and serves as a legal advisor to the king. As royal consort, Sibonelo serves a patron of Limkokwing University of Creative Technology and the Eswatini chapter of the Heal the World Foundation. She is the founder and director of multiple charitable organizations that champion public health and education. She has accompanied the king on various international visits, including the Diamond Jubilee of Elizabeth II in 2012, the United States–Africa Leaders Summit in 2014, and the Coronation of Charles III and Camilla in 2023.

== Early life and marriage ==
Sibonelo Mngometulu was born on 16 June 1969, the daughter of the diplomat Mbikiza Mngometulu, who served as the Eswatini Ambassador to the United Kingdom. She is a member of the Mngometulu tribe, descending from the Sotho people in South Africa.

When Sibonelo was sixteen years old, she met Prince Makhosetive of Swaziland while performing in the annual reed dance. Shortly after, when she was seventeen, Prince Makhosetive was crowned as King Mswati III and chose her to be his wife. She dropped out of school upon her marriage. Mswati III had two other wives, Inkhosikati LaMatsebula and Inkhosikati LaMotsa, who were ceremoniously chosen by the royal family, but she was the first wife to be personally chosen by the king.

She took up residence at the Nkoyoyo Royal Palace in Mbabane and at the Ludzidzini Royal Village.

Sibonelo has two children with the king, Princess Sikhanyiso Dlamini and Prince Lindani Dlamini.

== Royal consort ==
Sibonelo is Mswati III's senior wife. As a royal consort, Sibonelo has championed and promoted Christian causes, poverty-reduction, women's rights, HIV/AIDS prevention and treatment, reducing maternal mortality rates, maternal health, public health, and human rights in Eswatini. Despite being in a polygamous marriage, she has been an outspoken critic of polygamy.

She is the first Swazi queen to continue her education after marrying the king. Sibonelo completed a law degree from the University of South Africa. Although qualified to practice law in Eswatini, she is not permitted to do so as the royal family object to the idea of her working a common profession, and because a royal involved in law is seen as a potential disruption to the judicial process, as judges may change rule in favor of cases presented by the queen. Despite not practicing law, she does serve as the legal advisor to the king.

In 2012, she accompanied her husband to the Diamond Jubilee of Queen Elizabeth II.

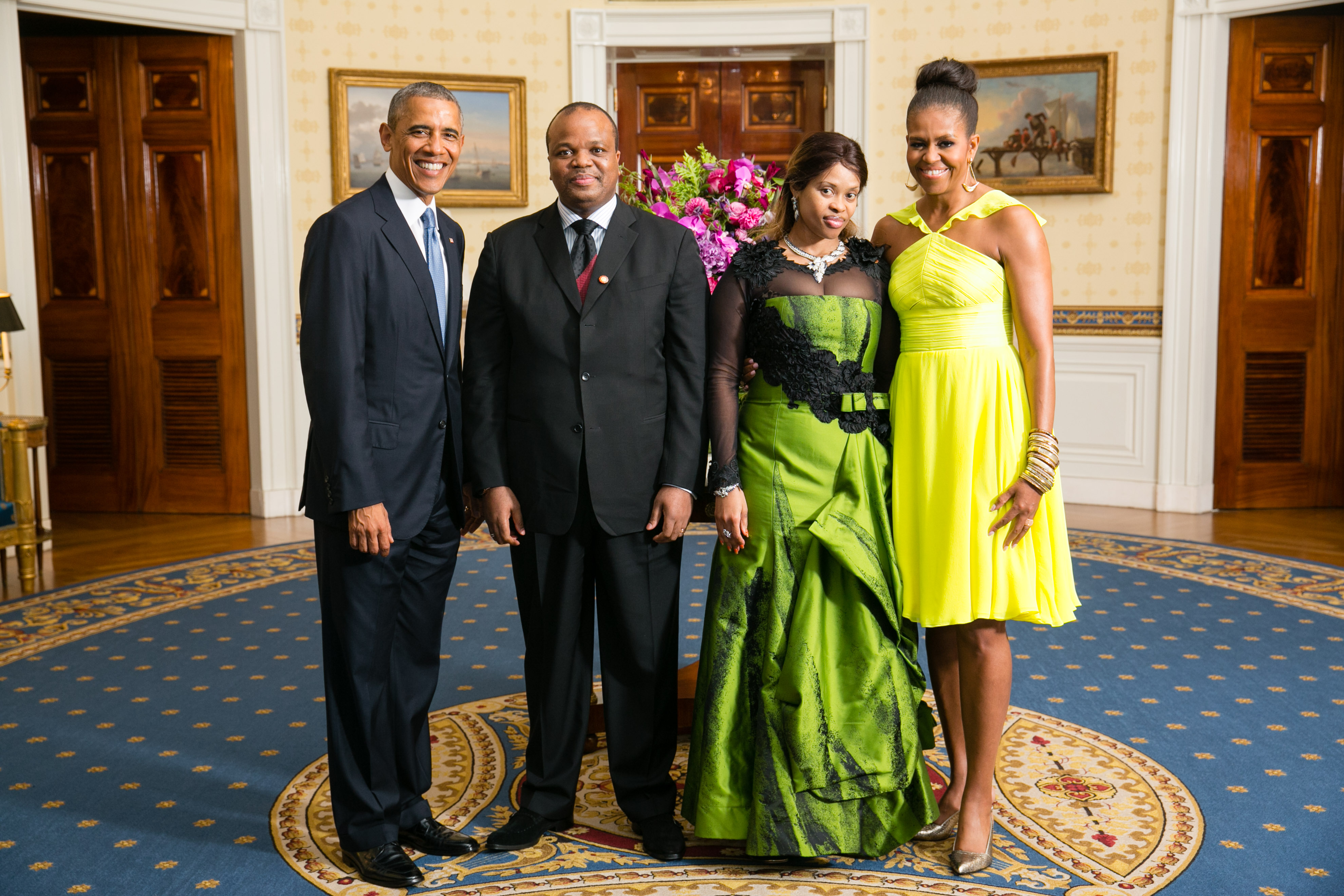
The King and Queen of Eswatini with U.S. President Barack Obama and First Lady Michelle Obama in 2014.

In August 2014, she and her husband attended the United States–Africa Leaders Summit, where they met with U.S. President Barack Obama and First Lady Michelle Obama at the White House.

In 2023, she accompanied her husband King Mswati III to the Coronation of King Charles III in London. While in London, she and her husband joined other leaders of the Commonwealth States for a discussion on the Commonwealth Heads of State and Government's declaration of 2023 as the "Year of the Youth". She also partook in an event for spouses of Commonwealth leaders where they discussed treatments and prevention for cervical cancer.

=== Royal patronages and charity work ===
She is the founder of the Lusito Charity Organization, a South-African charitable foundation that provides financial assistance to people living in poverty and pays for orphaned children to receive an education. She is also the director of the Swazi Royal Initiative to Combat AIDS and the director of Tisite, a charity that helps care workers.

In July 2013, Sibonelo was appointed as the honorary patron of Limkokwing University of Creative Technology and the Eswatini chapter of the Heal the World Foundation.

=== Controversies ===
In 2001, Mswati III fell ill and Sibonelo was accused by rivals in the royal family of poisoning him. She fled to London, where her father was serving in the Eswatini High Commission to the United Kingdom. After his recovery, her husband went to visit her in London and the two returned together to Eswatini.

On 19 January 2022, Sibonelo and her daughter, Princess Sikhanyiso, were admitted to the Mbabane Clinic for gastroenteritis. Amid allegations of poisoning circulating due to a power struggle within the Eswatini royal family, an investigation was opened to ascertain whether Sibonelo and her daughter had been poisoned or ill due to natural causes. Mayibongwe Masangane, the Secretary General of the Swaziland Democratic Nurses Union, criticized the royal family upon the queen and princess's admittance to the hospital, stating: "[The monarchy] destroyed the health system and now they are rushing to such clinics because they can afford the bills. Unlike in public hospitals, drugs and other working equipment is always available in such clinics because that’s where the rich and powerful are treated."

In August 2022, Sibonelo was allegedly assaulted by her husband after she questioned him about the paternity of their grandson, Prince Phikolezwe. Percy Simelane, the king's spokesperson, commented to the press that he is responsible for the public image of the king, not private matters, and claimed that any inquiry about domestic abuse within the royal family would be an invasion of the king's privacy. The political activist Lucky Lukhele, who serves as spokesperson of the Swaziland Solidarity Network, confirmed with media outlets that he was made aware of the king assaulting Sibonelo and confirmed that one of the king's late wives, Nothando Dube, had sent him photographs as evidence of the king assaulting her. Lukhele said, "I am aware that LaMbikiza was assaulted by Mswati and she lost her teeth in the process. Other queens are suffering at the hands of the king, he doesn’t want them to socialise with men that he sees as competitors, he has a low self-esteem." Sibonelo allegedly flew to South Africa on 15 August 2022 to receive dental implants after the assault.

== Personal life ==
Sibonelo is Christian and was the first Swazi queen to record a gospel album.

In 2007, she was featured in the documentary film Without the King, which followed political and social issues in Eswatini.

In 2017, she earned a degree in graphic design from the Limkokwing University of Creative Technology.
