= Nothando =

Nothando is a South African feminine given name.

Notable people with the name include:

- Nothando Dube (1988–2019), Swazi royal
- Nothando Hlophe (born 1989), Swazi royal and gospel singer
- Nothando Vilakazi (born 1988), South African soccer player
