= Ndumiso Mamba =

Ndumiso C. Mamba is a former minister of justice in Swaziland. He was a youth friend of king Mswati III. He became the minister of justice in October 2008. He resigned in August 2010 after being found in bed with one of King Mswati's wives, Nothando Dube, the 12th wife of the king, in Royal Villas Hotel near Mbabane in July 2010. Mamba is under house arrest. He is also accused of having spent too much on foreign journeys.
