= Zena Mahlangu =

Swazi royal (born 1984)

- Queen consort (Inkhosikati) of Eswatini
- Born: Zena Soraya Mahlangu; 1984 (age 41–42)
- Spouse: Mswati III
- Issue: Prince Saziwangaye; Princess Lomabheka
- House: House of Dlamini (by marriage)
- Father: Thulani Mahlangu
- Mother: Lindiwe Dlamini

Zena Soraya Mahlangu (born 1984) is a Swazi royal and the tenth wife of Mswati III. In 2002, when she was eighteen years old, she was abducted by two of the king's men and taken to the Ludzidzini Royal Village to accept royal duties and prepare to become the next royal bride. Her abduction led to a court case and international scandal, with various trade unions, organizations, and public figures, including Amnesty International, condemning the king and royal family's actions. She officially married the king in 2010, taking the royal title Inkhosikati LaMahlangu.

== Biography ==
Zena Soraya Mahlangu was born in 1984 and is the daughter of Lindiwe Dlamini, who works as the corporate communications manager of Swaziland's Post & Telecommunication, and Thulani Mahlangu, a radio engineer who died in a car crash in 1985. She is a distant relative of the Swazi Minister of Tourism, Environment, and Communication.

On 9 October 2002, when Mahlangu was an eighteen-year-old high school student, she disappeared from her school. Her mother reported the abduction to the Swazi police the following day, but there was no response. Mahlangu was reportedly abducted by two men, Qethuka Sgombeni Dlamini and Tulujani Sikhondze, and was brought to live at the Ludzidzini Royal Village as a liphovela (fiancée) of King Mswati III, who had seen her perform at the annual Reed Dance and later met her at a palace function in September 2002. Upon hearing that Mahlangu was being prepared to become the next wife of the king, her mother threatened to sue, demanding that her daughter be returned to her custody. Jan Sithole, the Secretary General of the Swaziland Federation of Trade Unions, referred to the incident as a "national crisis". Amnesty International accused Mswati III of human rights violations and discriminating against women, stating: "The king and his agents have violated the internationally recognized human rights of women and girls, including their right not to be arbitrarily detained and the right not to be subjected to forced marriage."

Among the criteria to be a liphovela, a woman must not be a twin. Mahlangu had a twin brother, and therefore was technically not eligible to marry the king. The matter was brought before the High Court of Swaziland, but the Attorney General Phesheya Mbongeni Dlamini intervened, allowing Mswati III to marry Mahlangu. The royal family repeatedly ignored the court during the case, refusing on multiple occasions to allow court-appointed women to interview Mahlangu to determine whether or not she wanted to marry the king. Dlamini was also not allowed to contact her daughter throughout the case.

Trade unionists, opposition groups, civic officials, human rights activists, and lawyers condemned the royal family's actions. The Law Society of Swaziland released a statement saying that the royal family's "conduct blatantly undermines the independence of the judiciary and directly interferes with the smooth administration of justice and the rule of law." Vulindlela Msibi, the president of the Human Rights Association of Swaziland, wrote a letter to Mswati III saying, "Such a practice, Your Majesty, is degrading, dehumanizing and traumatic to the dignity and person of women folk."

Mahlangu formally became the king's tenth wife in 2010, taking up the title Inkhosikati LaMahlangu. Their wedding was attended by King Kabaka Muwenda Mutebi II of Buganda. Mahlangu and Mswati III have two children: a son, Prince Saziwangaye, who was born in 2004 and a daughter, Princess Lomabheka, who was born in 2013.
