= Masango =

Masango may refer to:

== Places ==
- Massangano, a city in Angola
- Masango, Bisoro, a colline of Burundi

== People ==
- Bridget Masango (born 1962), South African politician
- James Masango, South African politician
- Mandla Masango (born 1989), South African football midfielder
- Senteni Masango (1981–2018), 8th wife of Mswati III of Eswatini
- Masango Matambanadzo (1964–2020), Zimbabwean politician
