= Muhammad Qadeer =

Muhammad Qadeer (born March 1975) is a Malaysian businessperson and a special envoy of Princess Sikhanyiso for investment promotion in the Kingdom of Swaziland. A special facilitation center has been established by his office in Malaysia for foreigner investors. Miss Swaziland Tourism beauty pageant Lindelwa Dlamini was received warmly by him along with First Secretary of Swaziland High Commission in Malaysia. The beauty pageant arrived in Malaysia to take part in contest of Miss Tourism World 2015 held in Malaysia in December 2015. Again in December 2016, he welcomed Nadia Nascimento, the beauty pageant who was crowned new Miss Tourism Swaziland 2016–17 visited Malaysia to participate in Miss Tourism International 2016 contest held in Malaysia. Nadia Nasicmento received a proposal from La Nor Cosmetics as Brand Ambassador. In May 2015, Princess Sikhanyiso officially launched Miss Tourism Swaziland and Mr. Muhammad Qadeer represents the Princess Sikhanyiso as her Special Envoy for investment promotion.
