= Sikhanyiso Dlamini =

Swazi princess and politician (born 1987)

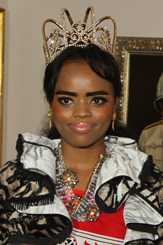
- Princess Sikhanyiso Dlamini in 2015

Minister of Information, Communication and Technology (Eswatini)
- In office 3 November 2018 – 11 July 2023
- Prime Minister: Themba N. Masuku (acting)
- Preceded by: Dumisani Ndlangamandla
- Succeeded by: Savannah Maziya

Personal details
- Born: 1 September 1987 (age 39) Mbabane, Swaziland
- Parents: Mswati III (father); Sibonelo Mngometulu (Inkhosikati La Mbikiza) (mother)
- Issue: Phikolwezwe Elihu Dlamini; Lisulakhe Sigodlo Dlamini
- House: Dlamini

Princess Sikhanyiso Dlamini (Swazi: [sikʰaɲiso ɮʱamini]; born 1 September 1987) is a Swazi politician and member of the Swazi royal family. She is the eldest daughter of King Mswati III. She served as Eswatini's Minister of Information and Communication Technology from 2018 to 2023.

== Early life and education ==
Sikhanyiso Dlamini was educated in Britain at a mixed private school, St Edmund's College, Ware, in Hertfordshire, where she was in Challoner House. She continued to study drama at Biola University in California, US. In 2012, Princess Sikhanyiso graduated from the University of Sydney with a master's degree in digital communication. While in Australia, she resided in Glebe with her palace-appointed aide, Yemma Sholo. She is the first child of Inkhosikati LaMbikiza and has more than two hundred blood-related uncles and aunts through her grandfather, King Sobhuza II, who had seventy wives and two hundred and one children. She is also one of his approximately one thousand grandchildren in the Royal Swazi House of Dlamini.

She is the first-born of two children born to King Mswati III and Inkhosikati LaMbikiza. She has two hundred aunts and uncles, not including their spouses.

In 2001, Mswati III instituted the umchwasho—a traditional chastity rite—in Swaziland as a means of combating the AIDS epidemic. The princess became a focus of controversy because, while she was staying abroad, she was not bound by the strictures of the umchwasho. While studying abroad, Princess Sikhanyiso was reported to have ignored or rejected some of her country's traditions.

== Controversies ==
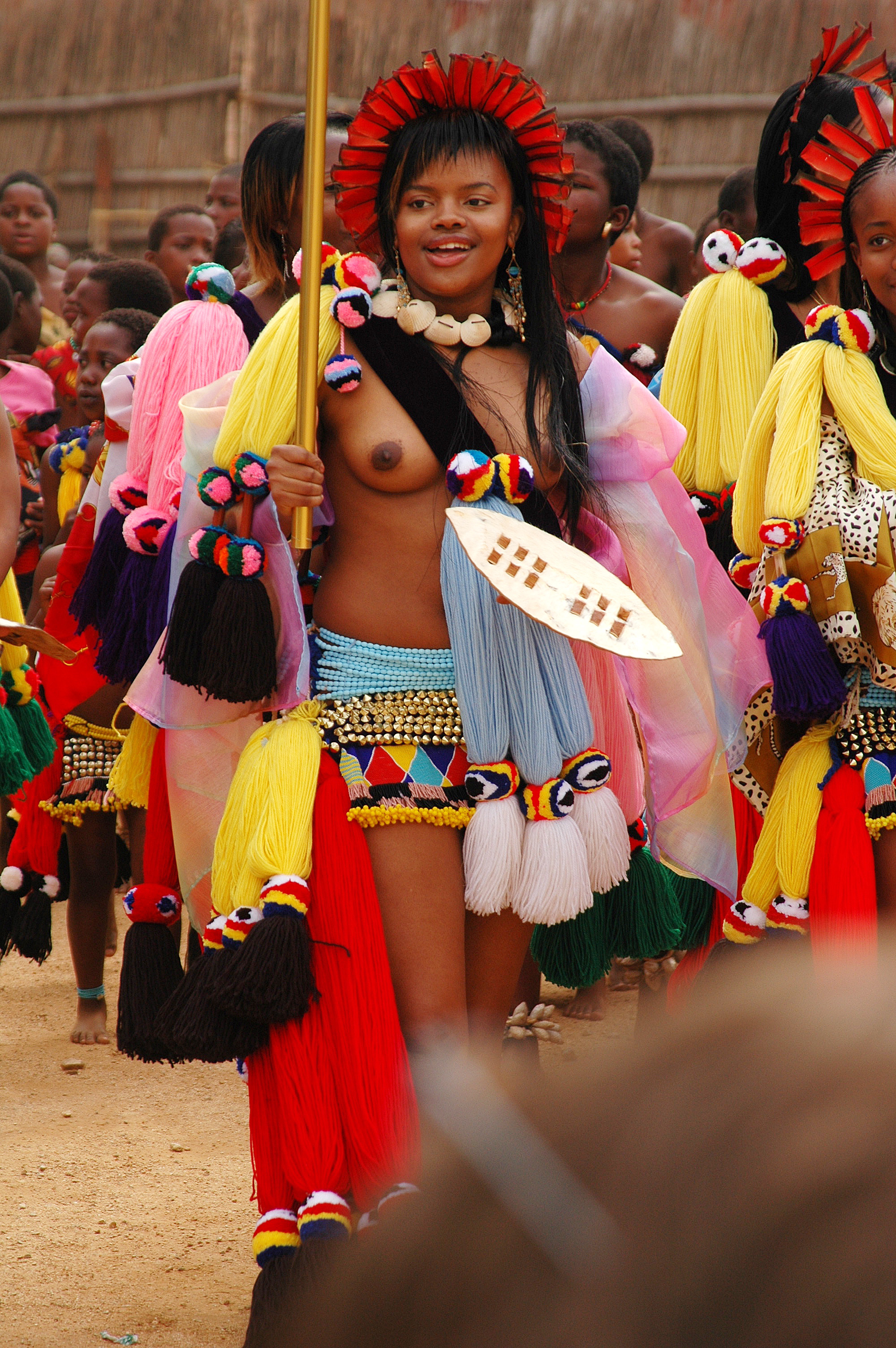
Princess Sikhanyiso Dlamini at the Reed Dance Festival in 2006. She wears a red feather crown, distinguishing her as a royal female at the event.

On 14 December 2003, a report appeared in the Times of Swaziland claiming that Princess Sikhanyiso had gone on a trip to the US and Britain, and that the Swazi government had spent close to E1 million (US$100,000) on her trip. The prime minister's office subsequently issued a press statement denying these claims.

In 2005, the then 17-year-old princess threw a party involving loud music and alcohol at the Queen mother's residence. As punishment for the princess's disrespect of the royal residence, during which Mswati announced his engagement to a new wife-to-be, an official overseeing traditional affairs beat Princess Sikhanyiso with a stick.

The following year, the princess criticized the institution of polygamy in Swaziland, saying, "Polygamy brings all advantages in a relationship to men, and this to me is unfair and evil." The princess was subsequently "gagged" by the Royal Palace and the press was not allowed to contact her.

She was featured in a 2007 documentary titled Without the King about the monarchy in Eswatini, the disparity between the royals' wealth and the widespread poverty of their subjects, and Eswatini's HIV/AIDS crisis.

== Achievements ==
The king supported the princess with her launch of the Imbali Foundation in April 2014. The foundation focuses on the health, education, and spirituality of Imbali YemaSwati (the regiment of Swazi maidens headed by the Inkhosatana or chief maiden). The princess runs the beauty pageant Miss Swaziland Tourism. The Swaziland Deaf Association requested her patronage for Miss Deaf Africa and received the government's support.

The princess is an aspiring actress and rapper and is commonly known as "Pashu" in Eswatini. During her brief stay in Malaysia for an internship program at Limkokwing University, she recorded a single titled "Hail Your Majesty" in honour of her father, the king. The debut of the tribute song received a standing ovation at Limkokwing during the conferment of an honorary doctorate to King Mswati III on 4 July 2013.

The princess is a member of the board of directors of MTN Swaziland, a multinational mobile telecommunications company. She has appointed a businessman from Malaysia, the director of MyStartBiz Sdn Bhd, Muhammad Qadeer, as her special envoy for investment promotion in the Kingdom of Swaziland.

== Discography ==
1. "Abeze Kim" (feat M'du and Prince Lindani)
2. "Hail Your Majesty"
