= Jabulile Mashwama =

Eswatini politician (born 1971)

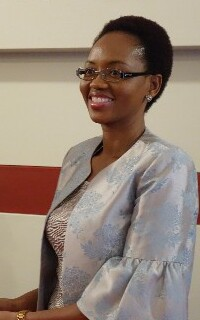
- Born: 1971 (age 54–55)
- Occupations: Politician and businessperson
- Known for: Minister of Natural Resources and Energy

Jabulile Mashwama (born 1971) is an Eswatini politician. She served as a minister before leading the Eswatini Water Services Corporation.

== Life ==
Mashwama was born in 1971. She went to school at Waterford Kamhlaba between 1984 and 1988 before studying science at university.

Mashwama became the Minister of Natural Resources and Energy in eSwatini.

She worked at Coca Cola Swaziland. In 2011, Wikileaks released an account of a meeting between her and the US Ambassador, Earl Irving. Irving was said to be impressed with her even though she seemed complacent about corruption. In 2014, she submitted her Master of Business Administration at the business school of the University of Pretoria.

In December 2018 she became the Managing Director of the Eswatini Water Services Corporation. Concerns were raised that the people who proposed and agreed to her appointment had themselves been appointed to the board by Mashwama when she was the responsible minister.

Mashwama joined the board of the International Water Association in August 2024. The news was announced in eZulwini where the World Bank Country Director congratulated her.

== Private life ==
Her partner is Dr Petros Mashwama, a university IT lecturer, and their daughter is Inkhosikati Siphelele Mashwama. She married King Mswati. She was thirty years younger than the king and his fourteenth wife.
