= Senteni Masango =

Queen of Eswatini

Inkhosikati LaMasango

Queen consort (Inkhosikati) of Eswatini
- Tenure: 2000–2018
- Born: Senteni Masango; July 1981
- Died: 6 April 2018 (aged 36)
- Spouse: Mswati III
- Issue: Princess Sentelweyinhosi; Princess Sibusezweni
- House: House of Dlamini (by marriage)

Senteni Masango, known after her marriage as Inkhosikati LaMasango, (July 1981 – 6 April 2018) was the eighth Inkhosikati (queen consort) and wife of Mswati III of Eswatini.

== Life ==
Masango was selected to be a new bride for Mswati III during the 1999 Uhmlanga ceremony. They were married in 2000. She gave birth to two children, Princess Sentelweyinkhosi and Princess Sibusezweni.

Masango was a painter. She auctioned off her work to raise funds for local charity organizations in Eswatini.

== Death ==
Masango was found dead on 6 April 2018. She had committed suicide by overdosing on amitriptyline. She died a week after the death of her sister, Nombuso Masango, whose funeral the king had reportedly forbidden her from attending. Her funeral was held at the Ludzidzini Royal Palace on 8 April 2018.

== Press scandals ==
On 12 September 1999 an editor at the Times of Swaziland, Bheki Makhubu, ran a news story titled Fiancée A High School Dropout. The story reported that Senteni Masango, who was engaged to the king at the time, had dropped out of Ngwane Park High School. The story caused controversy and lead to Makhubu's arrest by the Royal Swaziland Police. He was charged with criminal defamation. He was eventually released on a $500 bail and had his passport revoked.

Makhubu was arrested a second time in Mbabane after he printed a picture of Masango and another one of the king's wives, who was wearing her academic gown, at a graduation ceremony at the University of Swaziland. The headline contrasted Masango as "the dropout" and the other wife as "the graduate." After refusing to issue an apology, Makhubu was fired from the Times.

Another press scandal occurred after Masango's death. Photographs of her vigil and funeral at the royal palace were leaked to the press by members of the king's royal guards. The guards were fined for the incident.
