= Sindiswa Dlamini =

Swazi royal and beauty pageant contestant (born 1995)

- Queen consort (Inkhosikati) of Eswatini
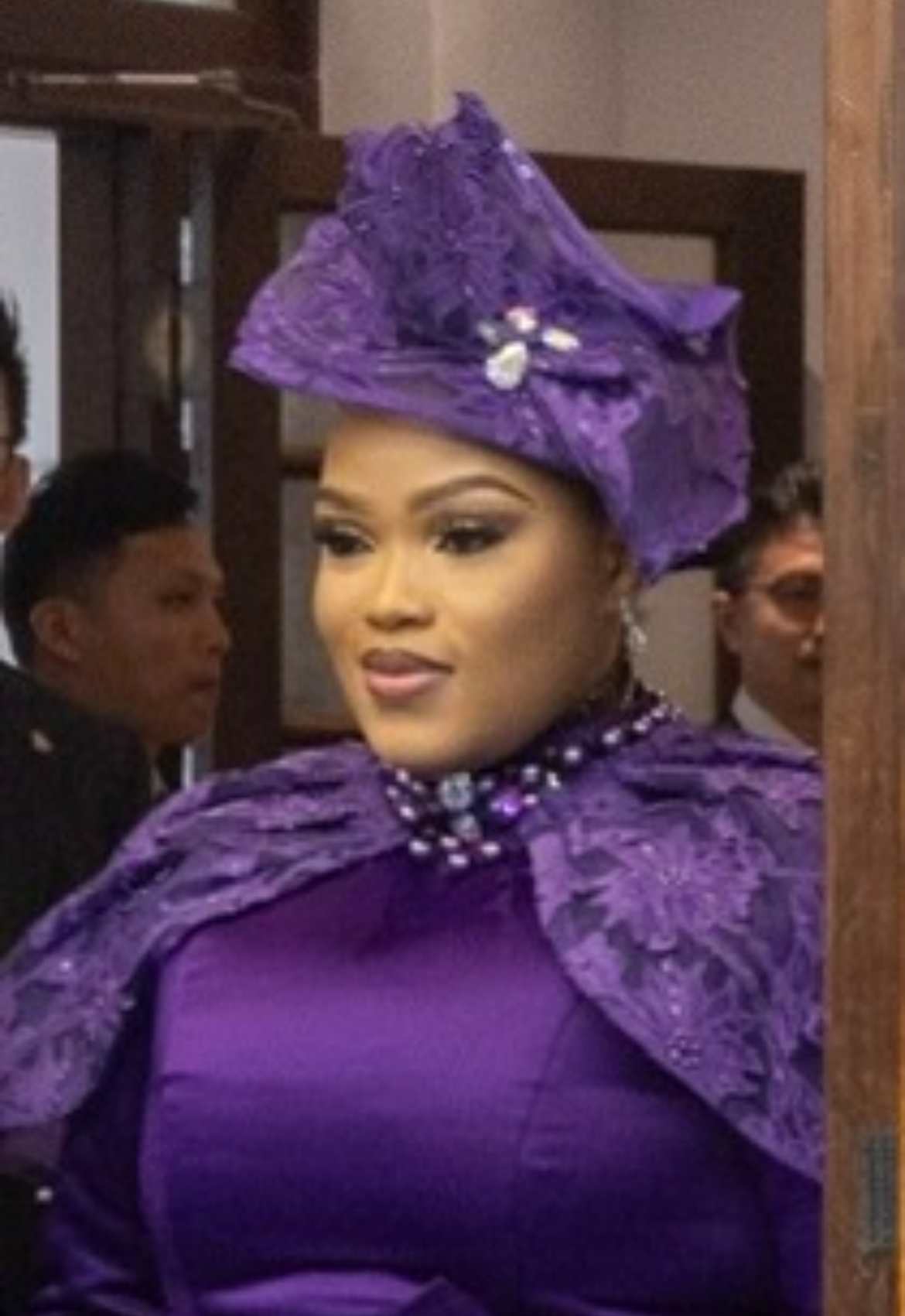
- Inkhosikati LaFogiyane in 2024
- Born: 7 January 1995 (age 31)
- Spouse: Mswati III
- Issue: Princess Ntsandvweni; Princess Nolikhwa
- House: House of Dlamini (by marriage)
- Occupation: beauty pageant contestant

Sindiswa Dlamini (born 7 January 1995) is a Swazi beauty pageant winner and member of the Swazi royal family. In 2016, she was crowned as Miss Cultural Heritage 2016–2017. Dlamini was selected as the fourteenth wife of Mswati III and is known by the title Inkhosikati LaFogiyane.

== Biography ==
Sindiswa Dlamini was born on 7 January 1995. She was educated at St. Francis High School in Mbabane, and graduated in 2012.

She competed in Eswatini's Miss Cultural Heritage Beauty Pageant at The George Hotel in Manzini, going on to the final round of competition. Dlamini was crowned as the winner of the 2016–2017 Miss Cultural Heritage Beauty Pageant on 28 September 2016. Her platform as Miss Cultural Heritage was to promote Swazi culture to youth and encourage them to prioritize their culture. Upon winning the title, she was awarded a five-day trip to Zanzibar, a scholarship, and other prizes.

== Marriage ==
In 2013, while performing at the annual Reed Dance ceremony, Dlamini was selected as a new bride for King Mswati III of Eswatini. Timothy Mtetwa, the Governor of the Ludzidzini Royal Village, announced to the press that the king had taken a new Liphovela (royal fiancée). Mswati III introduced Dlamini to the public during another Reed Dance ceremony. She and Mswati III have two children, Princess Ntsandvweni and Princess Nolikhwa.

International media outlets, outside of Eswatini, reported that Dlamini had been in romantic relationships with two of the king's sons, Prince Majahawonkhe Dlamini and Prince Bandzile Dlamini, prior to their engagement.

She has been reported as the fourteenth wife and the fifteenth wife of Mswati III, and is officially considered his fourteenth wife as another wife left the royal family.
