= Without the King =

2007 documentary film by Michael Skolnik

- Directed by: Michael Skolnik
- Written by: Michael Skolnik
- Produced by: Michael Skolnik
- Starring: Mswati III; Princess Sikhanyiso; Queen LaMbikiza
- Cinematography: James Adolphus
- Edited by: Martha Skolnik
- Release date: 2007
- Running time: 83 minutes
- Languages: English siSwati

Without the King is a 2007 documentary film by Michael Skolnik, an American filmmaker. It follows problems of Swaziland, a landlocked country in southern Africa.

The film features Mswati III, the king of Swaziland, and his daughter and self claimed rapper Princess Sikhanyiso. It shows the angry populace and the country's problems such as a high HIV prevalence, comparing it with the daily life of Mswati III, Africa's last absolute monarch.

The film won a Special Jury Prize from the Best International Feature Documentary award jury at the 2007 Hot Docs Canadian International Documentary Festival.

== Reception ==
On the review aggregator website Rotten Tomatoes, 94% of 18 critics' reviews are positive. Metacritic, which uses a weighted average, assigned the film a score of 55 out of 100, based on 7 critics, indicating "mixed or average" reviews.
