= Umchwasho =

Traditional chastity rite in Eswatini

Umchwasho (Swazi: [umǀʰwaʃo]) is a traditional chastity rite in Eswatini (formerly Swaziland). While the rite is active, unmarried women are not allowed to have sexual relations and must wear a traditional set of tassels. The tassels are usually made of wool and are worn around the neck like a scarf. Girls aged 18 and under must wear blue-and-yellow tassels and are not allowed any physical contact with males. Those aged 19 or over must wear red-and-black tassels and are allowed some physical contact with males but not sexual intercourse. Those that are caught going against umchwasho are fined one animal (typically a cow).

The most recent period of umchwasho ran between 9 September 2001 and 19 August 2005. King Mswati III imposed the ban on sex among the unmarried, in an effort to help stop the spread of HIV and AIDS, which is particularly prevalent in the country. It was originally intended to last five years but was withdrawn one year early without any stated reason, though the ban had faced strong opposition and many women refused to wear the required woollen scarf. The King also drew criticism when he married a teen during the period, fining himself one cow for breaking the rules. When the rite ended, the tassels were burnt in a large ceremony.

== See also ==
- Umhlanga (ceremony)

== Sources ==
- 26 September 2001. "Swazi teens complain about 'unfair' sex ban Archived 2005-05-06 at the Wayback Machine" at IOL.co.za. Accessed 19 August 2005.
- Donovan, Gill (January 11, 2002). "Young women refuse to wear chastity scarf - World - Brief Article". National Catholic Reporter. 38 (10). Archived from the original on March 11, 2007 – via FindArticles.
- 19 August 2005. "Swazi king drops sex-ban tassels " at BBC News. Accessed 19 August 2005.
