= Nothando Hlophe =

Swazi gospel singer

- Inkhosikati LaHlophe of Eswatini
- Born: 4 November 1989 (age 36)
- Spouse: Prince Majahonkhe Dlamini (2021–present)
- Issue: Prince Alakhiwelivelemaswati Dlamini
- House: House of Dlamini (by marriage)
- Religion: Christianity
- Education: Phumelele High School
- Occupation: gospel singer

Nothando Hlophe (born 4 November 1989) is a Swazi gospel singer and member of the Swazi royal family. She was a member of the gospel and worship musical group Women in Praise until she broke out as a solo artist, releasing her debut solo album in 2016. In 2019, Hlophe won Female Artist of the Year, Best Gospel Artist, and Song of the Year at the 3rd Annual MTN SWAMA Awards. From 2019 to 2022, she took a hiatus from her music career. During her hiatus, she married Prince Majahonkhe Dlamini, a son of Mswati III, becoming a member of the Swazi royal family with the title Inkhosikati LaHlophe. Hlophe returned to performing in 2022 with the launch of a live album and a performance at The Great Revival in Mbabane.

== Early life ==
Nothando Hlophe was born on 4 November 1989 and grew up in Manzini and Lobamba. Prior to beginning her music career, she worked as a personal assistant at Explicit Design. Hlophe attended St. Andrew's Primary School and St. Mary's Primary School and graduated from Phumelele High School in 2009.

== Career ==
Hlophe began singing as a Sunday school student at Lobamba Christian Fellowship Church.

In 2008, she joined the Gospel Challenge as one of four hundred contestants, and finished in seventh place. Later that year, she performed with Redeem Child as an opening act for Joyous Celebration. She then worked as a backing vocalist for Frans Dlamini, Banele Dlamini, and God's Property. Later, she became a member of the musical group Women in Praise, which is operated under the Spirit Music Group. As part of Women in Praise, she took part in creating the live album of Women in Praise: Live in Swaziland, including the songs Khulula ugcobo and Sekukaningi. In May 2016, she released her debut solo album Impilo Yami.

In October 2016, she performed at Swazi Gospel Night, with featured gospel artists from all over Eswatini.

She is the vocalist for the gospel band Khululugcobo.

In 2019, she won Female Artist of the Year, Best Gospel Artist, and Song of the Year, for her single Yebo, at the 3rd annual MTN SWAMA Awards. Later that year, she took a hiatus from performing and recording music due to the COVID-19 pandemic.

She announced her return to performing in February 2022, and performed at The Great Revival at Mbabane Alliance Church in Mbabane on 3 March 2022 alongside Takie Ndou, Sneazy Msomi, Nduduzo Matse, Sbua Noah, Linda Dlamini, and Portia Praise. She announced her third album that year. Hlophe launched her live album that same year at the Soweto Theatre in Soweto, South Africa.

She is expected to perform at the MTN iPraise Gospel Music Festival on 29 July 2023 at Mavuso Trade Centre in Manzini.

== Personal life ==
In September 2019, she became engaged to Prince Majahonkhe Dlamini, son of King Mswati III of Eswatini and his second wife, Inkhosikati LaMotsa. While they were engaged, she gave birth to their son, Prince Alakhiwelivelemaswati Dlamini, on 16 June 2020. Her son is the eighth grandchild of Mswati III. Hlophe and Prince Majahonkhe were officially married on 19 September 2021. She is Prince Majahonkhe's first and senior wife and is known as Inkhosikati LaHlophe.

== Awards ==
Year	Award Ceremony	Prize	Work/Recipient	Result
2019	MTN SWAMA Awards	Female Artist of the Year	Nothando Hlophe	Won
2019	MTN SWAMA Awards	Best Gospel Artist	Nothando Hlophe	Won
2019	MTN SWAMA Awards	Song of the Year	Yebo	Won
