= Nothando Dube =

Swazi royalty (1988–2019)

Queen consort (Inkhosikati) of Eswatini
- Tenure: 2005–2019
- Born: Nothando Dube; 6 February 1988
- Died: 8 March 2019 (aged 31); South Africa
- Spouse: Mswati III
- Issue: Princess Makhosothando Dlamini; Prince Betive Dlamini; Princess Mahlemalangeni Dlamini
- House: House of Dlamini (by marriage)

Nothando Dube, known as Inkhosikati LaDube, (6 February 1988– 8 March 2019) was a member of the House of Dlamini as the twelfth Inkhosikati (Queen consort) and wife of King Mswati III of Eswatini.

== Biography ==
Nothando Dube was a former Miss Teen Swaziland. Dube attended Mater Dorolosa High School. She met Mswati III, the king of Eswatini, in 2004 at a birthday party he hosted for one of his children. He chose her as his new bride during a reed dance she, along with thousands of other Eswatini women, performed at Ludzidzini Royal Village.

=== Life as a consort ===
In 2005 she married Mswati III, becoming his twelfth wife, when she was sixteen years old. She gave birth to three children. In 2010 she had an affair with justice minister Ndumiso Mamba, for which she was reportedly placed under house arrest. She filed complaints of abuse and torture at the hands of the king's guards. After a year under house arrest, she was banished from the royal household and prevented from seeing her children.

=== Death ===
She died on 8 March 2019 at a hospital in South Africa from skin cancer. Her death was officially announced by Governor Lusendvo Fakudze through the Eswatini Broadcasting and Information Service. She was buried on 11 March 2019.
