= Phesheya Mbongeni Dlamini =

Swazi diplomat

Phesheya Mbongeni Dlamini (born 1 January 1966 in Lobamba) is a Swazi statesman who has served as the Ambassador and Permanent Representative of Swaziland to the United Nations since 8 September 2005. Previously, he had been Swaziland's Attorney-General in the Ministry of Justice and Constitutional Development since 1999, as well as Chairman of the Legal Group of the Eastern and Southern African Anti-Money Laundering Group from 2003 to 2005.
