= Mswati III =

King of Eswatini since 1986

- Ngwenyama
- Mswati in 2026

King of Eswatini
- Reign: 25 April 1986 – present
- Coronation: 25 April 1986
- Predecessor: Sobhuza II
- Queen Mother: Ntfombi
- Born: Makhosetive Dlamini; 19 April 1968 (age 58); Raleigh Fitkin Memorial Hospital, Manzini, Swaziland Protectorate
- Spouses: 16 wives concurrently: Nomsah Matsebula; Sindi Motsa; Sibonelo Mngometulu; LaNgangaza (Carol Dlamini) (m. 1987); Putsoana Hwala; Delisa Magwaza (m. 1993); LaGija (Angela Dlamini) (m. 1998); Senteni Masango (m. 2000; died 2018); Nontsetselo Magongo (m. 2002); Zena Mahlangu (m. 2002); Noliqhwa Ayanda Ntentesa (m. 2005); Nothando Dube (m. 2005; died 2019); Phindile Nkambule (m. 2007); Sindiswa Dlamini (m. 2012); Siphelele Mashwama (m. 2019); Nomcebo Zuma (m. 2024)
- House: Dlamini
- Father: Sobhuza II
- Mother: Ntfombi Tfwala
- Religion: Christianity

Mswati III (born Makhosetive Dlamini; 19 April 1968) is King of Eswatini, reigning since 1986. He is the head of an absolute monarchy, holding executive authority over all branches of government and constitutionally immune from prosecution. Along with his mother Queen Ntfombi, Mswati is the last remaining absolute monarch in Africa and one of twelve remaining absolute monarchs worldwide.

Under the constitution, the king is commander-in-chief of the defence force and commissioner-in-chief of police and correctional services, and exercises influence over local government through traditional chiefs. In 2018, Mswati promulgated a decree renaming the country from Swaziland to Eswatini, restoring its pre-colonial name. Political activism and dissent are regulated under laws including those against sedition. Protests calling for political reform from 2021 onwards were dispersed and a number of activists were arrested.

Eswatini faces significant economic challenges: in 2022, an estimated 32% of the population lived below the US$2.15/day international poverty line (measured by purchasing power parity in 2017) while 55% fell below the lower-middle-income country threshold of $3.65/day. The government exercises influence over state broadcast media, while a growing number of independent online outlets operate in the country.

== Early life ==
Mswati III was born Makhosetive Dlamini on 19 April 1968 at Raleigh Fitkin Memorial Hospital, Manzini, as the son of Sobhuza II (who had 70 wives during his life of 82 years) and Ntfombi.

When King Sobhuza II died on 21 August 1982, the Great Council of State (the Liqoqo) selected the 14-year-old prince Makhosetive to be the next king.

== Reign ==
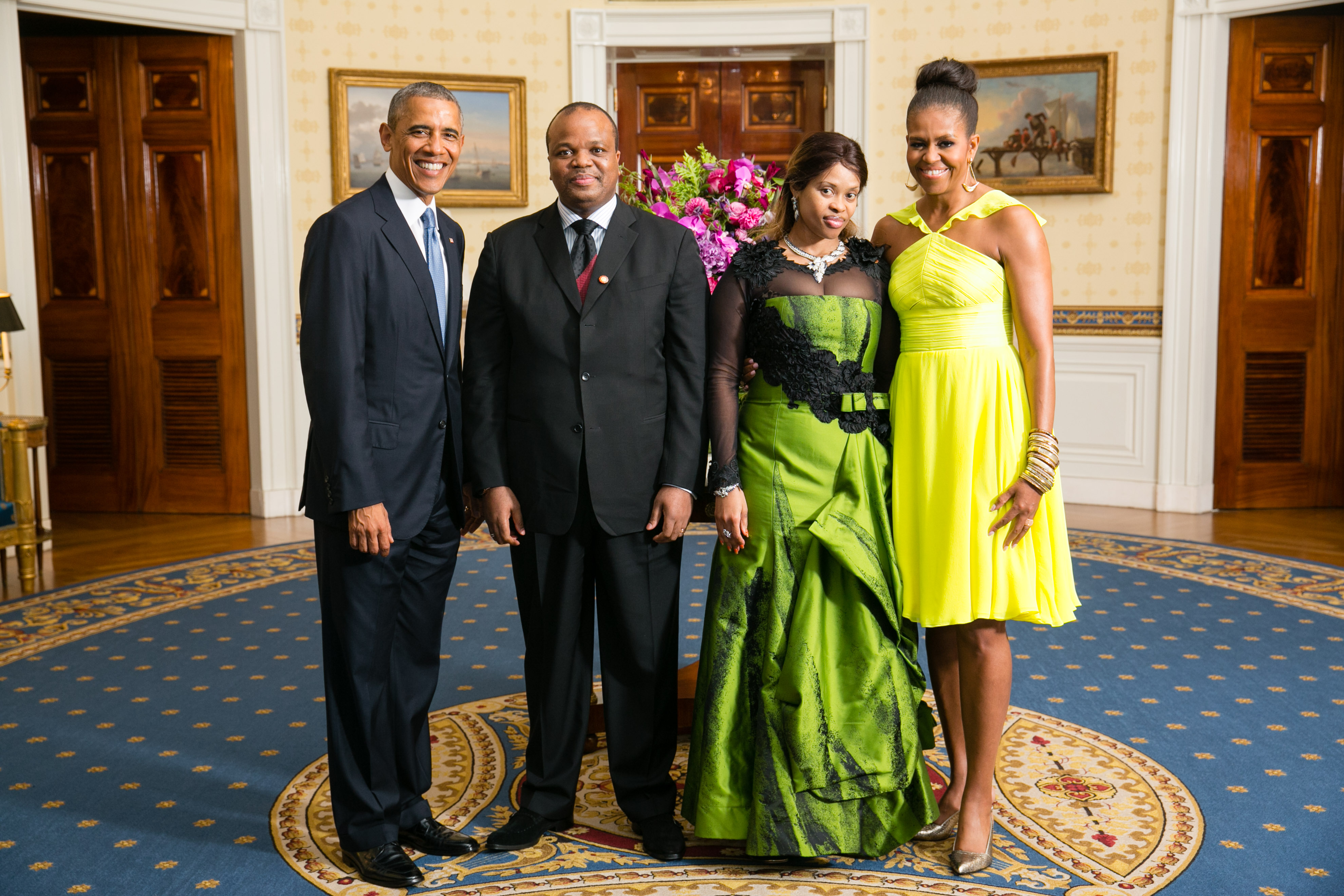
Mswati and Sibonelo Mngometulu with US President Barack Obama on 5 August 2014

Mswati was introduced as crown prince in September 1983 and was crowned king on 25 April 1986, six days after turning 18, making him the youngest reigning monarch in the world at the time. He inherited an absolute monarchy from his father, who had ruled by decree since 1973 and banned all political parties.

Mswati III is Africa's last absolute monarch in the sense that he has the power to choose the prime minister, other top government posts and top traditional posts. Despite his role in appointing such positions, Mswati is still required to get special advice from the queen mother and council when choosing positions such as prime minister; similarly, in matters of cabinet appointments, Mswati is advised by the prime minister. Mswati ruled by decree, but he chose to restore the nation's Parliament, which had been dissolved by his father in order to ensure concentration of power remained with the king. Parliamentarians are appointed either by Mswati himself (two-thirds of the senators and ten deputies) or elected by traditional chiefs close to power. Close to the evangelical churches, he banned divorce and the wearing of miniskirts.

In an attempt to mitigate the HIV/AIDS pandemic in 2001, the king used his traditional powers to invoke a time-honoured chastity rite (umcwasho) under the patronage of a princess, which encouraged all Swazi maidens to abstain from sexual relations for five years. This was last done under Sobhuza II in 1971. This rite banned sexual relations for Swazis under 18 years of age from 9 September 2001 to 19 August 2005. However, two months after imposing the ban, Mswati violated the decree by choosing a 17-year-old liphovela (royal fiancée) as one of his wives.

In 2005, Mswati promulgated a new constitution, ending the state of emergency that had been in force since 1973. The constitution allows for freedom of speech and assembly; according to Amnesty International, however, such freedoms are restricted in practice.

On 19 April 2018, Mswati changed the name of the country from Swaziland to Eswatini to mark the year of its 50th anniversary of independence. The name change coincided with his 50th birthday. Eswatini is the ancient, original name for the country, chosen as a departure from its colonial past.

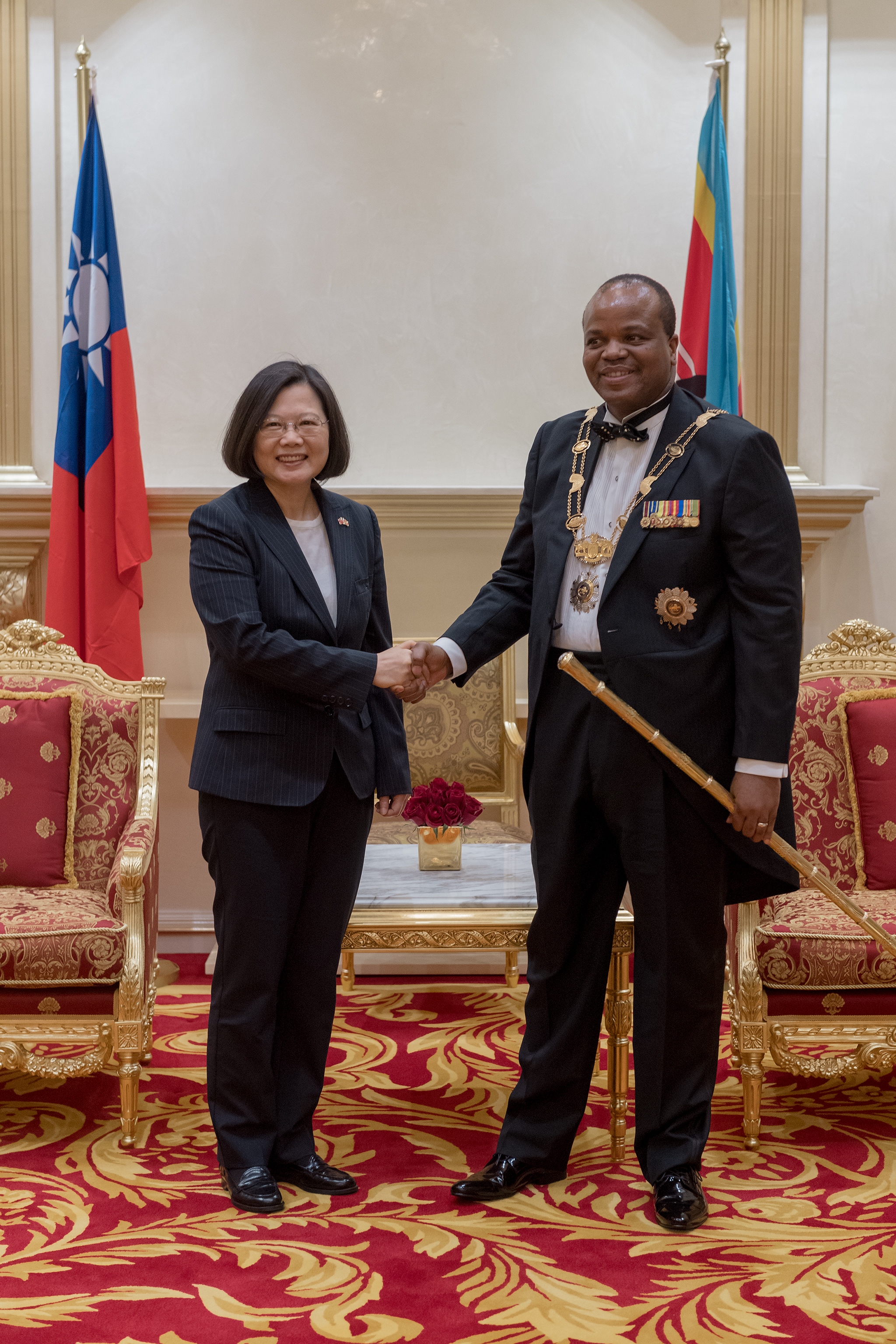
Mswati and Taiwanese President Tsai Ing-wen in Eswatini on 17 April 2018

Mswati has visited Taiwan seventeen times as of June 2018, and has pledged to continue recognizing Taiwan instead of the People's Republic of China.

Eswatini is predominantly rural and is one of the poorest countries in the world (63% of its population lives below the poverty line). An economic circle of 15,000 businessmen and politicians controls most of the country's wealth. This circle includes South African investors who have come to Eswatini to find labour at one-third the cost and a group of white businessmen who are heirs to the British settlers.

In January 2021, Mswati contracted COVID-19, and he later thanked Taiwan for providing antiviral medication that helped with his recovery. Mswati did not disclose that he had been hospitalized until after his recovery.

In June 2021, a series of protests broke out against authoritarianism and the suppression of opposition. The Communist Party of Swaziland alleged he had fled to South Africa on the night of 28–29 June, whereas the Swaziland Solidarity Network claimed he fled to Mozambique. Both of these claims were denied by acting prime minister Themba Nhlanganiso Masuku.

=== Ruby Jubilee (2026) ===
On 25 April 2026, King Mswati III marked 40 years on the throne, his Ruby Jubilee, at a ceremony held at Somhlolo National Stadium in Lobamba, attended by foreign heads of state. Lesotho's King Letsie III led tributes on behalf of visiting dignitaries, describing the 40-year reign as a testament to selfless leadership and devotion to the Swazi people, and commending Mswati for guiding the kingdom through complex political, social and economic challenges over four decades.

==== Healthcare ====
King Mswati III highlighted a substantial transformation in Eswatini's healthcare system over his reign, noting that the country had grown from approximately six hospitals and 162 clinics in the 1990s to 16 hospitals and over 330 health facilities by 2026, with a stated goal that no citizen should have to travel more than eight kilometres for health services. Life expectancy in Eswatini rose from 32 years in 1986 to 65 years in 2026 according to figures cited during the Ruby Jubilee address.

Eswatini became one of the first countries in the world to reach the UNAIDS 95-95-95 target, meaning 95 percent of people living with HIV know their status, 95 percent of those are on treatment, and 95 percent of those on treatment are virally suppressed, well ahead of the 2030 global deadline. The King also announced that Eswatini was the first country in Africa to adopt lenacapavir, a long-acting injectable HIV prevention drug, and that mother-to-child HIV transmission had been brought below five percent. On malaria, the King noted that Eswatini pioneered the End Malaria Fund initiative, launched in 2019, under which malaria cases dropped significantly. Social welfare gains cited during the period included the introduction of monthly grants and free healthcare for elderly citizens and people with disabilities, alongside a national housing programme and old-age homes.

==== Ezulwini Palazzo ====
On 26 April 2026, King Mswati III officially opened the International Convention Centre (ICC) in Ezulwini, naming the facility Ezulwini Palazzo as part of the Ruby Jubilee celebrations. The opening brought together regional heads of state and dignitaries including South African President Cyril Ramaphosa, Lesotho's King Letsie III, King Misuzulu kaZwelithini of the Zulu Nation, Taiwan's Foreign Minister Lin Chia-lung, former Botswana President Ian Khama, former South African President Jacob Zuma and former Democratic Republic of the Congo President Joseph Kabila.

=== Taiwan relations (2026) ===
In May 2026, King Mswati III received Taiwan President Lai Ching-te at Mandvulo Grand Hall, with the two governments signing a Joint Communique to strengthen trade and cooperation between Eswatini and Taiwan. The visit followed a diplomatic standoff in which China pressured several African countries, including Seychelles, Mauritius and Madagascar, to revoke airspace permits for Lai's aircraft, forcing the cancellation of an earlier trip that had been scheduled for 22 to 26 April 2026 to coincide with the King's Ruby Jubilee celebrations. The trip was rescheduled after what Lai described as careful arrangements by diplomatic and national security teams. In response, China removed tariffs for all African countries while excluding Eswatini from the arrangement. Eswatini remains Taiwan's only diplomatic ally on the African continent and one of just 12 states globally that maintain formal diplomatic relations with Taipei.

== Family and succession ==
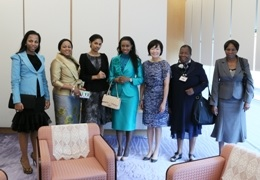
Some of Mswati's wives with Akie Abe, wife of then-Prime Minister of Japan Shinzo Abe, in 2013

As of 2024, Mswati had eleven wives in polygamous marriage and was thought to have twenty children. The first two wives were chosen for him by national councillors. There are complex rules on succession. Traditionally the king is chosen through his mother as represented in the Swazi saying Inkhosi, yinkhosi ngenina, meaning "a king is king through his mother".

== Controversies ==
Mswati's reign has seen a number of constitutional and governmental changes, including the adoption of the 2005 constitution. Critics, including the People's United Democratic Movement (PUDEMO) have argued that these changes were intended to strengthen and perpetuate the traditional order. His attendance at the May 2012 Sovereign Monarchs lunch, to celebrate the Diamond Jubilee of Queen Elizabeth II, drew criticism from human rights campaigners over concerns about his government's human rights record.

Human rights reports by the United States Department of State have documented allegations of abuses by security forces during Mswati's reign, including torture, excessive use of force, extrajudicial killings, arbitrary arrest and detention, and unlawful searches and seizures of homes and property. The reports also described restrictions on freedom of speech, assembly and association, harassment of activists and journalists, and discrimination against groups including LGBT people, labour leaders and campaigners against child labour. According to the reports, the courts took little or no action against officials responsible for abuses.

Mswati has faced accusations in international media that women were abducted to become his wives, most prominently in the case of Zena Mahlangu. In 2000, he was reported to have called for parliament to debate whether HIV-positive people should be "sterilized and branded".

=== Wealth ===
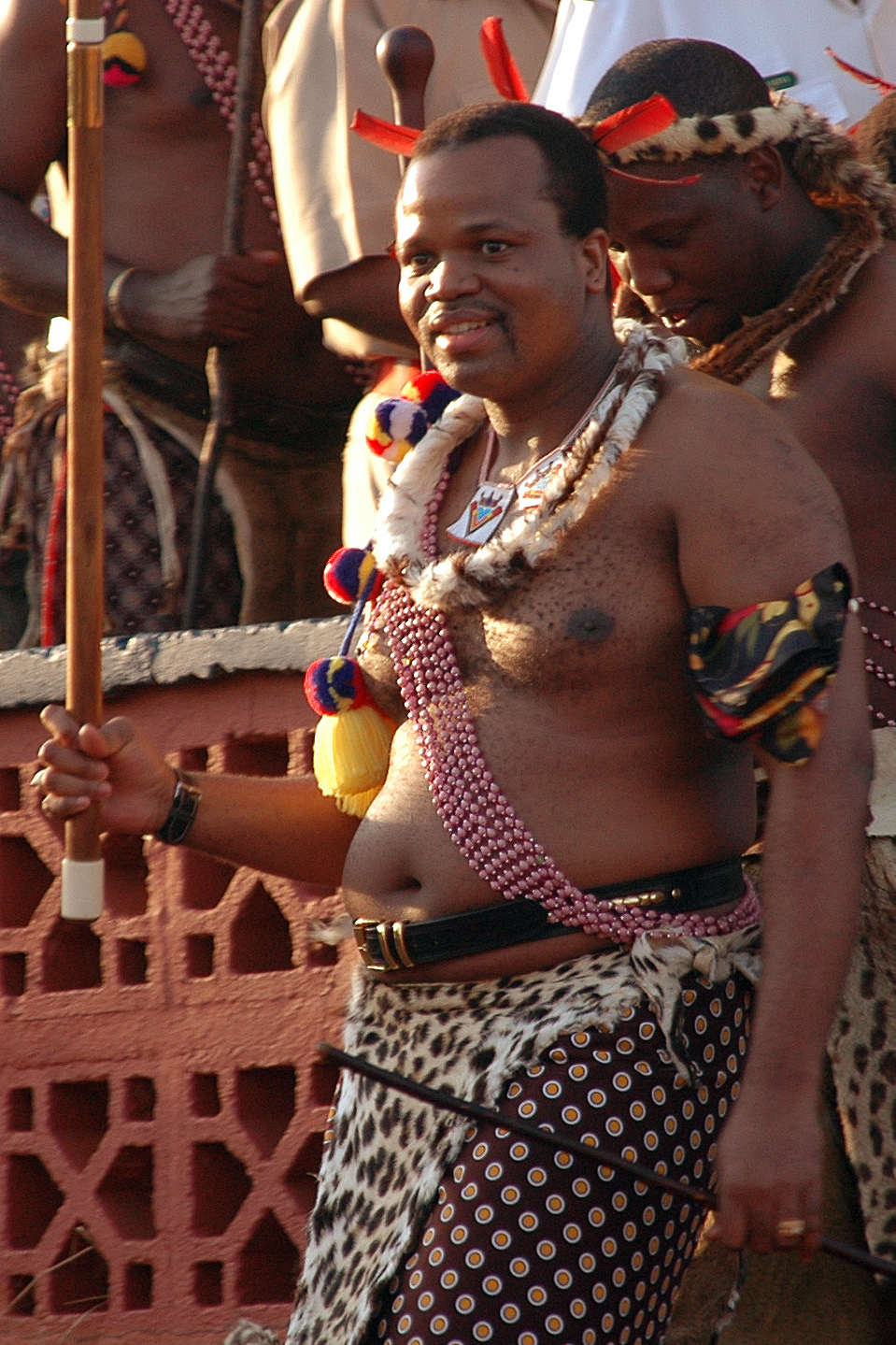
King Mswati at the Reed Dance 2006

Mswati's personal and household spending has attracted criticism, particularly in the media, with some reports contrasting his lifestyle with the level of poverty in the country. In the 2014 national budget, parliament allocated US$61 million to the royal household, at a time when, according to the United Nations Development Programme, 63% of the population lived on less than US$1.25 per day. Photography of the King's vehicles was banned following criticism of his purchase of luxury cars, including a DaimlerChrysler Maybach 62 reported to cost US$500,000. Forbes estimated his personal wealth at US$200 million in its 2009 list of the world's richest royals. In January 2004, the Times of Swaziland reported that the King had asked the government to spend about US$15 million to renovate three main palaces and build new residences for each of his thirteen wives. The Prime Minister's Office responded in a statement describing the report as "reckless and untrue", saying the proposal was for the construction of five State Houses rather than palaces, at a cost of €19.9 million. Later that year, approval was given for five new buildings at a cost of more than US$4 million in public funds. In August 2008, hundreds of women marched through Mbabane to protest the cost of an overseas shopping trip taken by nine of the King's thirteen wives. The demonstration was organised by Positive Living, a non-governmental organisation for Swazi women with AIDS, and protesters presented a petition to the Minister of Finance arguing that the money should have been spent differently.

According to the International Consortium of Investigative Journalists, Mswati owns a collection of bespoke watches worth millions of US dollars.

Mswati holds personal stakes in a large portion of Eswatini's economy, which the Daily Maverick identified as a factor in the country's below-average economic growth among Sub-Saharan African countries. As an absolute monarch, he has the power to dissolve parties and to veto any legislation passed by parliament.

=== LaMahlangu controversy ===
According to Amnesty International, Zena Mahlangu, then an 18-year-old high school student, disappeared from her school in October 2002. Her mother, Lindiwe Dlamini, reported to police that her daughter had been taken by two men, Qethuka Sgombeni Dlamini and Tulujani Sikhondze. She was later told that her daughter was at Ludzidzini Royal Village and was being prepared to become the King's next wife.

Under custom, a liphovela (royal fiancée) must not be a twin; Mahlangu has a twin brother, which reports noted would ordinarily make her ineligible. Her mother took the matter to the High Court, where Attorney General Phesheya Dlamini intervened in the case.

== Honours ==
Royal standard of Mswati III

=== National ===
- Grand Master of the Royal Order of King Sobhuza II (1986)
- Grand Master of the Royal Order of the Great She-Elephant (2002)
- Grand Master of the Royal Order of the Crown (2002)
- Grand Master of the Royal Family Order of Mswati III (2002)
- Grand Master of the Military Order of Swaziland (2002)
- Grand Master of the Order of the Elephant (2018)

=== Foreign ===
- United Kingdom: Knight of the Venerable Order of St John (11 November 1991)
- South Africa: Knight Grand Cross of the Order of Good Hope (August 1995)

== See also ==
- Without the King, 2007 documentary film featuring Mswati III and his daughter Princess Sikhanyiso.

== Bibliography ==
- Ginidza, Zodwa R. (1986). Umntfwana!: A Pictorial Biography of the New King of Swaziland. Swaziland: Macmillan Swaziland National Pub. Co. ISBN 978-0-333-40303-7 OCLC 16874145
- Levin, Richard and Hugh MacMillan. (2003). "Swaziland: Recent History," in Africa South of the Sahara 2004. London: Routledge. ISBN 978-1-85743-183-4
- Simelane, Hamilton Sipho. (2005). "Swaziland: Reign of Mswati III," pp. 1528-1530, in Encyclopedia of African History, Kevin Shillington, ed. London: CRC Press. ISBN 978-1-57958-245-6

Regnal titles
Preceded by Ntfombi as regent	King of Eswatini; 1986–present	Incumbent
