= Ludzidzini Royal Village =

Home to the royal family of Eswatini

Coordinates: 26.4597°S 31.2012°E

The Ludzidzini Royal Residence (Swazi: Sigodlo Saseludzidzini) is the home to the House of Dlamini, the royal family of Eswatini, currently led by Ngwenyama (King) Mswati III (born 1968) and Ndlovukati (Queen Mother) Ntfombi (born 1949). The village is also known for the annual Umhlanga reed dance ceremony. It is currently the royal residence and the administrative headquarters of the Queen Mother Ntfombi Tfwala. Jim Gama served as its governor.
