= House of Dlamini =

Reigning dynasty in Eswatini

- Coat of arms of Eswatini
- Parent house: House of Langa
- Country: Eswatini
- Founded: 16th century
- Founder: Dlamini I
- Current head: Mswati III
- Titles: King of Eswatini; Queen Mother of Eswatini; Ndlovukazi Mhlekazi; Nkhosi

The House of Dlamini is the royal house of the Kingdom of Eswatini. Mswati III, as king and Ngwenyama of Eswatini, is the current head of the house of Dlamini. Swazi kings up to the present day are referred to as Ingwenyama and they rule together with the Queen Mother who is called Indlovukati. The Swazi kings, like other Nguni nations, practice polygamy and thus have many wives and children.

== Foundations ==
The Dlamini dynasty traces itself back to a chief Dlamini I (also known as Matalatala), who is said to have migrated with the Swazi people from East Africa through Tanzania and Mozambique. Ngwane III, however, is often considered to be the first King of modern Eswatini, who ruled from 1745 to 1780. In the early years of the Dlamini dynasty, the people and the country in which they resided was called Ngwane, after Ngwane III.

In the early 19th century, the Dlamini centre of power shifted to the central part of Eswatini, known as Ezulwini valley. This occurred during the rule of Sobhuza I. In the south of the country (present day Shiselweni), tensions between the Ngwane and the Ndwandwe led to armed conflict. To escape this conflict, Sobhuza moved his royal capital to Zombodze. In this process, he conquered many of the earlier inhabitants of the country, thereby incorporating them under his rule. Later on, Sobhuza was able to strategically avoid conflict with the powerful Zulu kingdom which was now ruling in the south of the Pongola River. The Dlamini dynasty grew in strength and ruled over a large country encompassing the whole of present Eswatini during this time.

== The royal family ==
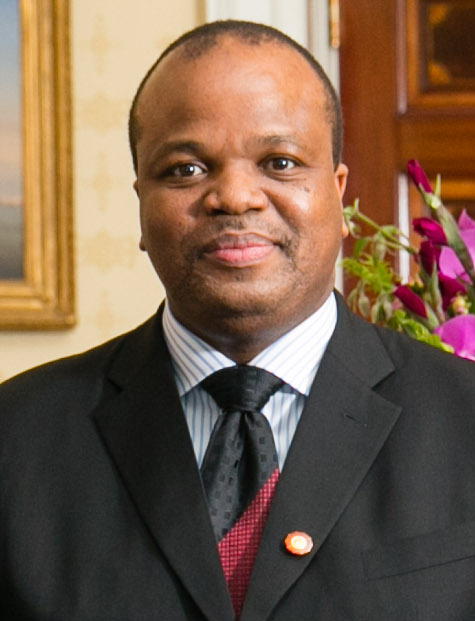
Mswati III, incumbent king of Eswatini

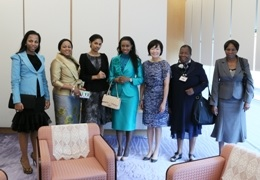
Some of the king's wives meeting the wife of the Japanese prime minister in 2013

The royal family includes the king, the queen mother, the king's wives (emakhosikati), the king's children, as well as the king's siblings, the king's half-siblings and their families. Due to the practice of polygamy, the number of people who can be counted as members of the royal family is relatively large. For example, King Mswati III is thought to have over 200 brothers and sisters.

Members of the royal family, including the king himself, have courted both internal and international controversy. The king and his household have been criticized for their lavish spending in a country with high poverty rates. Reports have claimed that the king's large number of spouses and children "take up a huge chunk of the [national] budget" and that "the royal family seems to live in its own world that is totally unaffected by the country's struggles".

The king's siblings include Mantfombi Dlamini, the Queen of the Zulus of South Africa, while one of his in-laws is Princess Zenani Mandela-Dlamini, a member of the Mandela chieftaincy family of Mvezo, South Africa.

Several members of the royal family have been educated abroad: King Mswati III spent several years at Sherborne School, in Dorset, England, and his eldest daughter Sikhanyiso Dlamini has studied at St Edmund's College, Ware, in Hertfordshire, and Biola University, in California, United States.

The current official residence of the royal family is the Ludzindzini Palace in Lobamba; other royal palaces exist for the queen consorts. He has received criticism for his "lavish" spending habits.

== See also ==
- Chief of Embhuleni
- Succession to the Swazi throne
- List of monarchs of Eswatini
- Ndlovukati
