= Umhlanga (ceremony) =

Annual Swazi women's ritual

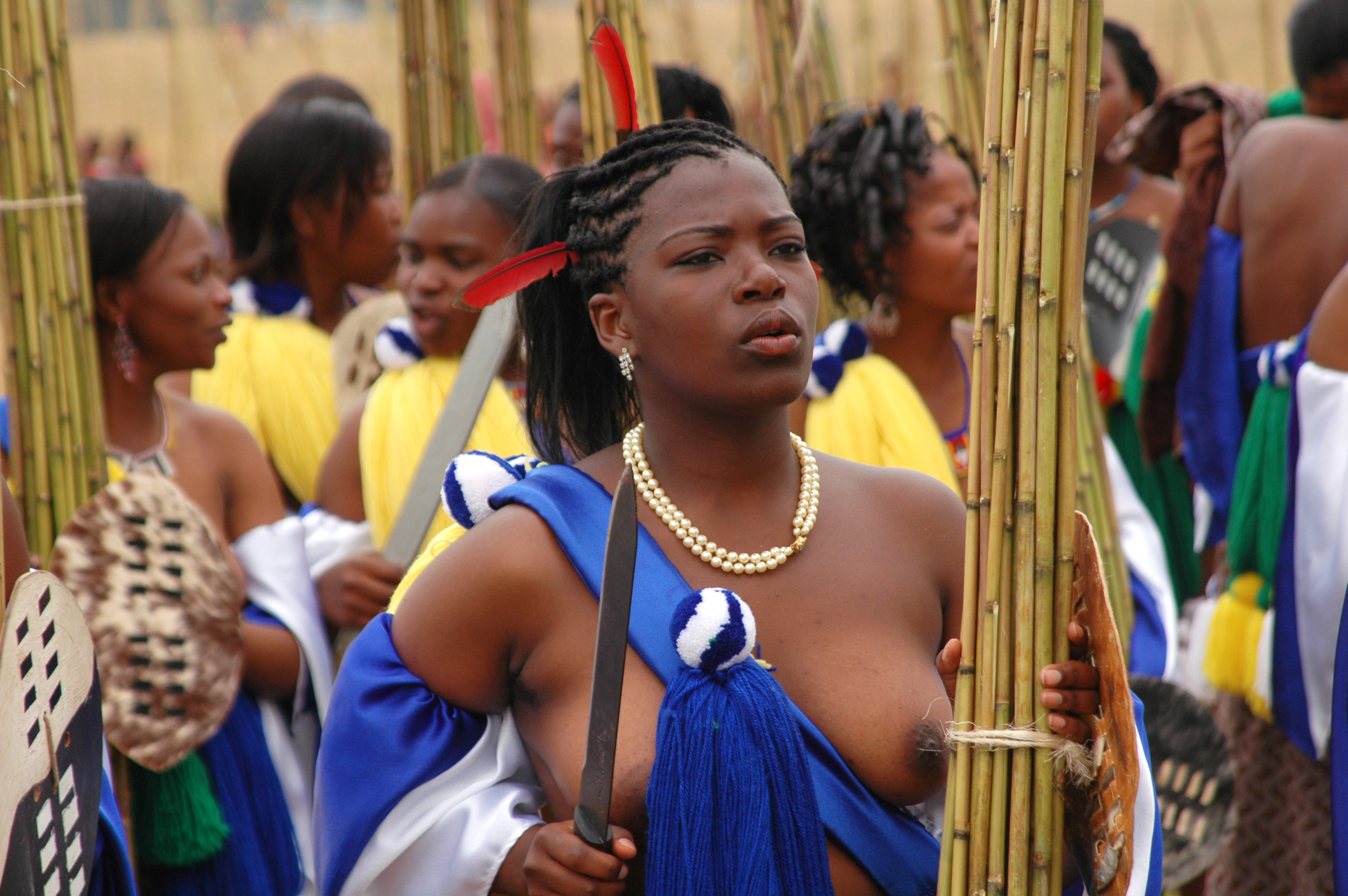
A woman at the Reed Dance ceremony

Umhlanga (Swazi and Zulu pronunciation [um̩ɬaːŋɡa]), also known as the Reed Dance, is an annual Swazi event that takes place at the end of August or at the beginning of September. In Eswatini, tens of thousands of unmarried and childless Swazi girls and women travel from the various chiefdoms to the Ludzidzini Royal Village to participate in the eight-day event.

Today’s Reed Dance is a revival of the older "umcwasho" custom. Under that practice, unmarried girls were grouped into age-regiments. If a woman had become pregnant outside marriage, her family paid a cow to the local chief.

== Eswatini ==
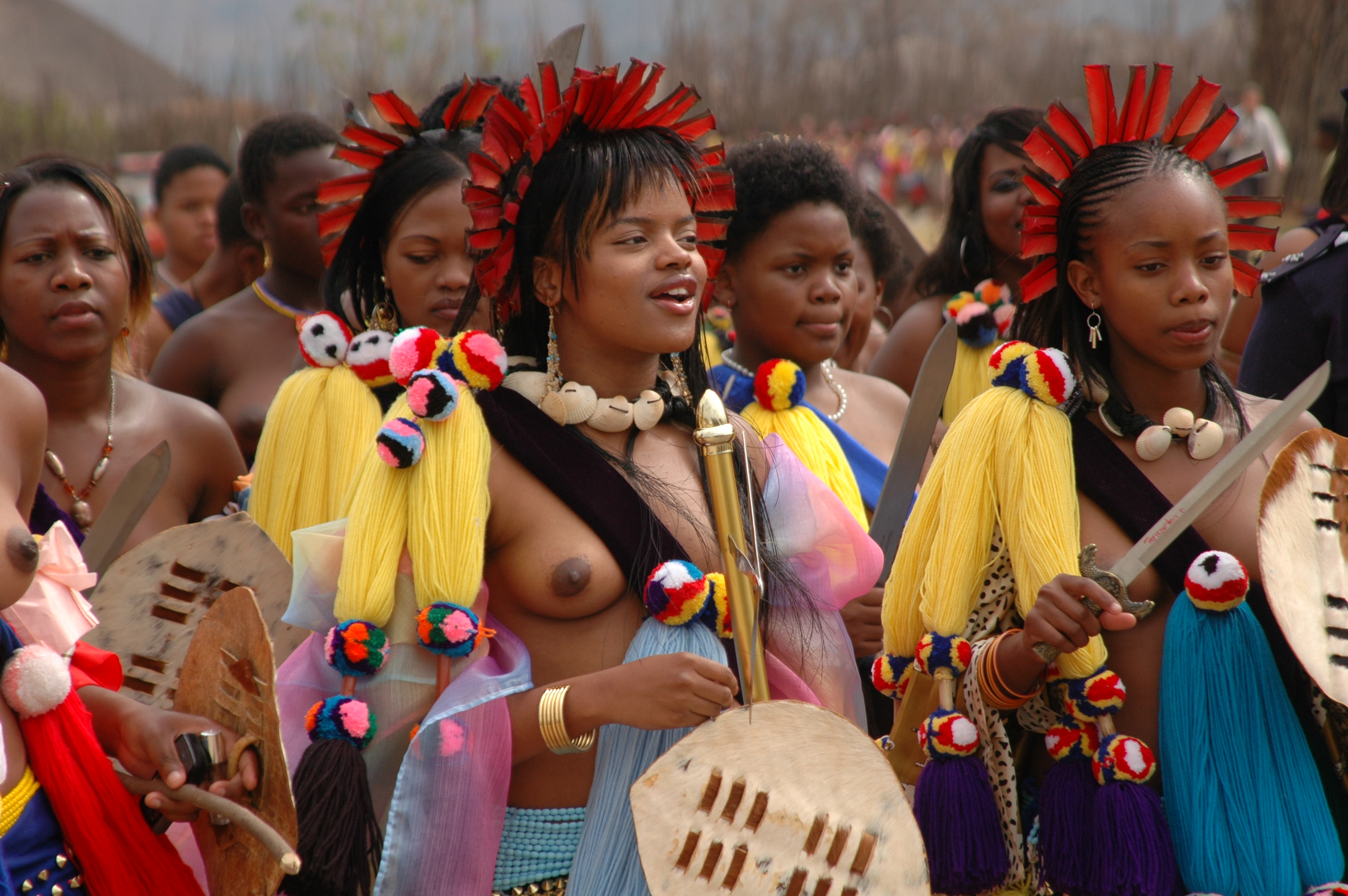
Princess Sikhanyiso Dlamini (centre), dancing at the 2006 Umhlanga. She wears a red feather crown, distinguishing her as a royal.

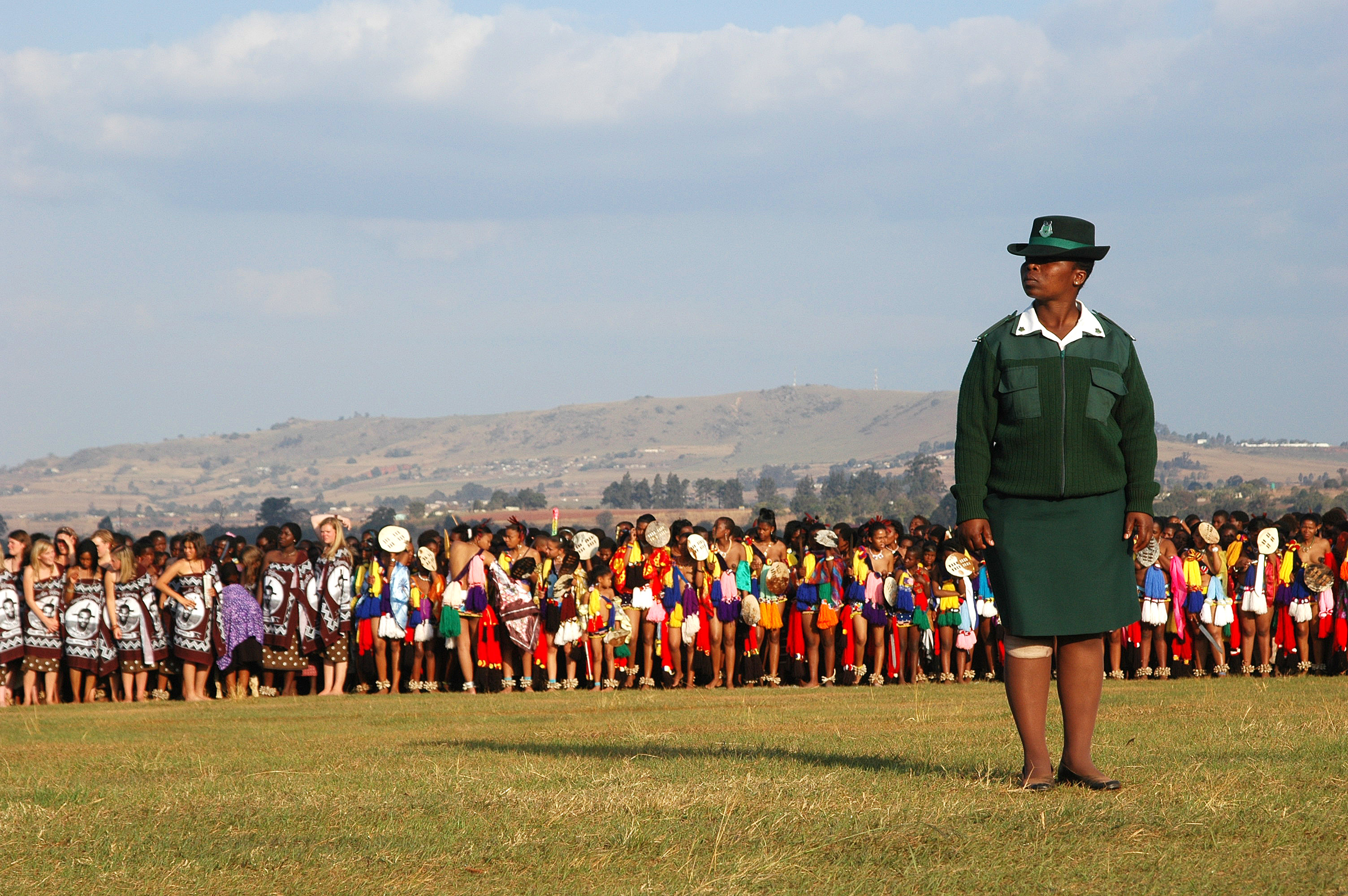
The 2006 Reed Dance in Lobamba

Umhlanga was created in Eswatini in the 1940s under the rule of Sobhuza II, and is an adaptation of the much older Umchwasho ceremony.

In Eswatini, girls begin the rite by gathering at the Queen Mother's royal village, which currently is Ludzidzini Royal Village. After arriving at the Queen Mother's residence, the women disperse the following night to surrounding areas and cut tall reeds. The following night, they bundle the reeds together and bring them back to the Queen Mother to be used in repairing holes in the reed windscreen surrounding the royal village.

After a day of rest and washing, the women prepare their traditional costumes consisting of a bead necklace, rattling anklets made from cocoons, a sash, and skirt. Many of them carry the bush knives, which they had earlier used to cut the reeds, as symbols of their virginity. Afterwards, they sing and dance as they parade in front of the royal family as well as a crowd of dignitaries, spectators, and tourists. After the parade, groups from select villages take to the centre of the field and put on a special performance for the crowd. The King's many daughters and royal princesses also participate in the reed dance ceremony and are distinguished by the crown of red feathers they wear in their hair.

The present form of the Reed Dance developed in the 1940s from the Umcwasho custom, where young girls were placed in age regiments to ensure their virginity. Once they had reached marriageable age, they would perform labour for the Queen Mother followed by dancing and a feast. The official purpose of the annual ceremony is to preserve the women's chastity, provide tribute labour for the Queen Mother, and produce solidarity among the women through working together.

== South Africa ==
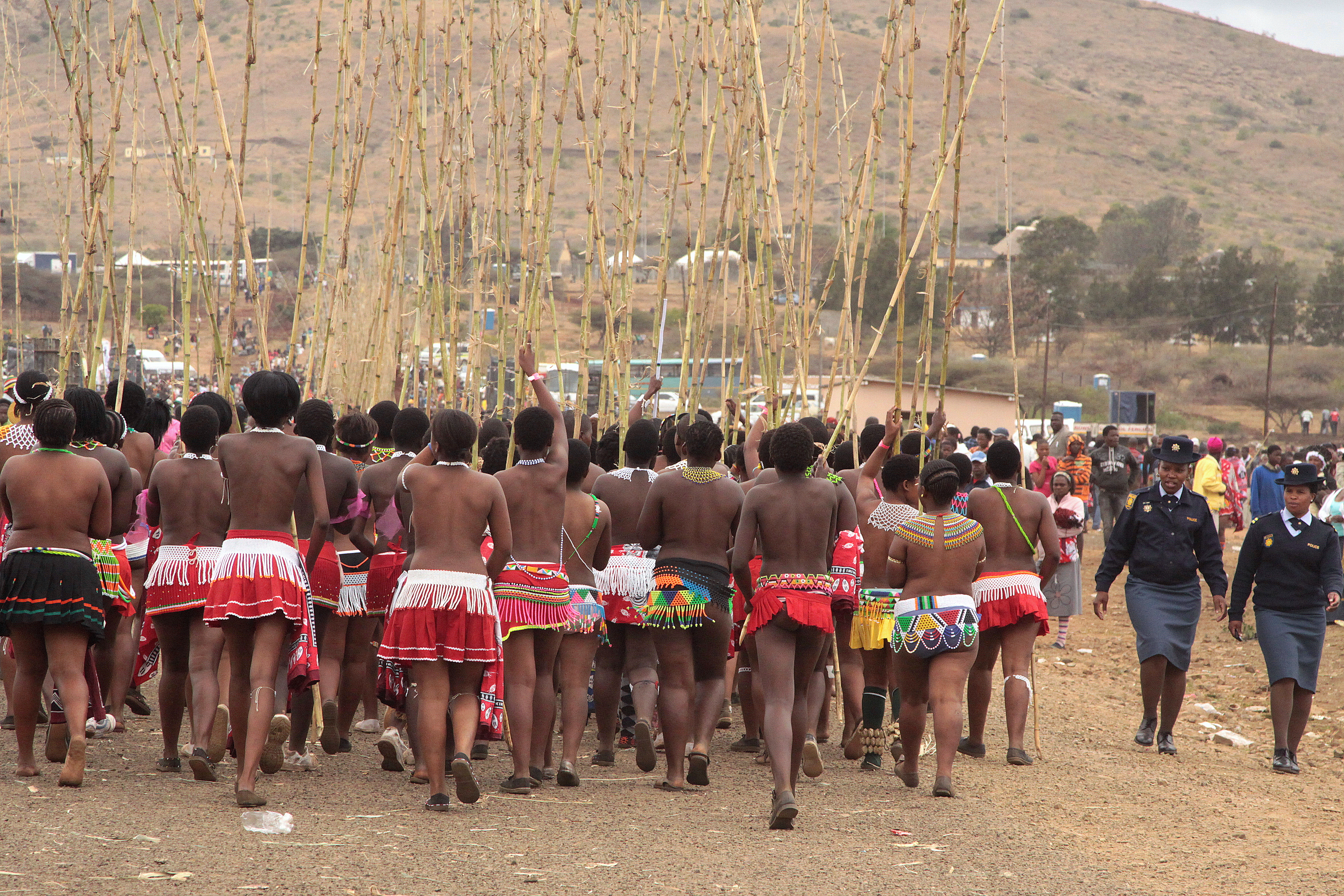
An Umkhosi woMhlanga ceremony in Nongoma, South Africa

In South Africa, the ceremony is known as Umkhosi woMhlanga, and takes place every September at the Enyokeni Royal Palace in Nongoma, a royal kraal of the Zulu king. The girls come from all parts of Zululand, though in recent years, there have been smaller groups appearing from Eswatini, Botswana and Pondoland.

All girls must undergo a virginity test, which in recent years has been met with strong opposition, before they can participate. Those who pass are made to go bare-breasted and wear traditional skirts that show their bottoms, accompanied by beadwork accessories and colourful sashes, as a show of pride in their bodily autonomy. Each sash has appendages of different colours, denoting whether or not the girl is betrothed.

The ceremony proper sees the girls carry a long reed, which would then be deposited as they dance before the king. They take care to choose only the longest and strongest reeds, carrying them above their heads in a slow procession up the hill to Enyokeni Palace. The procession is led by the chief Zulu princess, who takes a prominent role throughout the festival. A broken reed along the way indicates that the girl has had sexual intercourse.

The ceremony was reintroduced by King Goodwill Zwelithini in 1991 as a means to encourage young Zulu girls to delay sexual activity until marriage, and thus limit the possibility of HIV transmission. In 2007, about 30,000 girls took part in the event. Ceremony organisers have occasionally enforced strict rules on photographers, as some of them have been accused of publishing pictures of the rites on pornographic websites.

In past years, the event was attended by former President of South Africa Jacob Zuma, himself a Zulu, and former Premier of KwaZulu-Natal Zweli Mkhize.

== Nudity controversy ==
The reed dance videos were once classified as age-restricted content by YouTube, which angered the users who had uploaded them. This included Lazi Dlamini, the head of TV Yabantu, an online video production company that aims to produce content that "protects, preserves and restores African values". Working with more than 200 cultural groupings across the country and in neighbouring Eswatini, Dlamini organised a series of protests against YouTube's owner Google to force them to rethink their position. YouTube later lifted the restriction and apologised, with a spokesperson saying it was not Google's policy "to restrict nudity in such instances where it is culturally or traditionally appropriate".

== Preparations ==
The date of the ceremony is scheduled by looking at the phases of the moon. Once the moon reaches full stage, the ceremony commences. Places where the reed is located are visited to check if it is ready for cutting and its availability. Preparations also include finding places where the young girls will sleep, health meals, organising transport to carry them from their respective constituencies to the royal kraal. From constituency level, the constituency chooses four trustworthy males who will lead the young group of girls from that constituency. If an emergency situation arises two of the men who are accompanying this girls will head back home to report the situation. From early days the girls start practising traditional songs and traditional dances. At home, a girl will gather all the traditional attire needed for the ceremony.

== Modern changes ==
In earlier times, the girls used to sleep outside in open space; today they sleep in tents. Today they are also ferried by lorries instead of walking long distances carrying the reed. Microphones are used to start songs and to announce which song will be sung. The Internet, social media, radio stations and television channels are now used to announce when the ceremony will commence.
