= Dlamini =

Dlamini is an African clan and surname, common in South Africa and Eswatini. It is the most common surname in South Africa. Most people, whose surname is Dlamini, are also members of the Dlamini clan.

== Genealogy and history ==
The Dlamini clan traces its origins to a man known as Dlamini I, also called Matalatala, who is the source of all known Dlamini clan names. The clan is present across various ethnic groups within the Nguni branch of Bantu people in South Africa and Eswatini, with distinct branches:

- Xhosa branch
- Zulu branch
- Swazi branch
- Sotho branch (including the Baphuti)

Each branch maintains its own unique clan praises, varying among the Xhosa, Zulu and Swazi traditions.

=== Swazi Dlamini ===
In the early 19th century, under the rule of Sobhuza I, the Swazi branch of the Dlamini clan shifted its power center to the Ezulwini valley in central Eswatini. Due to tensions and armed conflict with the Ndwandwe in the south (present-day Shiselweni), Sobhuza relocated his royal capital to Zombodze. During this period, he conquered and incorporated many of the region's earlier inhabitants under his rule. Through strategic leadership, Sobhuza managed to avoid conflict with the powerful Zulu kingdom, which controlled the territory south of the Pongola River. The Dlamini dynasty grew increasingly powerful, eventually ruling over the entirety of present-day Eswatini. They established the House of Dlamini, which continues to serve as Eswatini's reigning royal family.

== Notable people ==
- Absalom Dlamini
- Amala Ratna Zandile Dlamini, also known as "Doja Cat"
- Ayanda Dlamini
- Barnabas Sibusiso Dlamini
- Barnes Dlamini
- Bathabile Dlamini
- Bheki Dlamini
- Bhekimpi Dlamini
- Prince Cedza Dlamini
- Dlamini King Brothers
- Dumisani Dlamini, Actor& Doja Cat's father
- Prince Guduza Dlamini
- Jacob Dlamini (author)
- Jacob Zambuhle Bhekuyise Dlamini
- Prince Jameson Mbilini Dlamini
- Lutfo Dlamini
- Prince Mabandla Dlamini
- Prince Makhosini Dlamini
- Malungisa Dlamini
- Mandla Dlamini
- Queen Mantfombi Dlamini-Zulu, consort of Goodwill Zwelithini kaBhekuzulu, the late Zulu king
- Maphevu Dlamini
- Martin Dlamini
- Maxwell Dlamini, president of the Swaziland National Union of Students
- Mbandzeni (also known as Dlamini IV)
- Prince Mfanasibili of Swaziland (formerly Mfanasibili Dlamini)
- Mfanzile Dlamini
- Moses Mathendele Dlamini
- Mphiwa Dlamini
- King Mswati III (born Prince Makhosetive Dlamini)
- Nathan Dlamini (born 2007), English footballer
- Ncengencenge Dlamini, princess and politician
- Nhlanhla Dlamini
- Nicholas Dlamini, professional bicycle racer
- Nkosazana Dlamini-Zuma
- Nkosing'phile Dlamini, Miss World contestant
- Noxolo Dlamini
- Obed Dlamini
- Phesheya Mbongeni Dlamini
- Phinda Dlamini
- Phindiwe Sangweni, born as HRH Princess Phindiwe Rita Dlamini
- Queen Sibongile Winifred Dlamini-Zulu, first consort of Goodwill Zwelithini kaBhekuzulu, the late Zulu king
- Sibusiso Dlamini
- Sihawu Dlamini
- Princess Sikhanyiso Dlamini
- Sindiswa Dlamini
- Siza Dlamini
- King Sobhuza I (Ngwane IV) Dlamini
- Sotsha Dlamini
- Prince Sozisa Dlamini
- Stanley Dlamini, commander of the Umbutfo Eswatini Defence Force
- Themba Dlamini
- Zanele Dlamini Mbeki, former First Lady of South Africa
- Prince Zinhle Mandela-Dlamini
- Zola, aka Bonginkosi Dlamini
