= Bongani Dlamini =

Swazi media executive (1956–2021)

- Born: Bongani Austin Dlamini; 22 June 1956; Nkhaba, Hhohho District, Eswatini
- Died: 20 August 2021 (aged 65)
- Other name: Sgcokosiyancinca
- Education: University of Swaziland
- Occupation: Swazi TV CEO
- Successor: Mlamuli Dlamini

Bongani Austin Dlamini (22 June 1956 – 20 August 2021), known as Sgcokosiyancinca, was a Swazi radio talk show host and television executive, best known for his role as co-host of a popular radio talk show called Khalamdumbadumbane and as Chief Executive Officer (CEO) of Swazi TV from 2011 until his retirement in January 2021.

== Background ==
Born in Nkhaba on 22 June 1956 to Prince Giyase Dlamini (the elder brother of Prince Bhekimpi Dlamini), Bongani Dlamini was a member of the Nkhaba Royal Kraal as a Prince of the House of Dlamini. He was affectionately known as 'Sgcokosiyancinca' or simply 'Sgcoko' and co-hosted the popular radio talk show Khalamdumbadumbane ("Problem-solving") with Jim Gama on the state-owned Swaziland Broadcasting and Information Service (SBIS) radio station. Dlamini was involved in a public feud with his cousin, Majahenkaba Dlamini, the Attorney-General of Eswatini, over the chieftaincy of the Nkhaba Royal Kraal.

Dlamini's career began with the Eswatini Television Authority (ETVA) in the 1970s. Before entering the media industry, he was the Principal Assistant Secretary for the Ministry of Agriculture. He briefly worked as a freelance journalist for the Times of Swaziland newspaper but left after two years to become an English teacher at Ekukhanyeni Primary School in Manzini and later at Sigangeni High School in Mbabane. In the 1980s, Dlamini returned to the media industry as a radio studio operator for SBIS, where he and Jim Gama launched the problem-solving radio show, Khalamdumbadumbane.

In 2010, Dlamini returned to the Ministry of Agriculture and Cooperative as its administrative head while Gama was ill. Following Gama's death and the cancellation of Khalamdumbadumbane, Dlamini was appointed CEO of Swazi TV in September 2011.

== Suspension ==
In 2016, Dlamini and the station's Chief Financial Officer Albert Masuku were suspended by the station’s Board of Directors owing to allegations of financial mismanagement that led to employees going for months without salaries and subsequent retrenchments. He was reinstated in July 2018.

== Death ==
He died of COVID-19 on 20 August 2021.
