= Khalamdumbadumbane =

Eswatini radio show programme

- Genre: Educational, cultural, language
- Running time: 30 minutes
- Country of origin: Eswatini
- Language: Siswati
- Hosted by: Jim ‘Mbhokane’ Gama, Bongani Sgcokosiyancinca Dlamini
- Original release: 1980s

Khalamdumbadumbane was a popular radio show in Eswatini (formerly Swaziland) with the state-owned Swaziland Broadcasting and Information Services (SBIS) radio station in Mbabane. Hosted by the legendary Swazi traditionalist, Jim ‘Mbhokane’ Gama and the royalist Bongani 'Sgcokosiyancinca' Dlamini, the show gained widespread recognition for its educational content and cultural insights and humour both in Eswatini and South Africa, particularly amongst Siswati speakers. It was canned in 2011 following the death of Gama.

The show was beloved for its straightforward approach to explaining the complexities of the Swazi culture, making it an essential part of Eswatini's radio history.

== History ==
It was started by Jim 'Mbhokane' Gama in the 1980s with Bongani 'Sgcokosiyancinca' Dlamini, a nephew of Prince Bhekimpi Dlamini, a prominent member of the Dlamini royal family who served as Eswatini prime minister and Chief of Nkhaba. Both Mbhokane and Sgcokosiyancinca were employed at the government-owned SBIS. Gama was employed as a technician for the radio station and Dlamini as a studio operator and they decided to start the Khalamdumbadumbane.

It was a hit from its inception, for its ability to present complex cultural concepts in simple terms and solve the problems using traditional advice rooted in the history of how the Swazi people handled problems. It went off air following the death of Mbhokane in March 2011. In October 2011, Sgcokosiyancinca was appointed as the CEO of Swazi TV. He died of COVID-19 in August 2021.

== Criticisms ==
Despite its educational value, Khalamdumbadumbane faced criticisms from women’s empowerment groups, particularly for its perceived sexist approach to certain societal issues in which women are presented as subjects of men and had no rights to choose not to be in polygamous marriages, especially in the face of risks of HIV infections. Some of the language and themes discussed on the show were seen as reinforcing traditional gender stereotypes. These controversies were noted on Gama, and the show occasionally sparked public debate about the role of traditional media in shaping societal views.
