= Dhlamini =

Dhlamini is a surname. Notable people with the surname include:

- Bonginkosi Dhlamini, South African politician
- Hamilton Dhlamini, South African actor, playwright and filmmaker
- Karabo Dhlamini, South African soccer player
- Mbali Dhlamini, South African artist

== See also ==
- Dlamini
