= Patrick Motsa =

- Born: August 23, 1942; Mbikwakhe, Manzini Region, Swaziland
- Military career
- Allegiance: Swaziland
- Branch: Army
- Rank: Brigadier General

Patrick Motsa is the deputy commander of the Umbutfo Swaziland Defence Force (USDF). He was appointed to this post in 2000; he was previously Director of Army Staff. He joined the USDF in 1973.
