= Mhlosheni =

Coordinates: 27°11′S 31°23′E

Mhlosheni is a town within south western Eswatini about 25 kilometres north-west of Hluthi and 75 kilometres west of Maloma.

Famous people born in the town include former Eswatini Deputy Prime Minister Obed Dlamini.
