= Moses Mathendele Dlamini =

Swazi politician (born 1947)

Dr. Moses Mathendele Dlamini (born 2 December 1947) is a Swazi political figure. He was a Senator and was acting chief of Mbelebeleni in the Shiselweni District. He was also Swaziland's Minister of Foreign Affairs and Trade from 2006 to 2008. Since October 2008 he has been serving in king Mswati III's advisory council or Swaziland national council standing committee(Liqoqo supreme council). Currently he is a member of the Ludzidzini Council 2022-2023

== Family ==
He is the son of Prince Gombolo Dlamini (nicknamed Mashayekhatsi) who served in the army during the second World War and is the grandson of Prince Velebantfu Dlamini who was governor at Mbelebeleni chiefdom in the Shiselweni region. His great-grandfather is prince Mtfonga who was son to prince Matintinti who was brother to King Mswati II and son to king Somhlolo. He is related to former sugar tycoon Dumisa Dlamini. His wife is Mrs. Maria buyile Dlamini, born on January 31, 1951. His children are Ngeti Dlamini (first born girl and the eldest child), Taka Dlamini (second born girl and second child), Zwakele Dlamini (first born son and third child), Dumezweni Dlamini (second born son and Twin brother to Dumile Dlamini), Dumile Dlamini (third born girl and Twin sister to Dumezweni Dlamini) and finally, Tivamile Dlamini (fourth girl and last born).

== Career ==
His careers have included being a high school teacher, high school head master; private secretary to the late former Prime Minister Prince Bhekimpi Dlamini, head of a security agency, worked at the Manzini city council and was part of the vusela team which spread the gospel of the tinkhundla system of governance.

He began to brush shoulders with Swazi politics sometime in the 1970s during a teachers' strike. All teachers were summoned by his Majesty king Sobhuza II at the royal kraal to express their concerns. On this day, one of the main speakers to speak on behalf of teachers was the late former deputy prime minister Albert Shabangu. Dlamini was not scheduled to speak on that day, but his colleagues requested that he should speak on behalf of them. He spoke with eloquent SiSwati and received widespread cheers from his colleagues for having defended their strike and clearly making the needs of the teachers known. From time to time, Dlamini would serve King Sobhuza II.

Whilst serving in the King's advisory council, he's also head of the southern African development community's brigade (SADC Brigade) which is a group of SADC peace-keeping troops tasked with the responsibility to engage in conflict areas to install peace. Below Dr. Dlamini in terms of rank are the Army Chief of Staff and Generals commanding the various battalions. Dlamini reports to his majesty King Mswati III as chairperson of the SADC TROIKA on politics, defence and security. He was appointed in this position in February 2009 by his majesty king Mswati III. Before then, Dlamini served as Swaziland's ambassador to the United Nations and the Republic of China on Taiwan. He was later appointed to the Senate where he was also elected Senate President.

Preceded by Mabili Dlamini	Foreign Minister of Swaziland; 2006–2008	Succeeded by Lutfo Dlamini
