= Jim Gama =

Swazi radio talk show host (c.1933-2011)

- Mbhokane

Governor of Ludzidzini Royal Village
- In office 2001–2011
- Succeeded by: Lusendvo Fakudze

Personal details
- Born: Jim Petros Gama c.1933 Malindza, Lubombo Region, Eswatini
- Died: 13 March 2011 (aged 77–78)
- Resting place: Malindza Cemetery
- Citizenship: Swazi
- Relatives: John Gama (great-great grandfather)
- Nickname: Mbhokane

Jim Petros Gama, known as Mbhokane (c.1933 - 13 March 2011), was a Swazi radio talk show host and the governor of Ludzidzini Royal Village, the home of the House of Dlamini, until the time of his death on 13 March 2011. As the governor of Ludzidzini, Gama chaired the royal Ludzidzini Council.

Gama rose to prominence in the early 1980s as the host of a radio talk show programme called Khalamdumbadumbane ("Problem-solving") for the state-owned Swaziland Broadcasting and Information Service (SBIS) radio station in Mbabane. Gama also hosted another popular radio show called Nasi-ke Siswati ("This is Siswati").

He first worked as a journalist for the Umbiki ("The Reporter"), the now defunct government-owned Siswati newspaper. He was then employed as a technician for SBIS before he introduced a popular problem solving talk show programme called Khalamdumbadumbane with co-host Bongani 'S’gcokosiyancinca' Dlamini.

== Death ==
He died on 13 March 2011 at a South African hospital in Pretoria at around 11.30am after a prolonged illness. He was sometimes referred to as the 'traditional prime minister' of the Kingdom of Eswatini and was viewed as the "enemy of the freedom and progress" for the people of Eswatini, in reference to his hardline stance against pro-democracy activists in the country. His illness started in October 2009 when he collapsed at his workplace, the Swaziland Broadcasting and Information Service (SBIS) radio station in Mbabane. He got paralysed and lost the use of his speech. He was buried at Malindza Cemetery on 19 March 2011
