= John Gama =

19th-century Swazi oral informant (born 1841/1842)

- Born: c. 1841-1842; Eswatini (Swaziland)
- Died: unknown Eswatini
- Occupation: Oral historical informant
- Known for: An authoritative elder interviewed and providing foundational information on Swazi royal genealogy and precolonial history
- Notable work: Oral testimony informing Swazi king lists recorded by Theophilus Shepstone Jr, James Stuart Archive, Allister Miller
- Relatives: Jim Gama (great-great grandson)

John Gama was a 19th-century Swazi oral informant explicitly cited as the source and compiler of the list of Eswatini Kings that was later published by Theophilus Shepstone Jr, James Stuart and Allister Miller in the documentation of the History of Eswatini.

Gama was consulted over a particular period of time when Shepstone was enquiring about the history and royal genealogies of Eswatini in the late 19th century.

In a letter dated 1898, Shepstone wrote to Stuart, stating that he believed Gama’s information to be accurate and added that in the consultation period Gama obtained information from other elders and long-term residents of Swaziland.

== Early life and background ==
John Gama was born in Swaziland around 1841-1842. At a young age, Gama left Swaziland with his father to Natal, reportedly for fear of violence. He was educated at Edendale in Natal, where he learned to read and write, which was an uncommon skill among 19-century Swazi elders. When he returned to Swaziland around the time of King Mbandzeni’s accession in the early 1870s, he enrolled with the Giba regiment. He was regarded as an elder with considerable knowledge.

Gama provided a Eswatini king list that was longer than those recorded earlier by Shepstone Jr. and Allister Miller.

Gama reviewed versions recorded by Shepstone and Miller and provided revisions and clarifications to the history.

Gama's work was later used by J.S.M. Matsebula in the A History of Swaziland editions in 1972.
