= Majahenkaba Dlamini =

Swazi jurist

- Appointed by: Mswati III

Personal details
- Born: Majahenkaba James Dlamini Nkhaba, Hhohho District, eSwatini
- Parent: Bhekimpi Dlamini
- Relatives: Bongani 'Sgcokosiyancinca' Dlamini (cousin)
- Occupation: Attorney-General of eSwatini; Judge of the Supreme Court
- Profession: Legal practitioner

Majahenkaba James Dlamini is a legal professional who served as the Attorney-General of Eswatini. He was the son of Prince Bhekimpi Dlamini.

His home is the Nkhaba Royal Kraal in Hhohho that was led by his father Bhekimpi as the Chief of Nkhaba.

A Judge of the Supreme Court of eSwatini, Dlamini has been on the Attorney-General post since the early 1980s - first appointed by Queen Regent Dzeliwe as the acting Attorney-General on 29 November 1982 and then by King Mswati III on 30 November 1986.
