= Swazi =

Swazi may refer to:

- Swazi people, a people of southeastern Africa
- Swazi language
- Eswatini (former name Swaziland), or a citizen thereof
