= Chief of Nkhaba =

Head of traditional council in Eswatini

- Incumbent; Prince Mnisi since October 2022
- Residence: Nkhaba
- Appointer: House of Dlamini

The Chief of Nkhaba is the traditional leader of the Nkhaba Royal Kraal in Eswatini's Nkhaba subregion of Hhohho District. The royal household is located near Piggs Peak in northwestern Eswatini and is one of the many royal outposts built across Eswatini by descendants of the House of Dlamini to safeguard land and the regime of the monarch. The current Chief of Nkhaba is Prince Mandla Napoleon Dlamini, who is officially known as Chief Mnisi.

== History ==
The Nkhaba royal household is an extension of the Enyakeni Royal Kraal in Manzini, which was established in the 1800s by Prince Malunge, one of King Ndvungunye's sons. During a period of mourning and internal power struggles following the death of his brother King Sobhuza I in 1836, Malunge supported the regency of Queen Lojiba Simelane and Prince Malambule until his nephew, Mswati II, ascended the throne in 1840.

Prince Malunge had three sons, Princes Jokovu, Soshangane, and Ngcaba. Prince Soshangane built the Nkhaba Royal Kraal and was appointed chief by his uncle, King Sobhuza I. After Soshangane's death, his son, Prince Mnisi, succeeded him as chief, serving until his own passing in 1961.

In 1975, King Sobhuza II appointed Prince Bhekimpi Dlamini, son of Chief Mnisi, as the Chief of Nkhaba. Before his formal installation, Prince Bhekimpi had already served for several years as headman of Nkhaba, continuing leadership both during and after his father's tenure. He was officially installed as chief in 1975.

== Disputes ==
Following the death of Chief of Nkhaba, Prince Bhekimpi Dlamini, in 1999, the royal village remained without a chief for over two decades due to internal disputes among Nkhaba royalists. The chieftaincy struggle continued until October 2022, when the factions finally agreed on Prince Mandla Napoleon Dlamini as the rightful successor. Two opposing factions vied for the title, one led by Bongani 'Sgcokosiyancinca' Dlamini, son of Prince Giyase (Chief Bhekimpi's elder brother) and another led by Majahenkaba Dlamini, son of the late Chief Bhekimpi. The dispute even escalated to the court as the two sides contested the rightful heir. Sgcokosiyancinca's faction claimed that a family council had unanimously agreed to designate Prince Mandla Napoleon Dlamini as Chief of Nkhaba, while Majahenkaba's faction advocated for Prince Mbuso Dlamini.

In 2011, Majahenkaba was accused of hiring armed men to forcibly evict Inkhosikati Molta Dlamini, the widow of Chief Bhekimpi, from the Nkhaba royal home. At the time, Molta had been serving as acting Chief of Nkhaba since Bhekimpi's death in November 1999.

The conflict was finally resolved in October 2022, when Prince Mandla Napoleon Dlamini was installed as Chief of Nkhaba by the Ludzidzini Royal Council during a ceremony attended by a large gathering.

== List of Chiefs of Nkhaba ==
- Chief Soshangane
- Chief Mnisi served until his death in 1961
- Chief Bhekimpi Dlamini was installed in 1975, serving until his death in 1999
- Prince Mandla Napoleon Dlamini, known as Chief Mnisi, is the current Chief of Nkhaba since October 2022
