= Umtsimba =

Traditional Swazi wedding ceremony

A traditional Swazi wedding ceremony is called untsimba (Swazi: [umtsʼimɓa]), where the bride commits herself to her new family for the rest of her life. The ceremony is a celebration that includes members of both the bride's - and the groom's - natal village. There are stages to the wedding that stretch over a few days. Each stage is significant, comprising symbolic gestures that have been passed on from generation to generation. The first stage is the preparation of the bridal party before leaving their village. The second stage is the actual journey of the bridal party from their village to the groom's village. The third stage is the first day of the wedding ceremony that spans three days, and starts on the day the bridal party arrives at the grooms' village. Thereafter the actual wedding ceremony takes place which is the fourth stage of the umtsimba. The fifth stage takes place the day after the wedding ceremony and is known as kuteka, which is the actual wedding. The final stage may take place the day after the wedding day, and is when the bride gives the groom's family gifts and is the first evening the bride spends with the groom. Although the traditional wedding ceremony has evolved in modern times, the details below are based on historic accounts of anthropologist Hilda Kuper and sociological research describing the tradition

== Before the bridal party leaves ==
The bride's father notifies friends and relatives that his daughter is to be married, and the chief of the village is informed that there will be a wedding. Thereafter, the father informs and invites the neighbours to the wedding. The father also appoints two men and two women to accompany the untsimba to the groom's homestead. Grass mats and grass brooms are made by the young bride, her relatives and friends, which the bride will take with her when she leaves her parental home. She also takes along hand-made presents for her in-laws, which signals to them a spirit of friendliness and generosity.

Almost all Swazi functions and ceremonies include traditional beer called umcombotsi, which is brewed together with other beverages by the elderly women of the village for the bride's journey to her groom's homestead. Should the groom live close by, the bride takes a pot of beer known as tshwala beliqaka to the groom's home, which indicates to them that she has come with her family's full consent.

Once a message has been sent to the future family that preparations have been made, the bridal party (umtsimba) is gathered together, mostly young girls and women that are relatives and friends of the bride. The size of an umtsimba is a matter of pride for a bride's family and may exceed fifty people. The important parties of the bride's maids are 1) ematshitshi (girls who have reached puberty but have not chosen a lover) 2) emaqhikiza (girls who have chosen a lover) 3) tingcugce (these are girls who have chosen a lover and are preparing for marriage). The umtsimba also serves to test the hospitality of the future husband.

== Day of departure ==
The day of departure is marked by intense activity, with young people wearing their finest traditional attire. Inkomo yekususa umtsimba (a cow to send forth the bridal parties) is killed and the meat cooked and eaten. The bride's father and elderly relatives ensure that the meat is correctly allocated among members of the group. The inyongo (gall bladder) is set aside for the bride by the lisokancanti (first born son) of her paternal grandfather. The Lisokancanti performs a ritual where he squeezes the gall on to the bride's mouth, forehead, down the centre of her face, down the right arm and the right leg. This is done to strengthen her and give her good luck. The bladder is then inflated and tied with a string above her forehead. This is her lusiba (feather), which is the sign that she leaves her parental home with her father's consent

The bride is then schooled by older women on the hardships of marriage. She is urged to practice restraint, never to answer insult with insult, and is strongly reminded that she represents the honourable name of her family. She is forewarned against accusations of jealous co-wives of witchcraft and laziness, and possible beatings from her husband. After the marital schooling, the father of the bride bids his daughter farewell and blesses her. The lisokancanti of the bride's grandfather, then issues instructions and advice to the appointed two men and women. He instructs them to ensure to return the insulamyembeti (tear wiper) cow, which will be mentioned later. The bride and tingcugce have a ludzibi (a girl that helps with carrying luggage) to carry clothes and blankets for the bride and the older girls. The young men also assist. The bridal party then start singing and dancing wedding songs and they depart. Two of the songs they sing are the following:

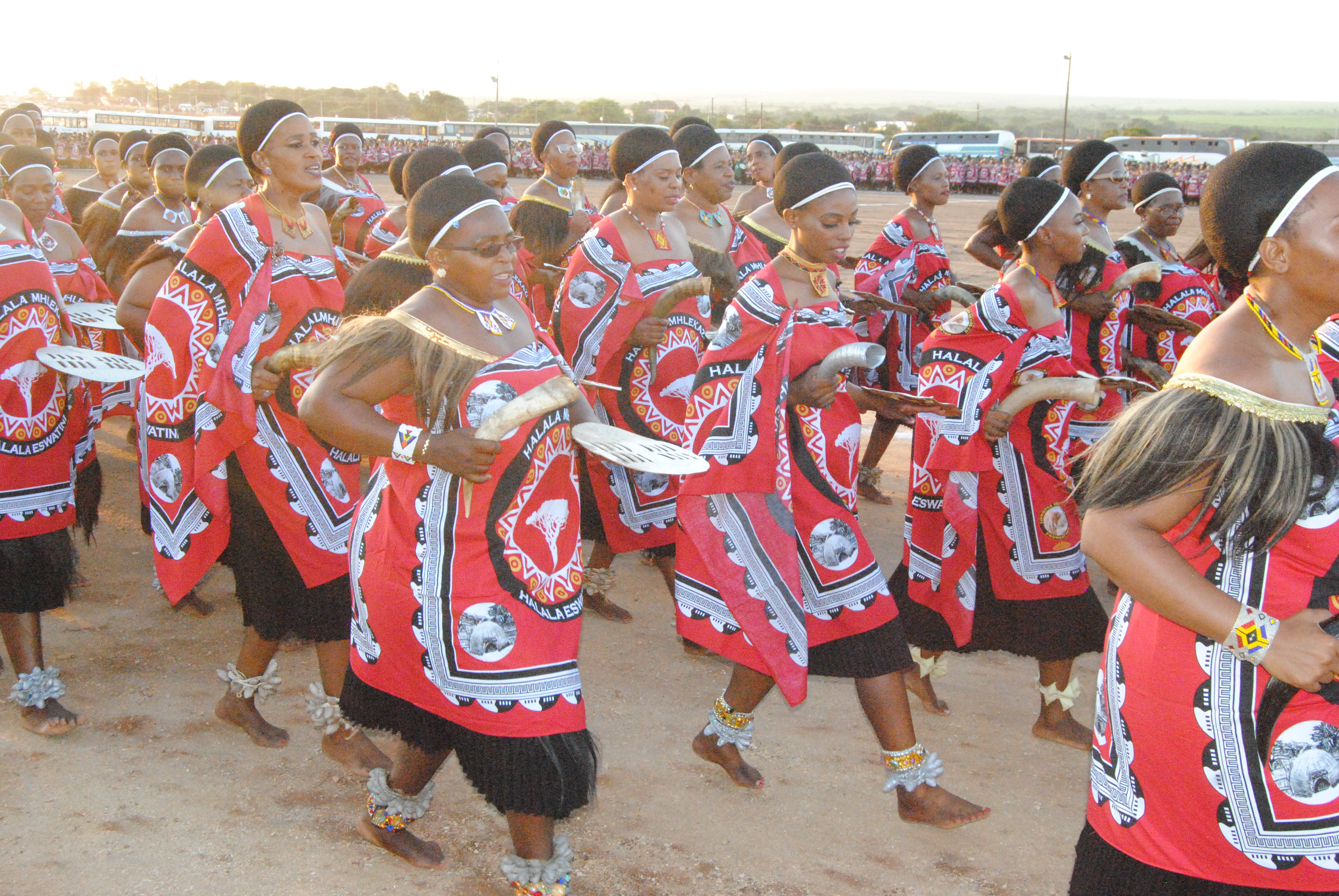
WOMEN DANCING AT BUGANU CEREMONY

Naye lodzabula bantfu timvalo,
Bambizile izwe lonkhe, Nangok' etile,
Siyamsunduzela

Udaba ludabula abantu izimvalo,
hyye mbize izwe lonke,
siya msunduzela

These songs explain that the bride is in great demand. As a special favour, she is being sent to the bridegroom. Depending on the distance between villages, the journey to the groom's homestead could take a number of days. Along the way, the bridal party is accommodated at the homes of specific kinsmen and friends. Today, the journey to the groom's homestead tends to be of much shorter duration, in part due to availability of modern transport.

== Arrival of bridal party (day 1) ==
The bridal party aims to arrive at the groom's homestead as the sun sets as it is believed that the ancestral spirits are at their most active and so welcome and bless the bride. When the bridal party approaches the groom's homestead, members of the bridal party dance in order to make their presence known. They wait outside the gates and await to be welcomed. The bridal party forms an arc, with the bride at its centre, the men start loudly praising her clan name and praising her ancestors. The singing ends when the groom's female relatives, wearing rattles on their ankles, emerge to welcome the party. As the bride starts singing the first song, a boy from the groom's village leads the bride and her tingcugce (single women) to her future mother-in-law. Kneeling, the bride places a string of white beads in front of her mother in law, and says: "I come to pay allegiance". The mother-in-law replies: "From whom do you come?" The bride answers "I was sent by my father". The bride and her party are then led away to rest while the groom's family continues to sing and dance as a sign of joyful welcome. The bride and her 'girls ' sleep in the same room. She has not seen the groom.

Before sunset, the bridal party goes to the river where they eat and drink. The groom's family arranges that a cow or goat known as the sahukulu. Each member of the umtsimba accepts a portion, however mature girls are not permitted to eat the offal. The bride herself is excluded from the sahukulu feast and only eats meals prepared for her from home or from relatives. The party then returns to the prepared rooms provided by the groom's family.

== The wedding ceremony (day 2) ==
The bridal party arrives early to prepare and get dressed, away from the homestead and wedding activities. Preparations are lengthy as the bride intends to impress all with her entry: she wears a cow leather skirt from home and a garment with fur called sigeja. Beads and wool cover her face, and her head is adorned with a crown (sidlodo) consisting of two bunches of large black feathers of a long-tailed widowbird. The community arrives, expecting to be entertained by the umtsimba's dancing. The women of the village carry long carving knives while the men hold spears and shields, as they know that the group will be dancing on that afternoon.

The umtsimba remains at the river. A young male emissary is sent to the bride from the groom's family to invite the party to join the groom. The bride, hidden by her 'brothers', dances alone towards her mother in law, flanked by her bridesmaids, and is later joined in dancing by the community. The audience give out little presents including coins, fruits and sweets to the dancing group. The ummiso (traditional dance) starts as the group approaches the traditional yard which has been prepared for the wedding. The groom wears a sidvwashi around his waist (printed skirt) topped with emajobo (loin skins made from cow or leopard skin) and beaded ornaments on his chest. Towards the end of the ceremony, he joins his bride in dancing. This is the climax of the dancing ceremony. Afterwards, the bridal party gives a cow (umganu) to the groom's family as a sign that the bride comes from a good family, and in a legal sense, it also portrays her independent status. The only people to eat the meat of the slaughtered beast are the members of the man's family, including the daughter-in-law. These people are referred to as 'bomakoti'. The gift of the umganu plays a central role in any future successionary claims.

At the end of this day, a cow is killed – a sidvudvu (porridge) or inkhomo yemtsimba (cow of the umtsimba) or indlakudla (eat food). This gives the bridal party the legal right to eat at the groom's homestead, and must be distinguished from the sahukulu which in theory is taken by force and eaten away from the homestead.

The killing of the sidvudvu is emblematic – during skinning, juices from the umsasane (stomach) should not be spilled as it could indicate that if it is spilt, it means that the groom has put the bride in the family way and would therefore have to pay a fine, in form of a cow. The umsasane is washed at the river by the men, and then sent to the mother of the bride (or if she lives far away, to an elderly woman of the bride's group) together with the left hind leg of the cow. The rest of the meat is divided between the two families, the bride's receiving the right-hand section and the man's the left.

== The wedding day (day 3) ==
=== The mekeza ===
The marriage day is known as lilanga lokuteka. The elders in the groom's family members are gathered before sunrise to summon the bride: "Come out, mother, and mekeza, now I marry you". Mekeza has no English equivalent, but it describes the mourning of the bride in leaving her family and her girlhood behind.

The bride stays symbolically silent and sad., as a man from the groom's side family calls her to mekeza, while her companions shout at him to go away. As the day progresses and the sun rises, the bride is accompanied by her girls to the groom's cattle-byre to mekeza, wearing simply her loin skirt from home

The bridesmaids walks slowly from east to west in the cattle-byre, while the bride leans on a spear from her husband's home, crying. The spear is symbolic, consisting of iron and wood, with iron symbolising death and the wood from the tree symbolising life. The bride wears a black leather skirt (sidvwaba), which signals her new position in society. Her girls follow behind her singing woeful songs. Mekeza songs are repeated continuously, and traditionally deal with the importance of family, the hardships of marriage and the significance of cattle to her family. The songs also serve to highlight the importance of respect, obedience and docility to the bride. Finally the bride gives the signal for her brothers, who have been in hiding, to 'rescue' her – a symbolic gesture. She sings:

Come and rescue me, my brother,
Arm and let us go.
The bird wanders.
Bring me back to my virgin room,
Back to my home.
Come and rescue me,
Rescue me, my brother.

The bride 'escapes' to her room with her bridal party, while the groom's family call to her: "We bring you back, mother, with your cow, a cow with a red stripe". This cow, always light in colour, is known as the insulamnyembeti - the wiper away of tears - and shows the bride's mother that the groom's people appreciate the care she lavished on her daughter. The mekeza can last from two to four hours and is very tiring for everyone.

=== Umhlambiso ===
After the bride's display of reluctance to leave her family, she now endeavours to find favour with her new family. The umhlambiso – the gifts for the future in-laws - is prepared and traditionally includes general domestic wares such as blankets, dishes, grass mats, clay pots, and brooms. Next, the bride extend her hand to her husband's, which contains red and white beads (libendlu), with white being the sign of virginity. Should the groom be absent, the bead is placed on his sister or other kinsman as a sign of acceptance. Today, this custom is not very common anymore. The bride gives gifts to the immediate family members and is increasingly incorporated into her husband's home.

The next gesture displays the bride's duty to bear children: she is led to the cattle-byre by an old woman, where the bridesmaids surround her singing mekeza songs. The old woman covers the bride with fat and her face with red ochre. A child from the groom's family is placed on her lap and is told: 'Here is your mother', and the child too is smeared with fat. Then the bride is given a skin apron, tied under her armpits, which is a sign of a new wife or a woman in her first pregnancy. The bridal party return home, and the bride stays in her new home.

Transfer of lobola occurs, which includes the transfer of cattle from the groom's family to the bride's family. This can occur months or years after umtsimba. The Swazi tradition states:"akulotjolwa intfombi kulotjolwa umfati" which means that, the bride price is paid for a woman who is legally bound in marriage and not for a single woman. However, nowadays lobola is mostly paid before the couple is married, when the woman is not as yet legally bound.
