= Glory Sedibe =

South African askari (1953–1994)

- Born: Glory Lefoshie Sedibe; 16 May 1953; Pilgrim's Rest, Mpumalanga, South Africa
- Died: 20 March 1994 (aged 40); The Reeds, Centurion
- Other names: Comrade September, Lucky Seme, Wally Williams, Dois M, Sabata
- Occupation: Freedom fighter turned enemy agent
- Movement: Umkhonto we Sizwe, African National Congress
- Spouse: Maria da Conceição
- Children: Two

Glory Lefoshie Sedibe, popularly known as Comrade September (16 May 1953 – 20 March 1994), was a member of the African National Congress (ANC) and a senior Umkhonto we Sizwe (MK) operative who in August 1986 was abducted by an Apartheid police death squad led by Eugene de Kock. After being severely tortured while detained in Piet Retief, Sedibe agreed to inform on his ANC comrades, becoming an askari or enemy agent and murdered his own comrades in Vlakplaas with De Kock and others for the Apartheid state. He was a very prominent ANC activist in exile who went by the noms de guerre Comrade September, Lucky Seme and Wally Williams and was also nicknamed Dois M and Sebata.

Sedibe's name featured high during the Truth and Reconciliation Commission that was established by Nelson Mandela's democratic government in 1996 and he was an example of how inhumane the Apartheid regime was to black people "who were often faced with no real choice at all [but] to betray their comrades or be killed," as journalist Rebecca Davis puts it. Sedibe's life is best documented in the biography Askari: A Story of Collaboration and Betrayal in the Anti-Apartheid Struggle.

== Early life ==
Sedibe was born in the historic gold mining town of Pilgrim's Rest, Mpumalanga in 1953. His father Ephraim Sedibe was a teacher who turned a mining company clerk in the asbestos mining village of Penge, near Burgersfort in Limpopo.

Sedibe was the third-born of Ephraim's nine children. He entered Penge Primary School in 1961 at the age of 8. Because Penge had only up to Standard 6 (Grade 8), Sedibe moved to Leolo Secondary School in neighbouring Burgersfort in 1969. In 1972, Sedibe obtained his Junior Certificate and after this he moved to Ngwana Bohube High School in Petersburg, where he obtained his Matric Certificate in 1973 at the age of 20. He could not go to university to pursue a degree because he didn't have money but instead opted to work for a construction company in Johannesburg in 1974 and then in 1975 left Johannesburg to Bushbuckridge, Mpumalanga where he became a teacher at Mathibela High School. In 1976, Sedibe left Bushbuckridge to Johannesburg's Kempton Park where again he worked for a construction company as a clerk at age 23. Later on that year he returned to Mpumalanga – this time to the Barberton area where he worked at a gold mine as a general labour.

== Political activism ==
Sedibe joined the ANC at the age of 24 in 1977. He left South Africa to Swaziland after his elder brother Kaborone, a president of the student representative council (SRC) at Turfloop University, was sentenced to five years in prison in 1976 for organising a pro-FRELIMO rally celebrating the collapse of Portuguese rule in Africa. Sedibe crossed the border to Swaziland as a refugee and had yet to turn 25 when the ANC sent him for specialised intelligence training in East Germany and the Soviet Union. Soon he rose through the ranks of the ANC's military wing Umkhonto we Sizwe to occupy positions of influence in exile, including becoming head of intelligence for the then Transvaal region.

== Arrest and abduction ==
On 13 August 1986, Sedibe and a fellow MK operative were driving around Manzini, Swaziland when the police arrested them on charges of being in Swaziland illegally. Soon after their arrest, the Swazi police transferred Sedibe to the Mankayane police station, on the south-western border with South Africa, after the Swazi cops had clinched a R150 000 deal with the Apartheid police for his capture. The plan was that Sedibe would be taken to the Mankayane holding cells where the Apartheid police would pounce and kidnap him, making it look like it was a jailbreak engineered by the ANC.

Indeed, a raiding team of eight men led by Eugene de Kock arrived at Mankayane police station and kidnapped Sedibe in front of bribed Swazi police on the rainy Wednesday night of 13 August 1986. The team consisted of Steve Bosch, Douw Willemse and an askari named Almond Nofomela, as well as Christo Deetlefs and Paul van Dyk of Ermelo security branch and ‘Freek’ Pienaar and Johannes Koole of Piet Retief security branch.

He was taken to a house in Piet Retief where he was subjected to prolonged torture and interrogation for five months before he agreed to co-operate with police and was then transferred to Vlakplaas where he became an askari, murdering his own ANC comrades. It did not stop there, however, Sedibe would allegedly go on to hunt down his ex-comrades himself, bring them to Vlakplaas and he was feared and hated by them.

== State witness ==
Sedibe became a star witness in the 1988 treason trial of anti-Apartheid activist Ebrahim Ebrahim, his co-accused Simon Dladla and Mandla Maseko in camera as "Mr X1'". In January 1989, Ebrahim was sentenced to 20 years for high treason, Dladla to 12 years for terrorism and Maseko to 23 years for high treason on Robben Island as a result of Sedibe's testimony. Ebrahim only served 6 years of this sentence and was released in 1991 when he won his appeal on grounds that the Apartheid police had illegally abducted him from Swaziland in December 1986 and had no jurisdiction to prosecute him

== Death ==
Sedibe died mysteriously on 20 March 1994. Eugene de Kock said Sedibe was killed with a poison allegedly poured into his alcohol. De Kock said the poison mimicked the symptoms of Hepatitis B, but journalist Jacques Pauw in his 1997 book titled Into the Heart of Darkness wrote that Sedibe died of heart attack as he was someone with a heart problem from his days in exile. A pathologist who examined Sedibe's corpse confirmed that his "weak heart" was a contributing factor to his death.

== Also ==
- Askari: A Story of Collaboration and Betrayal in the Anti-Apartheid Struggle

== Sources ==
- Dlamini, Jacob: Askari: A Story of Collaboration and Betrayal in the Anti-Apartheid Struggle. Jacana Media. 2014. ISBN 978-1-4314-0975-4.
