= Lobolo =

Form of traditional ceremony based in Southern Africa

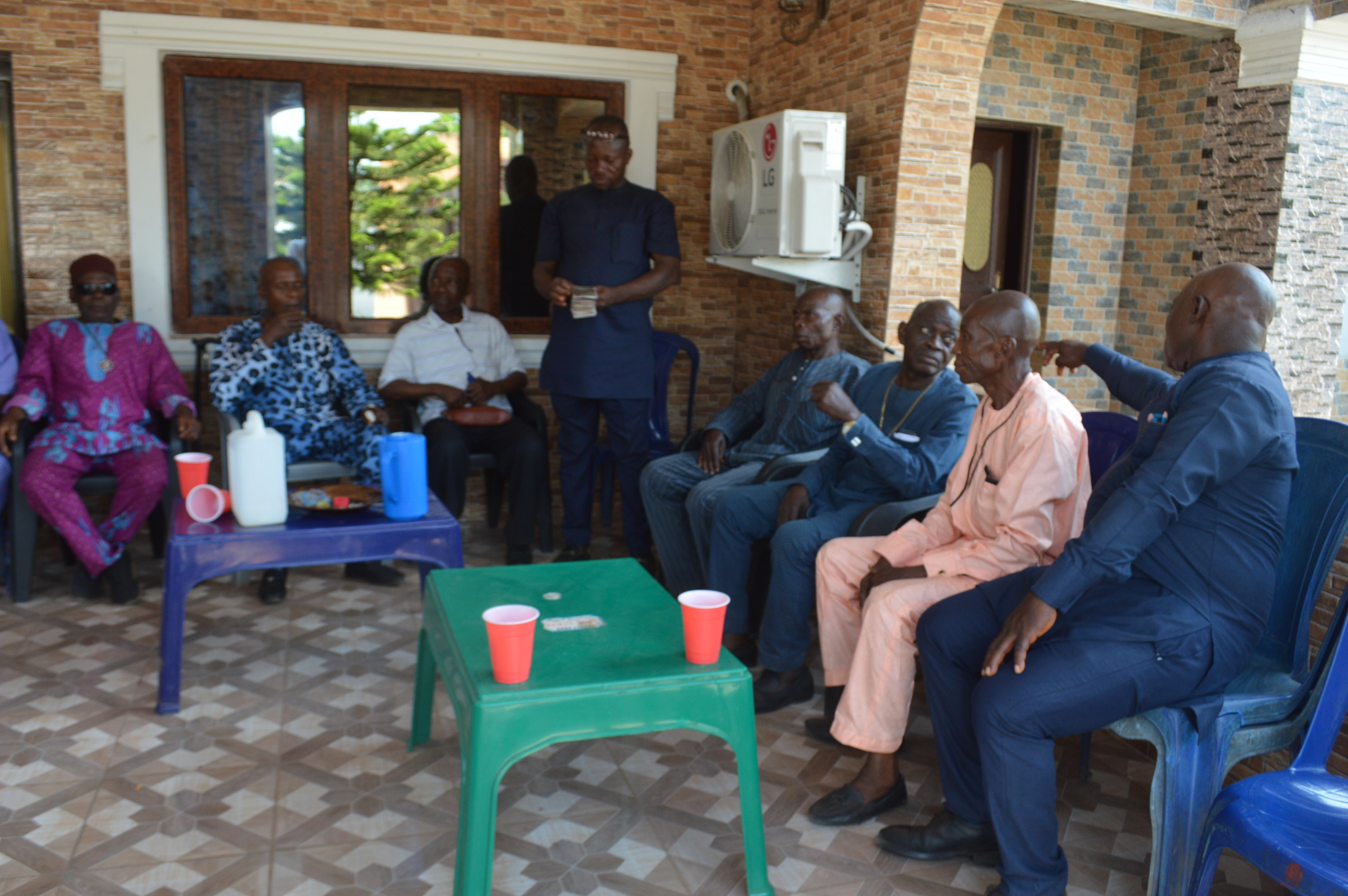
Paying of a bride price in Nigeria

Lobolo or lobola in Zulu, Xhosa, Swazi, Silozi, and northern and southern Ndebele (mahadi in Sesotho, mahari in Swahili, magadi in Sepedi, bogadi Setswana, lovola in Xitsonga, mamalo in Tshivenda, and roora in ChiShona), sometimes referred to as "bride wealth" or "bride price" is a property in livestock or kind, which a prospective husband, or head of his family, undertakes to give to the head of a prospective wife's family in gratitude of letting the husband marry their daughter and for the bride's family for raising her.

== Lobolo and the law ==
In South Africa, where the custom of lobolo is widely practiced, the union was previously concluded in terms of customary law, but is now governed under the Recognition of Customary Marriages, 1998 (Act 120 of 1998) (RCMA) and has the following prerequisites in order for a marriage to qualify under customary law:

- Consensus – Historically, the consensus was sought between the families of the prospective bride and groom. Since 2008, the RCMA states that consensus is required only between the individuals, and not their families.
- Age requirements – According to customary law, no specific age requirement exists; however, the RCMA includes a minimum age requirement of 18.
- Lobolo – A customary marriage, under the RCMA, is valid on the agreement to pay lobolo and does not require the payment of lobolo.
- Transfer of the bride – The transfer of a bride is another requirement for the validity of a customary marriage. The RCMA does not specifically regulate this custom and it is dealt with on an ad-hoc basis.
- Absence of common-law marriage – Two parties in a monogamous customary marriage can enter into a common law marriage, but not vice versa
- Prohibited degrees of relationship – In the past, each community had its own rules about prohibited relationships. These rules have evolved over the years. The RCMA states that these prohibited relationships are regulated by customary rules.

South African law recognizes customary marriages through the Recognition of Customary Marriages, 1998 (Act 120 of 1998). The purpose of the Act was to address gender inequality and the diminished rights of women in customary marriages. The Act was passed in order to improve the position of women by using measures that brought customary law in line with the provisions of the Constitution of the Republic of South Africa, as well as South Africa's international human rights commitments.

A key requirement for a customary marriage to be recognized as valid is that it must be negotiated, entered into, or celebrated in accordance with customary law. Furthermore, the prospective spouses must be at least 18 years old and both prospective spouses must consent to the marriage. Until the recent Johannesburg High Court judgement in Sengadi v Tsambo 3 November 2018, there has been contention and confusion as to what constitutes a valid customary marriage. In the case involving the widow of renowned hip hop musician, Jabulani Tsambo, also known as HHP, it was her status as the legally recognized customary wife that was in question. In this case the family of the deceased refused to acknowledge Lerato Sengadi as the customary wife on the basis that there had not been a customary 'handover ceremony' of the bride to the family of the groom, which would meet the requirements of a ‘'celebration'’ in accordance with customary law, and therefore no customary law marriage was concluded or came into existence between the deceased and Sengadi. On examination of the evidence, the judge concluded that in fact, there had been a tacit waiver of this custom because a ‘'symbolic'’ handing over of the applicant to the Tsambo family occurred after the conclusion of the customary law marriage. As the judge put it:

The respondent's insistence that the most crucial part of a customary law marriage is the handing over of the bride to the bridegrooms family, that if this did not occur no valid customary law marriage comes into existence despite the couple having complied with the requirements of section 3(1) of the Recognition Act cannot be sustainable because the respondent incorrectly assumes that customary law custom of the handing over since its original conceptualization has not changed, that customary is rigid, static, immutable and ossified. On the contrary African Customary Law, it's a living law because, its practices, customs, and usages have evolved over the centuries. The handing over custom as practiced in the pre-colonial era has also evolved and adapted to the changed socio-economic and cultural norms practiced in the modern era.

In what can be described as a landmark case, the judge ruled against the family and declared Sengadi as the lawful spouse of the deceased.

== Negotiations ==
In South African law, certain requirements must be complied with; in order to conclude a valid customary marriage (including the negotiation of the lobolo or mamalo). This negotiation is a crucial step towards a valid customary marriage, in law and in culture. A distinction is made between 'lobolo' or 'lobola', the tangible form of asset that constitutes an agreed-upon dowry, and the lobolo negotiations, the set of legal customary processes that constitutes the fundamental dialogues between the two families and is necessary to establish the lobolo and the conclusion of the negotiation. The latter always precedes the former.

The process of lobolo negotiations can be culturally varied, long, and complex, and involves many members from both the bride and the groom's extended families; normally, this would just be the uncles of the marrying parties, as well as the fathers, where custom allows. The groom is not allowed to participate directly in the actual negotiations. In some cultures, women may be present in the negotiations, while some households hold on to a tradition of not allowing women to actively take part in the negotiations.

The process typically starts with a letter from the groom's delegation delivered to the bride's family, requesting a date to meet and discuss.

Ivulamlomo is a key process to the negotiation as negotiations cannot begin until this traditional act has been observed. Often, to dispel any tensions between the families, in modern times a bottle of brandy is placed on the table; however, this is not required nor is the vulamlomo limited to brandy, and it can be traditional sorghum beer or cash. This is usually not drunk; it is simply a gesture to welcome the guest family and make everyone feel more relaxed, and it is known as ivulamlomo, which, literally translated, is isiXhosa for mouth opener (Sotho pulamolomo) i.e. price for opening your mouth (to speak) to express the purpose of your visit. It is up to the potential wife's delegation to decide whether to make use of the alcohol or keep it closed.

Lobolo cannot be paid in full in one go, the groom's delegation will need to come again after the first negotiations to finish paying for their bride-to-be. Once the lobolo has been paid in full then the next step follows which is called izibizo, which can happen on the day when lobolo negotiations are concluded. This step involves the groom's delegation giving the bride's family according to the list that was issued presents, which may include blankets, pinafores, doeks, shawls, and three-foot pots or grass mats for women and coats, walking sticks, hats, beer pots for men. There is then a celebration to mark the occasion.

== Amount ==
It is generally accepted that cows, at a minimum, are required in a lobolo within the Zulu and Xhosa cultures. While differing customs within various regions may contribute to determining the amount of the cash value of each cow, it also depends on the negotiation prowess of the representatives or oonozakuzaku. In modern times, there has been growing controversy around the amount demanded in certain families deemed by spectators as unreasonably excessive. Today, negotiations involve setting a price for a single cow and then multiplying the agreed price by the number of cows the new bride is deemed to be worth. The amount due is affected by many different factors including, but not limited to, the education level of the prospective bride, the financial means of the prospective spouses, and whether the prospective bride (or groom) already has children. Semanya (2014) claims that even high-profile figures such as Nelson Mandela practiced the custom, by paying a lobolo of 60 cows for his wife, Graça Machel.

== Northern Ndebele culture ==
A man marrying a woman from the Ndebele culture has to observe lobola. A man is seen to love his partner when he strives to save and pay for lobola. In the Ndebele culture in Zimbabwe, Lobola takes place in a number of stages. At each stage of the ceremony, there are traditions to observe and small amounts to pay. Lobola is not paid at once but is a culmination of many different amounts. The amount paid is determined during negotiations and is dependent on various factors. If the groom has been saving up in preparation for the marriage, after hints from his beloved of what the lobola might be, the process can be concluded in two short stages - the first stage, the mouth opener stage or "isivulamlomo", where the groom is given a chance to state his intentions to marry his beloved after putting money in a woven basket, and the bride's family tells the grooms family what they want as lobolo. A date is then set, agreeable to both parties, to meet again. At the time of writing, a cow in Zimbabwe in equivalent rate is given to the bride's family, the family can ask for a cash equivalent of the number of cows they want. This is convenient to most families because keeping cattle can be time and labour-intensive. This cow is called "ukangaziwe" which is the bride's mother's cow. In the second stage, where the groom's family presents themselves on the agreed date, money is again placed in a woven basket to be allowed to speak and fulfills the bride's family requests by presenting all of the lobola.

== Negative effects ==
Lobolo may have some unintended negative effects. It may create a financial barrier for some young men looking to marry. It is common for a couple that is emotionally ready to commit to each other to stay unmarried if the man does not have the financial resources to satisfy the impeding traditional ritual, and in some cases, the bride-to-be who has the financial resources secretly pays her own lobolo by giving the money to the man who in turn hands it over to the bride's family. For those who do have the financial means, the issue can be lobolo's opportunity cost. Young men who are in the wealth-creation stage of life may feel that their future is better secured if they invest their money elsewhere to receive significant financial returns.

Lobolo is seen by some as an extravagance that has little relevance in a society where young Africans are trying to lift themselves out of poverty. However, the tradition is still adhered to as strongly as ever, and in families where tradition and intention override greed, lobolo is perceived to be an effective way of showing commitment between families, not just between the bride and groom. Lobolo is also seen by some rural South African women as a sign of respect in that it symbolizes their worth and reinforces their dignity. Many traditional marriages utilize a cash-based lobolo; this can be then followed by a European-style wedding ceremony, where the lobolo funds are used to pay for expenses. In this way, any outlaid costs are returned to the payer in another form, preserving tradition, honour, and finances.

Recently, the meaning of lobolo has been abused. The bride's family is demanding huge amounts of money from the groom's family and in turn, lobolo is now more of a money-generating scheme for most families. Instead of simple gifts for lobolo payment as it was in the 20th century and beyond, fathers are demanding outrageous amounts for their daughters. This has given some men in African society the 'right' to abuse and ill-treat their wives because they feel that they bought them. There is no gender equality because (in some views) the system "promotes male superiority" where the voices of women do not matter nor their importance acknowledged.

== Dissolution ==
The dissolution of a customary marriage occurs on the death of the husband or wife. However, the marriage could continue if the woman is transferred to a brother of the deceased to sire an heir. In the event that the woman returns to her father's house as a result of alleged abuse, the husband may have to pay a fine to the father, prior to fetching (phutuma) her. If the husband does not fetch her within a reasonable time, then it would be assumed that he had intended to dissolve the marriage. If the wife refuses to return to the husband, then the husband may make a claim to a portion of the lobolo. If the husband wishes to end the marriage, he could send her back to her father's house. Should the wife initiate the divorce, the father will have to repay some of the lobolo.

== See also ==
- Umtsimba – Swazi marriage ceremony
- Dowry – Another form of marriage related wealth transfer, usually from the bride’s family to the groom or his family.
