= Askari: A Story of Collaboration and Betrayal in the Anti-Apartheid Struggle =

South African biography, first published in 2014

- First edition cover
- Author: Jacob Dlamini
- Language: English
- Subject: South African liberation history
- Genre: History; Biography
- Publisher: Jacana Media (2014, South Africa); Hurst & Company (2015, United Kingdom); Oxford University Press (2015, United States)
- Publication date: 2014
- Publication place: South Africa
- Media type: Print (hardcover, paperback)
- Awards: Sunday Times Alan Paton Award (2015)
- ISBN: 9781431409754

Askari: A Story of Collaboration and Betrayal in the Anti-Apartheid Struggle is a nonfiction book by South African historian Jacob Dlamini. The book examines the life and actions of Glory Sedibe, also known as “Comrade September", a prominent member of the African National Congress (ANC) and its military wing, Umkhonto we Sizwe (MK) in exile in the 1980s, who became an askari - a term used in apartheid South Africa for former liberation movement members who collaborated with the state’s security forces.

== Plot ==
The book focuses on Glory Sedibe’s abduction in August 1986 from exile in Swaziland by an apartheid police unit known as the Security Branch. It also focus on his torture and interrogation and eventually his collaboration with the police.

Jacob Dlamini uses Sedibe’s life story to show the complexities in the struggle against apartheid and the systematic fermentation of betrayal and collaboration amongst comrades. According to Wendell Moore:

The book highlights just how far a coercive state can go to protect its system but, more importantly, what individuals will do in order to survive it.

Sedibe, undergoing extreme torture, provided police with key information that led to the deaths and arrests of former comrades and soon took up a paying job with the Security Branch as an askari or what the state called a "rehabilitated terrorist", stationed at Vlakplaas with Eugene de Kock and was feared by his former comrades.

== Reception ==
Askari was first published in South Africa by Jacana Media in 2014 and later internationally by Hurst & Company (UK) in 2015 and Oxford University Press in the United States. In June 2015, the book won the Sunday Times Alan Paton Award, one of South Africa’s premier literary honours for non-fiction writing.
