= Mbilini =

Mbilini is a masculine given name. Notable people with the given name include:

- Jameson Mbilini Dlamini (1921–2008), Prime Minister of Eswatini from 1993 to 1996
- Mbilini waMswati (1843–1879), Swazi prince
