= Jacob Dlamini (author) =

South African journalist, historian and author (born 1973)

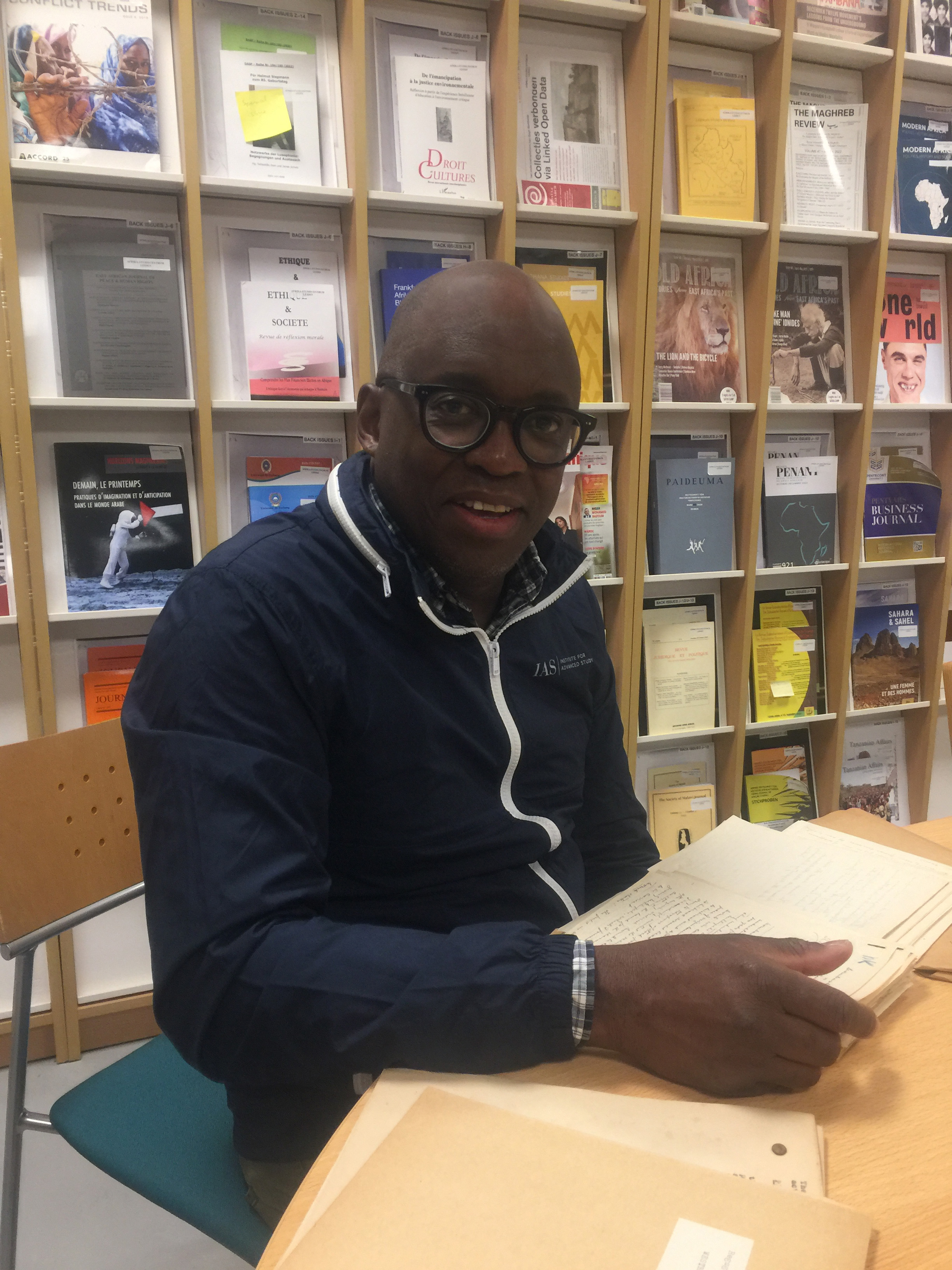
- Dlamini in Leiden (2023)
- Occupations: Journalist, historian, author

Academic background
- Education: Wits University; Yale University

Academic work
- Discipline: History
- Sub-discipline: African history
- Institutions: Princeton University

Jacob Dlamini (born 1973) is a South African journalist, historian and author. A professor of history at Princeton University, he specialises in African history. He has written five books about South African political and social history, each of which seeks to complicate popular narratives about Apartheid and black experience in South Africa.

== Biography ==
Dlamini grew up in Katlehong, a township outside of Johannesburg, during Apartheid. He studied English literature and political science at the University of the Witwatersrand (Wits), graduating in 2003 with a bachelor's degree and Honours degree, and has master's degrees from the University of Sussex and Yale University. At Yale, he had planned to research the Truth and Reconciliation Commission in the political science department, but switched to a course of study in the history department. In 2012 he received a doctorate in history from Yale. Before becoming a historian, he had been a journalist in South Africa – he was political editor and columnist at the Business Day newspaper, and also wrote for the now defunct The Weekender. Dlamini was a postdoctoral fellow at the University of Barcelona (2011–2015), a Ruth First fellow at Wits, and a visiting scholar at Harvard University (2014–2015). In 2015, he was appointed assistant professor at Princeton University. Since then, he has held fellowships at the Stellenbosch Institute for Advanced Study (2017) and at the Institute for Advanced Study in Princeton (2017–2018).

== Works ==
Dlamini has said that he aspires towards "understanding the centrality of race while also understanding that race doesn't explain everything" – that is, he aspires to resist race reductionism in explaining social and historical phenomena and in interpreting agents' motives and experiences. Closely related is his concern with the parts of the individual's private life and psychology that cannot be subjected to the total control of a state, racial system, or ideology. The "fantasy" of effective totalitarian state power, he says, has survived in South Africa as a holdover from the Apartheid era, though the impossibility of such a fantasy is probably precisely what accounts for the collapse of Apartheid. On these grounds and others, his books challenge entrenched – and politically sensitive – narratives in South African history, such as those about black collaboration, black experience under Apartheid, and the efficiency of the Apartheid state apparatus. André du Toit has called Dlamini South Africa's "first major post-apartheid historian," and Dilip M. Menon calls him "the enfant terrible of South African historiography."

=== Native Nostalgia (2009) ===
Dlamini's first book, Native Nostalgia, has been described as "polemical," including by Dlamini himself. It presents a nostalgic account of his own childhood under Apartheid, challenging the one-dimensional depiction of Apartheid-era townships as devoid of moral, cultural, and aesthetic activity. It argues that the nostalgia felt by many black South Africans for their lives under Apartheid (and for the Afrikaans language) can coexist with a moral and political denunciation of Apartheid, and challenges the notion that the Apartheid system was totalising and totally oppressive for those who lived under it. It also offers criticisms of post-Apartheid governance and society.

It won the 2010 University of Johannesburg Prize for Debut Creative Writing in English, and received mixed reviews. Eusebius McKaiser said it "delivers reflective insights with rhythmic beauty," and Hermann Giliomee lauds it for acknowledging the agency of black people living under Apartheid. Ross Truscott said it is "fascinating" but "small and perhaps hastily written." Some, however, said it is "reactionary" or "sickening." In response, other critics suggested that Dlamini's detractors had misinterpreted the book, taking him as an apologist for Apartheid. Indeed, Dlamini anticipates this:

The conundrum is this: What does it mean for a black South African to remember life under apartheid with fondness? What does it mean to say that black life under apartheid was not all doom and gloom and that there was a lot of which black South Africans could be, and indeed were, proud? Only lazy thinkers would take these questions to mean support for apartheid. They do not. Apartheid was without virtue.

=== Askari (2014) ===
Askari: A Story of Collaboration and Betrayal in the Anti-Apartheid Struggle (2014) investigates the life of Glory Sedibe, also known as Comrade September, a member of the African National Congress (ANC) and senior Umkhonto we Sizwe operative who in August 1986 was abducted by an Apartheid death squad, led by Eugene de Kock. Under torture, Sedibe informed on his ANC comrades, becoming an askari or spy, and ultimately an assassin, for the Apartheid state. The book explores the phenomenon of "collaboration" with systems of oppression, tracing its long history in South Africa and elsewhere, and examining the lives and motives of black people who were coerced or otherwise co-opted into complicity in Apartheid systems. In this way it seeks to disturb established historical and political memories of Apartheid, and to complicate the binary that distinguishes between victims and perpetrators.

Dlamini wrote the book as an Open Society Fellow in 2012 to 2013. He was attracted to Sedibe's story because of his own absolutist and even "intolerant" political beliefs as a youth in Apartheid South Africa. Active in the Congress of South African Students – and regarding non-Congress-aligned elements of the anti-Apartheid movement as his primary ideological opponents – he had been unable to imagine what could motivate a defection on Sedibe's scale.

Askari won an Alan Paton Award, a South African Literary Award, and a National Institute for the Humanities and Social Sciences Award. The Daily Maverick called it "deeply unsettling reading," and complimented it for "subverting the neat binaries of South African history." In André du Toit's view, the book is not wholly successful as a biography of Sedibe, but its critical analysis is rigorous and effective.

=== The Terrorist Album (2020) ===
The Terrorist Album: Apartheid's Insurgents, Collaborators, and the Security Police (2020) centres on a gallery of photographs of political enemies of the Apartheid state, known as the "terrorist album," which was maintained by and distributed among the Apartheid security police from the 1960s until the early 1990s. The book uses the album to investigate the workings of the security police by following the stories behind the album's entries – some of which were used to facilitate surveillance and brutal persecution by the Apartheid state, and some of which were absurdly erroneous. It also looks at the post-Apartheid lives led by the individuals on both sides of those stories.

The book grew out of research Dlamini had done for Askari. Given that former officers spoke of the terrorist album as a critical resource for the security police, Dlamini was surprised when he gained access to one of the few remaining copies of the album and found that much of it was inaccurate. The Terrorist Album suggests that a bumbling inefficiency and blind "racial panic" underlay the ostensible, and much mythologised, omnipotence and omniscience of the Apartheid state. Dlamini has said that this myth is the result of "mistaking the state's brutality for efficiency."

In one review, Alex Lichtenstein was exceedingly positive about Dlamini's oeuvre as a whole, but questioned whether The Terrorist Album "adds much to the portrait of apartheid one finds in Askari, although it does take readers deeper into the twisted minds of the security police."

=== Safari Nation (2020) ===
Safari Nation: A Social History of Kruger National Park (2020) discusses black people's tourism and leisure activities in the Kruger National Park, as well as broader African environmental history and the history of African environmental thought and migration. Dlamini intended the book to tell "the 'black history'" of the park, not in order to usurp the "dominant 'white history'" but to illuminate the complexity and significance of the park's history. Like his other books, Safari Nation is concerned with the dangers of "treat[ing] black South Africans as nothing more than victims of history." It is based on Dlamini's doctoral dissertation, which was titled, "Putting the Kruger National Park in its place: a social history of Africans, mobility and conservation in a modernizing South Africa, 1900–2010." Dlamini is also a qualified field guide.

Safari Nation won the University of Johannesburg Prize for Creative Writing in English and the American Historical Association's Martin A. Klein Prize in African History. It was also shortlisted for the Sunday Times CNA Literary Award for Non-fiction. It received favourable reviews.

== Bibliography ==
Books:

- Native Nostalgia. Jacana Media. 2009. ISBN 978-1-77009-755-1.
- Askari: A Story of Collaboration and Betrayal in the Anti-Apartheid Struggle. Jacana Media. 2014. ISBN 978-1-4314-0975-4.
- Safari Nation: A Social History of Kruger National Park. Ohio University Press. 2020. ISBN 978-0-8214-2408-7.
- The Terrorist Album: Apartheid's Insurgents, Collaborators, and the Security Police. Harvard University Press. 2020. ISBN 9780674916555.
- Dying for Freedom. Polity. 2024. ISBN 978-1509561087.

Selected articles:

- "The root of the matter: scenes from an ANC branch" (2009 Ruth First memorial lecture). African Studies 69(1), 2010, pp. 187–203. DOI:10.1080/00020181003647280.
- "We now know: reform, revolution and race in post-apartheid South Africa". Transformation 75, 2011, pp. 36–43. DOI:10.1353/trn.2011.0006.
- "Life choices and South African biography". Kronos 41(1), 2015, pp. 339–346.
- "Shame and the imaginary institution of society". Social Imaginaries 2(2), 2016, pp. 137–150. DOI:10.5840/si20162216.
- "Apartheid confessions". Interventions 18(6), 2016, pp. 772–785. DOI:10.1080/1369801X.2016.1222300.
- "Land and belonging: On the tomb ya ga Solomon Plaatje". In Sol Plaatje's Native Life in South Africa: Past and Present (ed. Janet Remmington, Brian Willan & Bhekizizwe Peterson), pp. 196–210. Wits University Press, 2016.
- "A hyphenated legacy? Obama's Africa policy". In The Presidency of Barack Obama: A First Historical Assessment (ed. Julian E. Zelizer), pp. 227. Princeton University Press, 2018.

== Awards ==
- 2010 University of Johannesburg Prize for Debut Creative Writing in English, for Native Nostalgia
- 2015 Alan Paton Award, for Askari
- 2016 South African Literary Award for Creative Non-fiction, for Askari
- 2016 National Institute for the Humanities and Social Sciences Award for Best Monograph, for Askari
- 2021 University of Johannesburg Prize for Creative Writing in English, for Safari Nation
- 2021 Martin A. Klein Prize in African History, for Safari Nation
