= Mabandla Dlamini =

Prime Minister of Swaziland from 1979 to 1983 (1930–2025)

Prime Minister of Eswatini
- In office 23 November 1979 – 25 March 1983
- Monarchs: Sobhuza II; Dzeliwe (regent)
- Preceded by: Maphevu Dlamini; Ben Nsibandze (acting)
- Succeeded by: Bhekimpi Dlamini

Personal details
- Born: Mabandla Ndawombili Fred Dlamini; 1 November 1930
- Died: 27 June 2025 (aged 94)
- Parents: Prince Mancibane Dlamini (father); Sihaha laMagwabaladlane Khumalo (mother)

Prince Mabandla Ndawombili Fred Dlamini (1 November 1930 – 27 June 2025) was a Swazi royal and politician who was Prime Minister of Swaziland from 23 November 1979 to 25 March 1983. He was born on 1 November 1930, and died in South Africa on 27 June 2025, at the age of 94.

== Family background ==
Prince Mabandla's grandfather was Prince Magudvulela Dlamini (b.1850 - d.1922), a son of King Mswati II with Queen Mahambadle laSoshangane Nxumalo, a daughter of Gaza king Soshangane Nxumalo. Magudvulela's son was Prince Mancibane Dlamini, Prince Mabandla's father.

Political offices
| Preceded by Ben Nsibandze | Prime Minister of Swaziland; 1979–1983 | Succeeded by Bhekimpi Dlamini |
