= Ben Nsibandze =

Swazi politician (1931–2021)

Benjamin Mshamndane Nsibandze (17 June 1931 – 13 January 2021) was a Swazi politician and regional administrator. He served as Deputy Prime Minister, and then briefly as acting Prime Minister of Swaziland from 25 October 1979 to 23 November 1979.

== Biography ==
Nsibandze was born in June 1931. He worked abroad in his youth. He served as deputy prime minister. He served as a temporary premier in 1979 after the death of Maphevu Dlamini. After a month, he was succeeded by Mabandla Dlamini. He later served as the head of the national crisis management agency. Nsibandze had five children. He retired in 2014 and died in January 2021 at the age of 89.

Political offices
| Preceded by Maphevu Dlamini | Prime Minister of Swaziland; 1979 | Succeeded by Mabandla Dlamini |
