= Sotsha Dlamini =

5th Prime Minister of Swaziland
- In office 6 October 1986 – 12 July 1989
- Monarch: Mswati III
- Preceded by: Bhekimpi Dlamini
- Succeeded by: Obed Dlamini

Personal details
- Born: Sotsha Ernest Dlamini; 27 May 1940 Mankayane, Swaziland
- Died: 7 February 2017 (aged 76) Mankayane, Swaziland

Prince Sotsha Ernest Dlamini (27 May 1940 – 7 February 2017) was Prime Minister of Swaziland from 6 October 1986 to 12 July 1989. He was born in Mankayane. Dlamini died on 7 February 2017, aged 76.

== Biography ==
Sotsha Dlamini was born in Mankayane. He became prime minister after being appointed by Mswati III in 1986. He replaced Bhekimpi Dlamini, who resigned in 1986. Dlamini was prime minister as tensions of apartheid increased. Dlamini died on February 7, 2017, at the age of 76; he collapsed at his home in Mankayane, Swaziland.

Political offices
Preceded by Bhekimpi Dlamini	Prime Minister of Swaziland; 1986–1989	Succeeded by Obed Dlamini
