= Andreas Fakudze =

Andreas Fakudze (11 April 1945 - 29 November 2001) was the CEO at the King's Office and also served as acting Prime Minister of Swaziland (now Eswatini) from 25 October 1993 to 4 November 1993.

== Biography ==
In 1993, King Mswati III appointed Andreas Fakudze as an acting prime minister from the moment of Obed Dlamini's resignation after the parliamentary elections, and before the new cabinet of Jameson Mbilini Dlamini was sworn in. He maintained power over all 16 ministries.

Political offices
Preceded by Obed Dlamini	Prime Minister of Swaziland; 1993	Succeeded by Jameson Mbilini Dlamini
