= Stanley Dlamini =

Stanley S. Dlamini
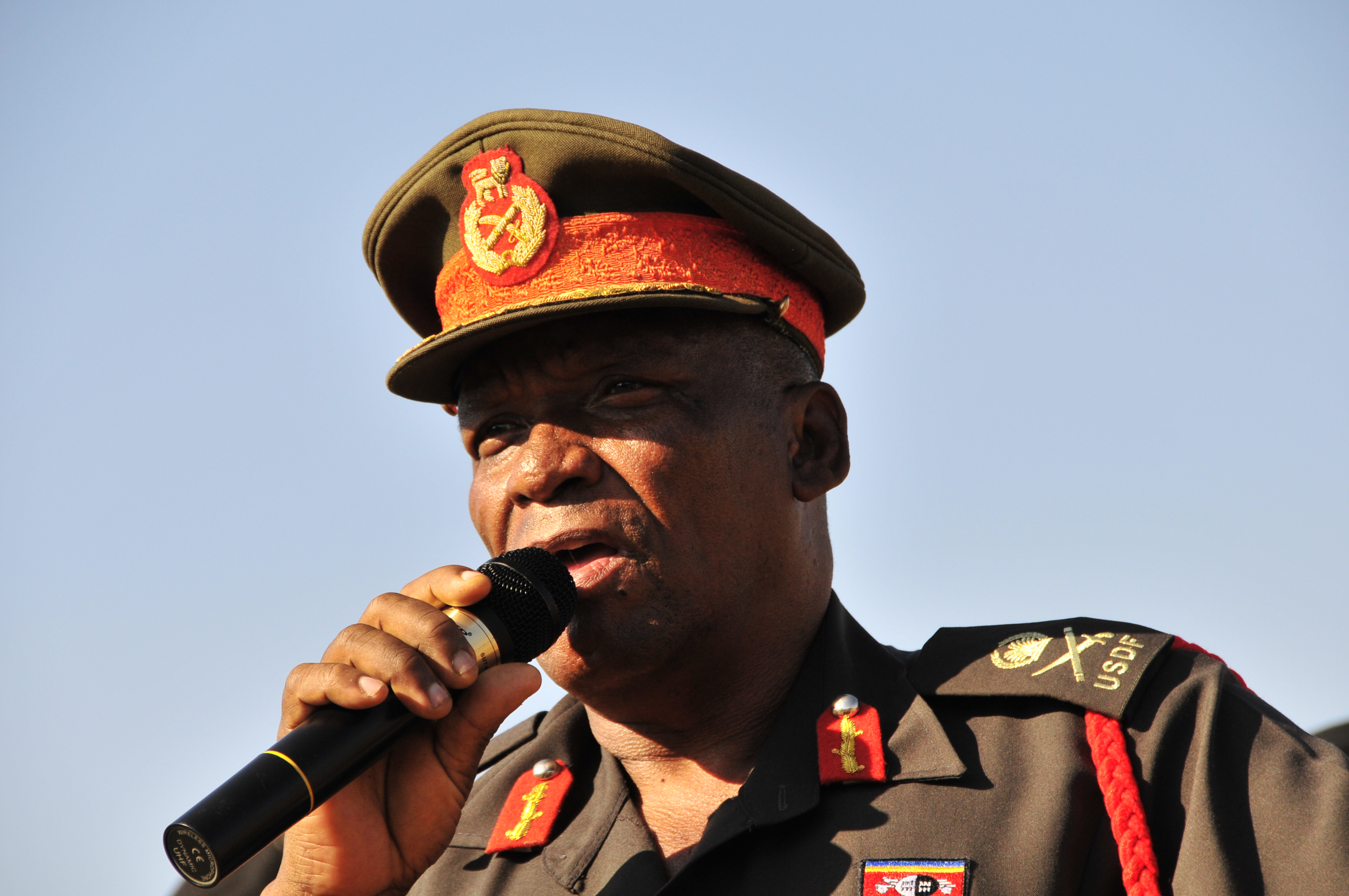
- Born: June 6, 1953; Nkhaba, Hhohho Region, Protectorate of Swaziland
- Military career
- Allegiance: Eswatini
- Branch: Army
- Service years: 1977–2019
- Rank: Major General

Major-General Stanley Sobantu Dlamini was the commander of the Umbutfo Eswatini Defence Force (USDF) from August 2000 until he was succeeded by Sipho Tshabalala in 2019. He originally joined the USDF in the spring of 1977.

According to government gazette number 81 of 2013 headlined the Umbutfo Swaziland Defence Force Order, 1977 order number 10 of 1977. The appointment of Army Commander of the Umbutfo Swaziland Defence Force Notice 2013.

“I, King Mswati III, Commander-in-Chief of the Umbutfo Swaziland Defence Force, appoint Lieutenant General Sobantu Stanley Dlamini to be army commander of the Umbutfo Swaziland Defence Force with effect from June 7, 2013 to June 6, 2016.

Thus done under my hand at Lozithehlezi this 11th Day of June, 2013 King Mswati 111 Commander-in-Chief Umbutfo Swaziland Defence Force,” reads the legal notice in part.

== Family ==
General Dlamini is currently married with three children.
