= Sihawu Dlamini =

Liswati footballer

Personal information
- Date of birth: 12 June 1985 (age 41)
- Place of birth: Swaziland
- Position: Central defender

Senior career*
Years	Team	Apps	(Gls)
2007–	Royal Leopards		

International career
2008–2011	Swaziland	18	(0)
- * Club domestic league appearances and goals

Sihawu Dlamini (born 12 June 1985) is a Liswati former footballer who played as a defender. He has won 11 caps for his country.
