= Hluthi =

Town

Coordinates: 27.21°S 31.57°E

Hluthi is a town in south-western Eswatini about 40 kilometres south-west of Maloma. It has a population of 7000 (2006).

D1 Oils has established a 1,000 hectare model farm at Hluthi with a nursery facility capable of growing 5.8 million Jatropha plants annually for Swaziland's fledgling biofuel industry.
