= Ncengencenge Dlamini =

Swazi politician and princess (born 1970)

Ncengencenge Dlamini (born 22 July 1970) is a Swazi politician and princess.

She was born on 22 July 1970 and is a daughter of King Sobhuza II (1899-1982), who had 210 children by his 70 wives. She is a younger sister of King Mswati III (born 1968), who succeeded his father in 1986 after a regency during his minority.

She was appointed to the Liqoqo, Eswatini's traditional council, in 2010 for five years, and again in 2018. She serves as a member of the Senate of Eswatini from 2023 to 2028, appointed by the king.

She is chair of the Senate's ICT Portfolio Committee, and in October 2025 spoke on the importance of increasing investment in ICT to support the country's development, at an international meeting held by government and educational bodies. In February 2026 she addressed the Logos Nation Church’s International Business Seminar in Harare, Zimbabwe.
