= Obed Dlamini =

6th Prime Minister of Swaziland
- In office 12 July 1989 – 25 October 1993
- Monarch: Mswati III
- Preceded by: Sotsha Dlamini
- Succeeded by: Andreas Fakudze (Acting)

Personal details
- Born: Obed Mfanyana Dlamini; 4 April 1937 Mhlosheni, Swaziland
- Died: 18 January 2017 (aged 79) Johannesburg, South Africa
- Party: Ngwane National Liberatory Congress

Prince Obed Mfanyana Dlamini (4 April 1937, in Mhlosheni – 18 January 2017 at Milpark Hospital) was Prime Minister of Swaziland from 12 July 1989 to 25 October 1993.

== Career ==
He was later a member of Liqoqo (king's advisory council), and was one of the two members in the council to have an affiliation to a political party.

He was a member of the Ngwane National Liberatory Congress. Dlamini was also a member of parliament where he represented the Nhlambeni constituency in the Manzini region.

Political offices
Preceded by Sotsha Dlamini	Prime Minister of Swaziland; 1989–1993	Succeeded by Andreas Fakudze
