= Attorney-General of Eswatini =

Principal legal adviser to the Eswatini government

- Coat of arms of Eswatini
- Incumbent; Sifiso Mashampu Khumalo since 2017
- Ministry of Justice and Constitutional Affairs
- Seat: Mbabane
- Appointer: King of Eswatini
- Term length: At His Majesty's pleasure
- Formation: Pre-independence (colonial era)
- Website: Government of Eswatini

The Attorney-General of Eswatini is the principal legal adviser to the government of Eswatini and the King of Eswatini. The Attorney-General (AG) is appointed by the King of Eswatini and is responsible for providing legal guidance on constitutional, legislative and administrative matters. The AG also oversees state litigation and legislative drafting. The office of the Attorney-General is established under Section 77 of the Constitution of Eswatini.

== Responsiblities ==
The office has its origins in the colonial legal administration of Swaziland (now Eswatini) and was carried into independence. One of the earliest known post-independence Attorneys-General was Majahenkaba Dlamini, who served from the early 1980s until 2017.

According to the official government portal, the Attorney-General’s responsibilities include:

- Providing legal advice to the Cabinet of Eswatini, ministries, and the monarchy.
- Drafting legislation and statutory instruments.
- Representing the state in civil and constitutional litigation.
- Vetting contracts involving the government.
- Overseeing legal reform and law revision.
- Participating in treaty and international legal negotiations.

== Appointment and Tenure ==
The Attorney-General is appointed by the King of Eswatini on the advice of the Minister for Justice and in consultation with the Judicial Service Commission. The tenure is held at the King's pleasure and is not subject to a fixed term.

== Incumbent ==
The current Attorney-General is Sifiso Mashampu Khumalo, appointed in 2017 to take over from the longest serving Majahenkaba Dlamini.

In 2025, Khumalo publicly objected to a reported secret agreement between the Eswatini and U.S. governments regarding deportations of Eswatini Nationals from the U.S. under Donald Trump's government, arguing that treaties must be legally vetted and tabled before such enforcement took place.

== See also ==
- Judiciary of Eswatini
- Politics of Eswatini
- Director of Public Prosecutions (Eswatini)
- Constitution of Eswatini
- Ministry of Justice and Constitutional Affairs (Eswatini)
