= Swaziland National Union of Students =

The Swaziland National Union of Students is a membership-based organisation of students in all higher institutions of learning in Swaziland. It seeks to create a student movement and geared to confront the socio economic and political challenges of the country. The organisation also advocates an education policy that is informed by the economic demands faced by the country and the democratisation of Swazi society.

One former president, Maxwell Dlamini, was arrested in 2011, the day before pro-democracy protests in the country, and was denied bail. He was arrested twice more between 2012-2014.

The Union's current president, Brian Sangweni, was elected in 25 February 2017.
