= Lutfo Dlamini =

Swazi politician

Lutfo Ephraim Dlamini (born 1960) is a politician from Eswatini.
