= Mankayane =

- Town
- Location within Eswatini
- Coordinates: 26°41′S 31°05′E
- Country: Eswatini
- Region: Manzini

Mankayane is a town located in the Manzini region of Eswatini. This small town services the chiefdom of Velezizweni. The town comprises a variety of resources readily available for use by the chiefdom, these include Mankayane Government Hospital, the home affairs offices, police station, correctional services, a fire station,

schools and large retail shops such as PEP stores and Shoprite U save.

Nearby are the extensive man-made forests which cover much of the high veld areas of Eswatini. The area around Mankayane is also covered in small homesteads where traditional forms of agriculture are carried out. Other small irrigation schemes now exist providing a cash cropping basis for some local farmers. Such schemes are Ntamakuphila and Vulamehlo.

The areas to the West and South of Mankayane are Swazi Nation Land (SNL). These areas are "tribal" lands. That is they are administered under traditional systems of land tenure where a chief gives land to men, enough for their wives and children to use. This happens at the point at which these men "give Khonta", or allegiance, to the Chief. Individuals do not own the land they have "rights of usufruct", rights to use land as they need it for their families. To the north are the man-made forests and these sit in Individually Tenured Land (ITL). These pieces of land comprising almost 50% of the country are those areas taken over for use as farms and industry at the time of colonisation. These areas are privately owned; originally by English or Afrikaans farmers and increasingly by indigenous or naturalised Swazi.

== Sports ==
Construction of the Mankayane Stadium began in May 2026. The stadium was estimated to cost E4 billion, and have capacity for 30,000 seated spectators.The construction
