= Maphevu Dlamini =

Swazi Prime Minister

Prince Maphevu Harry Dlamini (31 March 1922 – 25 October 1979) was Prime Minister of Swaziland from 17 March 1976 until his death on 25 October 1979.

== Biography ==
Dlamini was a member of the House of Dlamini, the Swazi royal family, and also served as commander of the Royal Swaziland Defence Force from 1973, where he rose to the rank of major general.

After his appointment, he supported the policy of King Sobhuza II, who abolished the parliamentary regime on March 25, 1977. Dlamini died in power.

Political offices
Preceded by Makhosini Dlamini	Prime Minister of Swaziland; 1976–1979	Succeeded by Ben Nsibandze
