= Umbutfo Eswatini Defence Force =

Armed forces of Eswatini

- Founded: June 1979
- Service branches: Army; Air Force

Leadership
- Commander-in-chief: King Mswati III
- Prime Minister: Russell Dlamini
- Defense Principal Secretary: Prince Sicalo Nkopolo Dlamini
- Commander: General Hulumende Mashikilisane Fakudze

Personnel
- Military age: 18―30 (Note: Compulsory HIV testing required, only HIV-negative applicants accepted)
- Conscription: No
- Active personnel: 3,000+
- Reserve personnel: 0
- Deployed personnel: 0

Expenditure
- Budget: $115 million (2011 est.)
- Percent of GDP: 3.0% of GDP (2011 est.)

Related articles
- Ranks: Military ranks of Eswatini

The Umbutfo Eswatini Defence Force (UEDF) is the military of the Southern African Kingdom of Eswatini. It is used primarily during domestic protests, with some border and customs duties; the force has never been involved in a foreign conflict. The army has struggled with high rates of HIV infection. Since measures were put in place the rate is dropping.

== History and structure ==
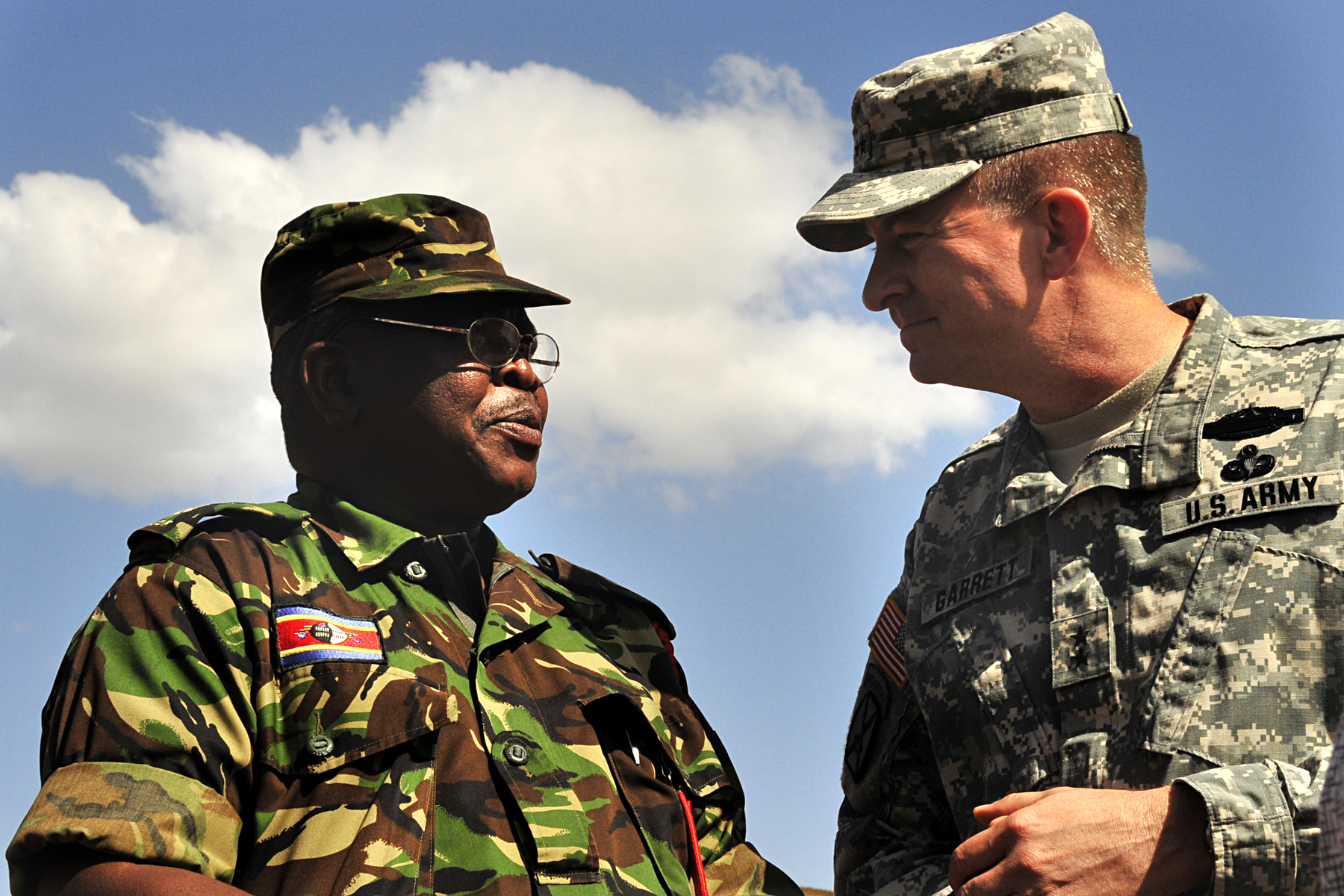
UEDF Lt. Col. Moses Swane speaks with U.S. Army Africa Commander Maj. Gen. William Garrett III during a 2009 medical training exercise

The UEDF replaced the Royal Swaziland Defence Force, which was created in 1973 to replace the role of the British Army following independence in 1968.

The King of Eswatini is the commander-in-chief of the Umbutfo Eswatini Defence Force, and the substantive minister of defence. However, he delegates the responsibilities of the day-to-day activities of the executive arm of the government.

There is a Defence Council, which is responsible for advising the King on all matters pertaining to the UEDF. The UEDF is commanded by Major General Hulumende M. Fakudze; the deputy commander is Brigadier General Khumalo, and the formation commander is General Hulumende M. Fakudze.

== Equipment ==
=== Armoured personnel carriers ===
| Vehicle | Country of origin | Type | Versions | In service | Notes |
|---|---|---|---|---|---|
| RG-31 Nyala | South Africa | Armoured vehicles | Mk5E | 7 | 7 delivered in the 1990s |

=== Weapons ===
| Weapon | Country of origin | Type | Versions | In service | Notes |
|---|---|---|---|---|---|
| Armalite AR-18 | United States | Assault rifle | AR-180 | Unknown | |
| INSAS | India | Assault rifle | Unknown | Yes | |
| IMI Galil | Israel | Assault rifle | Unknown | Yes | |
| SIG SG 540 | Switzerland | Assault rifle | Unknown | Unknown | |
| FN FAL | Belgium | Battle rifle | Unknown | Yes | |
| Sterling | United Kingdom | Submachine gun | Unknown | Unknown | |
| Uzi | Israel | Submachine gun | Unknown | Yes | |
| FN MAG | Belgium | General-purpose machine gun | Unknown | Unknown | |

== Ranks ==
Officers

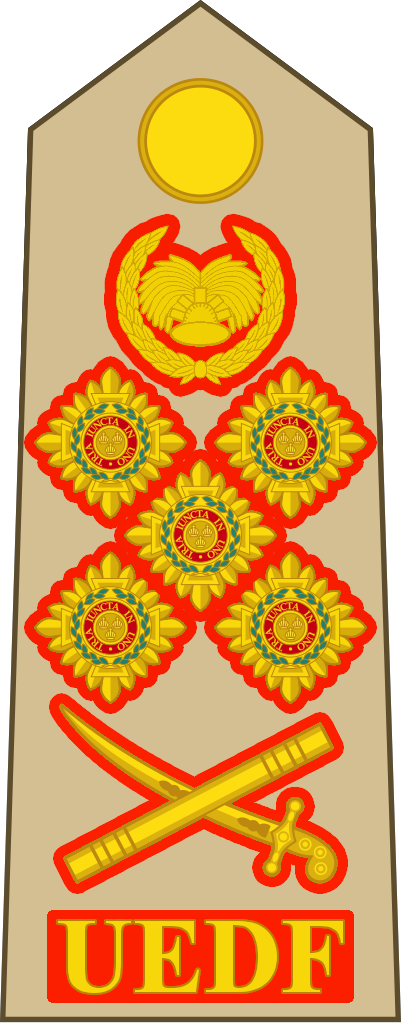
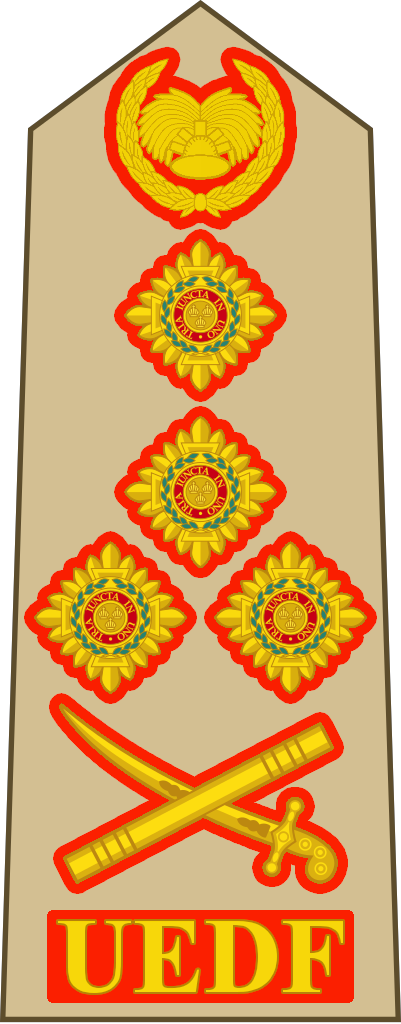
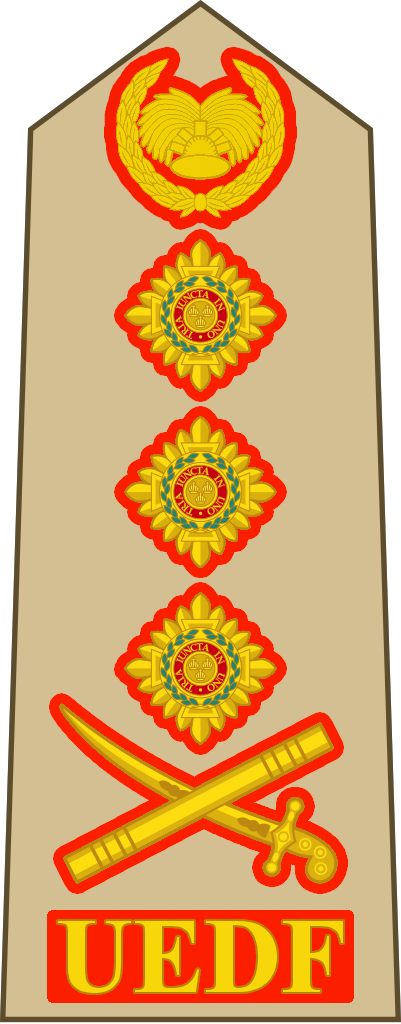
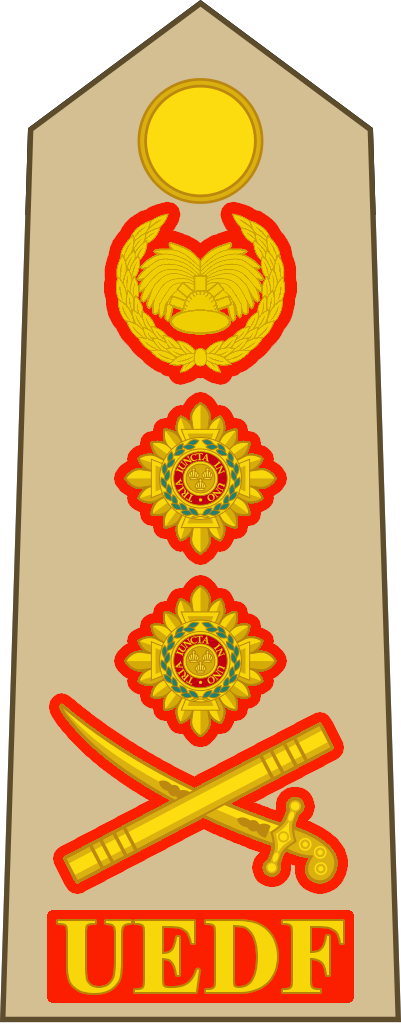
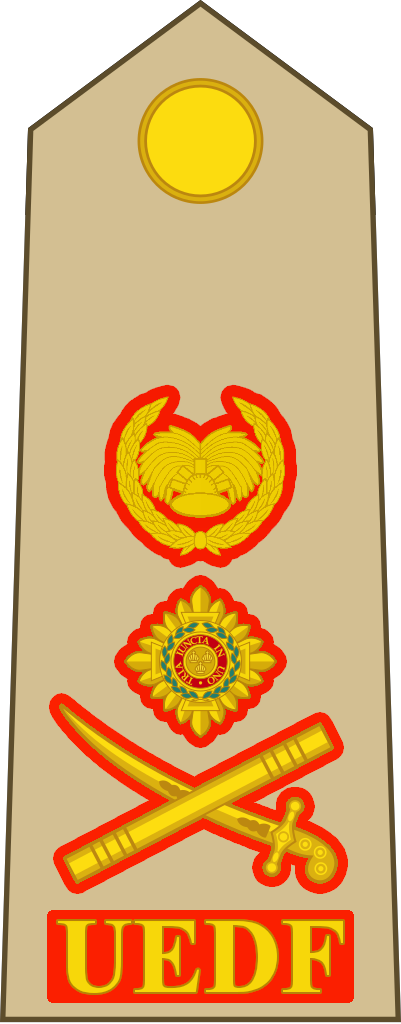
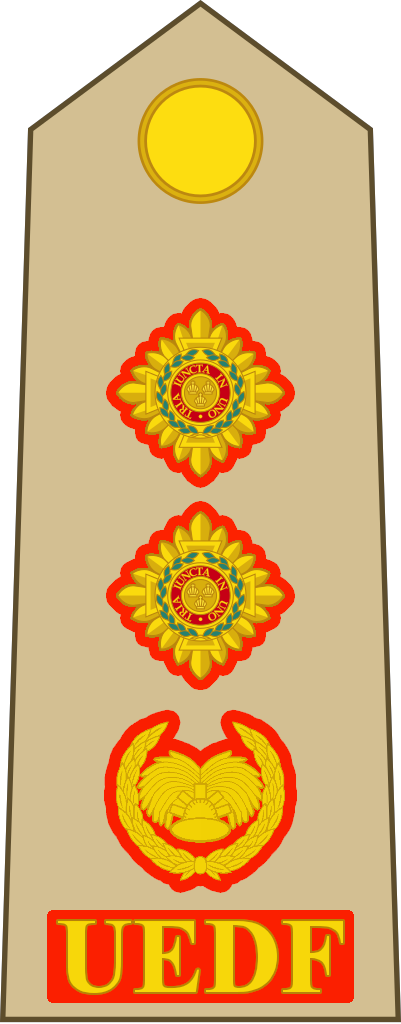
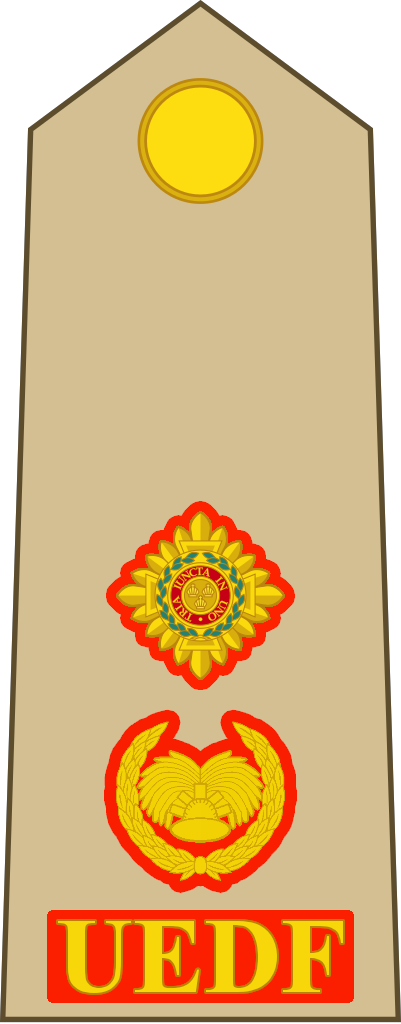
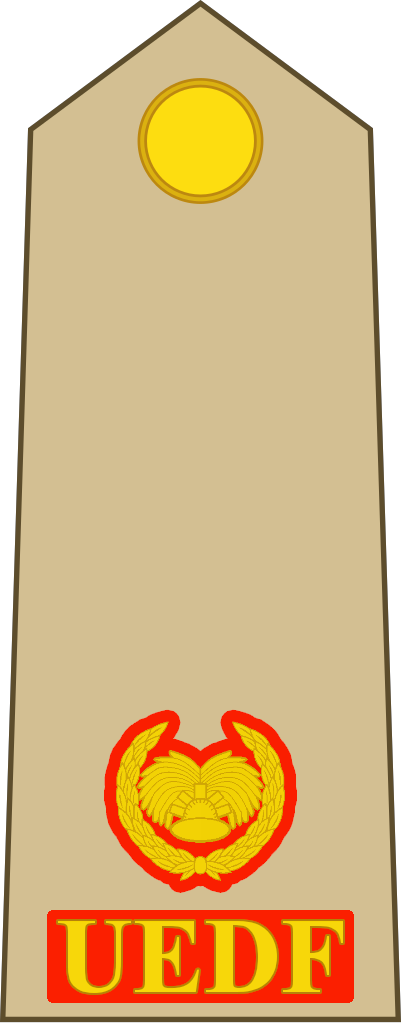
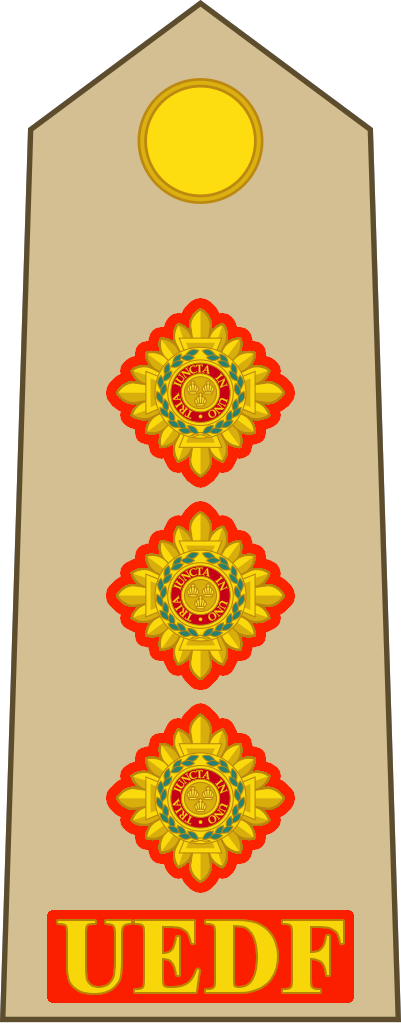
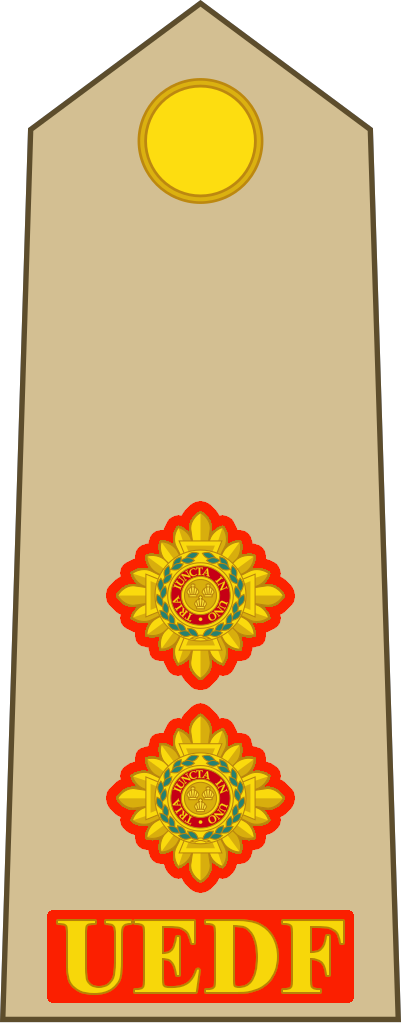
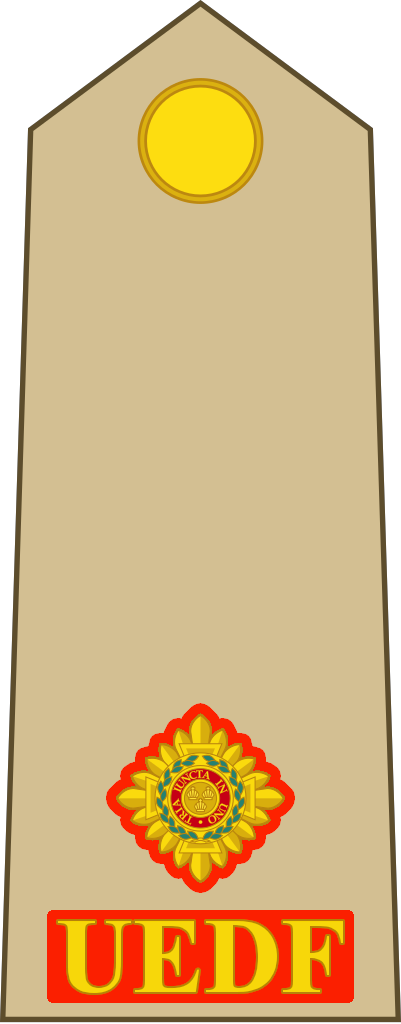
| Rank group | General / flag officers | | | | | Senior officers | | | Junior officers |
|---|---|---|---|---|---|---|---|---|---|---|---|
| Umbutfo Eswatini Defence Force |
| Umbutfo Eswatini Defence Force | Commander in Chief | General | Lieutenant general | Major general | Brigadier | Colonel | Lieutenant colonel | Major | Captain | Lieutenant | Second lieutenant |

Enlisted

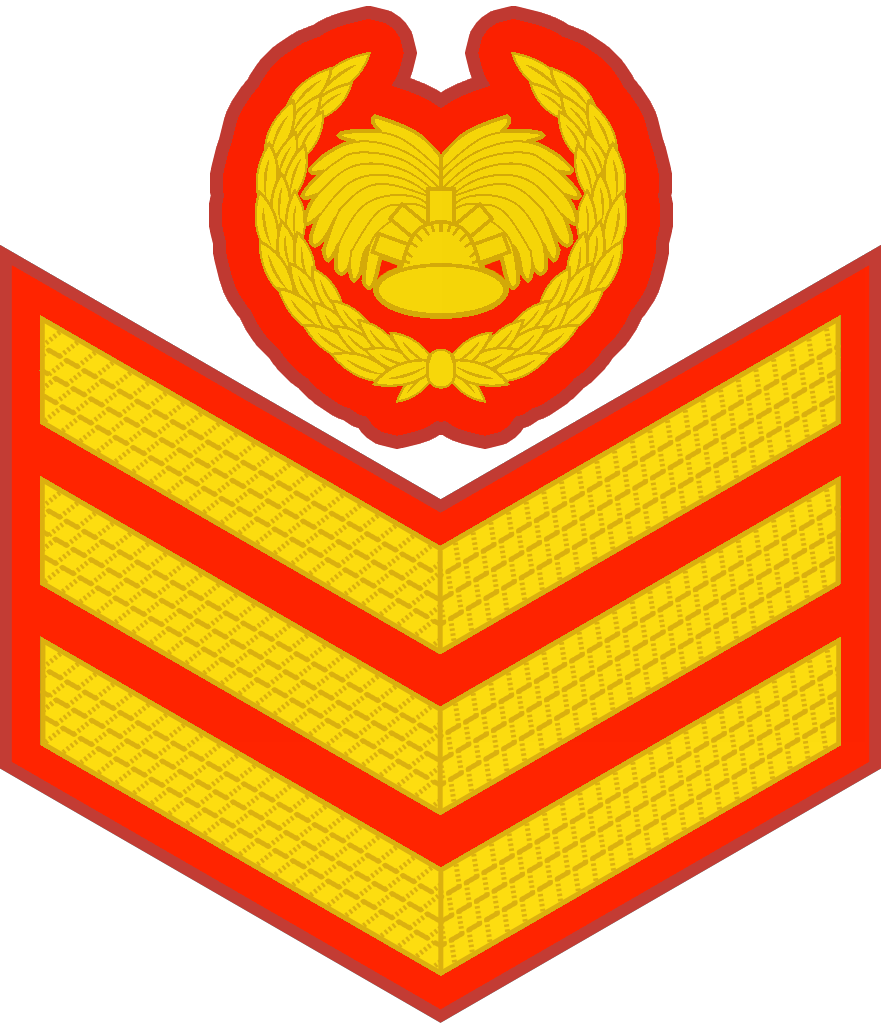
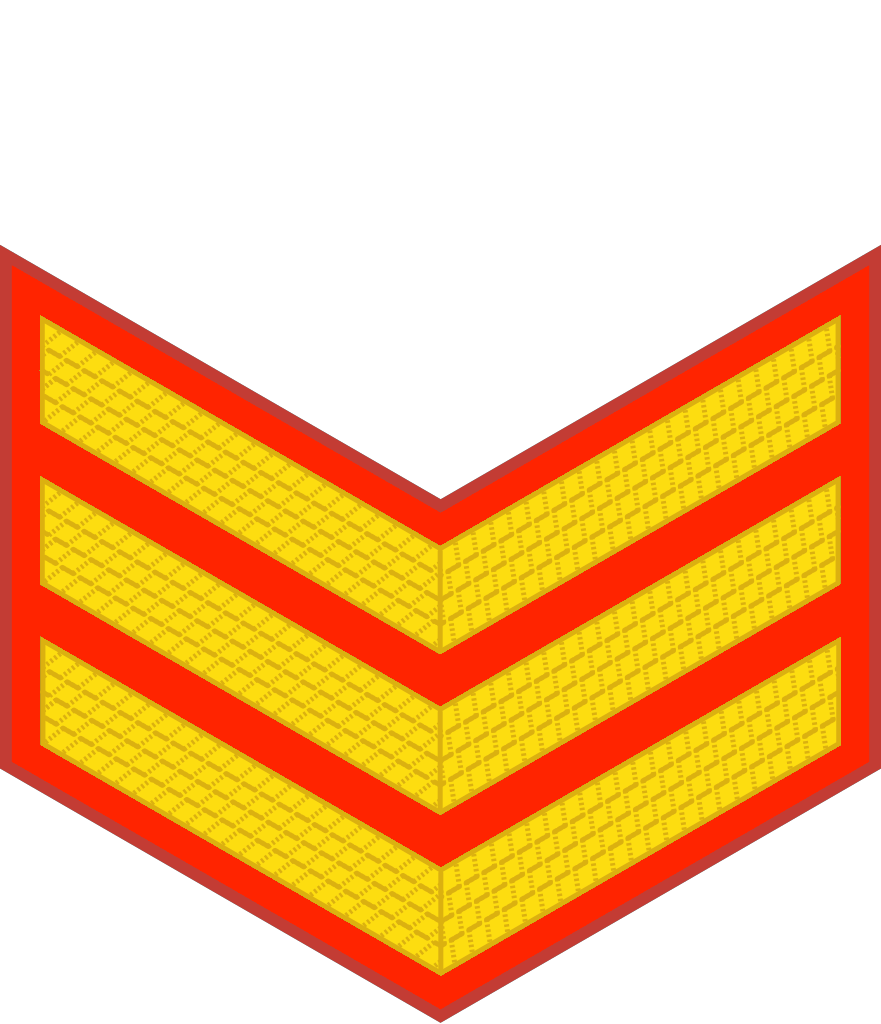
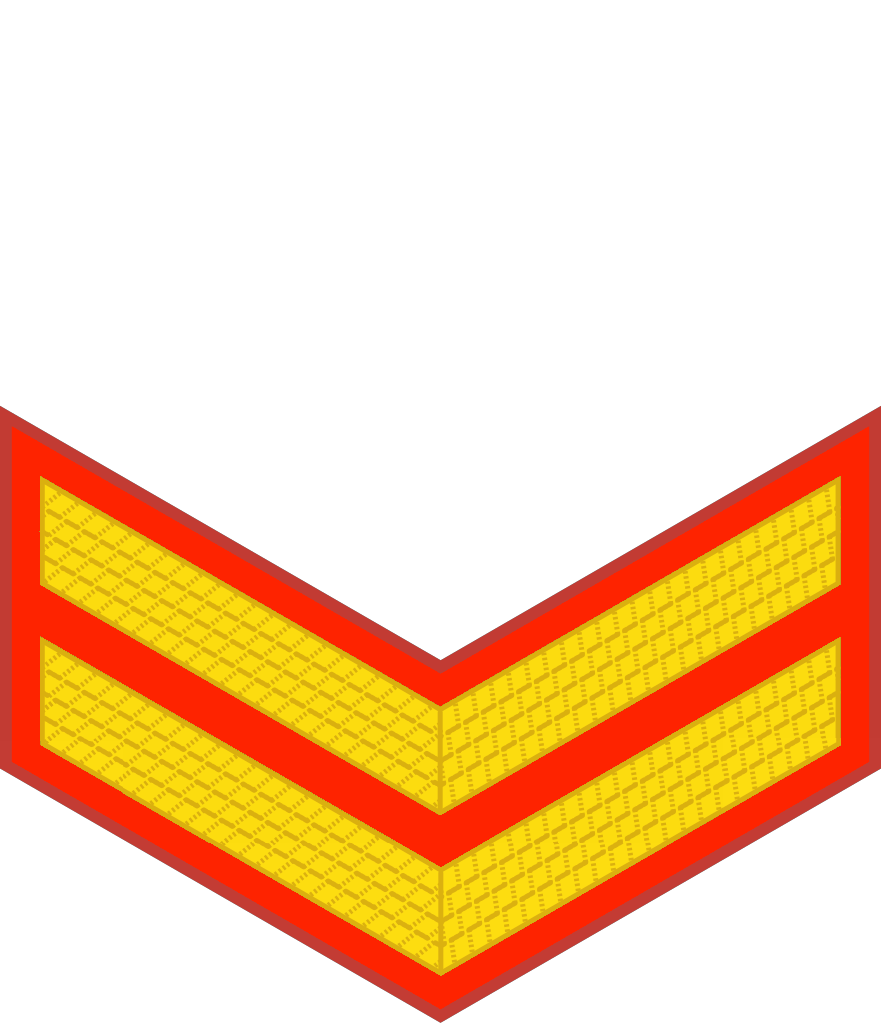
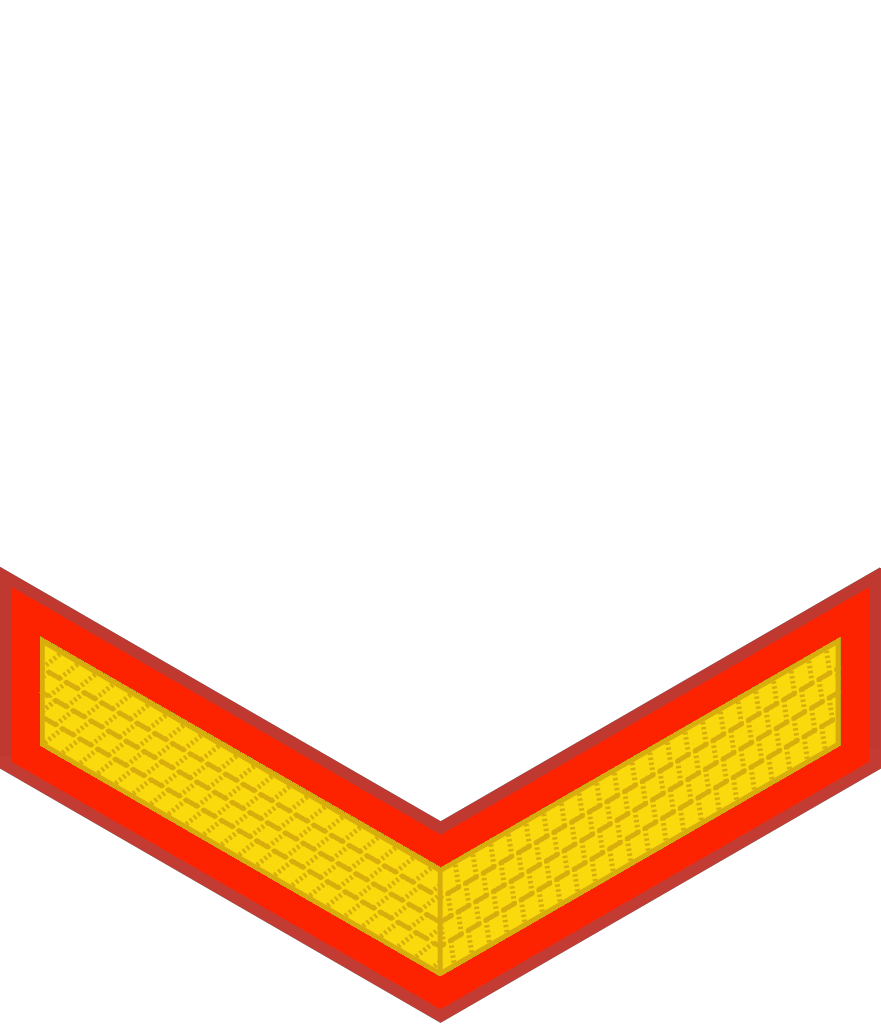
| Rank group | Senior NCOs | | | | Junior NCOs | | Enlisted |
|---|---|---|---|---|---|---|---|
| Umbutfo Eswatini Defence Force | | | | | | | No insignia |
| Umbutfo Eswatini Defence Force | Warrant officer I | Warrant officer II | Staff Sergeant | Sergeant | Corporal | Lance Corporal | Private |

== Branches ==
=== Army ===
The Umbutfo Eswatini Defence Force is the main component of Eswatini's military.

=== Air Force ===
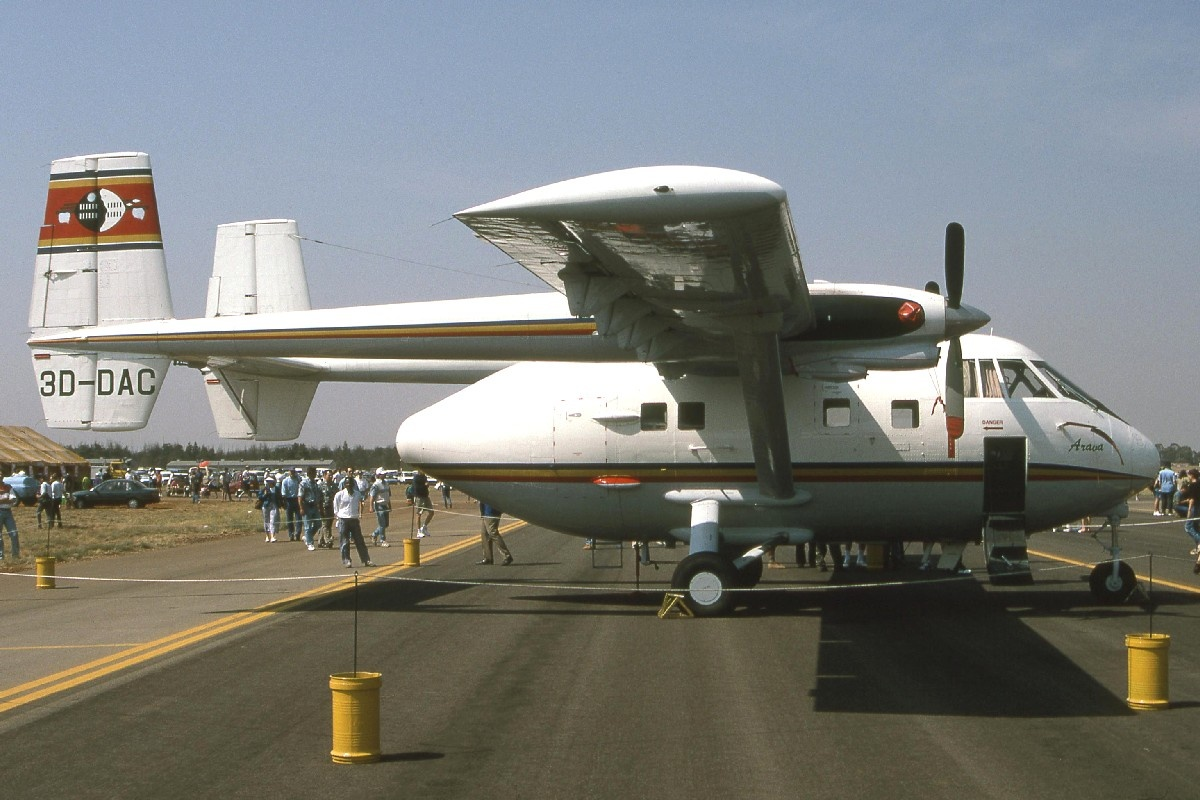
IAI Arava of the Swazi military air wing in 1995

Eswatini maintains a relatively small air wing, part of the Umbutfo Eswatini Defence Force. The air wing is mainly used for transporting the King as well as cargo, and personnel; surveying land with search and rescue functions, and mobilising in case of a national emergency.

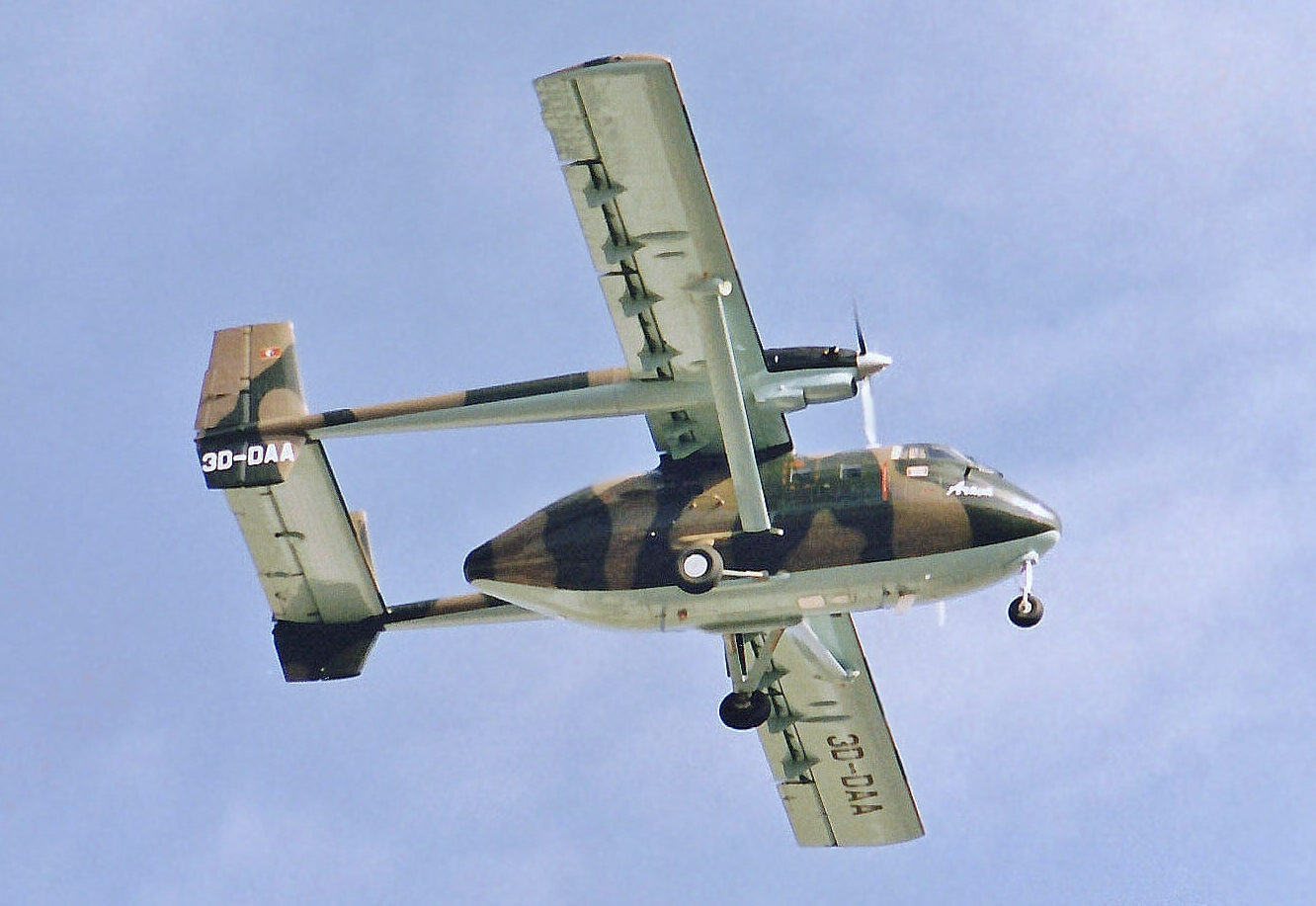
IAI Arava of the Swazi Air Force

Both Arava 201s have crashed; the first was on a demo flight in the 1980s, leaving both pilots dead. The second was lost in 2004, after bad weather caused the flight crew led by pilot army colonel Micheal Ranft to fail to unlock the flight controls lock pin, this was later proven untrue as the crew were cleared that plane's flight controls to not respond to the pilot's yoke. This caused the plane to crash into a sugar cane field after failing to rotate. Although no injuries were reported, the incident left the air force temporarily crippled.

==== Aircraft ====
===== Current inventory =====
| Aircraft | Origin | Type | Variant | In service | Notes |
Helicopter
| Aérospatiale Alouette III | France | utility | | 3 | |
| Bell UH-1 | United States | utility | UH-1H | 2 | donated by the Government of Taiwan |

===== Retired inventory =====
| Aircraft | Country of origin | Type | Versions | Notes |
|---|---|---|---|---|
| IAI Arava | Israel | Cargo plane | IAI 202 | 2 delivered, one crashed in the 1980s, and the other in 2004 |
| Douglas DC-3 | United States | Cargo plane | | |

==== Facilities ====
- Nsingizini Army Barracks
- Mbuluzi Barracks
- Mdzimba Mountain Barracks
- Phocweni Barracks
- Cebisa Barracks
- Zombodze Barracks

==== Units ====
- Ludlalukhala Regiment
- Lindimpi Regiment (watchman/guard)
- Gcina Regiment

== Commanders ==
| No. | Photo | Name (birth–death) | Term of office | | | Ref. |
| No. | Photo | Name (birth–death) | Took office | Left office | Time in office | Ref. |
|---|---|---|---|---|---|---|
| 1 | | Prince Bhekimpi Dlamini (1924–1999) | 15 March 1973 | 10 October 1973 | 4 years, 209 days | |
| 2 | | Major general Prince Maphevu Dlamini (1922–1979) | 10 October 1973 | 25 October 1979 † | 2 years, 15 days | |
| 3 | | Colonel; Jameson Ndzimandze | 12 February 1981 | 8 June 1984 annulled | 3 years, 117 days | |
| 4 | | Brigadier; Roy Gedion Fonono Dube (?–2017) | 8 June 1984 | August 2000 | 16 years, 1 month | |
| 5 | | Lieutenant general Stanley Dlamini (born 1953) | August 2000 | 29 June 2019 | 18 years, 10 months | |
| 6 | | Lieutenant general Jeffrey Sipho Tshabalala (born 1959) | 29 June 2019 | 26 August 2021 resigned | 2 years, 58 days | |
| – | | General; Moses Hulumende Mashikilisana Fakudze (born c. 1963) | 26 August 2021 | 16 May 2022 | 263 days | |
| 7 | | General; Moses Hulumende Mashikilisana Fakudze (born c. 1963) | 16 May 2022 | Incumbent | 4 years, 68 days | |

== Bibliography ==
- Jones, Richard D. Jane's Infantry Weapons 2009/2010. Jane's Information Group; 35th edition (January 27, 2009). ISBN 978-0-7106-2869-5.
