= Nkhaba =

Administrative division of Eswatini

Coordinates: 26.157280°S 31.163910°E

Nkhaba is an inkhundla of Eswatini, located in the Hhohho District. Its population as of the 2007 census was 15,704. Areas under Nkhaba are Jubukweni, Mhlosheni(formerly Forbes Reef) next to Malolotja Game Reserve, Hawane, Mahebedla east and west, Mnyokane, Malanti, Luvinjelweni etc. It is one of the coldest places in Eswatini.

Famous people include Stanley Dlamini, former commander of the Umbutfo Eswatini Defence Force (USDF)
