= Bhekimpi Dlamini =

Prime Minister of Swaziland

Prime Minister of Eswatini
- In office 25 March 1983 – 6 October 1986
- Monarch: Mswati III
- Preceded by: Mabandla Dlamini
- Succeeded by: Sotsha Dlamini

Chief of Nkhaba
- In office 1975–1999
- Preceded by: Chief Mnisi (father; d.1963)
- Succeeded by: Molta Dlamini (regent; wife); Chief Napoleon Dlamini (son)

Personal details
- Born: Bhekimpi Alpheus Dlamini; 26 November 1924
- Died: 1 November 1999 (aged 74)
- Resting place: Mdzimba Mountain
- Children: Majahenkaba Dlamini

Prince Bhekimpi Alpheus Dlamini (26 November 1924 – 1 November 1999) was Prime Minister of Swaziland from 25 March 1983 to 6 October 1986. A nephew of King Sobhuza II, he was also the Chief of Nkhaba until his death on 1 November 1999. Dlamini was also a football player and a World War II veteran for the British Army.

Dlamini was a Swazi politician known to be pro-Apartheid South Africa and traditionalist. In 1983, he was selected as Prime Minister by the Liqoqo (Supreme Council), replacing Prince Mabandla Dlamini after there were conflicts between Mabandla and other members of congress led by Mfanasibili Dlamini during the regency of Queen Dzeliwe. Dzeliwe was against this change and this led to her dismissal from the post of regent to be replaced by Queen Ntombi.

Bhekimpi started persecuting those who had fled the South African apartheid regime. After student protests, he also closed the University of Swaziland; all of these provoked the resurgence of the Movement for Swazi Liberation, then led by Prince Clement Dusima Dlamini. Bhekimpi was dismissed by King Mswati III, his cousin, in 1986 after holding power for only three years.

Political offices
Preceded by Mabandla Dlamini	Prime Minister of Swaziland; 1983–1986	Succeeded by Sotsha Dlamini
