= Swazi people =

Bantu ethnic group of Southern Africa

Swazi
Emaswati
- Flag of the Swati people.

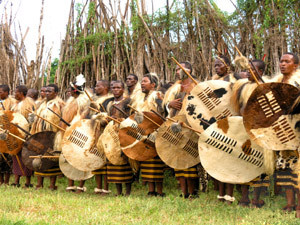
- Swati warriors at incwala

Total population
- c. 2,512,046

Regions with significant populations
- South Africa: 1,297,046
- Eswatini: 1,185,000
- Mozambique: 30,000
- Zimbabwe: 80,500

Languages
- Siswati, English

Religion
- Christianity (Zionist Churches, Catholic), Swazi religion

Related ethnic groups
- Xhosa, Hlubi, Zulu, Ndebele, Sotho, Tsonga. Pedi, Phuthi people, Thembu people

Swati (Swazi)
- Person: liSwati
- People: EmaSwati
- Language: Siswati
- Country: Eswatini

The Swazi or Swati (Swazi: Emaswati, singular Liswati) are a Bantu ethnic group native to Southern Africa, inhabiting Eswatini, a sovereign kingdom in Southern Africa, and South Africa's Mpumalanga province. EmaSwati are part of the Nguni-language speaking peoples whose origins can be traced through archaeology to East Africa where similar traditions, beliefs and cultural practices are found.

The Swati people and the Kingdom of Eswatini today are named after Mswati II, who became king in 1839 after the death of his father King Sobhuza. Eswatini was a region first occupied by the San people and the current Swazis migrated from north East Africa through to Mozambique and eventually settled in Eswatini in the 15th century. Their royal lineage can be traced to a chief named Dlamini I; this is still the royal clan name. About three-quarters of the clan groups are Nguni; the remainder are Sotho, Tsonga, others North East African and San descendants. These groups have intermarried freely. Swazi identity extends to all those with allegiance to the twin monarchs Ingwenyama "the Lion" (the king) and Indlovukati "the She-Elephant" (the queen mother). The dominant Swati language and culture are factors that unify Swatis as a nation.

== History ==
AmaSwati are native to Southern Africa. The term bakaNgwane ("Ngwane's people") is still used as an alternative to emaSwati, to refer to the Swati people. AmaSwati are people who are predominantly descended from Nguni-language speakers. However some of the Swati people originate from Sotho clans who were also inhabitants of Eswatini. Under the leadership of Dlamini III who took over from the Maseko and settlement took place in 1750, along the Pongola River where it cuts through the Lubombo mountains. Later on, they moved into a region on the Pongola River, which was in close proximity to the Ndwandwe people.

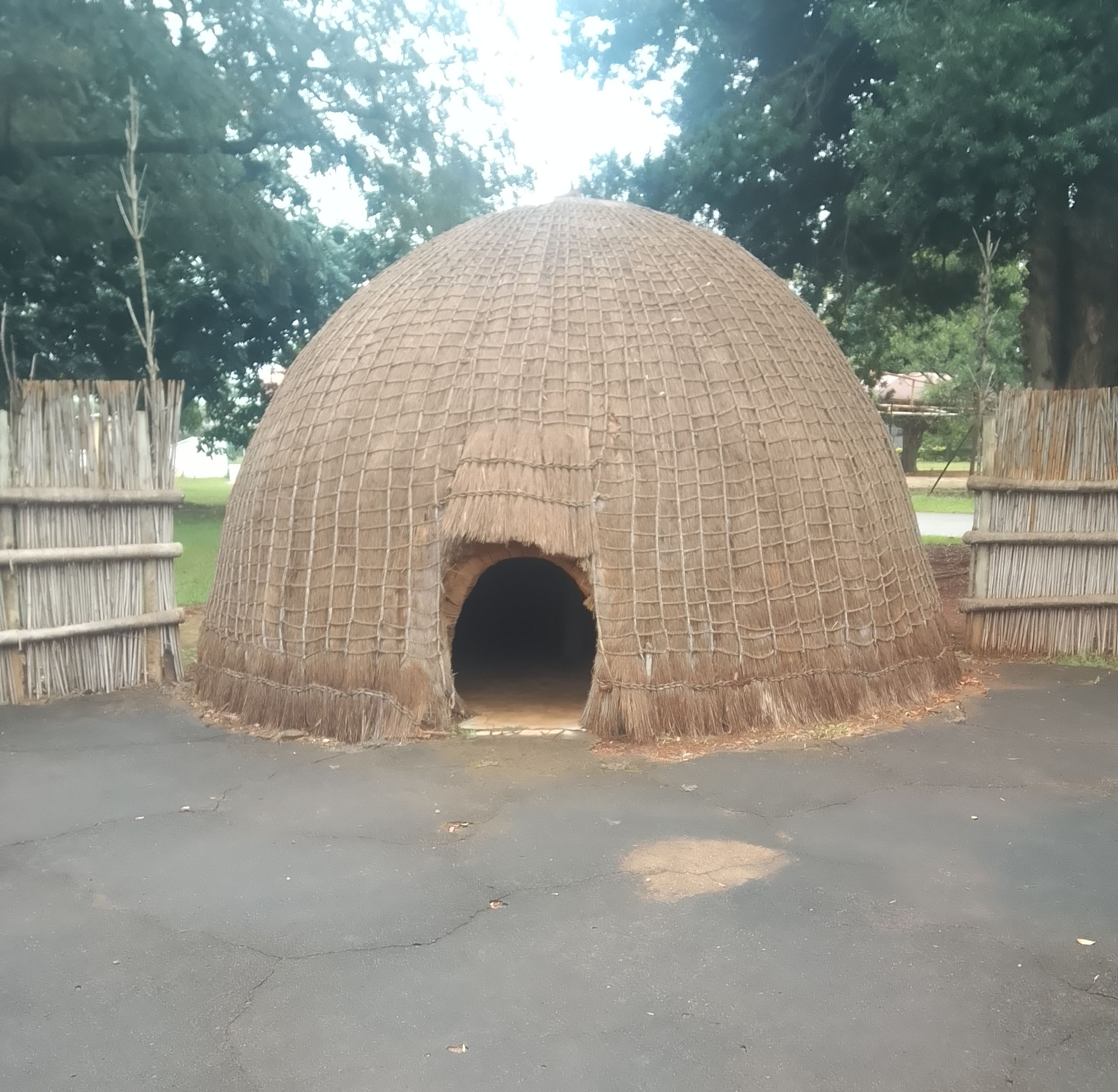
A Swazi traditional house displayed at the Eswatini National Museum, Lobamba

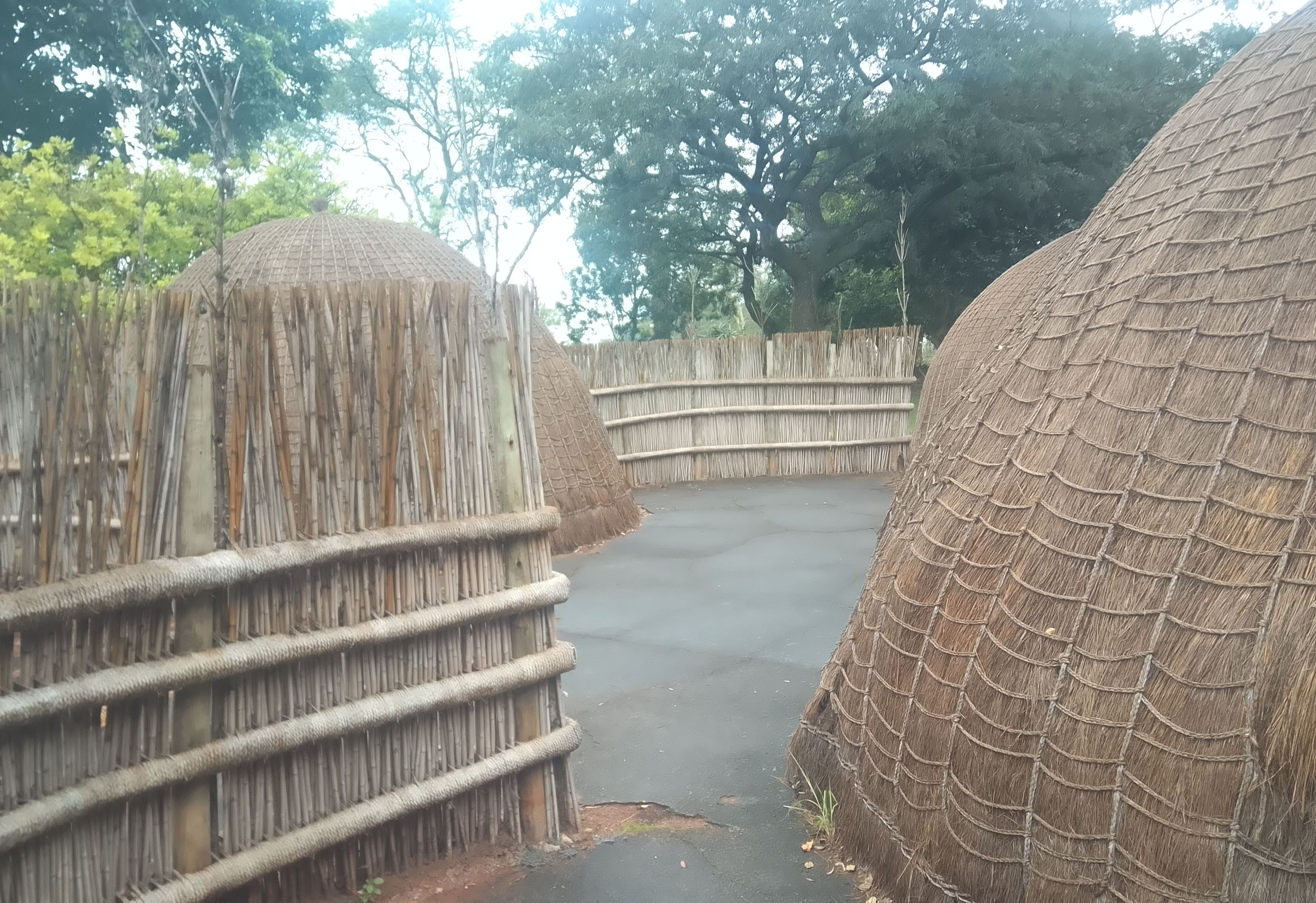

Dlamini III's successor was Ngwane III, who is considered the first King of modern Eswatini. He ruled from around 1745 until 1780 at the Shiselweni region of Eswatini.

In 1815, Sobhuza I became the king of Eswatini and was responsible for the establishment of Swati power in central Eswatini. Here the Swati people continued the process of expansion by conquering numerous small Sotho and Nguni-speaking tribes to build up a large composite state today called Eswatini. Sobhuza I's rule occurred during the Mfecane. Under Sobhuza's leadership, the Nguni and Sotho peoples as well as remnant San groups were integrated into the Swati nation. It was during his rule that the present boundaries of Eswatini were fully under the rule of the Dlamini kings.

In the late 1830s, initial contact occurred with the Boers, who were settling in the territory that would become the South African Republic. A substantial portion of Swati territory was ceded to the Transvaal Boers who settled around the Lydenburg area in the 1840s. The territory of Eswatini, and their king, Mswati II, were recognized by both the Transvaal and Britain. It was during the rule of Mswati II that the Swati nation was unified. Thereafter, the label "Swati" eventually was applied to all the peoples who gave allegiance to the Ingwenyama.

Later under Mbandzeni, many commercial, land, and mining concessions were granted to British and Boer settlers. This move led to further loss of land to the South African Republic. The result was that a substantial Swati population ended up residing outside Eswatini in South Africa. The Pretoria Convention for the Settlement of the Transvaal in 1881 recognized the independence of Eswatini and defined its boundaries. The Ngwenyama was not a signatory, and the Swazi claim that their territory extends in all directions from the present state. Britain claimed authority over Eswatini in 1903, and independence was regained in 1968.

Today, Swati people reside in both Eswatini and South Africa. People of Swati descent in South Africa are typically identifiable by speaking siSwati, or a dialect of that language. There are also many Swati migrants in South Africa and the United Kingdom. The number of emaSwati in South Africa is slightly larger than that of emaSwati in Eswatini, which is approximately 1.2 million people. In modern-day Eswatini, Swati people include all Eswatini citizens regardless of their ethnicity.

== Identity ==
The Kings of Eswatini date back to some considerable time to when the royal line of Dlamini lived in the vicinity of Delagoa Bay.

The Swazi people as a nation were originally formed by 17 clans known as bemdzabuko ("true Swazi") who accompanied the Dlamini kings in the early days. The 17 founding clans were Dlamini, Nhlabathi, Hlophe, Kunene, Mabuza, Madvonsela, Mamba, Matsebula, Mdluli, Motsa, Ngwenya, Shongwe, Sukati, Tsabedze, Tfwala, Mbokane and Zwane. Other Swazi clans are the Emakhandzambili clans ("those found ahead", e.g. the Gamedze, Fakudze, Ngcamphalala and Magagula), meaning that they were on the land prior to Dlamini immigration and conquest. The Emafikemuva ("those who came behind") who joined the kingdom later.

== Culture ==
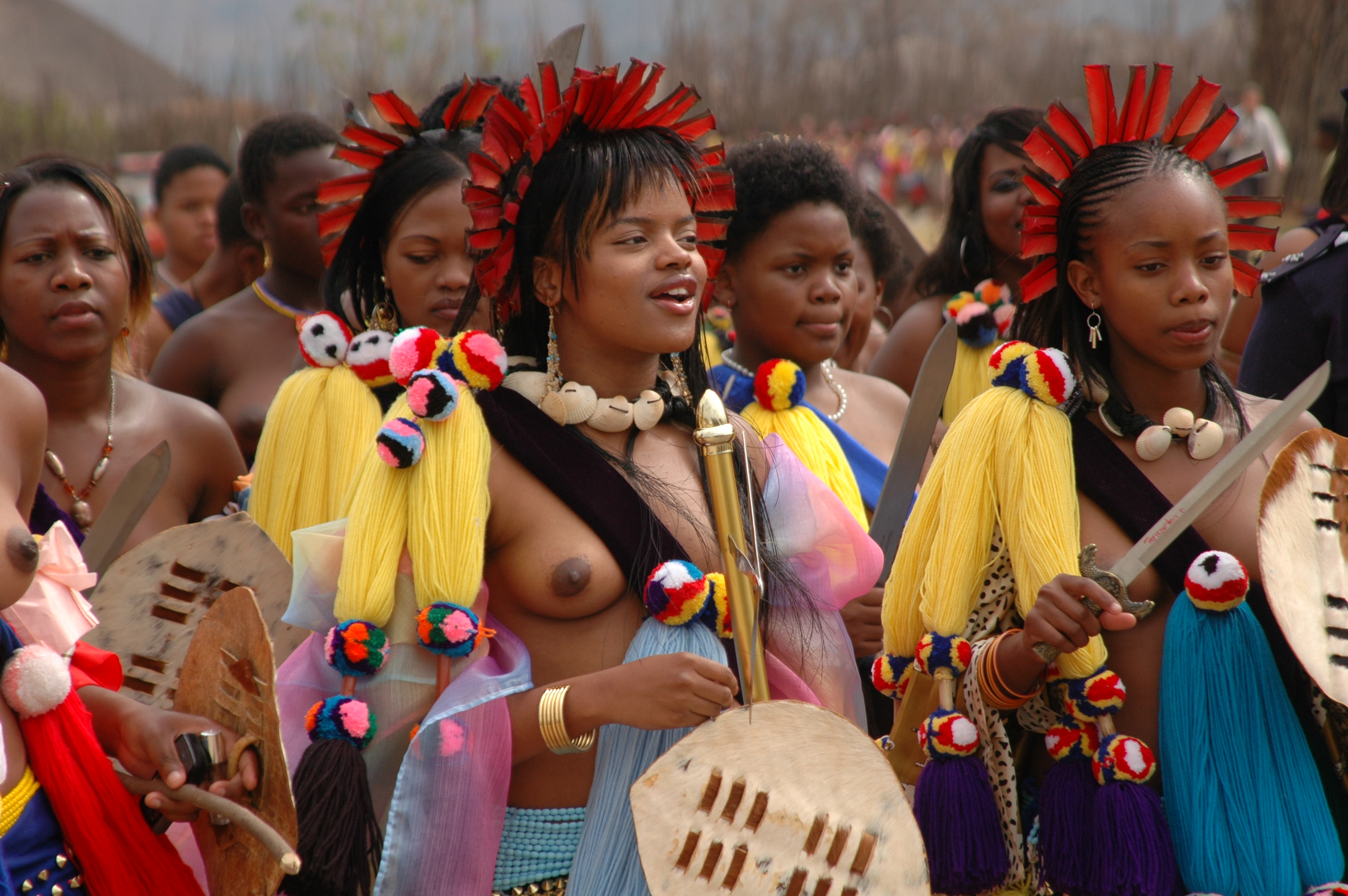
Princess Sikhanyiso dancing at umhlanga

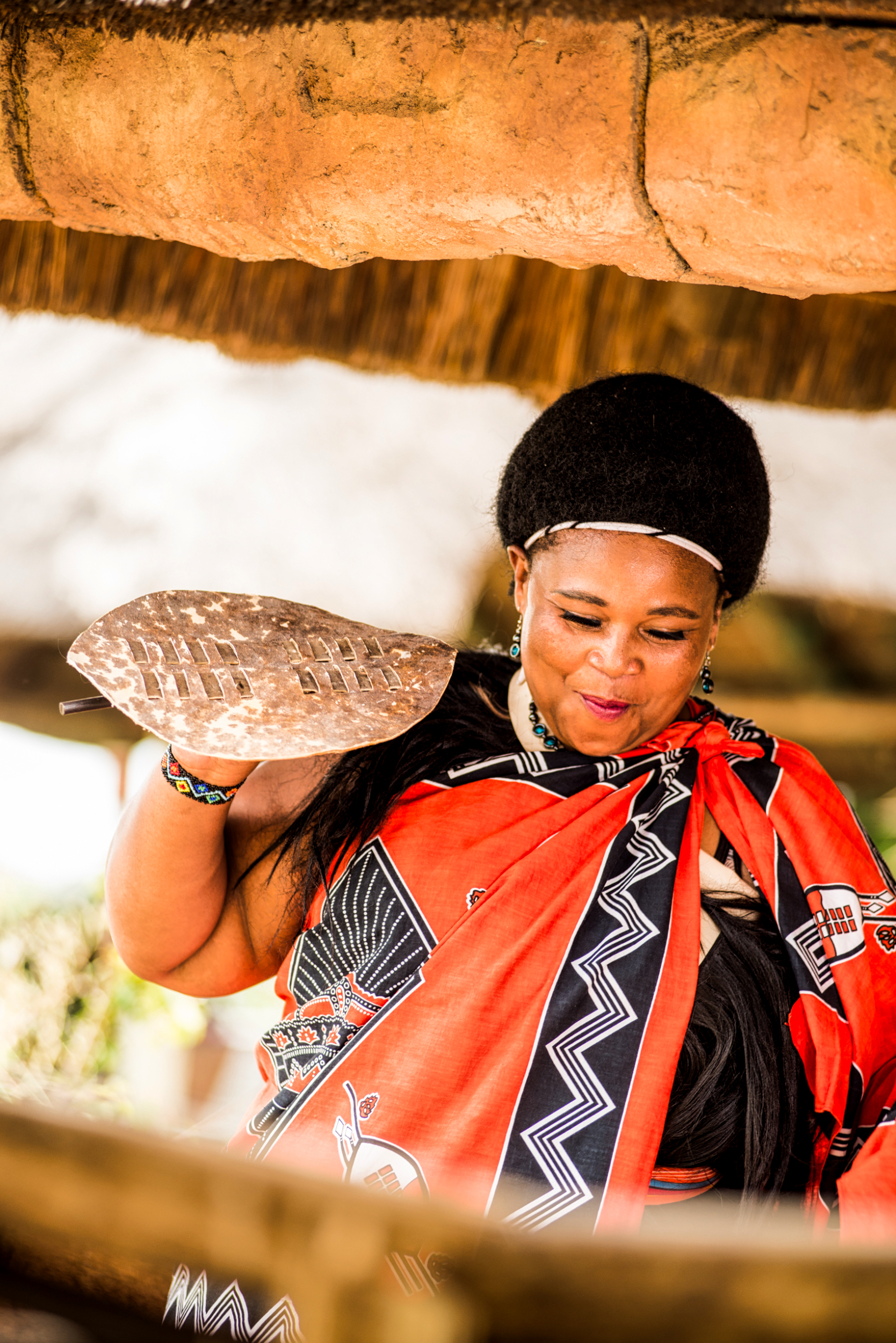
A Swazi woman dancing

Dancing and singing, including praise-singing, are prominent in Swazi culture. Pottery and carving were minor arts.

Swazi traditional marriage is called umtsimba; it is usually on a weekend in the dry season (June to August). The bride and her relatives go to the groom's homestead on Friday evening. On Saturday morning, the bridal party sit by a nearby river and eat goat or cow meat offered by the groom's family; in the afternoon, they dance in the groom's homestead. On Sunday morning, the bride, with her female relatives, stabs the ground with a spear at the groom's cattle kraal; later she is smeared with red ochre. The smearing is the high point of marriage: no woman can be smeared twice. The bride presents gifts to her husband and his relatives.

Umhlanga is one of the most well-known cultural events in Eswatini held in August/September for young unmarried girls to pay homage to the Ndlovukati. Incwala is another Swazi cultural event held in December/January, depending on the phases of the moon. This ceremony, also known as the "First Fruits" ceremony, marks the King's tasting of the new harvest.

== Religion ==
The traditional Swazi religion recognizes a supreme God/creator in its pure form while the ancestors are recognized. The Swazi religion is based on a creator known as Mvelincanti (he who was there from the beginning). Most Swazis intertwine this belief with modern day Christianity that was brought by the missionaries. Many continue to practice their traditional spiritual beliefs. Spiritual rituals are performed at the level of family associated with birth, death and marriage.

== See also ==
- Umtsimba – marriage ceremony
