= Ndwandwe (surname) =

Ndwandwe or Ndwandwa is a surname of Ndwandwe Bantu descent. Notable people with the surname include:

- LaYaka Ndwandwe, Queen of Swaziland (1780)
- Tsandzile Ndwandwel, Queen of Swaziland (1868–1875)
- Nukwase Ndwandwe (c. 1890–1957), Queen of Swaziland (1938–1957)
- Lomawa Ndwandwe (died 1938), Queen of Swaziland (1925–1938)
- Nkosinathi Ndwandwe (born 1959), South African Anglican bishop
- Zihlathi Ndwandwe (died 1975), Queen of Swaziland (1957–1975)
- Phila Portia Ndwandwe (1965–1988), uMkhonto we Sizwe guerrilla fighter
- Sithembiso Ndwandwa (born 1989), South African cricketer
- Tsepo Ndwandwa (born 1995), South African cricketer
- Tshepiso Ndwandwa (born 1996), South African cricketer
