= Abdication of Margrethe II =

2024 succession in the Kingdom of Denmark

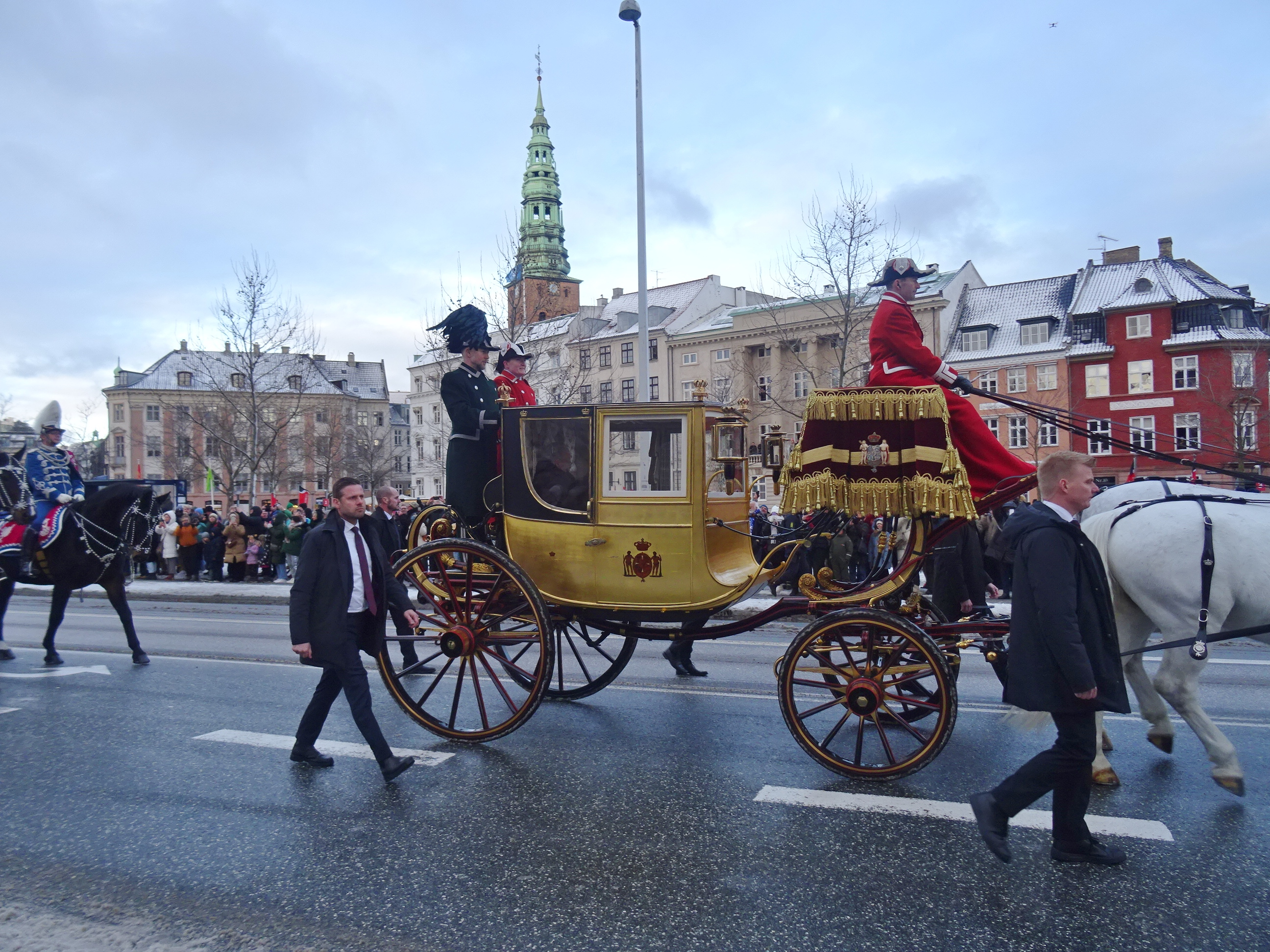
Queen Margrethe II leaving Christiansborg in the Golden Coupé after hosting the New Year's levee for the last time, 4 January 2024

The abdication of Margrethe II as Queen of Denmark took place on 14 January 2024, the 52nd anniversary of her accession, being the first voluntary abdication of a Danish monarch since that of Eric III in 1146.

Margrethe made the announcement of her abdication during her New Year's Eve address on 31 December 2023. On 14 January, she signed a declaration of her abdication during a meeting of the Council of State, whereafter her elder son Crown Prince Frederik succeeded to the Danish throne as King Frederik X. Per Danish state custom, the prime minister of Denmark then proclaimed the accession of the new monarch from the balcony of Christiansborg Palace.

== Background ==
Margrethe had previously said she would never abdicate the throne. In an interview in 2012 to mark her ruby jubilee, she said she would "remain on the throne until [she fell] off" and added, "In my eyes, it's part of the position that you have when you inherit a monarchy: it is a task you have handed down to you, and that you keep as long as you live, the way my father did and my grandfather before him." She rejected the possibility of abdication in an interview in 2016: "In this country we haven't gone in for that way of handing over. It's always been: you stay as long as you live. That's what my father did and my predecessors. And the way I see it too." In another 2016 interview, she said that her son would become king when she is "no longer here".

On 8 September 2022, following the death of her third cousin Queen Elizabeth II of the United Kingdom, Margrethe became Europe's longest-reigning living monarch, the world's only queen regnant, and the longest-serving incumbent female head of state. In an interview earlier that year, she said that Elizabeth had made an "enormous impression" on her: "The fact that she was dedicating her life. I understood what that meant. This is for life. That is the whole point of my life."

== Announcement ==
I have decided that now is the right time. On 14th January, 2024 – 52 years after I succeeded my beloved father – I will step down as Queen of Denmark. I will hand over the throne to my son Crown Prince Frederik.

— Margrethe II, 2023

On 31 December 2023, Margrethe made the surprise announcement of her abdication during her annual New Year's Eve address. She said that time had "taken its toll", and her number of ailments had increased, and she could not undertake as many duties as she managed in the past. She cited her extensive back surgery in February 2023, and said that the operation made her reassess her position and consider "whether now would be an appropriate time to pass on the responsibility to the next generation".

Margrethe thanked the public for their "overwhelming warmth and support" over the years; the changing governments for their "rewarding collaboration"; and the parliament for "always vesting their confidence in me". She expressed her hope that the new king and queen will be met with the "same trust and devotion which have fallen to my lot".

It is understood that, prior to the announcement, the only people aware of Margrethe's intention to abdicate were the Danish prime minister, her cousin King Carl XVI Gustaf of Sweden, and a select few others. She informed her sons of her decision only three days before the announcement.

== Abdication ==
As there is no tradition of abdication in Denmark, Margrethe's abdication was the first time in 878 years that a Danish monarch has voluntarily relinquished the throne; the only other to do so was King Eric III in 1146. Nevertheless, the Act of Succession of 1953 envisages that an abdication can take place, as section 6 of the Act stipulates that specific provisions which are based on the monarch's death also apply when the monarch abdicates the throne.

=== Ceremony at Christiansborg Palace ===
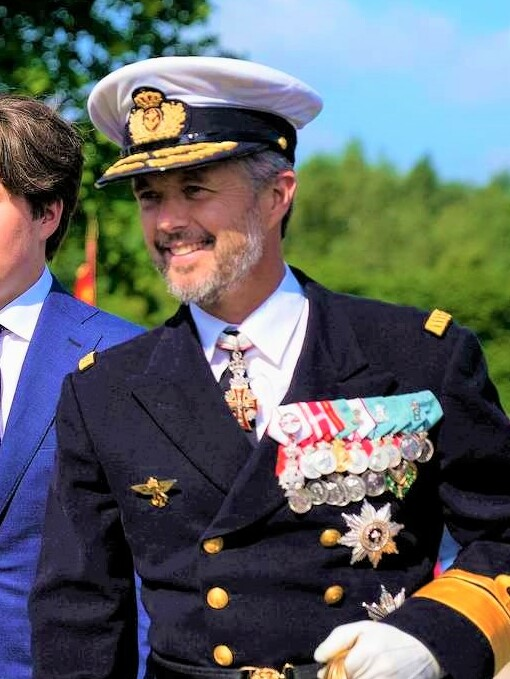
Crown Prince Frederik ascended the Danish throne as King Frederik X following his mother's abdication

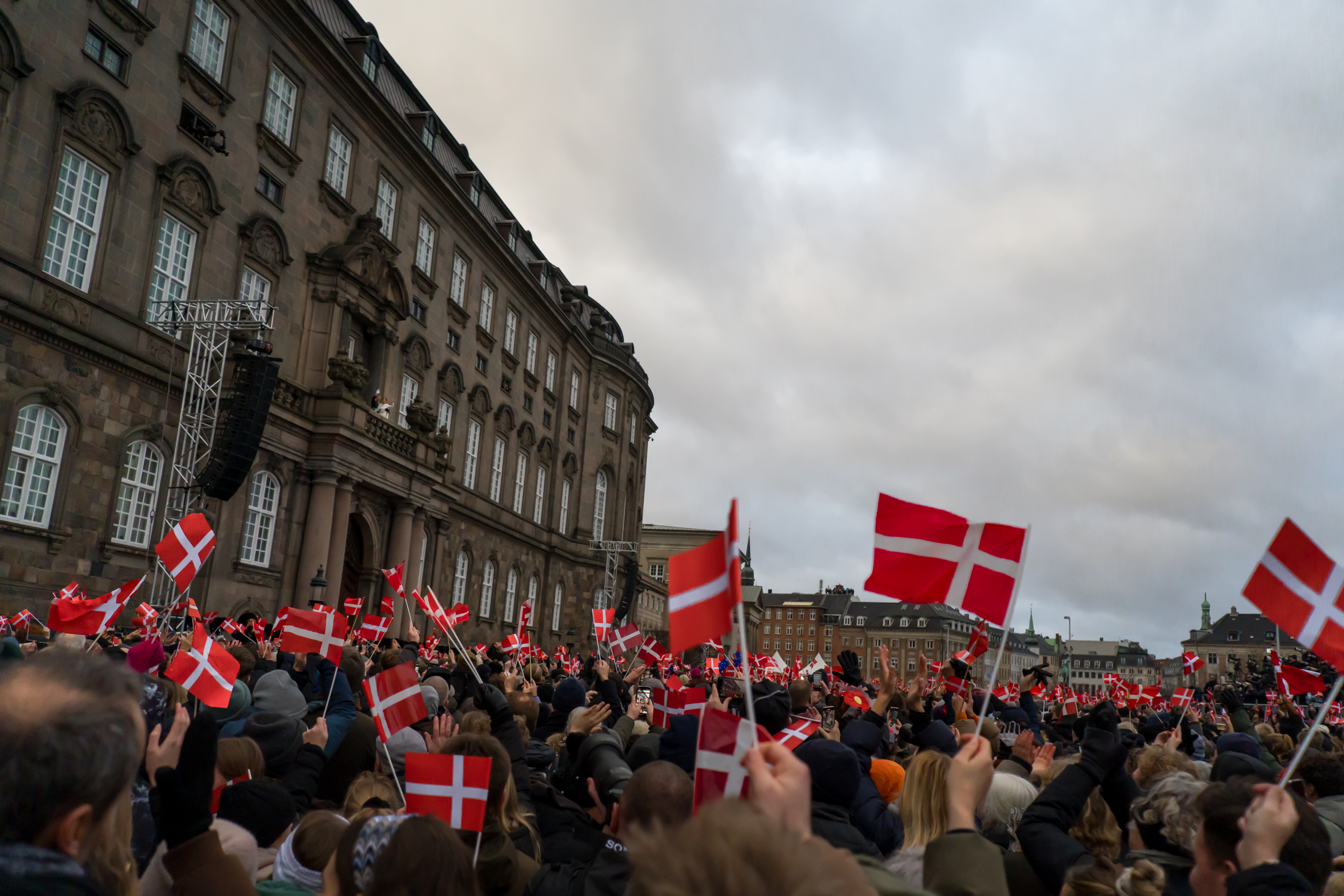
The proclamation of King Frederik X from the balcony of Christiansborg Palace on 14 January 2024

The abdication of Queen Margrethe II took place at Christiansborg Palace on 14 January 2024, the 52nd anniversary of her accession to the throne.

At 13:35 (CET), Crown Prince Frederik, his wife Crown Princess Mary, and their children left Frederik VIII's Palace for Christiansborg Palace. Two minutes later, the Queen made the journey from her residence in Christian IX's Palace to Christiansborg Palace in the Golden Wedding Anniversary Coach.

At 14:00, the Queen, Crown Prince Frederik, and Prince Christian participated in a meeting of the Council of State, with the cabinet ministers and the council of state secretary in attendance. The Queen signed the declaration of her abdication, upon which Frederik acceded the Danish throne as King Frederik X. Margrethe then gave up her seat and offered it to the new King, as the new heir apparent Crown Prince Christian took the seat to the right of the King. A visibly moved Margrethe said "Gud bevare kongen" (God save the king) and left the Council Chamber. After the meeting, the former monarch returned to Christian IX's Palace in a motor car. At 14:30, the new King and Queen hosted a reception for specially invited guests. In a DR interview published in December of the same year, Danish prime minister Mette Frederiksen stated that every detail had been meticulously planned, except those three words: "[I]t is both a queen who abdicates, but also a mother who lifts herself from her chair, physically takes a step behind and stands looking at the king".

At 15:00, Frederiksen proclaimed the new king from the balcony of Christiansborg Palace. According to Danish state custom, the Prime Minister proclaimed three times: "Her Majesty Queen Margrethe II has abdicated. Long live His Majesty King Frederik X!" This was followed by the traditional ninefold cheer from the crowd of 174,000 gathered at Christiansborg Palace Square to witness the proclamation. The King then made a speech and presented his royal motto: "Forbundne, forpligtet, for Kongeriget Danmark" (United, committed, for the Kingdom of Denmark). After his speech, the King was joined on the balcony by his family, including the new Queen Mary and Crown Prince Christian.

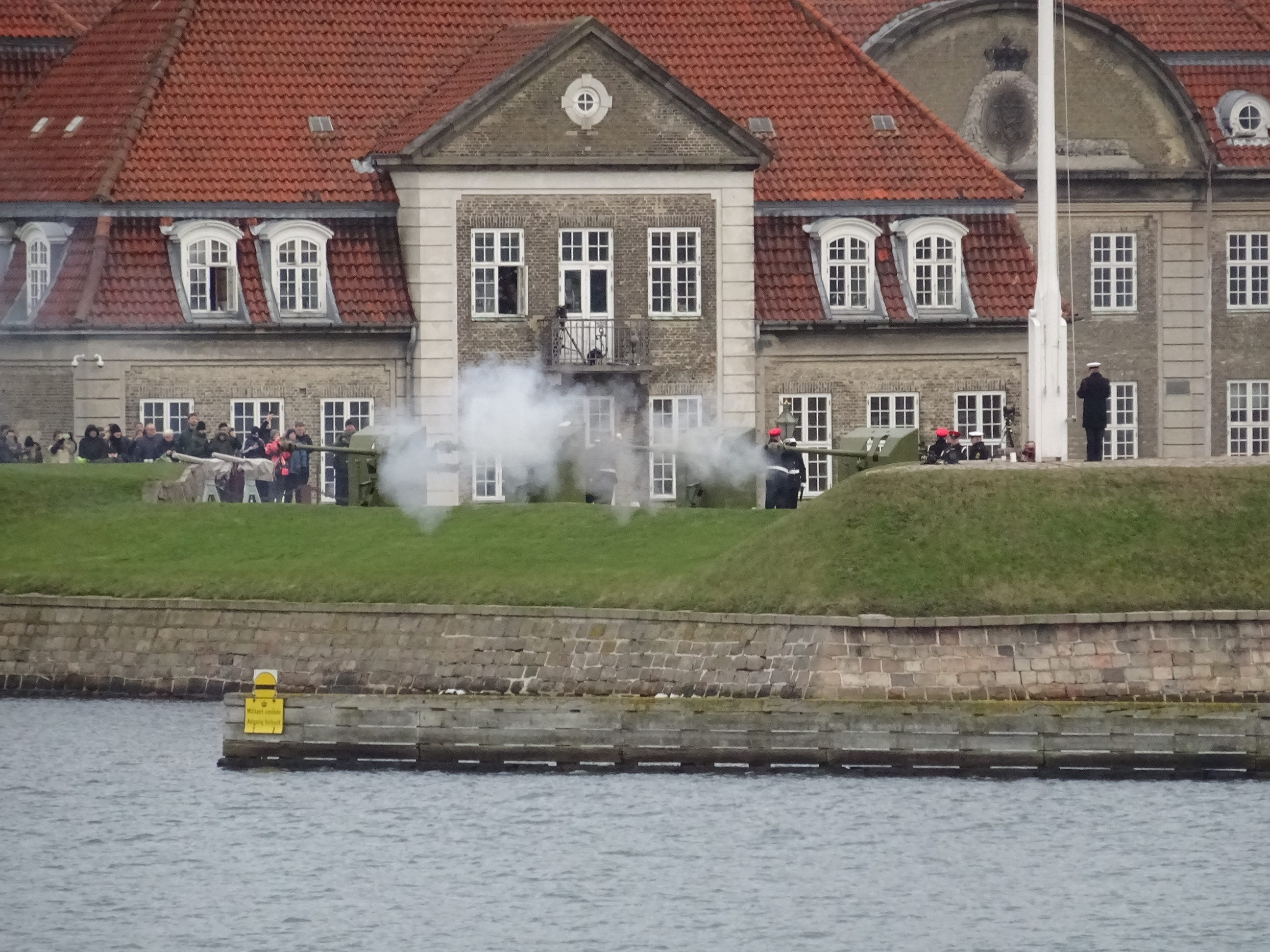
Gun salutes from the Sixtus Battery in Copenhagen after the proclamation of King Frederik X

After the proclamation, gun salutes were fired from the Sixtus Battery on Holmen, Copenhagen. At Amalienborg, the royal standard was lowered at Christian IX's Palace and raised at Frederik VIII's Palace to mark the King's accession. The King and Queen then returned from Christiansborg Palace to their residence in Amalienborg in the Golden Wedding Anniversary Coach, escorted by the Guard Hussar Regiment's mounted squadron. After arriving at Amalienborg, the royal family appeared on the balcony of Frederik VIII's Palace.

At 17:00, royal colours were transferred from Christian IX's Palace to Frederik VIII's Palace to mark the change of monarch. At the Yellow Palace, a book of congratulations was set up from 15:00 to 19:00, to allow the public to send greetings to the King. A congratulation list was also opened on the website of the Danish royal house.

To mark the change of monarch, flags were flown from all state buildings and state ships throughout the Danish Realm on 14 January 2024.

=== Changes in royal titles ===
Following his accession, Frederik X has been styled as "HM The King", and Mary became "HM The Queen". The royal couple are henceforth known as the King and Queen of Denmark. Their son Christian, who became the heir apparent, is referred to as "HRH Crown Prince Christian".

Margrethe II retained the style "Her Majesty" and became known as "HM Queen Margrethe". She also became eligible to be installed as regent in the event of the incapacity of the King and Crown Prince Christian. As regent, Margrethe can perform the duties of the head of state on certain occasions, such as during Frederik and Christian's stays abroad.

=== Commemorative events ===
On 15 January 2024, the King and Queen, and members of the royal family, attended the Danish Parliament's celebration of the King's accession. During a meeting in the Chamber, the Speaker and the Prime Minister delivered speeches, and later, the Prime Minister conveyed the message from the King to parliament. Afterwards, a reception was held in the former Landstinget Chamber.

On 21 January 2024, the royal family participated in a celebratory church service at Aarhus Cathedral with representatives of Denmark and the City of Aarhus in attendance. The service was led by Royal Chaplain-in-Ordinary and Bishop of the Diocese of Aarhus Henrik Wigh-Poulsen.

To mark the abdication, Frederiksborg Castle hosted an exhibition of Queen Margrethe II's portraits, including the famous silkscreen portrait by Andy Warhol as part of his Reigning Queens series. The Danish Broadcasting Corporation and TV 2 teamed up to organise a tribute show for Queen Margrethe titled "Danmarks dronning – den største tak" (Denmark's Queen – the greatest thanks), which was broadcast live from Kongens Nytorv on 12 January 2024. The Danish Broadcasting Corporation also produced the documentary "Dronningen og statsministrene – i al fortrolighed" (The Queen and the Prime Ministers – in complete confidence), which features interviews and archive material about the Queen's relationship with her nine Danish prime ministers.

=== Celebrations in Australia ===
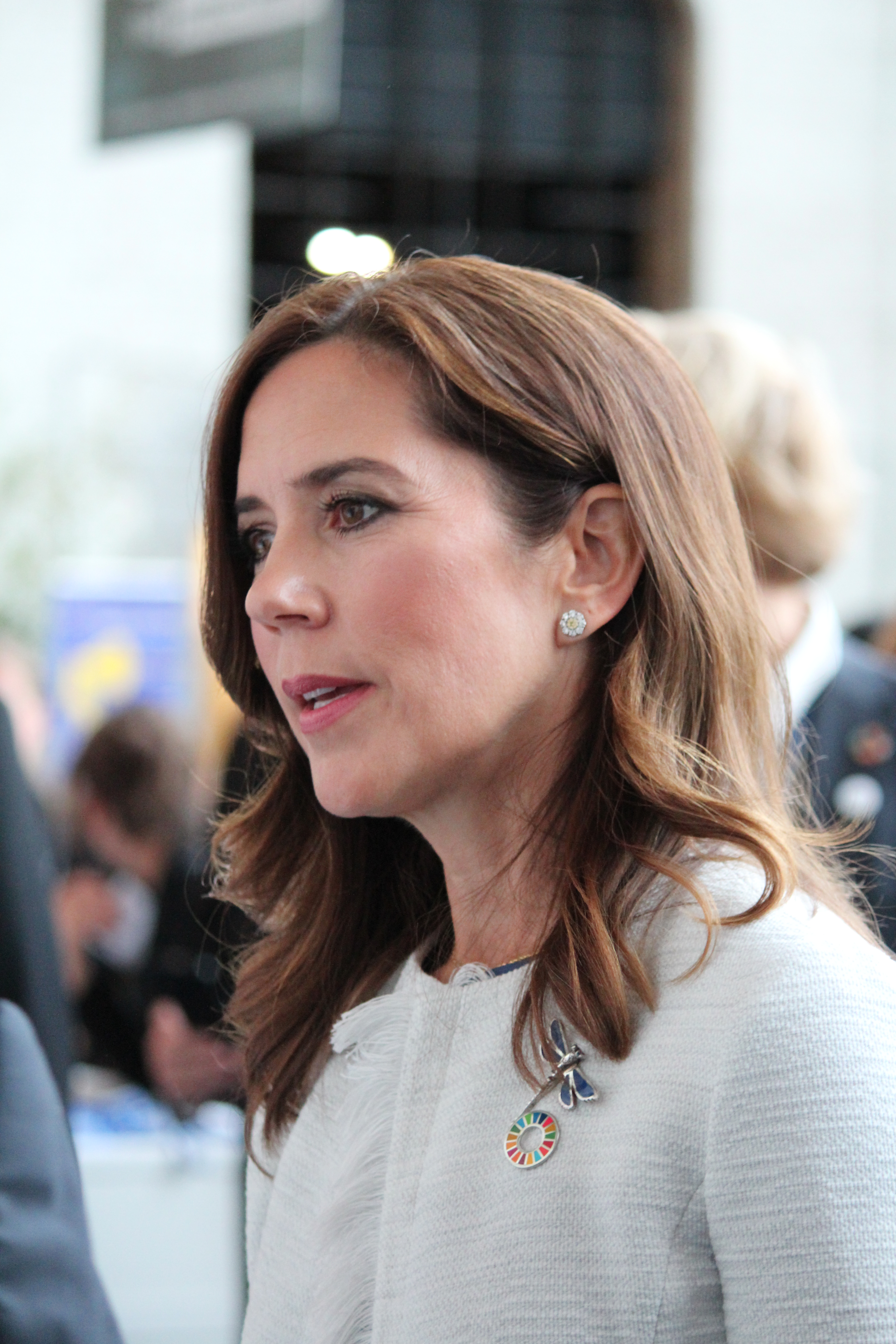
Crown Princess Mary became the first Australian-born queen consort of a European country upon her husband's accession as king

Celebrations were particularly noted in Australia due to Crown Princess Mary, a native of Tasmania, becoming the first Australian-born queen consort of a European country upon her husband's accession as King of Denmark. Public buildings across Tasmania including the Tasman Bridge, the Launceston Town Hall, and Devonport's paranaple convention centre were illuminated in the colours of the Danish flag on 14 January 2024. The Tasmanian Government donated A$10,000 to the Alannah and Madeline Foundation in honour of Queen Mary's international patronage. To mark Mary's elevation to Queen, Prime Minister Anthony Albanese announced the federal government's donation of A$10,000 to Wildcare Tasmania to support the conservation of the Tasmanian devil.

A hand-made Huon pine occasional table was also gifted by the Tasmanian Government to the King and Queen. Hobart Lord Mayor Anna Reynolds marked the occasion by planting a blue gum tree; with the Lord Mayor of Copenhagen planting a reciprocal tree in the Danish capital to honour "the enduring bond between the two cities". The Premier of Tasmania, Jeremy Rockliff, said there was "always an open invitation" for Mary and Frederik to visit Tasmania. Books of congratulations were set up at Government House in Hobart from 15 to 19 January, to allow Tasmanians to congratulate the royal couple.

In Tasmania, celebrations were held at Taroona Beach, while a high tea took place at the Shot Tower in Taroona. Parliament House in Hobart flew the Danish flag on 14 January. In Wollongong, south of Sydney, the Danish Club of Australia hosted Danish expats and their families for a picnic to mark the royal transition. In Melbourne, people gathered at the Danish Club at Denmark House to celebrate.

=== Changes in the Royal House ===
Following the change of monarch, several adjustments were made in the management of the Royal House.

Christian Schønau, chief of the court of Crown Prince Frederik and Crown Princess Mary, succeeded Kim Kristensen as Court Marshal of the Royal House of Denmark on 14 January 2024. On the same day, private secretary Henning Fode resigned after 16 years in office. A new private secretary was not appointed as the required duties are to be carried out by the Court Marshal in the new reign.

In the newly established "Court of Her Majesty Queen Margrethe", Kim Kristensen took office as chief of court. Lasse Harkjær, the Master of Ceremonies resigned on 1 March 2024 to take up the position of Chief of Staff in Queen Margrethe's Court. Harkjær was succeeded as the Master of Ceremonies by Anders Friis on 1 March 2024.

=== Other changes ===
All royal patronages and honorary positions held by Queen Margrethe II, Crown Prince Frederik and Crown Princess Mary ended upon the change of monarch on 14 January 2024, with decision to be made later regarding which patronages would be continued or redistributed. In May 2024, it was announced that the royal patronages had been reduced to 140 from 258, considering the other duties of members of the royal family. The new selection was based on historical relationships as well as on the special focus areas and interests of the royal family. In this new arrangement, patronages would last five years, after which the organisation or association concerned can apply for an extension. This system allows the royal family to take on new patronages as society develops.

All royal warrants ended upon the abdication, as they are given by the reigning monarch. Holders of royal warrants were able to continue to use the title "Purveyor to the Royal House of Denmark" until the warrant ended or one year after the abdication (14 January 2025), with decision to be made later on the future arrangements. In November 2024, it was announced by the Royal House that the royal warrant system would be phased out as it was "no longer in keeping with the times". Existing holders of the royal warrant were allowed to use the designation until 31 December 2029, following which it will no longer be possible to use the designation.

Honorary titles, such as lady-in-waiting, chamberlain and master huntsman, were not affected by the change of monarch, and the same applied to already awarded orders and medals.

== Reactions ==
=== Danish Realm ===
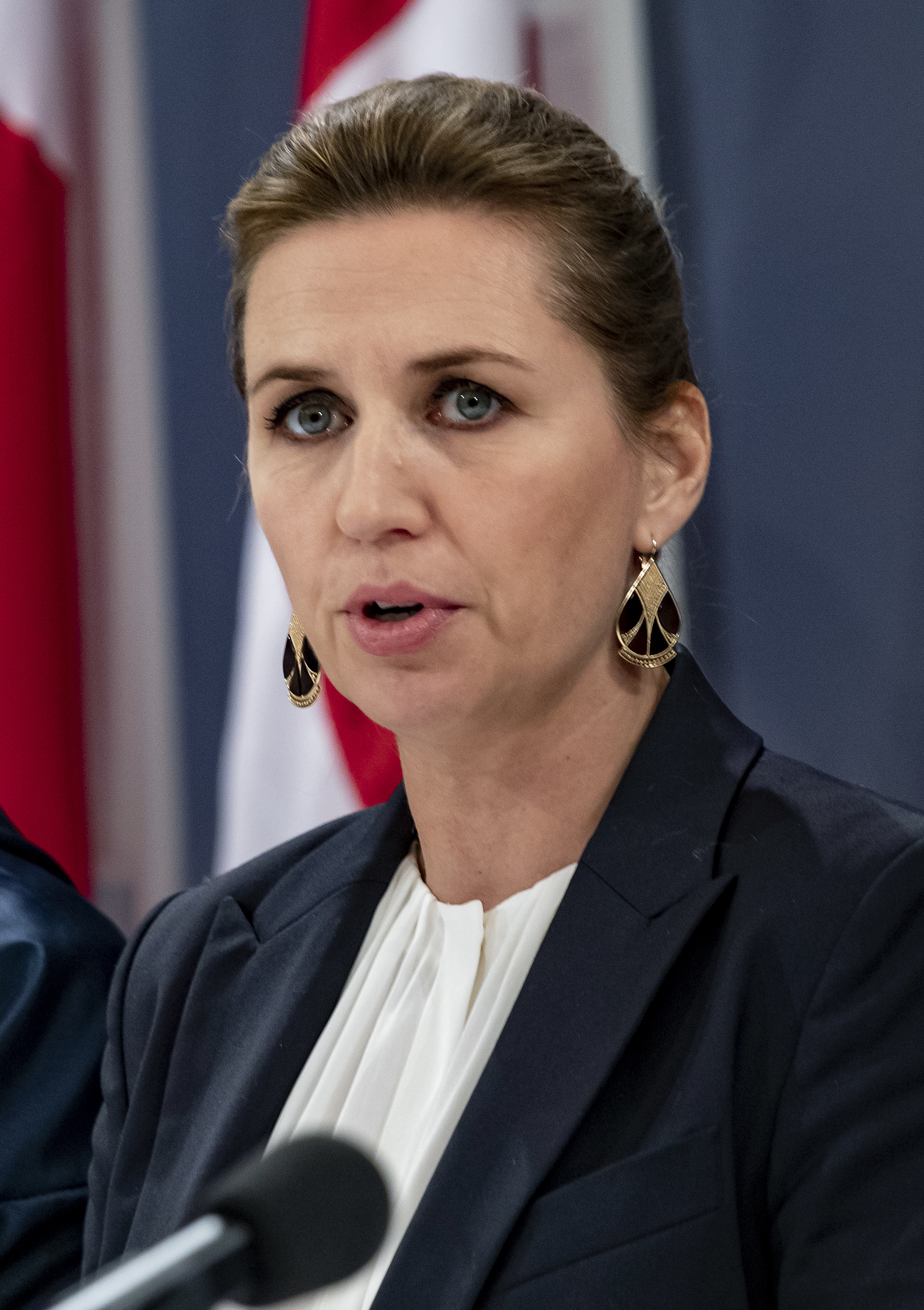
Prime Minister Mette Frederiksen described Margrethe II as the "epitome of Denmark"

The news of Margrethe II's abdication was described as a "surprise" and a "shock", as many people had expected her to remain on the throne until her death. Danish newspapers hailed the Queen for her 52 years of service, with the broadsheet Weekendavisen describing her speech as "personal and perfectly balanced" with "no drama, no unnecessary pathos ... an abdication that can only take place in Denmark."

In a statement, Prime Minister Mette Frederiksen thanked the Queen for "her lifelong dedication and tireless efforts for the Kingdom" and described her as the "epitome of Denmark". In her New Year's address on 1 January 2024, Frederiksen spoke of the shock and disbelief felt by Danes the moment the Queen announced her abdication and said it was "as if time came to a standstill." She thanked the Queen for her years of service and said:

For generations, the Queen has been our rallying mark. A holding point when everything else was in motion. Part of what we come from. And who we are. The Queen has managed to speak to us as a people. Both for new and old Danes. Both for young and old people. And to the whole kingdom – Denmark, the Faroe Islands and Greenland. Through great changes, the Queen has held on to the art, the culture, the virtues, and the ancient wisdom. And an international outlook. To preserve the tradition. Our traditions. And at the same time being a modern head of state for a modern country – it is an art of balance that commands both devotion and respect. It is exactly that renewal that the Queen is continuing with the decision to step down and let a new generation make room. Now we are embarking on a new chapter for Denmark. We will miss Queen Margrethe, whom we love so much. But the fact that the Royal House lives on as an institution is largely the merit of Margrethe the person.

Deputy Prime Minister Troels Lund Poulsen noted that the Queen's decision to abdicate shows both her "wisdom" and the monarchy's "strength and durability for Denmark", and said that the new King "will be able to lead the Danish monarchy safely into a new era, where tradition and renewal will be able to follow each other."

Speaker of the Folketing Søren Gade thanked the Queen for "being a thoughtful and unifying person for the entire Danish kingdom", and said that "by adapting the royal house step by step", Margrethe "managed to renew the royal house as an institution."

Other Danish politicians also paid tribute to the Queen, including Minister of Foreign Affairs and former Prime Minister Lars Løkke Rasmussen, Leader of Liberal Alliance Alex Vanopslagh, Leader of the Social Liberal Party Martin Lidegaard, Leader of the Danish People's Party Morten Messerschmidt, Leader of the Conservative People's Party Søren Pape Poulsen, Leader of the Green Left Pia Olsen Dyhr, Leader of New Right Pernille Vermund, Political spokesperson of the Red–Green Alliance Pelle Dragsted, Lord Mayor of Copenhagen Sophie Hæstorp Andersen, and Mayor of Aarhus Municipality Jacob Bundsgaard.

Aksel V. Johannesen, prime minister of the Faroe Islands, hailed Margrethe as the "epitome of stability and majesty", and thanked the Queen for her "great work and faithfulness."

Múte Bourup Egede, prime minister of Greenland, said that the Queen has been "liked and respected by many Greenlanders", and he thanked Margrethe "for her 52-year reign, dedication and commitment to Greenland".

=== Foreign ===
Several foreign leaders congratulated the new King and Queen following their accession on 14 January 2024.

- Armenia – Armenian President Vahagn Khachaturyan congratulated King Frederik X on his accession, and said he was confident that "under His Majesty's reign, Denmark will continue its further progress and prosperity".
- Australia – Prime Minister Anthony Albanese said he was proud that "Hobart born Mary Donaldson, has become the Queen of Denmark", and said "she has carried herself in a way that I think just brings enormous support and pride to all Australians".
  - Tasmania – The Premier of Tasmania, Jeremy Rockliff, said that Margrethe's "fifty-two years at the helm is an amazing feat", and that Tasmania "could not be prouder of Crown Princess Mary", who was born and raised in Hobart. He said he looks forward to watch "Tasmania's own born Queen lead Denmark's future." Deputy Premier Michael Ferguson said that Mary "epitomises what it means to be Tasmanian: humble, hard-working and quietly pursuing the extraordinary."
- Bahrain – King Hamad bin Isa Al Khalifa wished King Frederik X "every success in continuing Denmark's progress march, following in the footsteps of Her Majesty Queen Margrethe II, to achieve the aspirations of the Danish people". Crown Prince and Prime Minister Salman bin Hamad Al Khalifa also sent a cable of congratulations to King Frederik X.
- Belgium – The Belgian royal palace praised Margrethe for putting the "interests of the Danish nation and Danish people first" during her 52 years as Queen, and wished King Frederik X and Queen Mary "all the best in their new roles".
- Cambodia – In a letter to King Frederik X, King Norodom Sihamoni offered his "warmest congratulations" and expressed his "deep gratitude for the important contribution that the Kingdom of Denmark has made to the process of peace, democratization and economic and social development of the Kingdom of Cambodia".
- China – President Xi Jinping sent congratulations to King Frederik X on his accession to the throne and sent regards and blessings to Queen Margrethe II.
- Finland – President Sauli Niinistö sent a congratulatory letter to King Frederik X and Queen Mary.
- Iceland – President Guðni Th. Jóhannesson thanked Queen Margrethe for her "successful service" and "all her efforts in consolidating the friendship between Iceland and Denmark over the years." He said that Margrethe was "always welcome in Iceland" and that the people of Iceland "will always have good memories" of her. The President also send a congratulatory letter to King Frederik X.
- Ireland – President Michael D. Higgins congratulated King Frederik X on his accession to the throne, and sent his best wishes to Queen Margrethe II.
- Japan – Emperor Naruhito sent a telegram conveying his and Empress Masako's congratulations to King Frederik X, and a telegram expressing his gratitude to Queen Margrethe II.
- Kazakhstan – President Kassym-Jomart Tokayev expressed his gratitude to Queen Margrethe II for her "significant contribution to the development of cooperation between Kazakhstan and Denmark", and sent a telegram of congratulations to King Frederik X.
- Kuwait – Emir Mishal Al-Ahmad Al-Jaber Al-Sabah congratulated King Frederik X on his accession, and hailed the relationship between Kuwait and Denmark as "strong and bound by history".
- Malaysia – Yang di-Pertuan Agong Abdullah and Raja Permaisuri Agong Tunku Azizah Aminah Maimunah Iskandariah congratulated King Frederik X, and expressed their hope that Malaysia and Denmark continue to "enjoy warm and friendly relations, grounded in mutual respect, with a common goal of enhancing economic ties and fostering closer connections among the people".
- Morocco – King Mohammed VI offered his congratulations and best wishes to King Frederik X and Queen Mary for "full success in serving their people".
- Netherlands – King Willem-Alexander, Queen Máxima and Princess Beatrix honoured Queen Margrethe for her "unconditional commitment and extraordinary dedication" to Denmark, and looked forward to meeting King Frederik X and Queen Mary in their new roles.
- Norway – In a letter to King Frederik X and Queen Mary, King Harald V said that the "close friendship between our two families means a lot to all of us", and he praised his cousin Queen Margrethe for being "a present monarch – with an infectious mood and vast knowledge".
- Oman – Sultan Haitham bin Tariq congratulated King Frederik X on his accession, and wished him "success in leading the people of Denmark towards further progress and prosperity".
- Qatar – Emir Sheikh Tamim bin Hamad Al Thani and Deputy Emir Sheikh Abdullah bin Hamad bin Khalifa Al Thani sent separate cables of congratulations to King Frederik X on his accession to the throne of the Kingdom of Denmark.
- Romania – Custodian of the Crown Margareta and Prince Radu sent a congratulatory letter to King Frederik X and Queen Mary. Margareta also wrote to Queen Margrethe II.
- Saudi Arabia – King Salman and Crown Prince Mohammed bin Salman sent separate cables of congratulations to King Frederik X on the occasion of his accession to the throne.
- Spain – King Felipe VI congratulated King Frederik X on the beginning of his reign, with "the greatest personal affection and best wishes for the people of Denmark."
- Sweden – King Carl XVI Gustaf thanked his cousin Margrethe for being "a guarantor of the closeness and affection that today prevails between our countries and houses", and sent his congratulations and "most heartfelt wishes" to King Frederik X and Queen Mary.
- Thailand – King Maha Vajiralongkorn congratulated King Frederik X on his accession, and wished for "the enduring peace and prosperity of the Kingdom of Denmark and her people".
- Turkmenistan – President Serdar Berdimuhamedov extended his congratulations and best wishes to King Frederik X, saying he was sure that "Denmark's high socio-economic progress will be achieved under your rule, and our bilateral relations will be given a new impetus".
- United Arab Emirates – President Sheikh Mohamed bin Zayed Al Nahyan, Vice President and Prime Minister Sheikh Mohammed bin Rashid Al Maktoum, and Vice President and Deputy Prime Minister Sheikh Mansour bin Zayed Al Nahyan sent messages of congratulations to King Frederik X on his accession to the throne.
- United Kingdom – King Charles III, Margrethe's third cousin once removed, paid tribute to her many years of service and fondly remembered the frequent royal visits between the two countries, including his visit to Copenhagen and Elsinore in 2012.
- United States – President Joe Biden thanked Queen Margrethe for "her enduring commitment to deepening the partnership between our two nations", and said her "52-year reign spanned ten U.S. presidents, an era during which the Kingdom of Denmark and the United States moved closer together as security and trade partners, while the bonds of friendship between our people grew ever stronger."
- Vietnam – President Võ Văn Thưởng and Vice President Võ Thị Ánh Xuân sent messages of congratulations to King Frederik X on his accession. In offering his congratulations at the Danish Embassy in Hanoi, Deputy Foreign Minister Hà Kim Ngọc noted his belief that Denmark will further prosper under the reign of King Frederik X.
