= Seneleleni Ndwandwe =

Ndlovukati of Swaziland
- Reign: 1975 – 1980
- Predecessor: Zihlathi Ndwandwe/Mkhatjwa
- Successor: Dzeliwe Shongwe
- King: Sobhuza II
- Died: 1980

Seneleleni Ndwandwe (died 1980), also known as Seneleni Nxumalo, was Ndlovukati (queen mother) of Swaziland during the reign of Sobhuza II. She was full sister and co-wife to her predecessor, Zihlathi Ndwandwe.
