= Coat of arms of Eswatini =

National coat of arms of the Kingdom of Eswatini

- Armiger: King Mswati III
- Adopted: 1968
- Crest: A Crown of feathers proper
- Torse: Azure and Or
- Shield: Azure, a Swazi battle shield with decorations, all proper
- Supporters: To the dexter, a Lion and to the sinister an Elephant, both proper
- Motto: Siyinqaba "We Are The Fortress"

The coat of arms of Eswatini is a coat of arms depicting various symbols for traditional Eswatini culture. The lion represents the King of Eswatini and the elephant represents the Queen-mother. They support a traditional Nguni shield which represents "protection", the palm leaves represent a traditional crown of Swatinian. Above the shield is the King's lidlabe, or crown of feathers, normally worn during Incwala (the festival of the harvest). On a banner below the shield is Eswatini's national motto, Siyinqaba, meaning, "We are the fortress".
