= Nukwase Ndwandwe =

Queen Mother of Swaziland (c. 1890–1957)

Ndlovukati of Swaziland
- Reign: 1938–1957
- Predecessor: Lomawa Ndwandwe
- Successor: Zihlathi Ndwandwe/Mkhatjwa
- King: Sobhuza II
- Born: c. 1890
- Died: 15 September 1957

Nukwase Ndwandwe (c. 1890 – 15 September 1957) was the Queen Mother of Swaziland, aunt of Sobhuza II, and the sister of Lomawa Ndwandwe.

== Early life ==
King Ngwane V died in 1899, during Ndwandwe's childhood. Owing to hereditary considerations, the royal family consequently brought Ndwandwe into the late Ngwane V's harem. Subsequently, Ndwandwe bore two sons and two daughters to Malunge, Ngwane V's younger brother, in the name of Ngwane V.
