= Mfanasibili Dlamini =

Swazi prince and minister (c.1938–2016)

Prince Mfanasibili Dlamini (1939 – 15 March 2016) of Swaziland was the son of Prince Makhosikhosi who was brother to King Sobhuza II.

He was born in 1939 in Manzini District. In 1964 he was elected to the Legislative Council of Swaziland. In 1967 he was elected to House of Assembly and then appointed as minister of local administration. After 1972 he was appointed by King Sobhuza to the Senate and also minister of commerce and cooperatives. He was a cabinet minister during the reign of Sobhuza II and became a powerful member of the Liqoqo council during the subsequent regency (1983–1986). He orchestrated the removal of Queen Dzeliwe Shongwe as regent and saw that the Queen Ntfombi Tfwala replaced her. After Prince Makhosetive was installed on the throne, Mfanasibili was convicted of "defeating the ends of justice", by attempting to use "muti" to "take away the (supernatural) powers" of King Mswati III, during the regency and sentenced to seven years in prison. Mfanasibili was later given a royal pardon.

At the time of his death 'Prince Mfanasibili was living with his wife and children in Manzini, where he served on the city council, and discharged his duties on behalf of the royal family. He was very active in Swazi politics and his articles were at one time featured weekly in the Sunday Times newspaper. '

Prince Mfanasibili died aged 77 on 15 March 2016.
