= Dzeliwe =

Queen regnant of Eswatini (1927–2003)

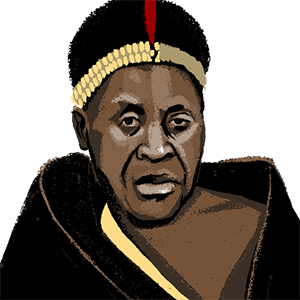
- An illustration of Dzeliwe produced by Voice of America

Queen Mother of Swaziland
- Reign: 1980–1983
- Predecessor: Seneleleni Ndwandwe
- Successor: Ntfombi Tfwala
- King: Sobhuza II (until 1982); None (since 1982)

Queen regent of Swaziland
- Regency: 1982–1983
- Predecessor: Sobhuza II (as king)
- Successor: Ntfombi Tfwala (as queen regent)
- Born: 1927
- Died: 2003 (aged 75–76)
- Spouse: Sobhuza II (died 1982)
- Issue: Prince Khuzulwandle
- House: Dlamini (by marriage)

Inkhosikati LaShongwe (born Dzeliwe Shongwe; 1927 – 2003) was queen regent of Eswatini between 1982 and 1983. She was a wife of King Sobhuza II of Eswatini, and with him had one child, Prince Khuzulwandle Dlamini.

After the death of her husband in August 1982, the Royal Congress named Dzeliwe as queen regent, and Prince Sozisa Dlamini as the "Authorized Person", or regent's advisor, until Prince Makhosetive, designated by the king as his successor, reached the age of eighteen. The Liqoqo (a traditional advisory body) supported her regency, but soon there were disagreements between her prime minister, Mabandla Dlamini, and other members of Congress led by Mfanasibili Dlamini. These problems continued until 25 March 1983, when Prince Mabandla was replaced by Prince Bhekimpi Dlamini. Queen Dzeliwe opposed this dismissal, and this led to her being replaced by Ntfombi (the mother of Prince Makhosetive), as regent later that year.

Prince Makhosetive was crowned on 25 April 1986 with the name of King Mswati III of Eswatini. In May, Mswati dissolved the Liqoqo, consolidating his power and reorganising the government. In May 1987, twelve people were accused of sedition and treason in relation to the overthrow of Queen Regent Dzeliwe in 1983. King Mswati created a special tribunal to judge these crimes against the King or the Queen Regent, in which the defendants did not have the right to legal representation. In March 1988, they were prosecuted by the tribunal, although they were set free in July.

Between 1981 and 1985, Queen Dzeliwe also maintained the post of Joint President of the National Congress.

She died in 2003.

Regnal titles
Preceded by Sobhuza II of Swaziland	Queen Regent of Eswatini; 1982–1983	Succeeded by Ntfombi Tfwala
