= Prince Sozisa Dlamini =

Swazi prince (died 1992)

Prince Sozisa Dlamini of Swaziland (c. 1912 – 1992) was Chief of Gundvwini. He became the Authorized Person of Swaziland from 1982 to 1985 after the death of King Sobhuza II. From 1983 he was Authorized Person to the new Queen Regent, Ntfombi, with greater powers. Although lacking the title, he was for most purposes the de facto ruler of the country. He fell from power in July 1984, after being accused of planning a coup, and was suspended as Authorized Person until Queen Ntfombi terminated his appointment on 1 November 1985.

== Life ==
Flag of Swaziland

Prince Sozisa, who was already Senior Prince of the Swazi Nation, played a leading role in the negotiations which led to independence from the United Kingdom in 1968. For many years he was one of King Sobhuza II's closest advisers and a significant figure in the country.

Following the death of King Sobhuza in August 1982, Prince Sozisa Dlamini held the powerful office of 'Authorised Person', the leading role among the Elders of the Nation, having been designated as such by the king before he died.

At the time, there was no certainty about who would inherit the throne, and Sobhuza's widow Queen Dzeliwe was chosen by a secret tribal process to assume the regency. At the same time Prince Sozisa was announced as the Queen's principal advisor, when The Times described him as "an elderly and hitherto obscure relative of the late king who bears the delightful title of the Authorized Person". A senior member of the Liqoqo, a supreme council of tribal elders, in practice Sozisa was believed to be in charge of the Swazi government, although nominally Mabandla Dlamini was Prime Minister. At the beginning of 1983, Sozisa was still the Queen's advisor, although reported to be "in poor health". On 20 March 1983, Sozisa chaired a press conference at the main royal kraal at Lobamba, supported by the cabinet ministers Polycarp Dlamini, Richard Dlamini, and Prince Gabneni, and announced that Mabandla Dlamini had been dismissed as Prime Minister. The next day, Mabandla went to his office as usual, claiming that the Queen had not yet informed him. It was later uncertain that she had approved a change of prime minister, but a week later, Mabandla had been replaced by Bhekimpi Dlamini, another member of the royal house. The key to the change was thought to be that Bkekimpe was more receptive to a South African proposal to transfer to Swaziland most of the homeland of KaNgwane, an area of some 7,800 square kilometres (3,000 sq mi) with a notional population of 800,000, including a length of coast on the Indian Ocean.

In July 1983 there was an announcement of elections planned for October. At that time, the country was said to be under the control of the Liqoqo.

On 9 August 1983, Queen Dzeliwe was dismissed as Regent and placed under house arrest. A notice of her dismissal, signed by Prince Sozisa, appeared in the Government Gazette the same day. Ntfombi was chosen as the new Queen Regent. Her fourteen-year-old son Mswati emerged from the power struggle as Crown Prince, and in 1986 he was crowned King as Mswati III. One of Ntfombi's first acts as regent was to give delegated powers to the Authorized Person, who was still Sozisa, to sign state documents making decisions on a number of matters of national importance. This change had been demanded by the 'Tibiyo' faction. Subsequently, the constitution was revised to provide that where the Regent and the Authorised Person were not in agreement on any matter, it must be referred to the princes and the chiefs.

On 13 September 1983, Sozisa made a speech in which he condemned the Soviet Union, and on 12 October three of his political opponents were charged with sedition.

== Fall from power ==
At the beginning of July 1984, the Swazi Observer reported that Sozisa, although chairman of the Liqoqo, was no longer attending its meetings. At about the same time, his police and military escorts ceased to guard him. Sozisa continued as the Authorized Person until the end of August 1984, when the Liqoqo suspended him, amid allegations that he had attempted a coup d'état in June. He was later reported to have gone into hiding in Siteki, under heavy guard. The official announcement of the termination of Sozisa's appointment as Authorized Person was not published until a year later. After this, he fell out of the news. He was reported to have died in 1992.

Sozisa continued as Chief of Gundvwini until his death, when he was succeeded as acting Chief by his brother Prince Tfohlongwane Dlamini, who remained in the post until 2001, when he became chairman of the Swaziland National Council Standing Committee. In that year, Prince Mangaliso Dlamini became Chief of Gundvwini.

== See also ==
- History of Swaziland
