= Labotsibeni Mdluli =

Swazi royal regent

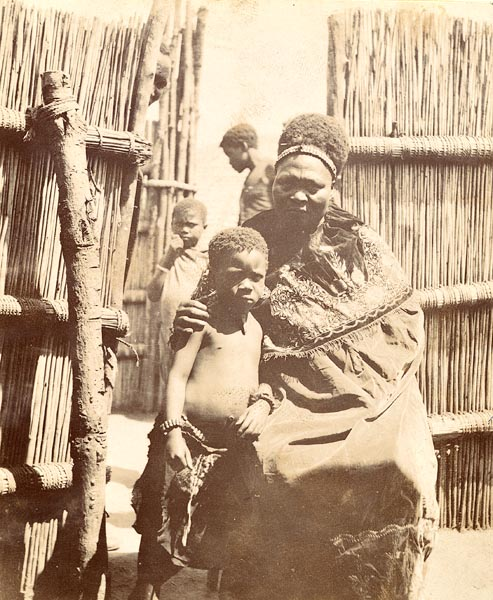

Ndlovukati of Swaziland
- Reign: 1895–1921
- Predecessor: Tibati Nkambule
- Successor: Lomawa Ndwandwe
- King: Bhunu (until 1899); Sobhuza II (since 1899)

Queen regent of Swaziland
- Regency: 1899–1921
- Born: c. 1859; Luhlekweni, Swaziland
- Died: 15 December 1925 (aged 65/66); Zombodze, Swaziland
- Burial: Mbilaneni
- Spouse: Mbandzeni of Swaziland
Posthumous name
- KaGogo (eSwatini)
- House: Mdluli (by birth); Dlamini (by marriage)
- Father: Matsanjana Mdluli
- Occupation: Queen

Labotsibeni Mdluli (c. 1859 – December 15, 1925), also widely known as Gwamile, was a Queen Mother and later Queen regent of Swaziland (now Eswatini). She is remembered as one of the most influential political leaders in Eswatini’s history, known for her diplomatic skill, her defense of Swazi sovereignty during the colonial era and her strong leadership during a period of rapid political and economic change in southern Africa.

== Early life ==
Gwamile was born at Luhlekweni in northern Swaziland around 1859, the daughter of Matsanjana Mdluli. At the time of her birth, her father was away fighting the people of Tsibeni in what became the Barberton district of the Transvaal, hence her name. This conflict, in which her father was embroiled at the time of her birth, was part of King Mswati II’s ongoing efforts to solidify his rule and consolidate the boundaries of his kingdom. Notably, the Mdluli clan, to which she belonged, was among the high-ranking members of the Swati aristocracy. This distinguished lineage would later become significant in determining the succession to the throne when one of her sons emerged victorious. Her father died circa 1870, and she came under the guardianship of her uncle, the Chief, also known as her 'babe lomncane' in Swati culture. Chief Mvelase, who also resided at the royal court of Ludzidzini which is situated at the Ezulwini Valley central Swaziland, brought her with him. At court, she was known as 'LaMvelasi', a Swati custom of addressing women by their maiden or father’s name, even after marriage. Uniquely, she was named after her influential adoptive father or uncle, further enhancing her status.

Historian Hilda Kuper notes that growing up in the royal palace afforded her the advantage of acquiring “knowledge of court etiquette, insights into the political dynamics of the era, and a sense of self-assurance”. These experiences would later contribute to her distinguished leadership. She served as an attendant to the old queen mother, Tsandzile Ndwandwe ('LaZidze'), the widow of King Sobhuza I and mother of Mswati II. Tsandzile was a formidable figure in her own right, credited with significant contributions to the formation of the Swati Nation.

== Marriage ==
She became one of the wives of the young Ingwenyama or king of the Swazi, Mbandzeni Dlamini (c. 1857–1889), soon after his succession in 1874. They had four surviving children, three sons, Bhunu (c. 1875–1899), Malunge (c. 1880–1915), and Lomvazi (c. 1885–1922), and a daughter, Tongotongo (c. 1879–1918).

Labotsibeni's husband, King Mbandzeni (also known as Dlamini IV) was described as an attractive person, and an essentially fair-minded ruler, who was unable to stop, and may indeed have encouraged, the army of concession-hunters who invaded his country in the wake of the gold rush to Barberton in the late 1880s. By the time of his death in October 1889 he had granted numerous overlapping and conflicting land concessions, and a variety of equally contentious monopolies, including one which purported to give its holder the right to collect ‘the king's private revenue’. Critics alleged that many of these were granted in exchange for greyhounds and gin, but a good deal of money changed hands, much of it finding its way into the pockets of corrupt white advisers, including the egregious and venal Theophilus ‘Offy’ Shepstone, the eldest son of Sir Theophilus Shepstone.

These concessions were to be the subject of endless litigation and several commissions of inquiry over the ensuing twenty years. They had the effect of involving the governments of Great Britain and the South African Republic (the Transvaal) in the affairs of Swaziland in support of the competing claims of their citizens. The complex and long-running nature of the litigation that they engendered played a part in ensuring that Swaziland avoided complete incorporation into the South African Republic before 1899, the British colony of the Transvaal after 1902, or the Union of South Africa in 1910.

== Early regency ==
After the selection of her eldest son, Bhunu, as the successor to his father in 1889, Labotsibeni became the Ndlovukati or Queen mother. There is little doubt that in choosing Bhunu as the heir to his father the old queen mother, Tibati, and the members of the inner council were influenced by their knowledge of his mother's strength of character. It is said that King Mbandzeni had himself recommended her to be the mother of his heir. In the early years of Bhunu's minority Labotsibeni had to take second place to Tibati, who served as queen regent. While Tibati remained at the royal homestead of Nkanini, Labotsibeni established a new headquarters for her son a few kilometres away at Zombodze. There was some tension between the two rulers, which lasted until Tibati's death in October 1895, but by 1894 Labotsibeni had emerged as the stronger of the two. She played a leading role in opposition to the third Swaziland convention of 1894, which provided for the establishment, in February 1895, of a Transvaal protectorate over Swaziland.This replaced the tripartite system of administration involving Great Britain, the Transvaal, and the Swazi nation, that had been set up in 1890. It also represented a concession by the British to the claims of the Transvaal over Swaziland, though they were not prepared to allow Swaziland's incorporation into the Transvaal. It was at this time that Labotsibeni emerged as a remarkably intelligent, articulate, and astute spokesperson for the Swazi nation; she dominated the debate at indabas, and got the better of the argument at meetings with such representatives of the Transvaal as the vice-president, N. J. Smit, and the commandant-general, Piet Joubert, as well as with the republic's special commissioner in Swaziland, J. C. Krogh, and successive British consuls in Swaziland, James Stuart and Johannes Smuts.

Although Bhunu had been installed as ngwenyama or king, with the title Ngwane V, in February 1895, Labotsibeni retained considerable authority. As queen mother she was, in terms of the unwritten constitution of the country, a dual monarch with political influence equal to that of the king, and with the supernatural power to make rain. Her position was strengthened by the reckless behaviour of Bhunu, who established his own base at Mampondweni in the Mdzimba mountains above Zombodze. When he was implicated in the murder of Labotsibeni's senior induna, Mbhabha Nsibandze, and two other indunas, at Zombodze in April 1898, the Transvaal administration sought to bring him to trial. Accompanied by his brother, Malunge, he fled across the border into the British colony of Natal. He was saved from deposition by the intervention of the British high commissioner in South Africa, Lord Milner, who held that the Transvaal's attempt to try him was ultra vires. He returned to Swaziland under British protection and a commission of inquiry imposed a fine on him, holding that he had allowed disorderly behaviour within his kingdom. Britain and the Transvaal then combined to add a protocol to the Swaziland convention that purported to reduce his status from king to paramount chief, and removed his powers of criminal jurisdiction.

On the outbreak of the South African War in October 1899 the Transvaal's special commissioner, J. C. Krogh, and the British consul, Johannes Smuts, withdrew from Swaziland. General Piet Joubert wrote to Bhunu, indicating that the South African Republic was leaving Swaziland in his hands. He resumed full authority over his kingdom, but he did not live long to enjoy untrammelled power: he died two months later at Zombodze on 10 December. Labotsibeni now became queen regent as well as queen mother and acted in the name of Bhunu's son, Mona, also known as Nkhotfotjeni, who was chosen to succeed at the age of six months; he eventually became paramount chief, and later King Sobhuza II. It was widely believed that Labotsibeni would have preferred her second son, Prince Malunge, a handsome, intelligent, eloquent, and able young man, to succeed Bhunu. His succession would have avoided a very long minority, but it would have been an unacceptable break with Swazi custom.

For most of the three-year crisis of the South African War, Labotsibeni was, with the support of a co-regent, Prince Logcogco (a son of King Mswati II), and her council, the last independent ruler in Africa south of the Zambezi. During this period she adopted the habitual stance of a Swazi monarch. While leaning towards the British, she sought to preserve Swaziland as a neutral space and maintained a diplomatic relationship with the South African Republic's forces. She was largely successful in keeping Swaziland out of the war. Exceptional incidents were Thinthitha Dlamini's attack on a party from the Piet Retief commando near Hlatikhulu in February 1901, and General Tobias Smuts's attack on a small unit of the British irregular force Steinacker's Horse at Bremersdorp in July 1901. Labotsibeni had apparently called in the Boers to remove this troublesome group of freebooters and to release Prince Mancibane, a member of the royal family whom the British had detained on suspicion of spying, but she regretted the Boers' destruction of the small town.

As the war came to an end, Labotsibeni and the Swazi council hoped for the establishment of a British protectorate. They were disappointed by Lord Milner's initial decision that Swaziland should be administered through the Transvaal. Labotsibeni and her council protested strongly against the terms of the Swaziland order in council of 1903 and the Swaziland administration proclamation of 1904, which set up the machinery of government under a resident commissioner. Prince Malunge led a Swazi deputation to meet Milner's successor as high commissioner, Lord Selborne, in Pretoria in 1905, to protest over these and other issues, and Selborne himself paid a visit to Swaziland in September 1906. On that occasion he announced that the administration of Swaziland would, in view of the imminent restoration of self-government to the Transvaal, be transferred to the high commissioner. As a result of Labotsibeni's pressure, the threat posed by the recent Zulu uprising, and the still unresolved issue of the land concessions, Swaziland thus became a high commission territory like Bechuanaland and Basutoland, though it was never formally declared to be a British protectorate.

== Regency under Britain ==
Labotsibeni and her council also protested vigorously against the terms of the land partition, which was proclaimed in 1907, and subsequently carried out by George Grey, brother of the Liberal cabinet minister Sir Edward Grey. This divided Swaziland between the Swazi nation, the white concessionaires, and the British crown. Robert Coryndon, who was brought in from north-western Rhodesia as resident commissioner in that year, sought to take a hard line with Labotsibeni, Malunge, and those whom he described as ‘the Zombodze faction’. He was not, however, able to get support from his superiors for a plan to depose Labotsibeni and replace her by Mona, the infant heir. After a year in office Coryndon described Labotsibeni as ‘a woman of extraordinary diplomatic ability and strength of character, an experienced and capable opposition with which it [the administration] was for some time incapable of dealing’ (Jones, 402). Prince Malunge was the effective leader of a Swazi deputation to London, which met the colonial secretary, Lord Elgin, in February 1908. They got little or no redress on the land issue, apart from a disputed, and subsequently dishonoured, promise that they would be able to buy back the crown land. Three years after the return of the deputation, Labotsibeni and Malunge became, with the consent of Coryndon, the prime movers behind a national fund to buy back land—a move that seems to have drawn a little of the bitterness from the issue.

The establishment of the Union of South Africa in 1910, and the provision in the schedule attached to the act for the future incorporation of Swaziland and the other high commission territories in the union, prompted Labotsibeni and Malunge to take a greater interest than they had done previously in the affairs of South Africa, where they had many subjects. Labotsibeni was reported in 1914 as saying that ‘as Swaziland would no doubt enter the Union at some future date she was in sympathy with any efforts tending towards the betterment of the conditions under which Union natives live, and for this reason her son Malunge had become a member of the Native Congress’ (Macmillan, 294–5). Prince Malunge attended the conference that was held by the South African Natives National Congress in Kimberley in February 1914 to discuss the response to the Land Act, and was treated as the most distinguished delegate. He and Labotsibeni were close to two of the prime movers in the founding of the congress, the lawyers Pixley Seme and Richard Msimang, and provided the bulk of the funds, about £3000, which were required for the establishment in 1912 of its official newspaper, Abantu-Batho, whose first editor, Cleopas Kunene, had been secretary and interpreter to Labotsibeni. Malunge's sudden death in January 1915 was a great blow to his mother and the Swazi nation, and was seen as a loss to the black people of South Africa as a whole.

Labotsibeni's last major contribution as queen regent was her insistence, in spite of some opposition, that Mona, the heir to the throne, should receive the best education then available to a black person in southern Africa. After primary education at the Swazi National School at Zombodze he was sent in 1916 to Lovedale, a school run by the United Free Church of Scotland at Alice in the Cape, which he attended for three years. In 1919 she decided that he should be withdrawn from school and prepared for his installation as king. She transferred authority to him in the presence of the resident commissioner, de Symons Montagu Honey, at a ceremony on 22 December 1921. In a moving address, which was read and translated on her behalf by her secretary, Josiah Vilakazi, she said:

This is the day that I have always longed for. It has now come at last like a dream which has come true. King Mbandzeni died in October 1889 … As from that day my life has been burdened by an awful responsibility and anxiety. It has been a life full of the deepest emotions that a woman has ever had.

— Labotsibeni Mdluli, (Kuper, 73)

== Later life ==
Labotsibeni died after a long illness at Zombodze on 15 December 1925 and was buried there. In an obituary The Times noted that she had for two generations been ‘the best known native woman in South Africa’. T. D. Mweli Skota's African Yearly Register noted that ‘she was a wonderful woman; a good, wise and tactful ruler, and acknowledged by all the representatives of the British Throne as one of the cleverest rulers in Africa’ (Skota, 77).

Today, eSwatini is also affectionately referred to as kaGogo eSwatini in her honor, with Gogo meaning ‘grandmother’ in Siswati, a reference to Labotsibeni’s enduring legacy and her role as a respected national matriarch.

Regnal titles
Preceded by King Ngwane V of Swaziland	Queen Regent of Swaziland; 1899–1921	Succeeded by King Sobhuza II of Swaziland
