= Matsafeni Mdluli =

19th century Swazi warrior

- Born: Hhohho, Swaziland (now Eswatini)
- Died: c.1892 Nelspruit, South Africa
- Resting place: Kruger National Park
- Occupations: Swazi clan leader; Regiment commander
- Years active: 1840s to 1890s
- Known for: Founder of the Mdluli settlement in present-day Matsafeni (Mbombela); Leader of the Hhohho regiment
- Father: Nyeti Mdluli

Matsafeni Mdluli (also spelt Mataffin) was a 19th century Swazi chief and warrior who led Swazi military campaigns in the area around present-day Mbombela (formerly Nelspruit) and west of Limpopo, South Africa during the Swazi-Sotho conflicts. He was a military leader for one of the regiments of King Mswati II and later his son King Mbandzeni, called Hhohho.

Matsafeni belonged to the Eswatini aristocratic Mdluli clan that serves as custodian of the Mbilaneni Royal Burial Site and a clan from which the mother of King Bhunu, Queen Labotsibeni Mdluli, was born in Hhohho in c.1858. The Matsafeni settlement on the banks of the Crocodile River near the Mbombela Stadium in South Africa is associated with his military influence and Eswatini's expansionist conquest starting in the mid-1800s. This is where he lived with his 40 wives.

== Military and political role ==
Matsafeni Mdluli served as governor of Hhohho under King Mswati II and as the leader of Mswati's Hhohho regiment. He moved to the Nelspruit area in the 1840s as part of Mswati's trusted warriors and led military campaigns against Sotho-speaking people, establishing himself as the leader of the Swazi expedition in the Nelspruit-Lydenburg region.

By 1866, Matsafeni had led major Swazi raids across the Lowveld, crossing the Great Letaba River and attacking several communities towards Phalaborwa, including the Lobedu under Queen Madjadji and other groups along the escarpment such as the Nkuna under Chief Shiluvane for King Mswati II.

In 1869, he fought in the Battle of Ewulu, a battle that began just after King Mswati II's death in 1868 with Sotho people and at which Swazi forces suffered significant losses. Matsafeni was reportedly blamed by Queen regent Tsandzile Ndwandwe for leading the military campaign while the Kingdom was still mourning the death of King Mswati II.

In the mid-1870s, Matsafeni supported Bapedi forces during clashes with Boer settlers, clashes that formed part of years of instability in the eastern Transvaal preceding the Sekhukhune War and the British annexation of the Transvaal in 1877. Swazi forces under him also participated in large scale raids in the Lydenburg and Blyde River areas.

During the 1880s, Matsafeni as a clan chief was engaged in taxation disputes and territorial delimitation with the South African Republic near the Komati River and Crocodile River.

== Death ==
In c.1892, Matsafeni entered into a dispute with Native Commissioner Abel Erasmus and left the area but was killed and buried next to Imagaroti Creek, south of Ship Mountain (Mhukweni) in the Kruger National Park.
