= Henning Fode =

Danish civil servant

Henning Fode (born 28 January 1948) is a Danish civil servant who served as the Private Secretary and Chamberlain to Margrethe II of Denmark from 2008 until her abdication in 2024.

Prior to his appointment, Henning Fode served in a number of positions in the Danish government. His last posting was as Director of Public Prosecutions and earlier he was Director General of the Danish Security Intelligence Service.

Following the abdication of the Queen, he resigned as Private Secretary and Chamberlain.

== Honours ==
- Grand Cross of the Order of the Falcon (24 January 2017)
- Knight Grand Cross of the Order of Isabella the Catholic (24 October 2023)
