= Lomawa Ndwandwe =

laNgolotsheni (Lomawa) Ndwandwe

Ndlovukati of Swaziland
- Reign: 1921–1938
- Predecessor: Labotsibeni Mdluli
- Successor: Nukwase Ndwandwe
- King: Sobhuza II
- Born: c. 1860/1875
- Died: September 1938
- Spouse: Ngwenyama Bhunu
- Issue: Nkhotfotjeni
- Father: Chief Ngolotjeni Nxumalo
- Mother: Msindvose Ndlela

laNgolotsheni (Lomawa) Ndwandwe (died September 1938) was the Ndlovukati (queen mother) of Swaziland, the wife of King Ngwane V, and the mother of King Sobhuza II.

== Biography ==
=== Early life ===
Ndwandwe, of the Esikoteni branch of the Ndwandwe clan, was born to Chief Ngolotjeni Nxumalo and Msindvose Ndlela. She was the eldest of three sisters. Her siblings included her full sister (and ultimately, co-wife) Nukwase Ndwandwe, who succeeded her as Ndlovukati, and her brother Benjamin Nxumalo, who later provided counsel to Sobhuza II.

As a descendant of La Zidze and as the daughter of a respected chief, Ndwandwe was selected by the council of elders as the main wife for Ngwane V.

=== Reign ===
Following the death of Ngwane V, Ndwandwe was selected from among his widows, by the council of elders, as the next Ndlovukati, and her infant son Nkhotfotjeni was named King Sobhuza II.

As the Queen Mother, Ndwandwe was the guardian of Swazi rituals.

=== Death ===
Ndwandwe died in September 1938. In order to avoid weakening King Sobhuza II via association with death, the King was prevented by the council of elders from attending his mother's funeral. Ndwandwe was buried with her church membership cards, at the insistence of her sister, Nukwase Ndwandwe.

== Religious views ==
Ndwandwe was not baptized, in deference to the wishes of Labotsibeni Mdluli. Nevertheless, Ndwandwe became a recognised supporter of the Methodist church. She was also sympathetic to a nearby Zionist Separatist church whose local leader espoused political views that overlapped strongly with her own.

The question of which denomination Ndwandwe identified with was, in any case, not of significance to Sobhuza II, who was critical of divisions between sects.
