= Zihlathi Ndwandwe/Mkhatjwa =

Zihlathi Ndwandwe/Mkhatshwa

Ndlovukati of Swaziland
- Reign: 1957–1975
- Predecessor: Nukwase Ndwandwe
- Successor: Seneleleni Ndwandwe
- King: Sobhuza II
- Died: 1975

Zihlathi Ndwandwe (died 1975), also known as Zilathi Nxumalo, was Ndlovukati (queen mother) of Swaziland during the reign of Sobhuza II. She was succeeded by her full sister and co-wife, Seneleni Ndwandwe.
