= Sobhuza II =

King of Swaziland from 1899 to 1982

- Ngwenyama
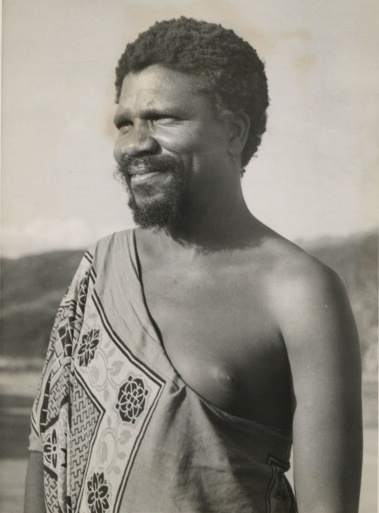
- Sobhuza in 1945

King of Swaziland
- Reign: 10 December 1899 – 21 August 1982
- Coronation: 22 December 1921
- Predecessor: Bhunu
- Successor: Mswati III
- Queen Mother: See list: Labotsibeni Mdluli (until 1921); Lomawa Ndwandwe (1921–1938); Nukwase Ndwandwe (1938–1957); Zihlathi Ndwandwe/Mkhatjwa (1957–1975); Seneleleni Ndwandwe (1975–1980); Dzeliwe Shongwe (since 1980)
- Born: Nkhotfotjeni Dlamini; 22 July 1899; Zombodze, Swaziland
- Died: 21 August 1982 (aged 83); Mbabane, Swaziland
- Burial: Mbilaneni
- Spouse: 70 wives, including Dzeliwe Shongwe and Ntfombi Tfwala
- Issue: 210 children, including Mswati III
- House: House of Dlamini
- Father: Bhunu
- Mother: Lomawa Ndwandwe

Sobhuza II KBE (Swazi: [sɔbʱuzʱa]; also known as Nkhotfotjeni, Mona; 22 July 1899 – 21 August 1982) was Ngwenyama (King) of Swaziland (now Eswatini) for 82 years and 254 days, the longest verifiable reign of any monarch in recorded history.

Sobhuza was born on 22 July 1899 at Zombodze Royal Residence, the son of Inkhosikati Lomawa Ndwandwe and King Bhunu. When he was only four months old, his father died suddenly while dancing incwala. Sobhuza was chosen king soon after that and his grandmother Labotsibeni and his great-uncle Prince Malunge, a son of Mbandzeni, led the Swazi nation until his maturity in 1921. Sobhuza was acknowledged as King by the British in 1967, and Swaziland achieved independence in 1968. Sobhuza continued to reign until his death in 1982. He was succeeded by Mswati III, his young son with Inkhosikati Ntfombi Tfwala, who was crowned in 1986.

== Early life and education ==
Ingwenyama Sobhuza was born in Zombodze on 22 July 1899. He ascended to the throne after the death of his father, Ngwane V, as King of Swaziland on 10 December 1899, when he was only four months old. He was educated at Zombodze Primary School, Swazi National School and at the Lovedale Institution in the Eastern Cape, South Africa, before assuming the Swazi throne as King at the age of twenty-two. His grandmother, Labotsibeni Mdluli, served as regent throughout his youth, formally transferring power to the Ngwenyama on 22 December 1921. Before assuming his royal duties, he studied anthropology in England.

== Kingship ==
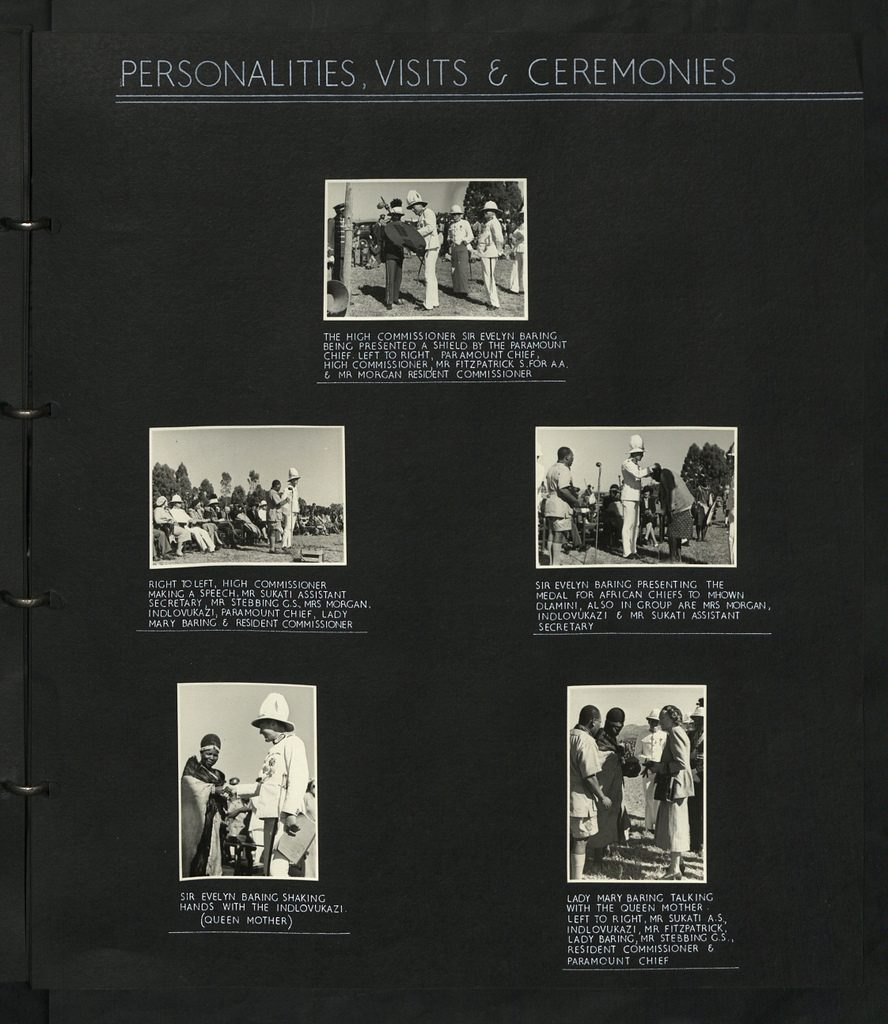
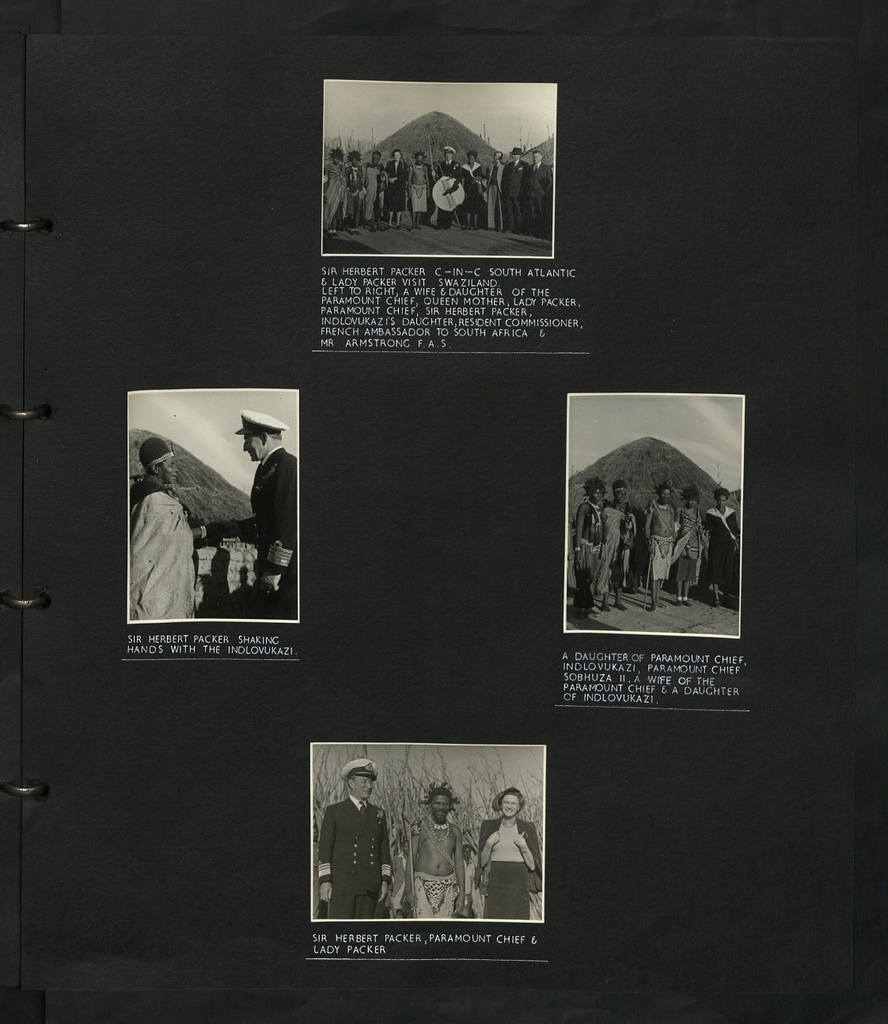
The National Archives pictures of the Swazi royal family

Sobhuza's direct reign would endure more than 60 years (1921–1982), during which he presided over Swaziland's independence from the United Kingdom in 1968, after which the British government recognised him as King of Swaziland (Eswatini). Early in his reign, Sobhuza sought to address the problem of land that had been occupied by white settlers in 1907. He did so by first leading a delegation to London to meet with King George V and petition him to restore the lands to the Swazi people. He again took his case on the land issue in 1929 to the Judicial Committee of the Privy Council. He was defeated by the terms of the Foreign Jurisdictions Act 1890, which effectively placed the actions of British administrations in protectorates beyond the reach of the British courts. Sobhuza's role during this colonial period was for the most part ceremonial, but he still had major influence as a traditional head of the Swazi nation. In 1934, he received the anthropologist Bronislaw Malinowski. In 1953, he attended the coronation of Queen Elizabeth II in London.

In the early 1960s Sobhuza played a major role in events that led to independence for his country in 1968. He opposed the post-colonial Westminster constitution proposed by the British government, in which he was assigned the role of constitutional monarch. As a consequence, acting through his advisory council, he formed the Imbokodvo National Movement, a political party, which contested and won all seats in the 1967 pre-independence elections. He became recognized by the British as King of Swaziland in 1967 when Swaziland was given direct rule. Independence was achieved on 6 September 1968. Following this, Sobhuza skilfully blended appeal to tribal custom with a capacity to manage economic and social change for his kingdom. On 12 April 1973, the king repealed the constitution and dissolved parliament, henceforth exercising power as an absolute ruler. In 1978 a new constitution was promulgated which provided for an elaborate reversion to a tribal mode of rule involving an electoral college of eighty members chosen by forty local councils known as tinkhundla, dominated by tribal elements. The Swazi economy prospered under Sobhuza's leadership. Swaziland is rich in natural resources, and much of the land and mineral wealth originally owned by non-Swazi interests was brought under indigenous control during Sobhuza's reign.

== Later life and death ==
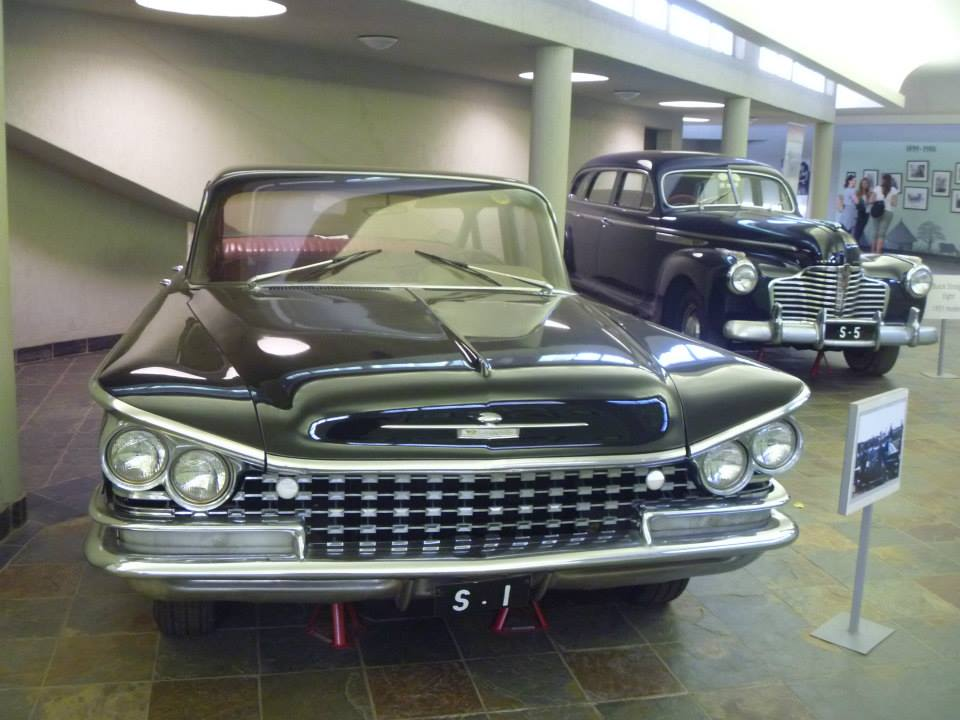
1959 Buick LeSabre, owned by Sobhuza II. Photographed at the Sobhuza II Memorial Park in Lobamba.

Sobhuza celebrated his Diamond Jubilee in 1981. At this time, he had successfully restored and indeed strengthened the monarch's role as the chief arbiter of decision-making in his kingdom. In the early 1980s King Sobhuza attempted to acquire control over KaNgwane, a Bantustan set up by the South African government in an attempt to reunite all Swazi people separated by the colonial boundary. He died on 21 August 1982 at Embo State house at the age of 83.

Sobhuza's official incumbency of 82 years and 254 days is the longest precisely dated monarchical reign on record and the world's longest documented reign of any sovereign since antiquity. Only Min Hti of the Burmese Kingdom of Arakan, Pepi II Neferkare of Ancient Egypt and Taejo of the ancient Korean kingdom of Goguryeo are claimed to have reigned longer, though these claims are disputed.

== Family and succession ==
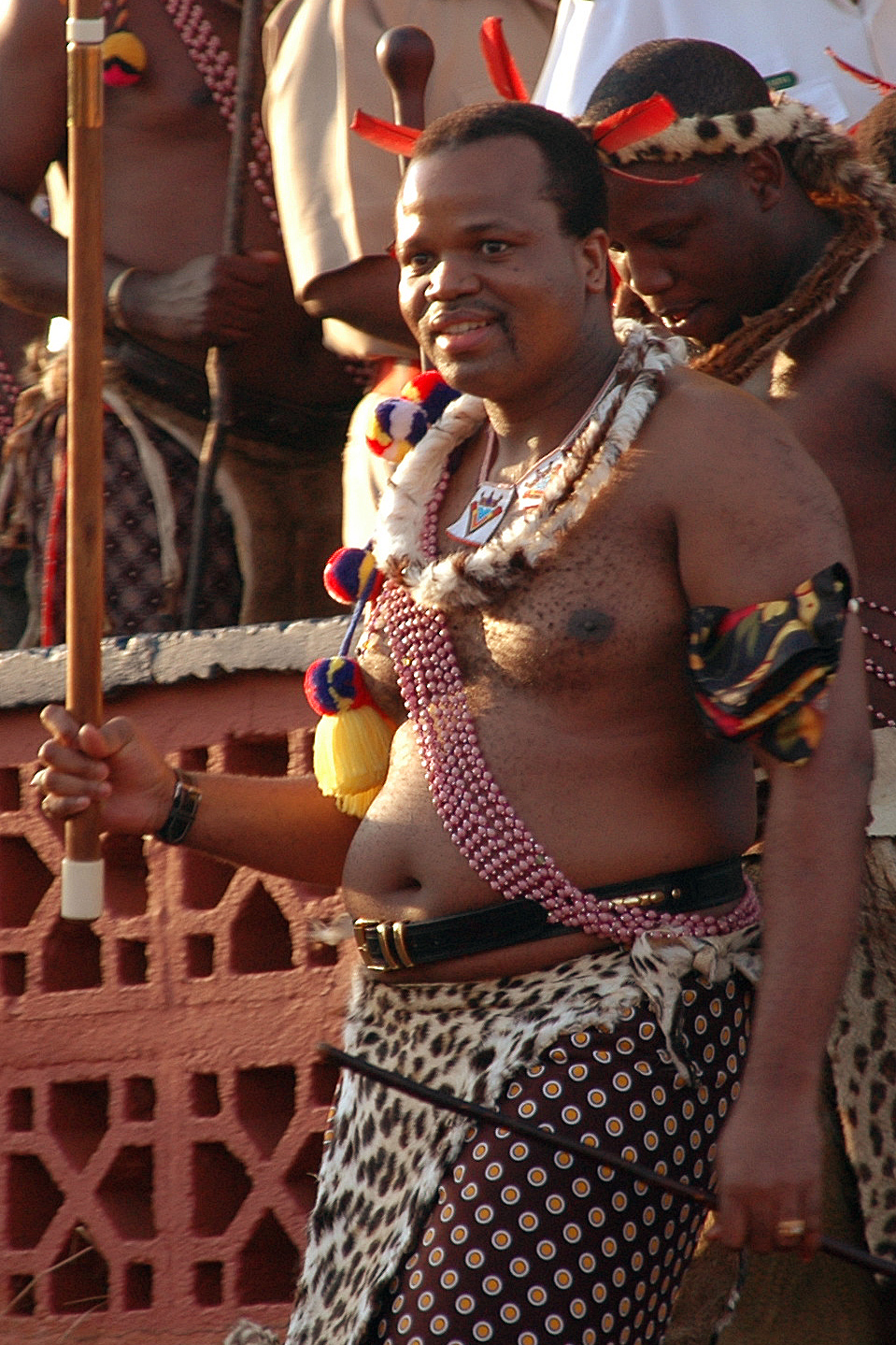
Mswati III, Sobhuza II's son and eventual successor

Known by the honorific "Bull of the Swazi" by virtue of his numerous progeny, King Sobhuza continued the tribal practice of maintaining many consorts, including his favorite, Pauline Fikelephi Masuku. According to the Swaziland National Trust Commission, King Sobhuza II had 70 wives, who gave him 210 children between 1920 and 1970. About 180 children survived infancy, and 97 sons and daughters were reported living as of 2000. At his death he had more than 1,000 grandchildren.

Sobhuza died in 1982, having appointed Prince Sozisa Dlamini to serve as 'Authorized Person', advising a regent. Selection of a successor was confirmed only after King Sobhuza's death, a regent being necessary if the heir remained under age at that time. By tradition, the regent would be one of the queens consort who had borne the late king a son. The first regent was Queen Dzeliwe, but after a power struggle Sozisa deposed her and she was replaced by Queen Ntfombi. Ntombi reigned on behalf of her young son by King Sobhuza, Prince Makhosetive Dlamini, who was designated as Crown Prince or Umntfwana. He was crowned King Mswati III in 1986.

King Sobhuza II Memorial Park

One of Sobhuza's sons-in-law was the late Goodwill Zwelithini kaBhekuzulu, King of the Zulus of South Africa, who married the Swazi king's daughter, Princess Mantfombi (born at Siteki in 1956, betrothed in 1973), at Nongoma in June 1977. Another in-law is Zenani Mandela, the daughter of former South African President Nelson Mandela, who belonged to a cadet branch of the Thembu dynasty which reigns as paramount chiefs in the Transkei. She wed Sobhuza's son, Prince Thumbumuzi Dlamini, who, although an older half-brother of Mswati and Mantfombi, did not inherit the Swazi throne, instead launching, with his wife, an enterprise in the United States.

== Honours ==
=== National honours ===
- Grand Master of the Royal Order of the King Sobhuza II (Kingdom of Swaziland, 1975).

=== Foreign honours ===

Honorary Knight Commander of the Order of the British Empire, Civil Division (KBE) (United Kingdom, 1 January 1966).

Honorary Commander of the Order of the British Empire, Civil Division (CBE) (United Kingdom, 8 June 1950.)

Honorary Officer of the Order of the British Empire, Civil Division (OBE) (United Kingdom, 11 May 1937).

- Supreme Companion of the Order of the Companions of O. R. Tambo [posthumous] (Republic of South Africa, 20 April 2006).

== See also ==
- Politics of Eswatini
- List of people with the most children

Regnal titles
Preceded by Labotsibeni Mdluli (Queen Regent)	King of Swaziland; 1899–1982	Succeeded by Dzeliwe Shongwe (Queen Regent)
