= Pauline Fikelephi Masuku =

Swaziland royal wife (1927–2012)

- Born: October 11, 1927
- Died: March 10, 2012
- Spouse: Sobhuza II

Pauline Fikelephi Masuku (October 11, 1927 – March 10, 2012), popularly known by her sibongo (clan name) LaMasuku, was the favorite Inkhosikati (royal wife) of King Sobuza II of Swaziland.

Pauline Fikelephi Masuku was born on October 11, 1927, the second child of farmers Elias Masuku and Linah Sihlongonyane. She attended the Swazi National High School in Matsapha, where one of her classmates was Princess Pholile, daughter of Sobuza. Sobuza saw Masuku singing at a school concert there and courted her, wishing her to become one of his wives. However, her parents were members of a conservative Protestant denomination, the South Africa General Mission (SAGM), and were aghast at the idea of their daughter marrying a "heathen" polygamist. She fled to South Africa, where she studied nursing at King Edward Hospital in Durban and Baragwanath Hospital in Johannesburg.

Sobuza continued his pursuit of her, through letters and using Pholile as an intermediary. She returned to Swaziland and they married in 1949. It was a difficult adjustment for a woman raised in a strict Protestant household and she drew the ire of a number of the king's jealous other wives.

In the 1970s, Masuku pushed for the construction of several schools: the Phocweni Primary School at Masundvwini and the Dlal'sile Primary School at Hlane. She was the first royal to join the Seventh Day Adventist Church, inspiring other people in Swaziland to join as well.

Pauline Fikelephi Masuku died on 10 March 2012.

== Family ==
Masuku had four children by Sobuza:

- Prince Phikanebenkhosi (b. May 4, 1950)
- Princess Dlal'sile (b. 1956)
- Princess Msindvose (b. 1960)
- Princess Nqobile (b. 1962).
