= Queen Mother of Eswatini =

Title of the female monarch of Eswatini

- Ndlovukati
- Arms of Her Majesty the Queen Mother of Eswatini

Incumbent
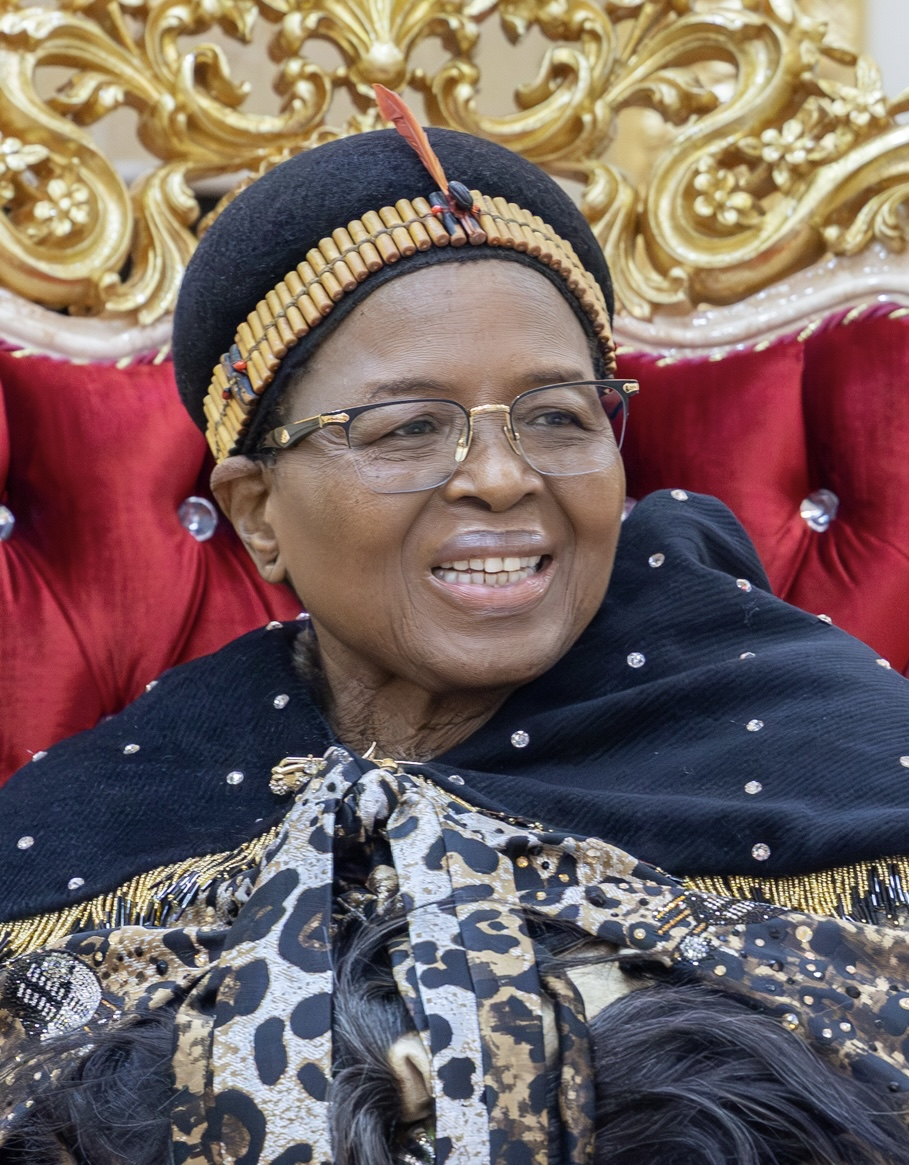
- Ntfombi since 10 August 1983

Details
- Style: Her Majesty
- First monarch: LaYaka Ndwandwe
- Formed: 1745; 281 years ago
- Residences: Ludzidzini Royal Village, Lobamba

Queen Mother of Eswatini, officially Ndlovukati (lit. 'She-Elephant', pl. tiNdlovukati; also spelled Indlovukazi), is the title of the female monarch of Eswatini. The title is given preferentially to the mother of the reigning king (styled the Ngwenyama, "Lion of Swaziland"), or to another female royal of high status if the king's mother has died. The Ndlovukati serves as a joint head of state, ruling alongside the Ngwenyama. When there is no king, the Ndlovukati rules as queen regent. The current Ndlovukati is Queen Ntfombi Tfwala, the mother of Ngwenyama Mswati III and a wife of Sobhuza II. She was also queen regent from 1983 until 1986 when Mswati became king. The most notable queen regent was Ndlovukati Labotsibeni Mdluli who ruled Swaziland from 1899 until 1921 when she abdicated for Sobhuza II.

== Origins ==
The Queen Mother is traditionally joint monarch of Eswatini with the King. The king is seen as the administrative head of state, while the Ndlovukati is seen as the spiritual and national head of state. During the reign of Sobhuza II the title became more ceremonial. Several of the Ndlovukati's functions are to control important ritual substances (sometimes called medicines) and knowledge necessary for inaugurating of the rule of a Ngwenyama, rainmaking, and the annual renewal of national and kingly strength in the incwala rites. The Ndlovukati also leads the nation as queen regent following a king's death and during the youth of the crown prince. Other notable Tindlovukati are Tsandzile Ndwandwe, Lojiba Simelane, Tibati Nkambule, and Labotsibeni Mdluli from nineteenth century Swaziland.

== History ==
Historically, there have been a number of Ndlovukati with great substantial power as well as influence, especially (though not exclusively) in periods of regency. The power of the Ndlovukati was explicitly understood as a counterweight to that of the Ngwenyama and also to potentially rival royal princes. This was the case especially during the reign of Mswati II and Tsandzile Ndwandwe. Like royal governors who were not from the royal House of Dlamini, the Ndlovukati could not accede to the throne, thus offering an alternative source of power to rein in overweening Tingwenyama who could not challenge directly to be the Ngwenyama.

During the long reign of Sobhuza II (1899–1982), his grandmother Ndlovukati Labotsibeni Mdluli (also known as "Gwamile") was the last great bearer of the title, being the primary Swazi political power from Sobhuza's accession as an infant in 1899 until his accession to full power in 1922. However, over the following 60 years the practical power and influence of the office of ndlovukati became greatly overshadowed, in part because the British chose to recognize the powers of the king (whom they called the "Paramount Chief") over those of the senior, in part because of the force of Sobhuza's personality in contrast to the tindlovukati who succeeded his own mother after she died in 1938, and in part because of conservative aristocratic Swazi male reactions to colonialism, which created a new and more rigid form of patriarchy now called and argued by some to be mischaracterised as "traditional". The office of Ndlovukati suffered a further blow after the death of Sobhuza II, when a holder of the office was implicated in the political machinations of Prince Mfanasibili aimed at usurping the kingship. Thus the political-cultural ideals and historical meanings of the office expressed above do not really characterise the Ndlovukati today, whose position has become much weaker than that of the Ngwenyama.

At any time where there is both an Ingwenyama and a Ndlovukati, which is most of the time, there are two royal villages. Even during a regency when the king is a minor, a proto-form of his headquarters is prepared. The King's headquarters is where he carries out his administrative duties; the Ndlovukati's, which is called umphakatsi, (meaning "the inside," and a term also applied to the royal insiders and close allies as a group) is the national capital and spiritual and ceremonial home of the nation. The king resides at his own royal village or kraal called lilawu. The present umphakatsi is at Ludzidzini Royal Kraal and lilawu is at Ngabezweni Royal Kraal.

== List of tiNdlovukati ==
No.	Portrait	Name	Reign	Regency
1		LaYaka Ndwandwe	1745–1780	1780
2		Lomvula Mndzebele	1780–1815	1815
3		Lojiba Simelane	1815–1840	1836–1840
4		Tsandzile Ndwandwe (LaZidze)	1840–1875	1868–1875
5		Sisile Khumalo (Lamgangeni)	1875–1881	
6		Tibati Nkambule (Madvolomafisha)	1881–1895	1889–1895
7		Labotsibeni Mdluli (Gwamile, Lamvelase)	1895–1921	1899–1921
8		Lomawa Ndwandwe	1921–1938	
9		Nukwase Ndwandwe	1938–1957	
10		Zihlathi Ndwandwe/Mkhatjwa	1957–1975	
11		Seneleleni Ndwandwe	1975–1980	
12		Dzeliwe Shongwe	1980–1983	1982–1983
13		Ntfombi Tfwala	1983–present	1983–1986

== Royal standard ==
Standard of the Queen Mother
