= Incwala =

Main ritual of kingship in Eswatini

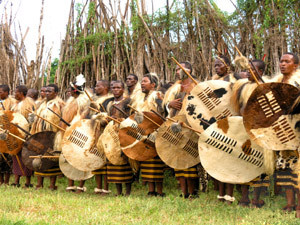
Swazi warriors dancing incwala

Incwala (Swazi: [iᵑǀwala]) is the main ritual of kingship in the Kingdom of Eswatini. This is a national event that takes place during the summer solstice. The main participant in incwala is the King of Eswatini; when there is no king there is no incwala. Incwala takes place over a period of time of about a month, starting with the small incwala, incwala lencane, and culminating in the big incwala, incwala lenkhulu. A number of activities - such as lusekwane, kuhlamahlama, and umdvutjulwa - mark the key events of this age old tradition. Unlike Ummemo which is convened by local chiefs, Incwala and Umhlanga are national events and are convened under the authority of the King and the Queen Mother.

== Main participants ==
The incwala ritual is controlled by national priests known as Bemanti (people of the water), or Belwandle (people of the sea), because they fetch river- and sea-water to strengthen the King. The leader of these men is a chief of the Ndwandwe clan who is assisted by other male relatives. Another leader is of the Ndwandwe clan from the Elwandle royal village. These men go and fetch water and herbs respectively in the nation's rivers and the sea.

The other important individuals are tinsila (artificial blood-brothers of the king), and especially the left-hand insila, who shadow the King throughout the performance. On the other hand, the princes and hereditary chiefs who do not belong to the royal (Dlamini) clan are never in close contact with him. The princes should, however, be present, but they cannot enter the sanctuary at the crucial moment of the ritual. Certain chiefs, other than Dlamini, may not attend the incwala for they are so powerful that their personality might fight that of the King and injure him. By their exclusion they accept the supremacy of the Dlamini, and show their relative independence in their own local ceremonies. Some of their subjects, however, must attend. Finally, the regiments, the rank and file of the nation play a major part in the public ceremonies and are quartered in barracks in the capital for the duration of the Incwala. The rank and file of the nation, the majority of the participants, arrive in local contingents led by their chief or his representative. They come to support kingship.

The duty of organizing the whole ceremony, seeing that it is held on the correct date, preparing the utensils, providing the requisite ingredients, and informing the nation devolves on the governors of the royal villages, and the mobilizing for each scene of the drama belongs to the regimental officials.

== Activities ==
=== Bemanti ===
In the earliest stage, the Bemanti set out with sacred vessels to the sea, a little south of Maputo in neighbouring Mozambique, and another group, to the rivers Lusutfu, Komanzi, and Mbuluzi. The departure is a festive occasion. When the Bemanti meet any Swazi on the journey they pillage (kuhlamahlama) the country-side and take any beer they find in the huts. The fines are very light: a pin, grass bracelet, small coin, or other trifle that has been in contact with the person can be offered. Any tendency to exact exorbitant fines, such as a new hat or jacket, is discouraged. If a man has no small object with him, he may later bring an exchange for the first offering. Wherever they go the Bemanti are treated with the utmost respect. At each home where they sleep a beast is killed and the tail tied round the vessel. To the Swazi who live in outlying districts, their visit is a sign that the Incwala is close at hand, and chiefs often give money and see that the Bemanti receive large bowls of beer since they are eager to help 'support the work of kings '.

=== Little Incwala ===
In this event, the Bemanti come to Ludzidzini, the Royal capital. The King and the Bemanti meet in the cattle byre. Special beer for them to seize has been brewed in the Queen Mother's enclosure and in the harem (sigodlo), and they carry it out to the leaders. The regiments present wear semi-Incwala dress, the graceful cloaks of cattle-tails hang from the shoulders to the waist, flowing tails are tied to the right arms, white feathers and magnificent black plumes shine in their hair, their loin coverings are of leopard skin. The costume resembles war dress, but at the Incwala men may only carry plain sticks (imizaca, umzaca singular) instead of spears and clubs (although these are occasionally concealed behind their shields). The restriction on dangerous weapons is to guard against the possibility that fighting might break out, since excitement runs high. The veterans slowly sing the first of the sacred songs known as the 'hand song." The women come through the upper entrance of the cattle byre to join in the singing and dancing. The wives of the King stand in order of seniority in the front row opposite the regiments. They flaunt new shawls and newly blackened skirts (tidziya plural). Behind them is the Indlovukazi, the Queen Mother with her retainers and the co-wives of the late King. The sacred songs of the Little Incwala are followed by a number of solemn songs known as imigubho, which are rich in historical allusions and moral precepts. Imigubho are also sung at other gatherings at the capital or homesteads of chiefs. The end is marked by the singing of incaba kancofula the national anthem of the Swazi. An interim period follows for about 15 days in different royal residences and imiphakatsi around the country where incwala songs are sung.

=== Lusekwane ===
The lusekwane marks the beginning of the big incwala. This is where young men fetch the lusekwane, the sacred tree. The lusekwane is a species of acacia that grows somewhat sparsely in a few areas in Eswatini and near the coast. It grows and is fetched from the same spot (the Egundvwini royal kraal near the Bulunga Mountains) and large quantities are chopped for the ceremony. Only pure youths may fetch the lusekwane. Indeed the Swazi say the tree was made expressly to distinguish the ' impure' from the 'pure'; a distinction that is drawn between men "who have spent their strength in children or have intrigued with married women and youths who, though they have had love affairs, have not made any woman pregnant". The sacred shrubs are used to build a sacred enclosure for the main event of the kingship. The lusekwane is cut, at night in the presence of the moon and brought back in the morning to the royal capital. After the return of the young warriors, they collect imbondvo, the leaves of a shrub that grows near the capital. The sacred enclosure (inhlambelo) is built with the lusekwane and the imbondvo at the bottom. This day is marked especially by the fighting of the bull called ‘’umdvutjulwa’’. The beast must be caught in the hands of the youths who fetched the sacred tree. Councillors drive it along with the other beasts to make it tractable, through the narrow doorway of the inhlambelo, and all the other animals come out after a few seconds. The 'pure' stand tense, ready to pounce as the umdvutshulwa emerges and pummel it with their strong young hands. To throw the bull with naked hands is a trial of strength and a test of purity.

=== Big Incwala ===
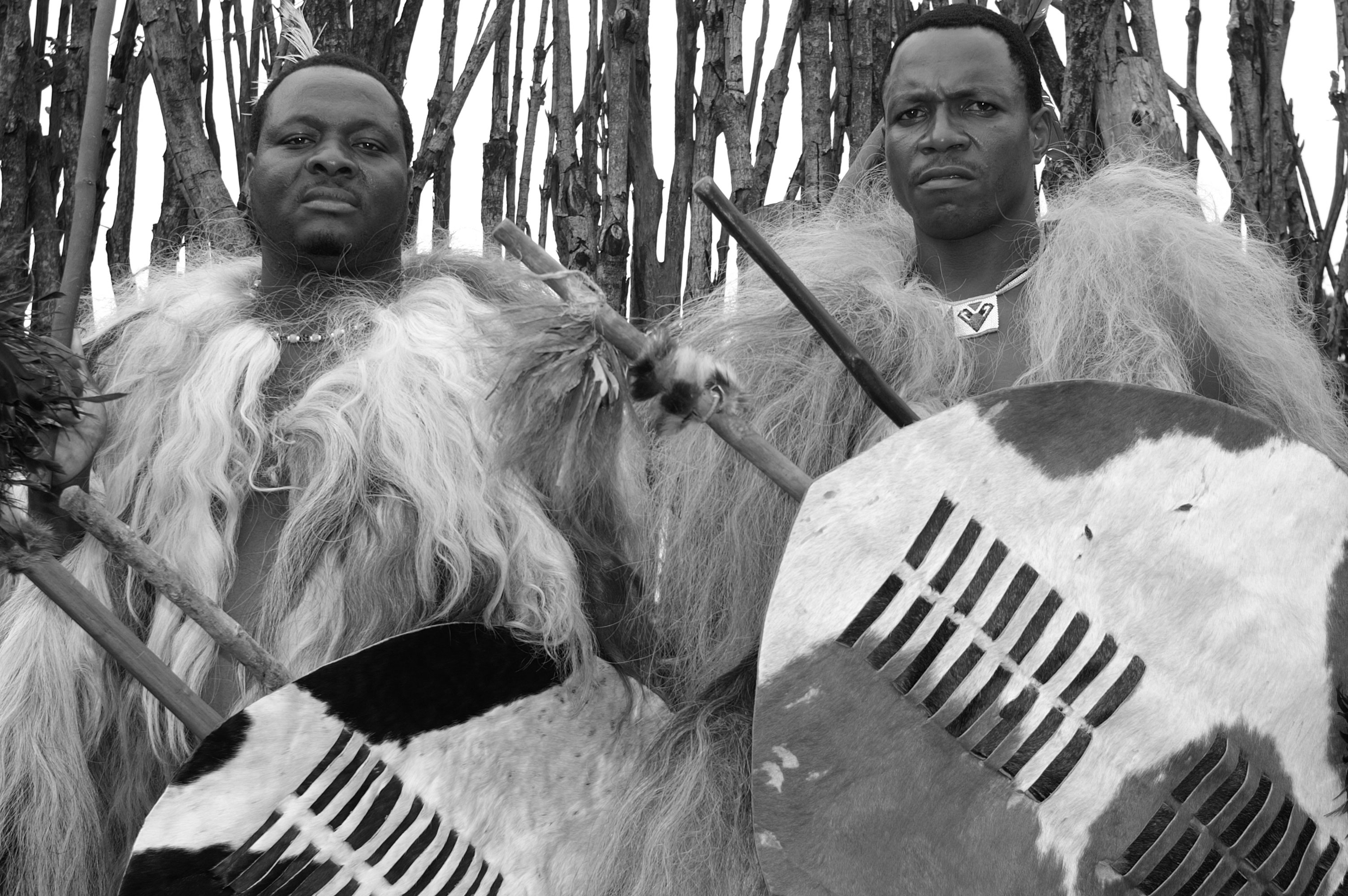
Warriors in full incwala dress

Following lusekwane, is the great day where the year-end is marked. On this day the King appears in all his splendor, and the ambivalent attitude of love and hate felt by his brothers and by his non-related subjects to him and to each other is dramatized. Only sacred incwala songs are sung on this day. Two songs are heard at once, the lullaby song of the boys as they drive the incwambo (parts of the umdvutjulwa) into the inhlambelo and a chant of hate from the men and women. By now he is sufficiently strong to bite (luma) the most powerful of the new seasons crops and after that his people can perform their own ' first fruits ' ritual. On this day he is Silo, a nameless creature, a monster of legends. The following day is a day of kubhacisa. There is a restriction on what people can do on this day, and the King remains secluded in the sacred enclosure. The regiments cannot shake hands, or engage in sexual activities. The King can only see the ritual wives. The final day of incwala is a day of purification where all material no longer needed is burnt. Among these are remains of the undvutjulwa, the previous year’s gourd (luselwa), utensils and fines collected by Bemanti during kuhlamahlama. Warriors and women enter the cattle byre and sing and dance only the imigubho as all incwala songs are now closed. As the people dance they 'know' that rain must fall to quench the flames. No matter how heavy the storm, the people do not seek shelter, till, drenched to the bone, they finally round off the performance with the incaba kancofula. The last day of the Incwala ends with feasting and revelry.

A last service remains to be performed for the rulers—the weeding of the fields. Early the next morning the warriors collect in the cattle byre, sing ordinary march songs, and leave for the Queen Mother's biggest maize garden. It usually takes a couple of days to weed them, and then the regiments slowly drift back to their districts. The permanent royal battalion moves over to the King's gardens and, having cleared them, usually works in the gardens of the queens. Throughout the country the local contingents serve their local chiefs, demonstrating in the order of their service the hierarchy of their society. And everywhere, before the people eat of their food, the conservative headmen collect the members of their homesteads and ritually partake of the crops of the new season; those chiefs who were sufficiently important not to attend the king's Incwala have a more elaborate rite than the commoners about them.

== Group cohesion ==
Incwala works as a way of creating group cohesion in Swazi society. King Sobhuza II wrote that warriors dance and sing at the Incwala and they feel they are one together, so they don't fight. This effect is known as "boundary loss", causing that the individual submerges in the flow.
