= Reigning Queens =

1985 series of portraits by Andy Warhol

- Artist: Andy Warhol
- Year: 1985
- Movement: Pop art

Reigning Queens is a 1985 portfolio of silkscreen prints by American artist Andy Warhol depicting the world's four reigning queens regnant at the time. The series consists of sixteen prints—four variations of each subject—portraying Queen Elizabeth II of the United Kingdom and the Commonwealth realms, Queen Beatrix of the Netherlands, Queen Margrethe II of Denmark, and Queen Ntfombi Twala of Swaziland. Based on official photographic portraits, Warhol reimagined the monarchs in his signature Pop art style, extending his exploration of celebrity, power, and mass-media imagery.

== Background ==
By the 1980s, portraiture had become one of Andy Warhol's most recognizable artistic pursuits, a status underscored by the 1979 retrospective Andy Warhol: Portraits of the 70s at the Whitney Museum of American Art in New York City. Having transformed celebrities such as Marilyn Monroe, Elizabeth Taylor, Elvis Presley, Yves Saint Laurent, Liza Minnelli, and Mick Jagger into Pop art icons, Warhol became increasingly interested in figures whose public image transcended popular culture. Among them was Queen Elizabeth II, whom the Guinness Book of Records had described as the most recognizable person in the world.

In 1982, Warhol's European dealer George C. P. Mulder contacted Buckingham Palace seeking permission to use the Queen's likeness in a portfolio of screenprints. Although the Palace declined to endorse the project, Queen Elizabeth's private secretary, Sir William Heseltine, stated that the Queen "would certainly not wish to put any obstacles in Mr Warhol's way."

== Description ==
The portraits were based on officially sanctioned photographs, which Warhol transformed through his signature silkscreen process, overlaying them with vivid, non-naturalistic colors and abstract blocks of color. The portrait of Queen Elizabeth II, for example, was derived from an image taken by royal photographer Peter Grugeon at Windsor Castle in 1975 and released for the monarch's 1977 Silver Jubilee.

The series was issued in a Standard Edition of 40 prints and a Royal Edition of 30 prints embellished with diamond dust. The heightened colors, dramatic contrasts, and accentuated facial features recall Warhol's earlier Ladies and Gentlemen series (1975), in which he portrayed New York drag queens with similarly bold palettes.

== Exhibitons ==
Reigning Queens debuted at Walton-Gilbert Galleries in New York City in June 1985. Warhol described the opening in his diary as "hitting rock bottom." He said, "This show, I have sunk to the bottom of the gutter. The rock bottom of the skids of the end of the line. It was like having an opening in somebody's rent-controlled apartment. I mean, they had a paper covering a mirror! And they had hors d'oeuvres that I think they were making in the kitchen. ... It was so low-down and tacky."

The portfolio was shown at the Leo Castelli Gallery in New York City from September 1985 to October 1985.

It was exhibited at the Cirrus Gallery in Los Angeles from December 1985 to February 1986.

In March 1986, there was a show at Elizabeth Nichol's Equinox Gallery in Vancouver.

== Critical reception ==
Reigning Queens has generated a mixed critical response, with reactions ranging from Warhol's own ambivalence to broader debates about the commodification of royalty. Warhol himself was displeased with the series being shown in the United States, noting in his diary: "I had my opening at Leo Castelli's to go to, of the Reigning Queens portfolio that I just hate George Mulder for showing here in America. They were supposed to be only for Europe—nobody here cares about royalty and it'll just be another bad review."

Reviewing the series for the Los Angeles Times in 1985, art historian Suzanne Muchnic described its "day-glo pinks and vivid primaries" as almost physically overwhelming, interpreting them as part of Warhol's critique of celebrity culture and mass reproduction. Writing for LA Weekly, art critic Peter Clothier argued that it is "almost superfluous to point to the blandness of these images, the irony of consumerism turned upon itself in high-art fashion, the commercialization of fame unearned and unasked for.

Later commentary has framed the series in more polarized terms. Writer Anthony Haden-Guest characterized the project as a "shameless assault on the rich kitsch market" in his book True Colors: The Real Life of the Art World (1998). Similarly, artist Alfredo Jaar described Reigning Queens as a "monument to kitsch" in the book Regarding Warhol: Sixty Artists, Fifty Years (2012).

Art critic Jonathan Jones of the Guardian referred to the portrait of Queen Elizabeth II as "a camp treat." He noted that the "carnival" colors of the varied prints emphasize the "repetitious nature of the image." He added, "At the same time there is an emotion in the way Warhol has drawn the Queen's features, tracing from a photograph in a way that suggests an attempt to imaginatively understand this face, this person. ... The Queen looks more human here because she is treated not as monarchs are meant to be, but as a celebrity like any other part of the long list of famous people Warhol depicted, Marilyn Monroe to Mick Jagger."

The British Royal Collection noted that Warhol "simplified Grugeon's portrait of Queen Elizabeth II so that all that remains is a mask-like face. All character has been removed and we are confronted by a symbol of royal power." Time magazine likewise observed that Warhol's portraits treat Queen Elizabeth II "like any other celebrity, frozen in time and bright colours," reinforcing the series' central tension between monarchy as an enduring institution and celebrity as a reproducible image.

== Collections ==
Four prints from the Royal edition of Queen Elizabeth II from the Reigning Queens series were acquired by the Royal Collection of the British royal family in 2012. These prints are the only ones in the Royal Collection that Queen Elizabeth did not sit for or commission.

The National Gallery in London has four prints of Queen Elizabeth II in their collection.

One print of Queen Beatrix was lost in 2024 after being accidentally disposed during renovations at a town hall in Uden, Maashorst.
