= Umphakatsi =

In Eswatini, an umphakatsi (Swazi: [um̩pʰakʼatsʼi]; plural imiphakatsi) is an administrative subdivision smaller than an inkhundla. There are 385 imiphakatsi in the country, each approximately equivalent to a local community. In western societies, it could be also equivalent to a township.

Imiphakatsi are either royal villages with a royal kraal or chief residences which are administered under a Swazi chief or a royal prince through Swazi law and custom. The official residence of the Ndlovukati at Ludzidzini is also designated an umphakatsi.
