= Ntfombi =

Queen Mother of Eswatini since 1983

- Ndlovukati
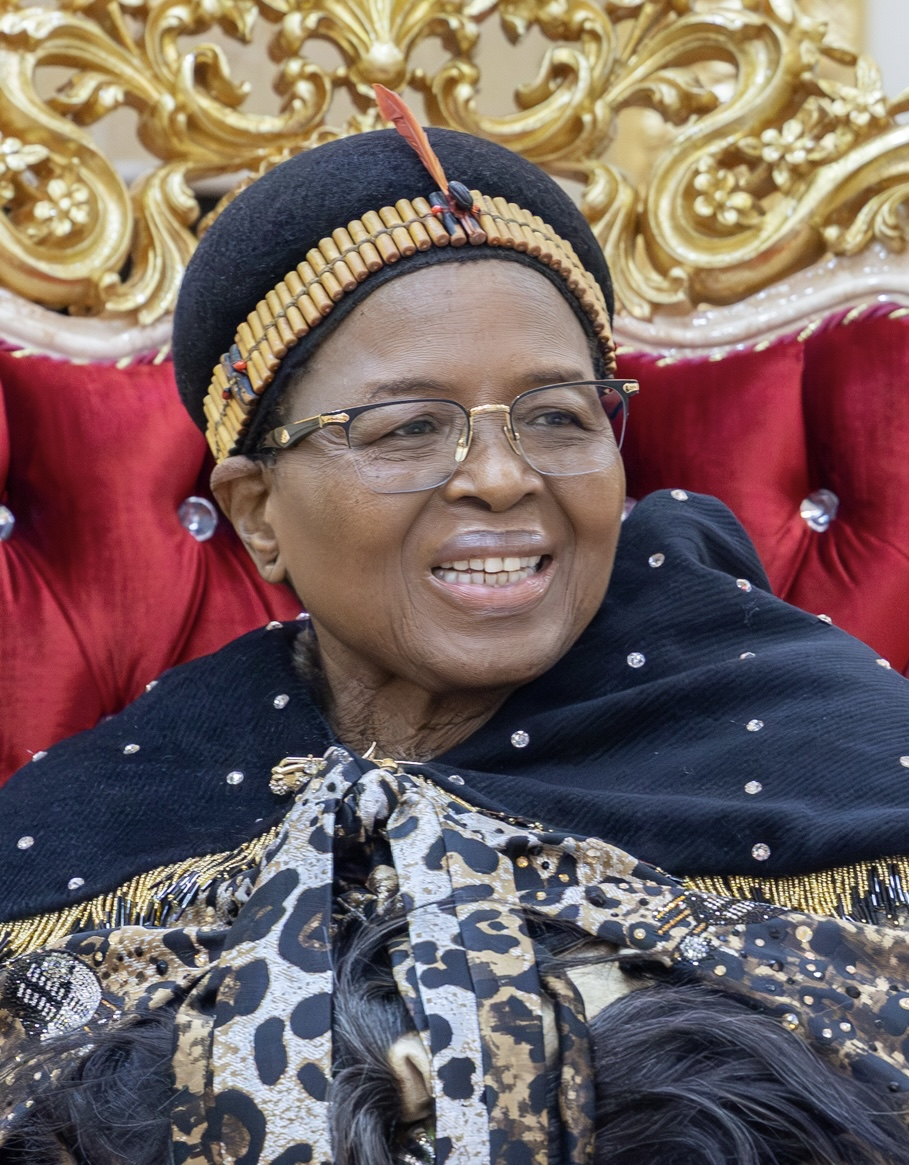
- Ntfombi in 2026

Queen Mother of Eswatini
- Reign: 10 August 1983 – present
- Coronation: 25 April 1986
- Predecessor: Dzeliwe
- King: Vacant (until 1986); Mswati III (since 1986)

Queen regent of Swaziland
- Regency: 10 August 1983 – 25 April 1986
- Predecessor: Dzeliwe (as queen regent)
- Successor: Mswati III (as king)
- Born: Ntfombi Tfwala; 27 December 1949 (age 76); Swaziland (now Eswatini)
- Spouse: Sobhuza II (died 1982)
- Issue: Mswati III
- House: Dlamini (by marriage)

Ntfombi Tfwala (also spelled Ntombi, born 27 December 1949) is queen mother (Ndlovukati) of Eswatini since 1983, as the mother and co-ruler of King Mswati III. She was also queen regent of Eswatini from 1983 until her son's accession in 1986.

== Marriage ==
Ntfombi was married to King Sobhuza II, with whom she had a son, Prince Makhosetive Dlamini.

== Regency ==
King Sobhuza had designated another of his wives, Queen Dzeliwe, as the Ndlovukati to reign as joint sovereign with his future successor. Instead of recognizing one of her sons as his heir apparent, he indicated to his Loqoqo (privy council) that he wanted Prince Makhosetive Dlamini to succeed him on the throne. In June 1982 he also extended the authority of the Loqoqo, empowering it to act as a "Supreme Council of State", free to appoint an "Authorised Person" to exercise the royal prerogative if a regent was deemed unable to do so properly.

After Sobhuza died in August 1982, Dzeliwe became queen regent during the minority of the designated heir to the throne, but the Loqoqo, consisting mostly of the late king's senior relatives, chiefs and advisors, usurped her authority and sacked Sobhuza's prime minister, Prince Mabandla Dlamini, whom Loqoqo members apparently feared would strip them of their new role. Once Prince Makhosetive Dlamini attained his majority and officially became king, his mother would then be expected to be designated as the new Ndlovukati. However, Queen Dzeliwe was placed under house arrest in 1983 and Ntfombi was selected as the new queen regent.

During her regency, she was included in Andy Warhol's portrait series in 1985 as one of four Reigning Queens, along with queens Beatrix of the Netherlands, Margrethe II of Denmark and Elizabeth II of the United Kingdom.

== Indlovukazi ==
Standard as queen mother

In 1986, when he turned 18, Makhosetive was crowned King Mswati III. Upon becoming king, as was the custom, he declared his mother to be the Indlovukazi (a title roughly corresponding to queen mother, literally translated as Great She-Elephant) and, as such, joint head of state. As queen mother, Ntfombi is seen as the spiritual and national head of state, while her son is considered the administrative head of state.

Regnal titles
Preceded by Queen Dzeliwe	Queen Mother of Eswatini; 1983–present	Incumbent
