= Launceston Town Hall =

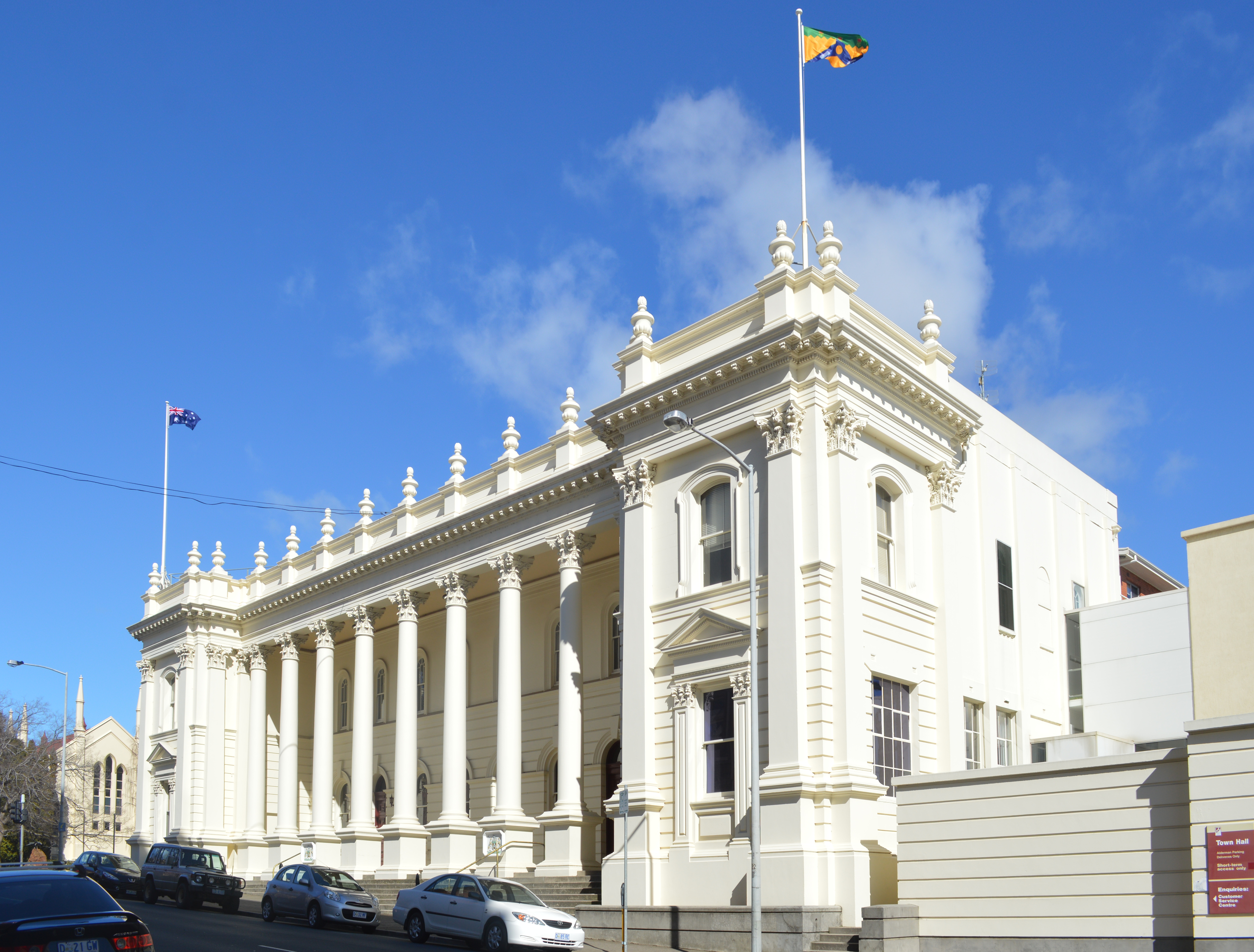
- The Launceston Town Hall, pictured in 2015
- Interactive map of the Launceston Town Hall area

General information
- Type: town hall
- Architectural style: Victorian
- Location: 18/28 St John St, Launceston, Tasmania, Australia
- Coordinates: 41°26′08.58″S 147°08′12.56″E
- Construction started: 1864
- Opened: 1867

Design and construction
- Architect: Peter Mills

The Launceston Town Hall is a historic town hall located at 18/28 St John Street in Launceston, Tasmania.

== History ==
The building project was commissioned by Launceston Town Council in 1864 to architect Peter Mills. The foundation stone was laid on 21 April 1864 by the Governor of Tasmania, Thomas Gore Browne. The structure came into use in 1867.

The building underwent several expansion and modification interventions throughout its history. Following an initial expansion in 1906, a major addition took place in 1936 when the grounds to the north of the original building became part of the municipal complex. These works also involved extending the building's colonnade by adding five columns to the original four ones. Other interventions occurred in 1970, 1988, and 1994.

== Description ==
The building features an Italianate style. The main façade is characterized by an imposing colonnade.

== Gallery ==
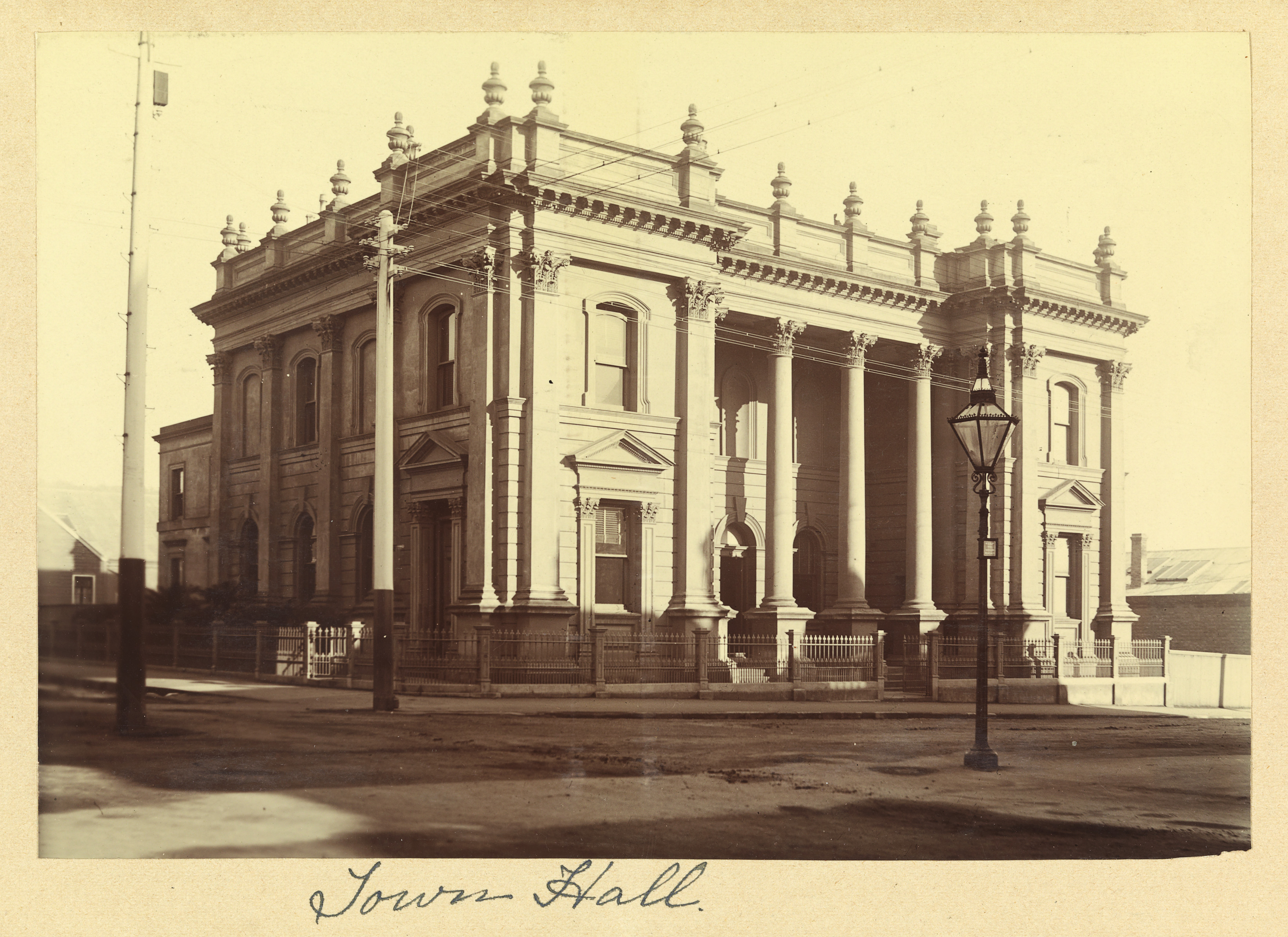

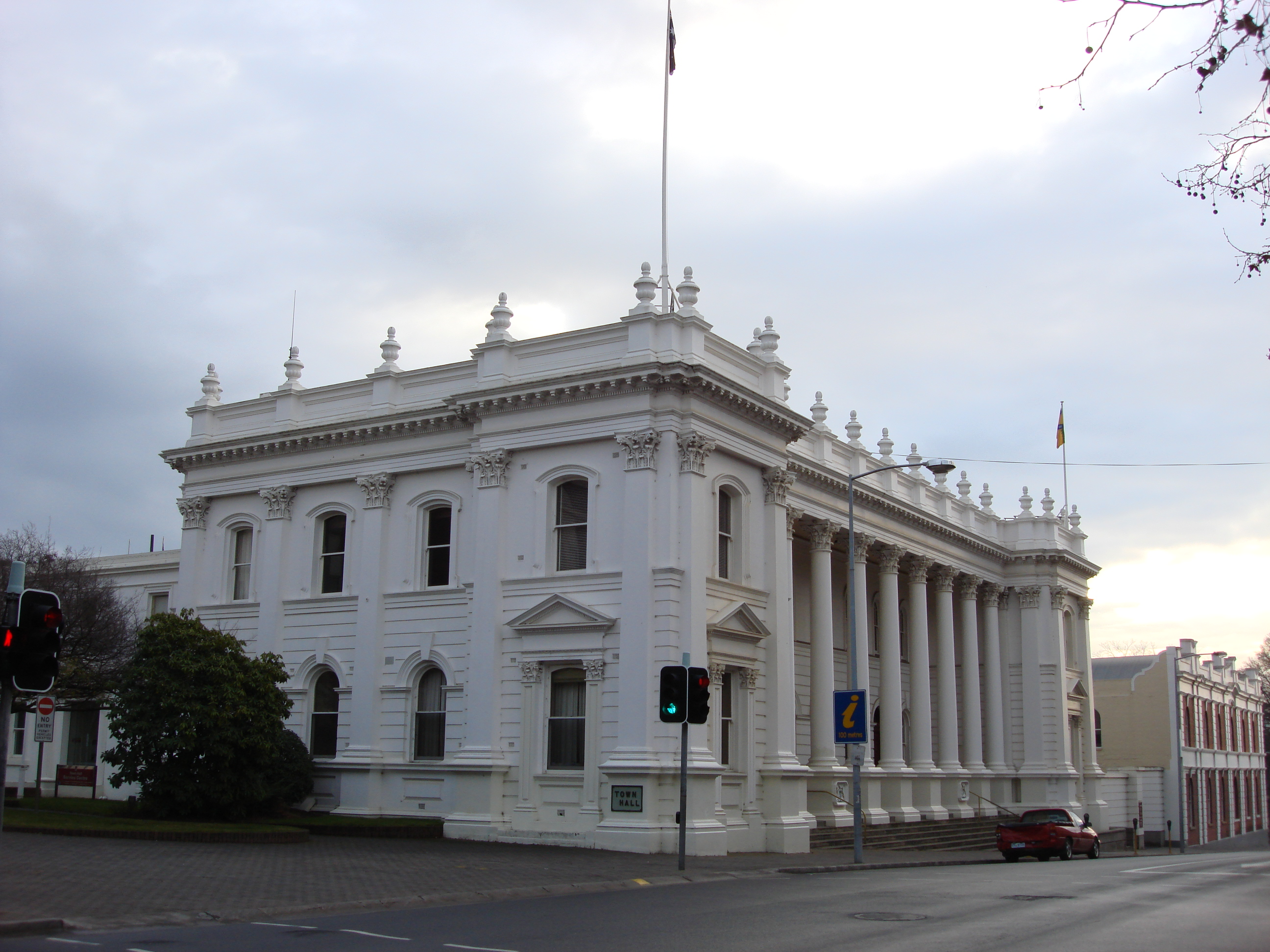

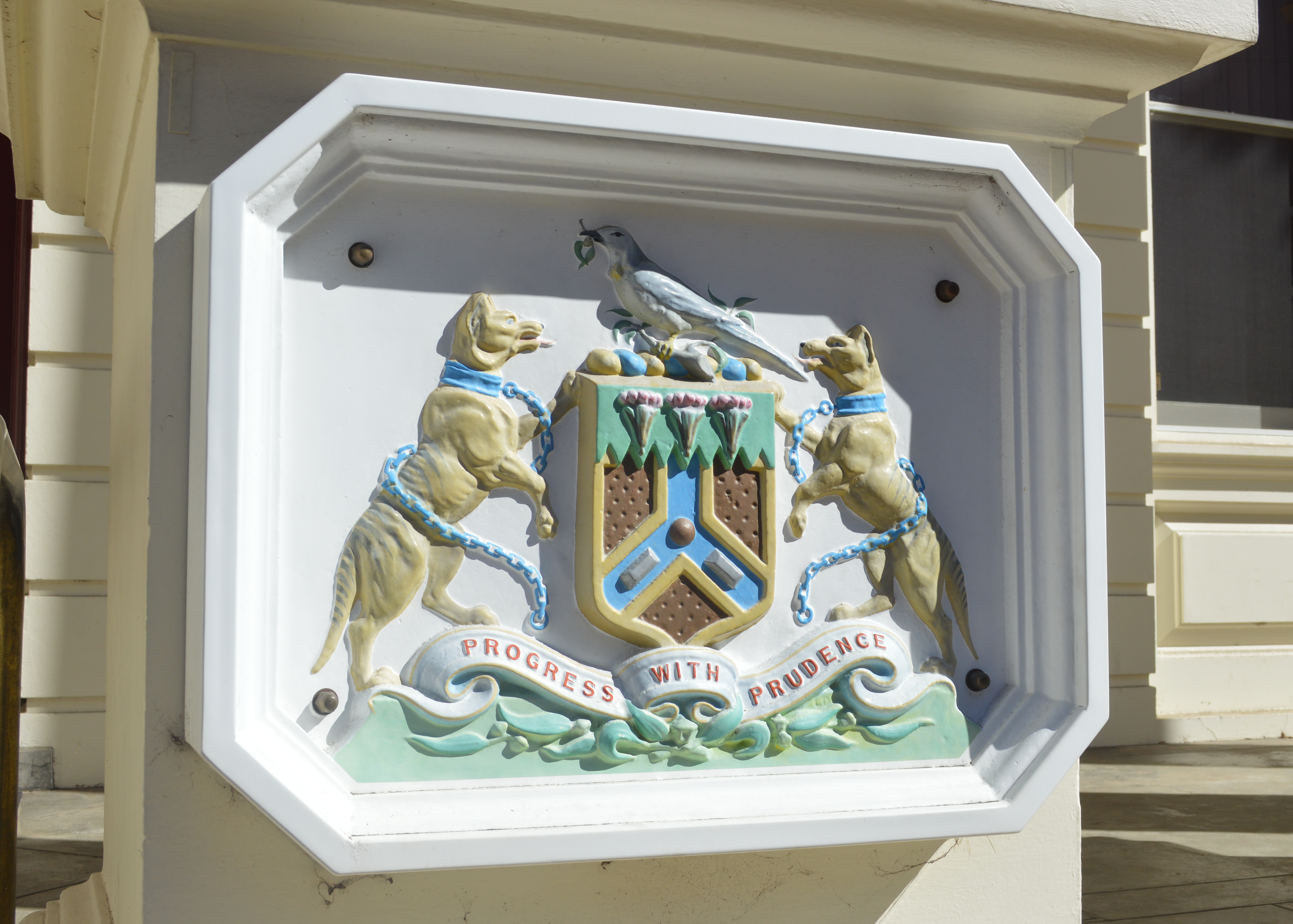
