= Zombodze =

Coordinates: 27°11′01″S 31°19′09″E

Zombodze Emuva is a village in Shiselweni, Eswatini. Its population as of the 2007 census was 16,067.

Zombodze Emuva is a royal village; many Swazi royals are buried on the burial hill there. King Mswati III pronounced the village royal given the history behind the village.
