= King of Eswatini =

Title of the male monarch of Eswatini

- Ngwenyama
- Coat of arms of Eswatini

Incumbent
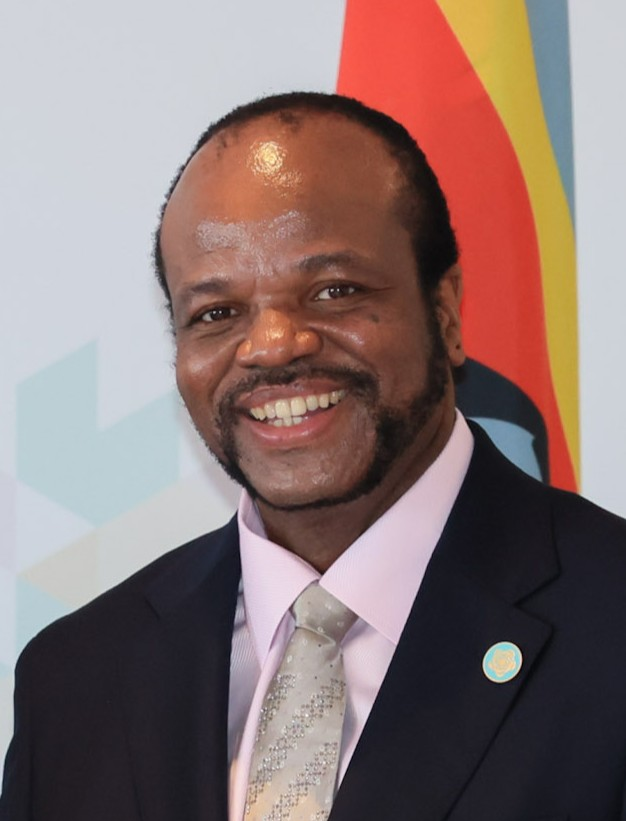
- Mswati III since 25 April 1986

Details
- Style: His Majesty
- Heir apparent: None declared
- First monarch: Mkhulunkosi
- Residences: Lozitha Palace, Lobamba

The King of Eswatini, officially Ngwenyama (lit. 'Lion' or 'He-Crocodile', pl. tiNgwenyama, also iNgwenyama or Inkosi), is the title of the male monarch and head of state of Eswatini. The King (Ngwenyama) reigns together with the Queen Mother (Indlovukazi), a spiritual leadership position held by the Ngwenyama's mother or another female royal of high status.

The current king is Mswati III, who has reigned since 1986. The annual budget allocated to the King and the royal household amounts to $61 million. The King is also the Commander-in-Chief of the army.

== Etymology ==
Ngwenyama means "Lion" in Swazi (which in turn comes from the word Ngwenya meaning "Crocodile", thus means "He-Crocodile") but in an honorific sense (akin to Arabic equivalent word, sayyid), as opposed to libhubesi, used to refer to lions in the literal sense. The title is sometimes written iNgwenyama, Ingwenyama, or ingweinyama, with the prefix i- (plural ti-, tiNgweniyama), meaning "the king". Ngwenyama is also a surname in Nguni languages.

== Powers ==
=== Executive ===
In Eswatini, executive authority is vested in the King, who serves as the head of state. The King may exercise this authority personally or delegate it to the Cabinet or an individual Minister. As head of state, the King has powers that include assenting to legislation, convening and dissolving Parliament, receiving diplomatic representatives, granting pardons or commuting sentences, declaring a state of emergency, bestowing honours, establishing commissions or vusela, and calling for a national referendum.

=== Economic ===
The Ngwenyama owns all minerals in Eswatini except for those owned by private corporations. The other aspects of mining are also controlled by the Ngwenyama.

=== Administrative ===
The Ngwenyama can appoint 20 (out of a maximum of 31) senators in the Senate of Eswatini and 10 (out of a maximum of 76) members of the House of Assembly of Eswatini. The Ngwenyama is also the head of the judicial system and the Chairman of the Swazi National Council. Local officials that are responsible for the governance of Eswatini are either appointed by the Ngwenyama, or their superiors are.

=== Cultural ===
Other powers of the Ngwenyama include allocating land, initiating national gatherings, disbursing wealth, organizing social events, and taking part in rituals. The Ngwenyama has royal praise singers called griots. The griots appear at public events and sing about the virtues of the Ngwenyama. Any offence against the Ngwenyama or Ndlovukati or their property is considered a heinous crime. It is illegal to wear the ruler's clothes, use their medicines, or be within a certain distance of them. Adultery with the Ndlovukati is treason, and the Ngwenyama can exile any citizen for any reason.

== Religious importance ==
During the Incwala, the Ngwenyama splits the sacred water to the east and west to signal the end of the last year. On the second day of the Incwala, youths gather special branches and place them in a special sanctuary. The Ngwenyama then sings with his subjects in the sanctuary, thus reaffirming their loyalty. Later the Ngwenyama lights a fire. The purpose of the festival is to secure the prosperity of the Kingdom of Eswatini. The Ngwenyama is also sometimes believed to be the cause of violent rain.

== History ==
Sobhuza II played an important role in the modernization of Eswatini. In the past, the royalist Imbokodvo National Movement consistently won the vast majority of seats while political parties were legal, thus gaining total control over the government. Ngwenyama Mswati III compromised the traditional tinkundla system, replacing parts of the system with modern Eswatini institutions.

== Succession ==
The Ngwenyama is traditionally succeeded by one of his sons. The heir is chosen based on the virtue of his mother.

== Royal standard ==
Royal Standard of Eswatini.

== See also ==
- List of monarchs of Eswatini
