= INyatsi yaMswati =

19th-century army of Eswatini

iNyatsi yaMswati ("The Buffalo of Mswati") was the national army of the Kingdom of Eswatini during the reign of King Mswati II in the 19th century. It was revived and is currently the national traditional army during King Mswati III's reign.

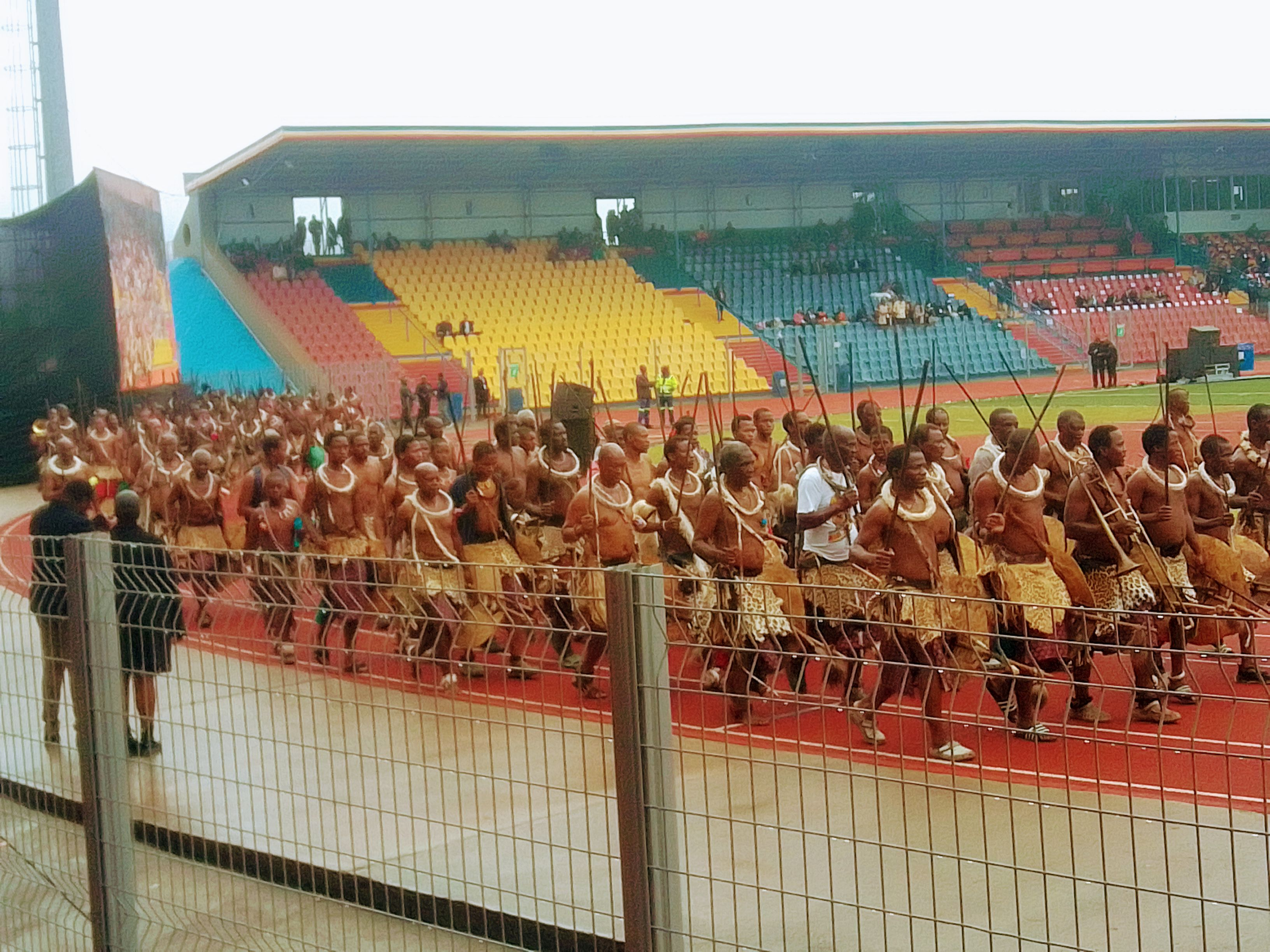
Members of iNyatsi yaMswati regiment enter the Somhlolo National Stadium during King Mswati III's 58th birthday in April 2026

== Background and formation ==
When Mswati II assume power in 1840, he reorganised his father King Sobhuza I's regiments and formed new ones. Amongst those that he revived were the Mlondolozi (also known as Balondolozi, meaning “guardians”), established by King Sobhuza I when he took power in 1818 and the Tichele regiment, which was originally established by Sobhuza I in 1826, in which Mswati II himself had been raised with Mbovane Fakudze.

Among the new regiments were the Hhohho regiment (commanded by Matsafeni Mdluli), the Tindlovu, Emahubhulu, Giba, Malalane, Mekemeke, Umbhula and Imigadlela.

The Tichele, Tindlovu and Emahubhulu were stationed at the residence of the Queen Mother Tsandzile Ndwandwe in Ludzidzini Royal Residence while the iNyatsi, Imigadlela and Giba were based at Mswati II’s administrative capital of Hhohho.

The iNyatsi regiment and Malalane were widely feared and conducted military campaigns against Bapedi westward and caused terror as far north as present‑day Zimbabwe.

The Malalane, Mekemeke and Umbhula were frontier regiments placed at Komatipoort, Louw's Creek and Badplaas to guard the kingdom’s borders.

The most prominent commanders of iNyatsi yaMswati were Sandlana Zwane, a statesman of the Kingdom and Sobhiyose Dlamini, a great‑great‑grandson of King Ndvungunye.

In about 1842, Mswati II ordered Sobhiyose to lead the iNyatsi regiment in an attack on the Bapedi leader Chief Mogoboya, who had occupied the Dlomodlomo Mountain in present-day Badplaas. The campaign was intended to clear the area for Queen Ngodzela Mkhonta, one of Mswati’s wives, so that the royal village of Embhuleni could be established. The operation succeeded and Embhuleni was founded around 1842.

One of the best known members of iNyatsi yaMswati was Prince Mbilini waMswati, the eldest son of King Mswati II. Mbilini was widely regarded as his father’s favourite son and was seen by many as the natural heir. However, because his mother was Mswati’s first wife, Swazi custom prevented him from succeeding to the throne and after Mswati II's death in 1868, the iNyatsi regiment was weakened and some factions left with Mbilini to Zulu Kingdom under King Cetshwayo kaMpande.

== Swazi regiments by ruler ==
- King Ndvungunye - Tichele
- King Sobhuza I (Somhlolo) – Umlondolozi (singular) (Balondolozi (plural))
- King Mswati II – iNyatsi
- King Mbandzeni – iNdlavela
- King Bhunu – Ingulube
- King Sobhuza II – Umlondolozi (Balondolozi)
- King Mswati III – iNyatsi
