= Mbovane Fakudze =

19th-century Swazi chief

- Born: c. 1825 eLangeni, Kingdom of Swaziland
- Died: 1887; Nkhanini
- Burial place: Mdzimba Mountain
- Occupations: Chief and Governor of Nkhanini Royal Residence
- Known for: Governor of the Queen Mother Sisile 'LaMgangeni' Khumalo's royal residence; military commander
- Spouse: Mukwa Magongo
- Children: Makhambane Fakudze
- Parents: Mngayi Fakudze (father); Lomaphepha Mavuso (mother)

Mbovane Fakudze (c. 1825 – 1887) was a 19th-century Swazi chief who served as the governor of the Nkhanini Royal Residence, the royal court of the Queen Mother (Ndlovukati) Sisile 'LaMgangeni' Khumalo, in Lobamba during the reign of King Mbandzeni.

He was a son of Mngayi Fakudze, a prominent Swazi military general known for leading Swazi forces to victory at the Battle of Lubuya in 1839.

== Early life ==
Mbovane Fakudze belonged to the same age-grade generation as King Mswati II. Both were raised within the Tichele regiment during the reign of King Sobhuza I (Mswati II's father).

== Historical role ==
Following the execution of governor Mgenge Matsebula and Prince Ndwandwa Dlamini after the mysterious death of Crown Prince Ludvonga II in 1872, Fakudze was appointed to replace him in 1874. He took office as the governor of the Nkhanini Royal Residence under Queen Mother Ndlovukati Sisile Khumalo.

Following a severe political fallout with King Mbandzeni in 1881, Queen Mother Sisile prepared to flee for her safety upon learning that the King intended to target her. Fakudze counselled her against fleeing. Despite his advice, the Queen Mother fled into the night, assisted by Mbabane Kunene. Fakudze travelled to Mbekelweni to report her escape to the king, after which the Queen Mother was captured by Mbandzeni's regiments near Gobholo (close to modern-day Mbabane). She was returned to the royal court and executed in February 1881.

Fakudze was present when the Boers of the Transvaal signed a cooperation treaty with King Mbandzeni at Nkhanini in 1875. In the late 1870s, he led King Mbandzeni's Indlavela regiment to assist British forces in their campaign against the Bapedi at Mshadza, in what became known as the Battle of Mshadza.
