= Nkhanini Royal Residence =

Royal residence in Hhohho, Eswatini

Nkhanini Nkanini, eNkhanini
- Royal Kraal (Royal Residence)
- Country: Eswatini
- District: Hhohho
- Constituency: Lobamba

Government
  - Type: Traditional royal kraal
  - Body: Nkhanini Inner Council
  - Indvuna (Governor): Lusendvo Fakudze

The Nkhanini Royal Residence (also spelt Nkanini or eNkhanini) is a historic royal kraal (royal residence) in Lobamba, Hhohho District, Eswatini. It was the principal royal seat of the Queen Mother (Ndlovukati) Sisile 'LaMgangeni' Khumalo during King Mbandzeni's reign. The modern administrative capital of Lobamba was built on the site of the former traditional royal house of Nkhanini.

The first governor of Nkhanini was Mgenge Matsebula, who was put to death alongside Prince Ndwandwa Dlamini by the royal court following the mysterious death of the Crown Prince Ludvonga II in 1872. Matsebula was replaced by Mbovane Fakudze, a son of Mngayi Fakudze, in 1874.

Nkhanini is the area where King Ngwane III was born in the 18th century.

It is also the royal site where the newly crowned King Mbandzeni was shown to the public in June 1875 by Sandlana Zwane.

It is also the site where the Queen Mother Sisile 'LaMgangeni' Khumalo was put to death by King Mbandzeni in February 1881.

== See also ==
- List of monarchs of Eswatini
- History of Eswatini
