= File Ndwandwe =

- Queen consort of Eswatini
- Spouse: King Sobhuza I
- Issue: Prince Ndwandwa
- House: Ndwandwe
- Father: King Zwide kaLanga

File Ndwandwe was a Swazi queen consort of King Sobhuza I and a member of the Ndwandwe lineage. She was Queen Tsandzile Ndwandwe's younger half-sister and the daughter of King Zwide kaLanga. She briefly held the position of Ndlovukati (Queen Mother) following the death of Tsandzile Ndwandwe in 1875, before the appointment of Queen Sisile 'LaMgangeni' Khumalo by the Liqoqo.

== Background ==
According to Nguni custom, a high-ranking bride was accompanied by younger female relatives and attendants to her marriage. Among those who accompanied Tsandzile Ndwandwe were her half-sisters, including File Ndwandwe, LaVumisa Ndwandwe and Veya Ndwandwe, who later became co-wives of King Sobhuza I. Queen File bore Prince Ndwandwa.

Following the death of Sobhuza I in 1836, she left the royal residence near Mdzimba Mountain and settled with her son Ndwandwa in the Ngwemphisi region.

Ndwandwa later established a homestead at Mbhidlimbhidli, near Ludvondvolo Mountain and lived with her. Following the death of King Mswati II in 1868, Ndwandwa was moved to Ludzidzini where he was appointed the senior prince of Kingdom of Eswatini and lived with the Crown Prince Ludvonga II. In 1872, Ludvonga II died before he could become the king and Ndwandwa was accused of having a hand in the Crown Prince's death. He was put to death and File Ndwandwe was moved from Mbhidlimbhidli to Ludzidzini where she lived with Tsandzile. When Tsandzile died in 1875, File briefly held the position of Ndlovukati (Queen Mother) before the appointment of Queen Sisile 'LaMgangeni' Khumalo by the Liqoqo.
