= Sandlana Zwane =

Swazi Military Comander

- Born: c.1810 Mbekelweni, Eswatini
- Died: 9 December 1888
- Occupations: Commander of iNyatsi yaMswati; Governor of Ludzidzini Royal Village

Sandlana Zwane (c.1810 – 9 December 1888) was a 19th-century Swazi military commander and the governor of Ludzidzini Royal Village. He was a statesman and served under Kings Sobhuza I, Mswati II and Mbandzeni.

When King Mswati II established the iNyatsi yaMswati regiment upon taking power in 1840, Zwane was appointed as its commander. He was already a member of the Liqoqo.

== Early life ==
Sandlana Zwane was born in c.1810 at Mbekelweni. He was a member of the Tichele regiment, formed by King Sobhuza I around 1826 for individuals born in 1810. The Tichele is also the same regiment through which King Mswati II and Mbovane Fakudze were raised.

Zwane rose to prominence as a military leader during the reign of Mswati II, commanding the iNyatsi yaMswati regiment.

In February 1862, he led Swazi forces in military operations in the Gaza region, supporting Prince Mawewe Nxumalo in his succession conflict against his brother Prince Mzila Nxumalo. Swazi forces under Zwane defeated Mzila’s forces at Macarretane.

== Political and administrative role ==
Zwane later served as governor of Ludzidzini, the royal capital, during the period of the reign of Queen Mother Tsandzile Ndwandwe and her son King Mswati II.

He was born, and spent time residing at Mbekelweni, which later functioned as an administrative center during the reign of King Mbandzeni.

On 21 July 1855, he witnessed the signing of an agreement between Mswati II and the Volksraad of Lydenburg, as well as the delivery of cattle in February 1860 as part of payment for land. He was a member of the Liqoqo.

In June 1875, the Liqoqo tasked Zwane with presenting the newly crowned King Mbandzeni to the public
