= Ludlambedlu =

Royal cattle herd in Eswatini

- Type: Royal cattle herd of the King of Eswatini
- Location: Eswatini

Ludlambedlu refers to the royal cattle herd of the Eswatini monarchy, specifically the cattle owned by the King.

== Herd ==
The herd is an integral part of Eswatini's royal history, culture, and wealth. It is deeply associated with the Nkhaba Royal Kraal, the royal family in Hhohho responsible for the care and management of the King’s cattle. Ludlambedlu has long represented both the economic strength and the symbolic power of the Eswatini monarchy. Cattle were, and still are, regarded as a symbol of wealth, fertility, and status. For the royal family, these cattle are more than just wealth; they play a vital role in the monarch's ceremonial duties and serve as a crucial connection to the kingdom’s ancestors; use for royal rituals.

== History ==
The Nkhaba Royal Kraal that manages the Ludlambedlu cattle herd is one of the most prominent royal kraals in Eswatini. It was established in the 1800s by the descendants of Prince Malunge, a son of King Ndvungunye.

Following the death of King Sobhuza I in 1836, his senior son, Prince Malambule gained power and influence as regent, alongside Queen Lojiba Simelane, overseeing the Ludlambedlu until Mswati II came of age in 1840 and appointed as King. However, when Malambule was supposed to relinquish power to his younger brother, he refused and after a bitter dispute with Mswati, Malambule attempted to steal the cattle but was defeated in a military campaign led by his half-brother, Prince Somcuba. After the defection of Malambule to Zulu Kingdom under King Mpande, Somcuba assumed some of the powers that Malambule had previously held and became a dominant figure within the kingdom, including heading the Ludlambedlu, appointed by King Mswati II. Somcuba built a royal outpost in west of capital, in present-day Mooiplaas in Mpumalanga, called Eludlambedlwini ("at the place of the Ludlambedlu"), where the Ludlambedlu grazed. Following the fallout of Mswati and Somcuba, the cattle were kept at Embhuleni and then moved to Nkhaba.
