= Tibati Nkambule =

Queen Mother of Swaziland
- Reign: 1881–1895
- Predecessor: Sisile 'LaMgangeni' Khumalo
- Successor: Labotsibeni Mdluli
- King: Mbandzeni (until 1889); None (since 1889)

Queen regent of Swaziland
- Regency: 1889–1895
- Predecessor: Mbandzeni (as king)
- Successor: Bhunu (as king)
- Born: Tibati Madvolomafisha Nkambule
- Died: c. February 1895
- Burial: Mbilaneni
- Spouse: King Mswati II
- Issue: Mbandzeni
- Father: Chief Mbandzeni Nkambule

Tibati Madvolomafisha Nkambule (died c. February 1895) was the Queen Mother of Swaziland from 1881 to 1889. She was the aunt of King Mbandzeni and following Mbandzeni's death in 1889, she served as the Queen Regent of Swaziland during the minority of King Bhunu, Mbandzeni's son.

She was a wife of King Mswati II and the sister of Nandzi Nkambule, King Mbandzeni's biological mother. Both King Mswati II and Tibati had a son named Longcongco.

== Background ==
Both Tibati and King Mbandzeni's mother, Nandzi Nkambule, were sisters. They were the daughters of Mbandzeni Nkambule, a Swazi chief of the Nkambule clan.

Nandzi was put to death by King Mswati II while Mbandzeni was still young. Mbandzeni was therefore raised by Sisile 'LaMgangeni' Khumalo, another of King Mswati II's wives and mother of the Crown Prince Ludvonga II.

Following the death of King Mswati II in 1868, the Liqoqo, a royal advisory committee, selected LaMgangeni to be Queen regent of Swaziland while her son Ludvonga II was a minor but in 1872 Ludvonga II unexpectedly died from poisoning. Following this period of mourning, LaMgangeni was entrusted once again by the council with identifying a successor amongst Mswati II's sons and she selected Mbandzeni.

In 1881, Mbandzeni put LaMgangeni to death following a fallout with the King and Tibati was named the Queen Mother of Swaziland from 1881 until her death in 1895.

Regnal titles
Preceded by King Dlamini IV of Swaziland	Queen Regent of Swaziland; 1889–1895	Succeeded by King Ngwane V of Swaziland
