= KoNtjingila =

Chiefdom in Eswatini

KoNtjingila KoNtjingila Royal Kraal
- Traditional chiefdom
- Country: Eswatini
- Region: Shiselweni Region

Government
  - Type: Traditional chiefdom
  - Chief: Sikelela Simelane (Chief Bhozongo)
  - Former leader: Gelane Zwane
- Ethnic group: Simelane

KoNtjingila or KoNtjingila Royal Kraal is a traditional chiefdom located in the Shiselweni Region of Eswatini. It holds significant historical and cultural importance for the Simelane royal lineage in the Kingdom.

== Historical background ==
The Simelane clan, originally from Empangeni in present-day KwaZulu-Natal, South Africa, migrated to the area south of the Phongolo River due to regional conflicts with the Ndwandwe Kingdom. Following the death of their chief, Mabonya who was killed in a battle, the Simelane people, led by the heir Bhozongo (Mabonya's eldest son) and supported by Macala (Mabonya's younger brother), moved into the Ngwane Kingdom. During King Ndvungunye's reign, two Simelane women, Somnjalose Simelane and Lojiba Simelane (sisters of Chief Mabonya), were given in marriage to the king when the clan was seeking refuge at his territory. Somnjalose bore King Sobhuza I, which cemented the Simelane's prominence in Swazi history.

The Simelane were granted land at KoNtjingila, strategically positioned to serve as a buffer against invasions from the south. Notably, when King Sobhuza I died in 1836, Lojiba Simelane (his aunt) acted as regent alongside Sobhuza's senior son, Prince Malambule while Mswati II was still young to assume power. And during this period, the Simelane, under the leadership of Chief Mbiko Simelane, defended the kingdom against external threats when they participated in the Battle of Lubuya, a war fought in 1839 between the Zulu Kingdom under King Dingane, and the Swazi Kingdom.

== Leadership and chieftaincy disputes ==
KoNtjingila has experienced periods of leadership disputes, particularly involving the Simelane royal household or KoNtjingila Royal Kraal. In 2011, a significant controversy arose when acting Chief and President of the Senate of Eswatini, Gelane Zwane was accused of hiring tractors to plough royal fields during the funeral of Prince Msongelwa Enos Simelane, a senior member of the royal family. This act was perceived by many as a sign of disrespect, intensifying existing tensions within the clan.

Zwane defended her actions, asserting her authority as acting chief and claiming the ploughing occurred after the funeral proceedings. She emphasized her leadership role and dismissed criticisms as part of ongoing disputes over the chieftaincy.

== Transition of power ==
On October 12, 2022, a significant transition occurred when Gelane Zwane officially handed over the chieftaincy to Sikelela Simelane, a child of the late Chief Mabonya, who was introduced to King Mswati III at Ludzidzini Palace and bestowed with the title Chief Bhozongo. This event marked the end of Zwane's tenure and the beginning of a new chapter in KoNtjingila's leadership. The ceremony was part of a broader initiative where the King blessed chiefs from various chiefdoms, reinforcing traditional governance structures in Eswatini.
