= LaVumisa Ndwandwe =

Wife of King Sobhuza I

- Born: Ndwandwe kingdom
- Died: Swaziland
- Title: Queen
- Spouse: King Sobhuza I
- Children: Prince Malambule; Prince Tsekwane; Prince Fika Dlamini
- Parent: Vumisa Ndwandwe (father)
- Relatives: Queen Tsandzile Ndwandwe (cousin); King Zwide kaLanga (uncle)

LaVumisa Ndwandwe was one of King Sobhuza I's wives and the niece of King Zwide kaLanga. She is known for being the mother of Sobhuza I's senior son, Prince Malambule, who served as regent of the monarch from 1836 until King Mswati II came of age in 1840.

Together with her cousin, Queen Tsandzile Ndwandwe, LaVumisa's marriage to Sobhuza I was an arranged union intended to end the war between the neighbouring Swazi and Ndwandwe kingdoms, as they had it in mind that blood relatives would no longer attack each other. King Sobhuza I's daughter, Prince Pholile, was given to King Zwide also in return to marry.

According to Nguni custom, a high-ranking bride was accompanied by younger female relatives and attendants to her marriage. She accompanied Tsandzile Ndwandwe to her marriage to King Sobhuza I with other half-sisters, including File Ndwandwe and Veya Ndwandwe, who later became co-wives of King Sobhuza I.

After the death of Sobhuza I in 1836, her son Malambule assumed the role of regent - serving alongside Queen Lojiba Simelane and supported by Sobhuza I's brother Prince Malunge waNdvungunye and Sobhuza I's son Prince Somcuba - until King Mswati II reached the age required to rule in his own right in 1840.

Earlier when Sobhuza was sick, LaVumisa sought to persuade him to consider Malambule as his successor in case he died untimely and to prevent Swaziland from falling into a prolonged period of instability under a child's rule. Notably, Malambule was already a grown man at the time, making him a suitable candidate to assume the throne. Sobhuza agreed but when he recovered from his sickness he changed his mind and made the decision to appoint Mswati II, Tsandzile's son, as the heir.

Since Mswati II was only 12 years old when Sobhuza died, Malambule ruled on his behalf until around 1845, when Mswati had matured and was ready to assume authority. However, Malambule refused to relinquish power, leading to a conflict between the two brothers. This struggle culminated in Malambule being expelled from the royal family. After fights, Malambule was defeated and he fled with his brothers, Princes Tsekwane, Fokoti, Sidubela and Ndlela to seek refuge with the Zulu King, Mpande in 1847. While in Zululand, Malambule continued to launch unsuccessful attacks on Mswati and raided his cattle but eventually fell out with Mpande. He later returned to Swaziland and quietly settled at a Christian mission in Mahamba, but his presence there, once discovered, caused tensions between Mswati and the missionaries. Meanwhile, LaVumisa remained loyal and continued to support Mswati's reign as king. Later, Tsekwane returned to Swaziland and was given an area in the south-west of Swaziland by King Bhunu (a grandson of his brother Mswati II), known as kaLavumisa.

== Recognitions ==
- Lavumisa, a town in Shiselweni district, Eswatini
