= Mngayi Fakudze =

Swazi military general

- Born: c. 1780; Eswatini
- Died: c. 1855 eLangeni, Eswatini
- Buried: Nokwane
- Allegiance: Kingdom of Swaziland
- Branch: Swazi Army (Balondolozi regiment)
- Rank: Senior General under King Sobhuza I
- Conflicts: Battle of Lubuya (1839)
- Spouse: Lomaphepha Mavuso
- Children: Mbovane Fakudze (son)

Mngayi Fakudze (c. 1780 – c. 1855) was a Swazi senior military general under King Sobhuza I. He is best known for commanding Swazi forces during the Zulu invasion of 1839, leading them to victory at the Battle of Lubuya, and helping secure Swazi independence from Zulu domination.

Fakudze served as the principal general of King Sobhuza I's Balondolozi regiment.

== Early life ==
Mngayi Fakudze was born around 1780, the son of Mlobokazane Fakudze and his wife LaMagongo. Oral history suggests that he was born around the period of the formation of the Balondolozi regiment by King Sobhuza I's father, King Ndvungunye.

When Sobhuza I established a royal residence for his aunt, Queen Mother Lojiba Simelane, at eLangeni near the Mdzimba Mountain, Mngayi was appointed governor (indvuna) of the royal homestead. He married Lomaphepha Mavuso, the mother of Mbovane Fakudze who later became the governor of the Nkhanini Royal Residence in 1874.

Mngayi died in approximately 1855 and was buried near his elder brother, Matheleka Fakudze, at Nokwane.

== Historical role ==
At the beginning of 1839, the Zulu king Dingane dispatched a strong expeditionary force of regiments to subdue the Swazi and incorporate their territory into the Zulu sphere. The Zulu forces marched into Eswatini across the Pongola River and prepared to attack.

The Swazi gathered under the command of Mngayi Fakudze and met the Zulu army near the Lubuya River, not far from the present‑day town of Hlatikulu in Eswatini. The fighting lasted an entire day, resulting in heavy casualties on both sides. Two of the Zulu's four regiments were almost completely destroyed, forcing the remaining Zulu units to abandon the field and withdraw into Zululand the following day.

On 20 June 1844, Mngayi was present at the royal court when the missionary James Allison met King Mswati II and members of the Swazi royal family to request permission to establish the kingdom's first Christian mission station.
