= Mbabane Kunene =

- Born: c. 1820; Swazi Kingdom
- Died: before 1890
- Occupation: Royal servant
- Known for: Namesake of Mbabane
- Children: Maloyi Kunene
- Father: Ngongoma Kunene

Mbabane Kunene was a 19th century Swazi chief who served under King Mbandzeni as the governor of Mbuluzi. He is the namesake of the city of Mbabane, Eswatini.

== Early life and background ==
Mbabane Kunene was born around 1820, the son of Ngongoma Kunene, who served as a personal spiritual intermediary for the Eswatini royal family at Ludzidzini during the reign of King Mswati II. His father Ngongoma Kunene was responsible for preparing sacred cleansing waters for Queen Tsandzile Ndwandwe, the mother of King Mswati II. The King later ordered his death when the sacred waters disappeared at the royal house.

Following his father's death, Mbabane Kunene relocated to the Ezulwini Valley and later appointed governor of Mbuluzi where he was responsible for overseeing the slaughtering of King Mbandzeni's cattle.

== Conflict and exile ==
Mbabane Kunene assisted Queen Sisile 'LaMgangeni' Khumalo, the Queen mother of Eswatini, in 1881 when she escaped King Mbandzeni during the night. Mbandzeni regiments captured LaMgangeni in Gobholo, near Mbabane and taken to the royal kraal at Nkanini in Lobamba, where she was killed.

Mbabane Kunene managed to escape during these events and fled to Chrissiesmeer (in present-day Mpumalanga, South Africa).

He later returned to Eswatini but did not immediately rejoin the royal court, as King Mbandzeni no longer trusted him. He died before 1890 and the Mbabane river was named after him. European settlers built a town in the river area and named it Mbabane.

Mbabane's known son was named Maloyi Kunene and died in 1942. Maloyi was raised in Zombodze and herded cattle with the young Sobhuza II.
