= Ndwandwa Dlamini =

- Senior Prince of Eswatini from 1868 to 1872
- Died: 1872; Ludzidzini Royal Village, Eswatini
- Burial: Mdzimba Mountain
- Spouse: Ntethekazana Mkhonta
- Issue: Mbozise Dlamini
- House: House of Dlamini
- Father: King Sobhuza I
- Mother: Queen File Ndwandwe

Ndwandwa Dlamini (died 1872) was a Swazi prince and senior member of the House of Dlamini. He was a son of King Sobhuza I with Queen File Ndwandwe.

Following the death of his father Sobhuza, Ndwandwa lived in the Ngwemphisi region and later established a homestead at Mbhidlimbhidli, near Ludvondvolo Mountain, where he lived with his mother.

Following the death of his brother King Mswati II in 1868, Ndwandwa was appointed as the senior prince of the Kingdom of Eswatini and supported the regency of his aunt Queen Tsandzile Ndwandwe and uncle Prince Malunge waNdvungunye and the appointment of Queen Sisile 'LaMgangeni' Khumalo during the minority of Crown Prince Ludvonga II. He lived with Ludvonga II at Ludzidzini and was responsible for taking care of him.

In 1871, Bishop Thomas Edward Wilkinson came to Swaziland and met with Ndwandwa and the Queen Mother Sisile but was not allowed to see the young Crown Prince Ludvonga II.

== Death of Ludvonga II and execution ==
In 1872, Crown Prince Ludvonga II died mysteriously before he could become the King and Ndwandwa was subsequently accused of involvement in the prince's death.

He was brought before a royal council led by Prince Malunge waNdvungunye, Prince Sobandla waNdvungunye and Prince Maloyi waSomhlolo. Following the proceedings, Ndwandwa was found guilty and executed at Ludzidzini.

A headman named Mgenge Matsebula of Nkhanini and a local chief, Nkamane Mkhatshwa, were also executed in connection with the incident. Ndwandwa was buried at Mdzimba Mountain.
