= Hluti =

- Location in Eswatini
- Coordinates: 27°13′18″S 31°35′23″E
- Country: Eswatini
- District: Shiselweni
- Elevation: 2,000 ft (610 m)

Population (2005)
  - Total: 6,763
- Time zone: UTC+2 (SAST)

Hluti is a town situated in the Shiselweni region of Eswatini, located beyond Nhlangano and before Lavumisa As of 2005, it has a population of 6,763. It is made up of two constituencies; Shiselweni I and Hosea inkundla. Development has been slow in this town for years, but recently the Eswatini government launched the Mpakeni water project, which will supply water in neighboring homes and the newly built shopping complex .

== Shiselweni I ==
Shiselweni I constituency is made up of six chiefdoms, namely Ezikhotheni under chief Zwide .Ezikhoteni is also a hub for community forestry and home to King Sobhuza II's mother Lomawa Ndwandwe. Mchinisweni chiefdom under Sigodo Hlophe in Mantambe. Dumenkungwini under chief Landokwkhe Ntsangase, Manyandzeni under chief Ngome Ndlangamandla who also serves as Senator in the parliament of Eswatini. Mabonabulawe under chief Selebona Ntsangase . Shawnette Henwood is the incumbent member of parliament 2023- 2028

== Hosea Inkundla ==
Hosea also houses six chiefdoms namely; Hhohho emuva, under chief Ndabankulu Simelane, Manysiseni under chief Bhejisa Lushaba, Ondiyaneni under chief Shemane Nxumalo, Nsingizini under chief Susa Dlamini. Nsingizini is also home to renowned football club Nsingizini Hot Spurs, Lushini under batfwabenkhosi and Ludzakeni umphakatsi.Sifiso Mabuza is the newly elected member of parliament. He is the brother of Jabulane Mabuza and incarnated Mduduzi Bacede Mabuza.

== Schools ==
There are 32 schools in Hluti ten(10) being high schools, namely Our Lady of Sorrows Franscon Christian high, Florence Christian academy, Hluti Central, Masiphula High, Hosea High, Jericho, Mantambe, Makhava High, and Nsingizini High school and twenty two (22) primary schools.
