= Fana Dlamini =

Chief of Mekemeke (b.1854-d.1929)

Fana
- Chief of Mekemeke
- Reign: c. 1920 – c. 1929
- Predecessor: Mekemeke Magongo (mother)
- Successor: Monile (sister; regent)
- Born: Fana Dlamini c.1854 eNzingeni royal settlement, Piggs Peak, Swaziland (now Eswatini)
- Died: c. 1929; Alberts Home, Transvaal
- Burial: Ntfonjeni, near eMakhosini, Swaziland
- Spouse: Ntfwati Mabuza
- Issue: Prince Lombaluko Dlamini
- House: Dlamini
- Father: King Mswati II
- Mother: Mekemeke Magongo

Fana Dlamini (c. 1854 - c. 1929) was a Swazi prince and the chief of Mekemeke in Louw's Creek, Mpumalanga, South Africa. He was a son of King Mswati II of Swaziland and Mekemeke Magongo.

== Early life and rule ==
Fana was born around 1854. In about 1866, at approximately twelve years of age, he was brought by his mother Mekemeke Magongo to her settlement at eKusoleni (Mekemeke), a Louw's Creek village established as a military outpost by King Mswati II on the eastern portion of the Barberton district.

Following the death of her mother around 1920, Fana succeeded her as chief. After his accession, he relocated the chiefly village from eKusoleni to Alberts Home 20, where he later died around 1929.

== Burial and succession ==
When he died, Fana was carried to Swaziland where he was buried at a place known as Ntfonjeni, near eMakhosini, the traditional burial place for Swazi royal members other than Mbilaneni.

His elder sister, Princess Monile, ruled as regent while Fana's son, Lombaluko (born 1917) was still a minor. Prince Lombaluko was installed as Chief of Mekemeke in 1935 and governed until his death in December 1944.
