= Battle of Lubuya =

Swazi-Zulu War of 1839

- Part of Swazi-Zulu conflicts
| Date | 1839 |
| Location | Lubuya River, near Hlatikhulu, KwaZulu-Natal |
| Result | Swazi victory |

Belligerents
| Zulu Kingdom | Swazi Kingdom |

Commanders and leaders
| General Masiphula Ntshangase; King Dingane | General Mngayi Fakudze; Regent Lojiba Simelane; Regent Prince Malambule |

Casualties and losses
| Substantial losses, 2 regiments annihilated | |

The Battle of Lubuya was a Swazi-Zulu War fought in 1839 at the Lubuya River near the present-day town of Hlatikulu in Eswatini. The battle followed the Voortrekker-Zulu War of 1838.

== Background ==
Zulu King Dingane's regiments were defeated when he attacked a group of 464 Voortrekkers in Ncome River that was attempting to settle in his territory. Following this, King Dingane sought to reassert his authority and compensate for territorial losses by expanding into Swazi territory north of the Phongolo River. Dingane sent regiments under Commander Masiphula Ntshangase to construct a strategic military settlement, north of the Ngwavuma River's Lubuya water screams in King Sobhuza I's territory. The Swazi, recognizing the existential threat posed by this invasion, mobilized their forces under General Mngayi Fakudze to confront the Zulu directly. The fight started when the four Zulu regiments crossed the Phongolo, camped near Mavukutfu, then advanced into the valley. Negotiations failed and the following day the Swazi military defenders met them in the valley and fought fiercely over the whole day, spreading combat along a wide area of the riverbank.

=== Battle ===
The two forces clashed in the valley of the Lubuya stream. The battle was fierce and spread over a large area in the valley between Mtsambama (right) and Mavukutfu (left) Mountains, along the banks of the Lubuya River. It took the whole day, with a number of casualties on both sides. Despite these efforts, the Zulu forces suffered substantial losses, with two of their four regiments effectively annihilated. This led to the eventual withdrawal of Zulu forces from Swazi territory. Many people died on both sides and the river ran red with blood. Some bodies were washed away by the river's flooding.

== Aftermath ==
The Swazi victory at Lubuya was a significant blow to Dingane's authority in the Zulu Kingdom and led to internal conflicts amongst the Zulu people which questioned his leadership style, having been defeated prior by the Voortrekkers. This eventually led to Dingane's overthrow by his half-brother, Mpande, in 1840.

== See also ==
- KoNtjingila
