= Nandzi Nkambule =

Wife of King Mswati II and mother of King Mbandzeni

- Born: Eswatini
- Spouse: King Mswati II
- Children: King Mbandzeni
- Father: Chief Mbandzeni Nkambule
- Relatives: Tibati Nkambule (sister)

Nandzi Nkambule (also spelt Nandi) was a Swazi royal consort and the wife of King Mswati II. She was the mother of King Mbandzeni.

Nandzi's father was Mbandzeni Nkambule, a chief of the Nkambule clan. She was the sister of Tibati Nkambule, another of King Mswati II's wives. Nandzi was put to death by Mswati II while her son Mbandzeni was still young. Following her death, Mbandzeni was raised by Tibati and later groomed by Sisile Khumalo, another of Mswati II's wives and the mother of the heir Prince Ludvonga II.

As the Queen Mother, Sisile Khumalo was later entrusted by the Liqoqo with the responsibility of identifying a successor to King Mswati II following her son Ludvonga II's death from poisoning. She selected Mbandzeni among King Mswati II's sons to rule the Kingdom, reigning from 1872 until his death in 1889.
