= Mekemeke Magongo =

Queen of Mekemeke (b.1822-d.1920)

- Queen of Mekemeke
- Born: Mekemeke Magongo c. 1822; Swaziland
- Died: c. 1920; Ekusoleni, Mekemeke, Mpumalanga, South Africa
- Spouse: King Mswati II
- Issue: Prince Ngcubuka; Princess Monile; Prince Fana
- Dynasty: House of Dlamini

Mekemeke 'LaNyandza' Magongo (c. 1822 - c. 1920) was a Swazi royal consort and the queen of Mekemeke. She was a wife of King Mswati II.

Her father was Nyandza Magongo and upon her marriage to King Mswati II around 1842, she was granted the status of umfati wekunene (right-hand wife), placing her among the senior wives of the king at the eNzingeni royal settlement, Piggs Peak.

== Establishment of Mekemeke royal village ==
During the early formation of the Swazi polity, rulers of the kingdom faced resistance from earlier inhabitants of the Eswatini region, including Emakhandzambili clans from Sotho-speaking communities. In response, Swazi kings established royal residences in strategically located areas that functioned as defensive buffer zones. These royal centres were surrounded by settlements of regiments, whose role was to provide military protection for the king and senior royal figures. During the mid-19th century, King Mswati II established a line of military outposts from east to west along the Kaap River and Komati River to prevent Bapedi groups from re-entering Swazi-controlled territory.

These outposts were Mekemeke, Emjindini (now Barberton) and Embhuleni (now Badplaas and Tjakastad area).

Around 1860, following the building of Mekemeke, Queen Mekemeke was sent from Swaziland by King Mswati II with her followers to occupy the royal outpost on the eastern portion of the Barberton district (Louw's Creek).

She came with her children, including the last-born Prince Fana Dlamini, who succeeded her in 1920.
