= Lavumisa =

Coordinates: 27°19′S 31°54′E

- Town
- Lavumisa
- Interactive map of Lavumisa
- Country: Eswatini
- District: Shiselweni
- Named after: late 1800s
- Named for: LaVumisa Ndwandwe

Lavumisa is a town located in the Shiselweni district of southern Eswatini. It was named after Queen LaVumisa Ndwandwe, a wife of King Sobhuza I.

== History ==
The area around present-day Lavumisa forms part of the wider Maputaland-Lubombo region that was occupied during the early precolonial period by Nguni-speaking community of Embo origin. Sons of Langa, an early Embo-Nguni ruler, one called Dlamini I and the other Hlubi, lived together in the area of present-day Lavumisa.

In the 19th-century during a power struggle between King Mswati II and half-brothers Malambule, Tsekwane, Fokoti, Sidubela and Ndlela (sons of LaVumisa Ndwandwe) and their subsequent expulsion from Eswatini by King Mswati II and Prince Somcuba to seek refuge with Zulu King Mpande, Tsekwane returned to Eswatini and died in Lavumisa towards the late 1800s.

== Geography ==
It is a border crossing point to the neighbouring town of Golela in South Africa. Highway MR8 and the railway cross here.

Lavumisa recorded a temperature of 47.4 °C (117.3 °F), which is the highest temperature to have ever been recorded in Eswatini.
