= Mdzimba Mountain =

Mountain range in Eswatini

- Mdimba
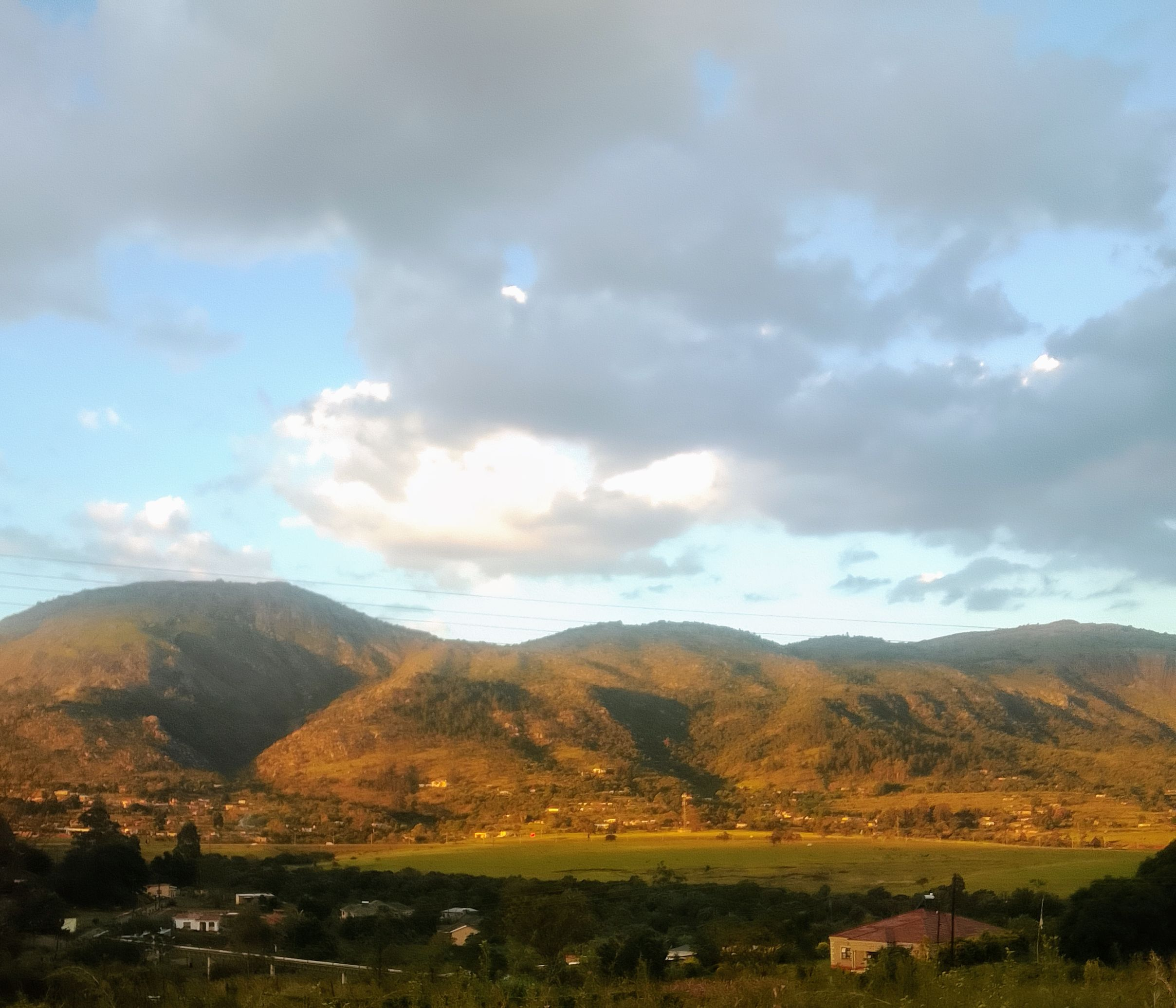
- A dawn view of Mdzimba Mountain taken from Nkhanini, Lobamba, Eswatini in 2026

Highest point
- Elevation: 1,339 m (4,393 ft)
- Coordinates: 26°23′20″S 31°15′47″E

Geography
- Location within Eswatini
- Location: Hhohho District, Eswatini

Mdzimba Mountain (also spelled Mdimba) is a mountain and hill range in northwestern Eswatini. Mount Mdzimba flanks the eastern side of the Ezulwini Valley ("Valley of Heaven"), which is the traditional residence of the royal family.

The range stands watch over Mbabane, the country's administrative capital, and overlooks Lobamba, the traditional and legislative capital. The Mdzimba contains many caves in which locals would hide during raids.

== History ==
The mountain is named after a tribe who lived in the mountains led by a chief by the name of "Dzimba". It is said that as a token of gratitude, King Sobhuza I married the chief's first daughter.

In 1826, the Swazi people retreated into the hills during an attack by the Zulus.

The Boers met with the locals of Mdzimba on 16 December 1889.

It is also the burial site of the Eswatini royal family other than Mbilaneni and is where many royal members, prominent governors and warriors are buried including Crown Prince Ludvonga II, Prince Malunge waNdvungunye, Prince Ndwandwa Dlamini, Mngayi Fakudze, his son Mbovane Fakudze, Sobhiyose Dlamini and Sandlana Zwane.

== Geography ==
The Mdzimba range is located in Eswatini's Highveld region, a cooler upland characterized by rolling granite terrain and montane grassland. The mountain has an elevation of 1,339 metres (4,393 ft) above sea level. The slopes rise above Mbabane's average elevation of approximately 1,200 metres (3,900 ft) and extend up to rocky peaks.

The Mbabane River and its tributary, the Polinjane River, carve saddles and gullies through the range, creating boulder gardens, cliffs, and quartz-like rock formations. When summer rains arrive, the grassland brightens and wildflowers bloom along the verges. During winter months (July and August), frost can occasionally be observed on the mountain at dawn.
