= Sandleni =

Coordinates: 27°02′42″S 31°24′59″E

Sandleni is an inkhundla (an administrative subdivision) of Eswatini, located in the Shiselweni District, in the south of the country. Its population as of the 2022 census was 20,210. Sandleni is located approximately 29 kilometres (18 mi) from the town of Hlatikulu. The area is characterised by beautiful mountains and forms part of the historic Mbulungwane mountain.
