= Sobhuza =

Sobhuza may refer to:

- Sobhuza I of Swaziland (ca. 1780–1839?), king (ngwenyama) of KaNgwane
- Sobhuza II of Swaziland (1899–1982), Paramount Chief and later King of Swaziland
