= Mekemeke =

Swazi royal village in South Africa

- Royal council
- Mekemeke (LoMshiyo Royal Kraal)
- Country: South Africa
- Province: Mpumalanga
- District: Ehlanzeni District Municipality
- Local municipality: Nkomazi Local Municipality
- Established: c. 1840s
- Founder: Mswati II
- Named for: Queen Mekemeke Magongo (wife of King Mswati II)
- Chieftaincy seat: Louw's Creek

Mekemeke (also spelt Emekemeke, meaning "At Mekemeke"; also called Ekusoleni, Monile, Mekemeke Royal Residence, LoMshiyo Royal Kraal or KaLoMshiyo) is a Swazi royal seat in Mpumalanga, South Africa. It is located in the Louw's Creek area, east-southeast of Barberton.

The royal village is situated near the Three Sisters Mountains (Mbayiyane Mountains), east of southeast of Barberton.

== History ==
During the early formation of the Swazi polity, rulers of the kingdom faced resistance from earlier inhabitants of the Eswatini region, including Emakhandzambili clans from Sotho-speaking communities. In response, Swazi kings established royal residences in strategically located areas that functioned as defensive buffer zones.

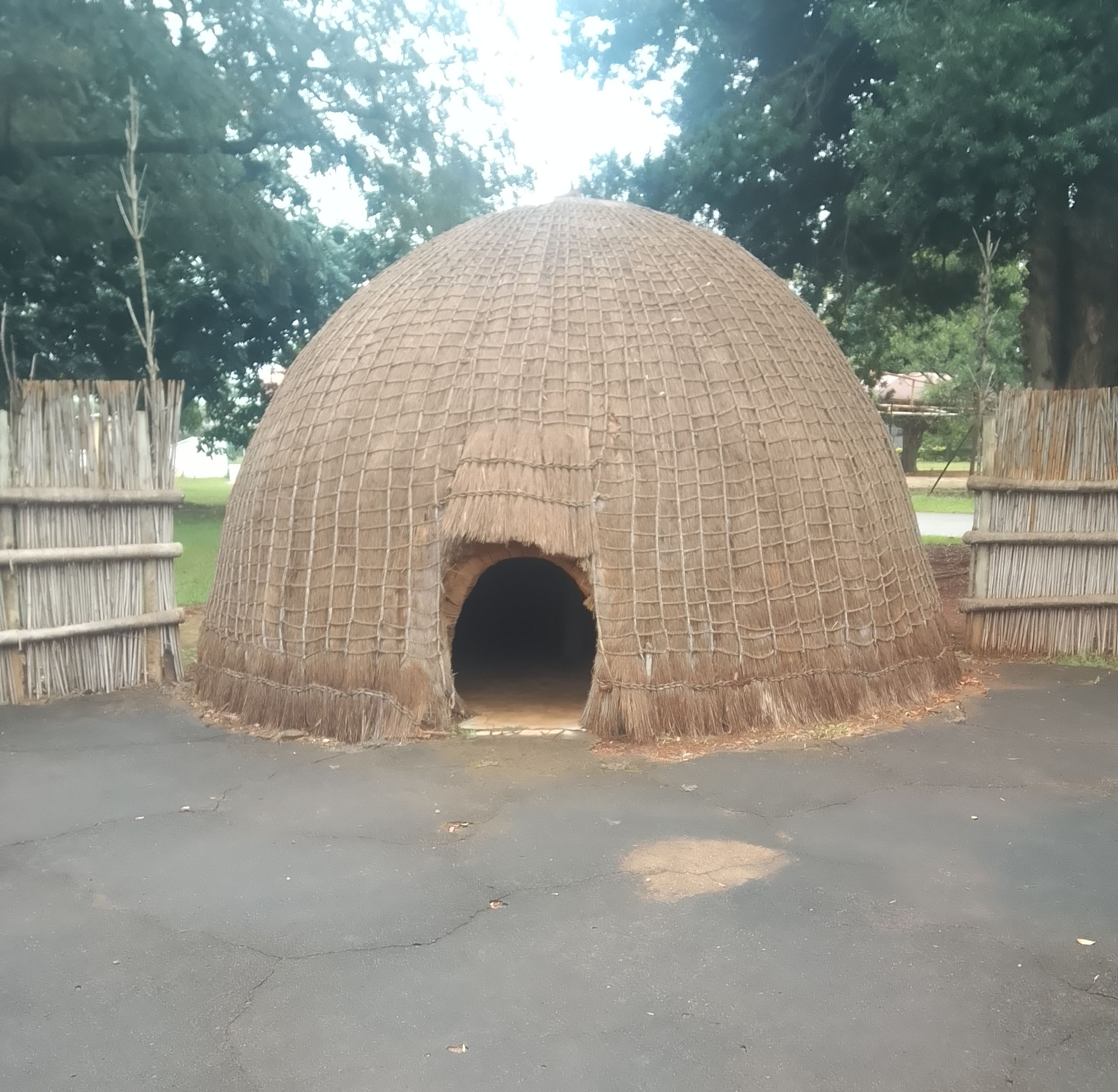
A Swazi traditional house displayed at the Eswatini National Museum, Lobamba

These royal centres were surrounded by settlements of regiments, whose role was to provide military protection for the king and senior royal figures.

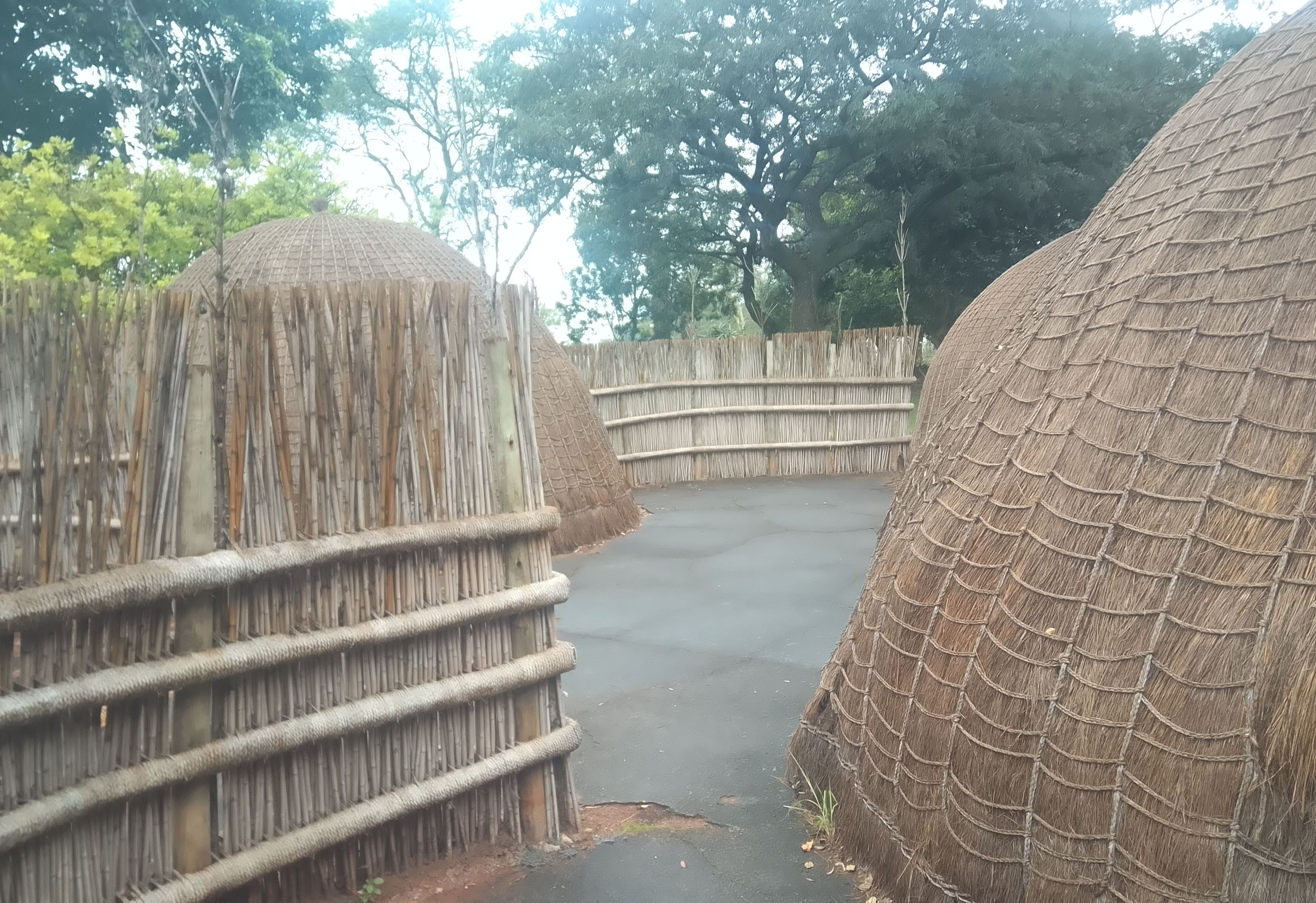

Over time, additional populations settled around these royal residences, contributing to the growth of permanent settlements. During the mid-19th century, King Mswati II established a line of military outposts from east to west along the Kaap River and Komati River to prevent Bapedi groups from re-entering Swazi-controlled territory.

At the start of his reign, King Mswati II had a lot of battles with the Sotho-speaking communities around the Graskop and Pilgrim's Rest and decided to build the military posts as part of expanding his territory.

These outposts were Mekemeke, Emjindini (now Barberton) and Embhuleni (now Badplaas and Tjakastad area).

By the late 19th century, Mekemeke had developed into a recognised chieftaincy centre under the authority of Queen Mekemeke Magongo, a wife of King Mswati II. Following the death of Queen Mekemeke around 1920, she was succeeded by her son Prince Fana Dlamini, who had been brought to the settlement as a child during the 1860s. After assuming leadership, Fana later relocated the royal village to Alberts Home, where he died around 1929.
