= Somnjalose Simelane =

Wife of King Ndvungunye

- Queen
- Born: Empangeni, Zulu Kingdom
- Died: Swaziland
- Spouse: King Ndvungunye
- Issue: King Sobhuza I
- Father: Nsibandze Simelane

Queen Somnjalose Simelane Swazi pronunciation: [somˈɲaːlose ˈsimelane]; was the wife of King Ndvungunye and the mother of King Sobhuza I. She was the younger sister/support bride of Lojiba Simelane, also a wife of King Ndvungunye, who acted as regent following Sobhuza's death in 1836.

As the wife of King Ndvungunye, Somnjalose held a prominent position within the royal household, including her son being the heir. Somnjalose and her sister Lojiba were given to King Ndvungunye to marry by the Simelane clan when they were seeking refuge. The father of the two sisters was Nsibandze Simelane, a chief of the Simelane clan.

They were born into the Ndlangamandla people, a smaller sub-clan of the Simelane lineage. Originally, the Simelane people resided in Empangeni, in the Zulu kingdom, but left due to ongoing conflicts in the region. They first settled south of the Pongola River, where their leader, Chief Mabonya (her brother), an elder son of Nsibandze, was killed in battle. Following his death, the Simelane people, led by Mancala, moved north to kaNgwane (the Swazi heartland), where they sought refuge with King Ndvungunye and were given a land called KoNtjingila.

Somnjalose's son Sobhuza I or Somhlolo was installed as the king in 1815. During the early years of King Sobhuza I’s reign, the Simelane and Mamba clans acted as a buffer against attacks from the Ndwandwe and other groups along the areas of Mahamba, Mkhondo, and Dumbe. Sobhuza I's regiments in the Shiselweni Region (KoNtjingila) were led by a warrior named Mbiko Simelane. A granddaughter of Sobhuza I married Simelane chief, Ntshingila II.

In about 1820, Sobhuza I built his new headquarters at Nakwane, near Mdzimba Mountain, called Lobamba and this is where his aunt, Queen Lojiba, ruled the kingdom as Indlovukati (Queen Mother). Queen Somnjalose was built a village between the Little Lusutfu River ("Lusushwana") and Mbabane River area, which came to be known as Ezulwini (about 4 km from Lobamba).

When Sobhuza died in 1836, Lojiba served as regent alongside Sobhuza's eldest son Prince Malambule until Mswati II came of age in 1840.

Her other residence at Zombodze became an important center of power during the reign of her son (Somhlolo). According to oral narratives, when King Sobhuza faced threats from neighboring kingdoms, including the Ndwandwe and Zulu forces, he moved from his Shiselweni residence to his mother's in Zombodze for protection.
