= Gege =

Gege may refer to:

- Gege (title), Manchu style of an imperial-born princess of an emperor
- Gege, Eswatini, town in Shiselweni, Eswatini
- Gégé (footballer) (born 1988), Cape Verdean footballer
- Gege Akutami (born 1992), Japanese manga artist
- Gege Kizubanata (born 1981), Democratic Republic of the Congo basketball player
- Gegë Marubi (1907–1984), Albanian photographer
- Gege Soriola (born 1988), Nigerian footballer
- Ghegs or Gegë, north Albanians
- Gabryela Marcelina (born 2001), known affectionately as Aby or Gege (also previously known as Aby JKT48), Indonesian singer
