= Lomvula Mndzebele =

Queen Regent of Swaziland (born before 1780 - died after 1815

Ndlovukati of Swaziland
- Reign: 1780–1815
- Predecessor: LaYaka Ndwandwe
- Successor: Lojiba Simelane
- King: Ndvungunye (until 1815); None (1815)

Queen regent of Swaziland
- Regency: 1815
- Predecessor: Ndvungunye (as king)
- Successor: Sobhuza I (as king)
- Born: before 1780
- Died: after 1815
- Spouse: Ngwane III
- Issue: Ndvungunye
- House: Dlamini (by marriage)
- Father: Kubheka Mndzebele

Lomvula Mndzebele (before 1780 – after 1815), also known as laKubekha, was the Queen Mother (Ndlovukati) of Swaziland in 1780–1815 and the Queen Regent of Swaziland briefly in 1815 after the death of Ndvungunye until Sobhuza I became the king of Swaziland.

She was the consort of Ngwane III, and the mother of king Ndvungunye. Her son became king in 1780. She became regent after the death of her son in 1815. She reigned until her grandson Sobhuza I could be installed as king.

Regnal titles
Preceded by Ndvungunye	Queen Regent of Swaziland; 1815	Succeeded by Sobhuza I
