= Lindiwe Dlamini =

Lindiwe Dlamini may refer to:

- Princess Lindiwe
- Lindiwe Dlamini (politician, born 1965)
