= Gelane Zwane =

President of the Senate of Eswatini
- In office 2006 – 23 October 2018

Deputy President of the Senate of Eswatini
- In office 2003–2006

Acting Chief (Inkhosatana) of KoNtjingila Royal Kraal

Personal details
- Born: 1952 (age 73–74)
- Profession: Politician, traditionalist

Chief Gelane Zwane (born 1952) is a politician and traditionalist from Eswatini.

She was born in 1952. She was Deputy President of the Senate from 2003 until 2006 when she was elected President of the Senate. She served as President of the Senate until 23 October 2018.

She was acting chief (Inkhosatana)of KoNtjingila Royal Kraal in the Shiselweni region until 2022.
