= Schulzendal =

- Location within Mpumalanga Location within South Africa
- Coordinates: 25.749°S 31.540°E
- Country: South Africa
- Province: Mpumalanga
- District: Ehlanzeni
- Municipality: Nkomazi

Area
  - Total: 2.74 km^{2} (1.06 sq mi)

Population (2001)
  - Total: 3,659
  - Density: 1,340/km^{2} (3,460/sq mi)
- Time zone: UTC+2 (SAST)
- PO box: 1336

Schulzendal is a town in Ehlanzeni District Municipality in the Mpumalanga province of South Africa, 31 km south-east of Kaapmuiden.
