= Ntjanini =

Village in Shiselweni, Eswatini

Ntjanini is a small village set in a valley in the south of Eswatini in the Shiselweni District. The village is situated 120 km from Manzini and 145 km from Mbabane. The closest town to Ntjanini is Nhlangano (60 km), which is the administrative town for the Shiselweni District.

It names among the oldest settlements in Eswatini, Ntjanini is a settlement on Swazi National Land (SNL) managed under the chieftaincy of Maweni, Mpini and kaLiba (Lusitini). The main chiefdom of the area is kaMhawu, meaning the place of Mhawu who was the first chief to settle in this place with his people in the early 1880s; after the kaLiba (Lusitini) people moved to Kwa-Zulu. The name Ntjanini is derived from the Ntjanini River which runs through the village and between the surrounding mountains. Although Ntjanini River is small, it is given because it never runs dry. The siSwati word Ntjanini means “when does it dry out?”.

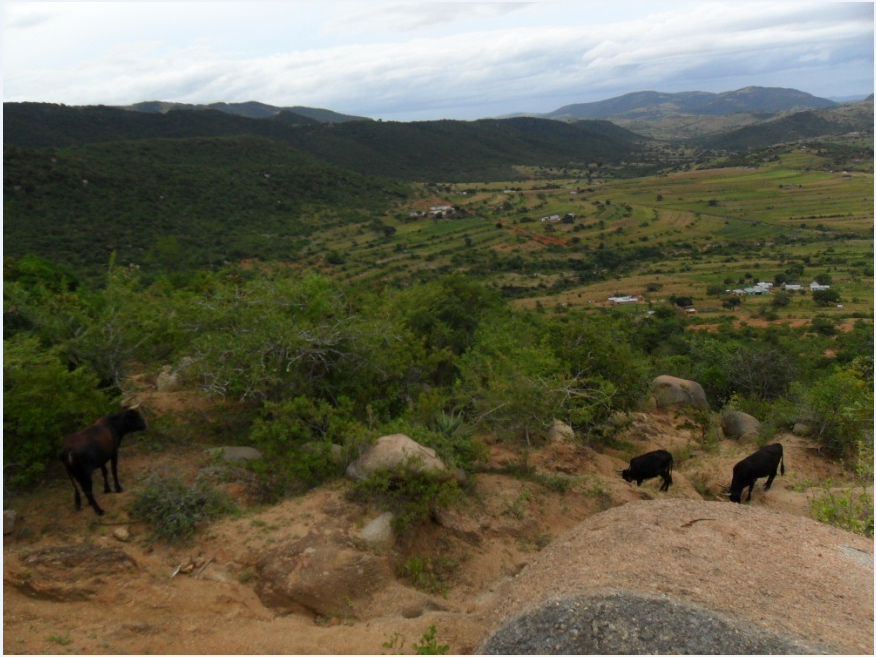
Cattle grazing on Madladlamela hill, at the foot of the hill are planting fields

== Population and Culture ==
Ntjanini is part of Ngudzeni Nkhundla which comprises about 500 households, with 1200 school going children and 200 preschoolers. The inhabitants of Ntjanini comprise 57 households. The language spoken is siSwati and the younger inhabitants learn English as a second language in school. The population largely consists of the elderly and school going children as a significant portion of the youth migrate to the cities as well as to the neighbouring South Africa to seek employment. The working class of Ntjanini works and lives in the cities; mostly Mbabane (the capital), Manzini and Matsapha[1].

== Development of Ntjanini ==
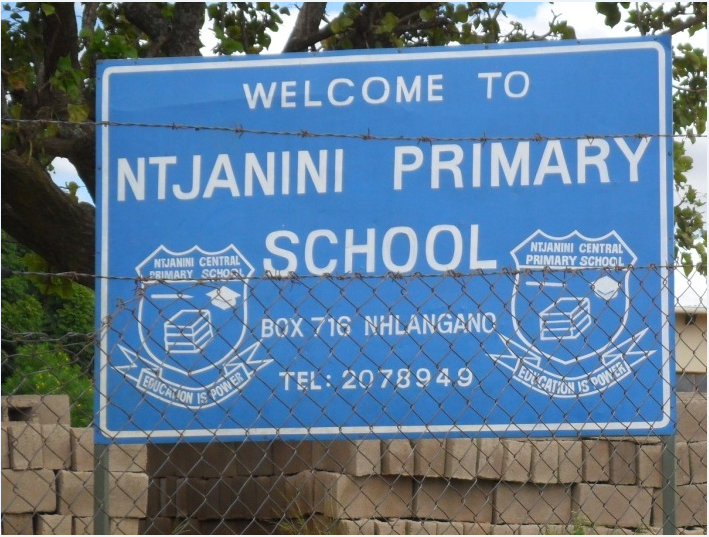
Sign close to the school entrance

Development in Ntjanini was a result of one man Reverend Jonathan L Shongwe who was converted to Christianity by a missionary based at Franson Christian Bible College. At the time of his conversion, he was the subject of Chief Bhokweni Mamba (Inkhosi yaka-Mamba) the chief of the Mamba clan, usually referred to as King of the Mamba clan. Chief Bhokweni chased Jonathan away from his chiefdom because he did not trust him as his wives attended church services at Rev. Jonathan's church. The chief suspected that Jonathan would fall in love with his wives. As a result, Jonathan sought refuge from Chief Mhawu who welcomed him and commissioned his wives and daughters in law to provide Reverend Jonathan with thatch grass for the church building that also served as a school. The missionaries assisted the community in the development of the school to provide primary education. The school is now considered a government school. It has advanced from a primary school to a high school providing education up to IGCSE level (Form 5).

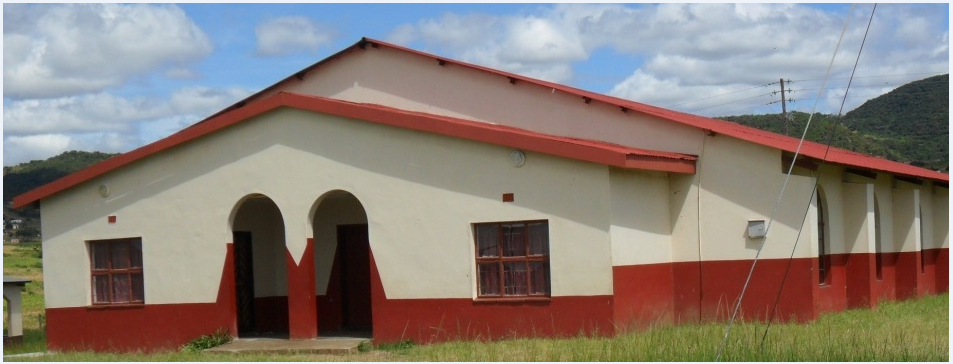
Church Building built by the Ntjanini Community

The school with a student population of 1200 also services nearby communities including ka-Mamba chiefdom, ka-Lusitini community, Mpini community, Nyatsini chiefdom and other communities under Ngudzeni Inkhundla Centre. Successful students proceed to study in the University of Swaziland and other colleges; while others proceed to study in South African colleges and universities. It is the graduates of the community that have participated in further developments of the area. In addition to the school, the community has a clinic providing primary health care not only to Ntjanini but also to surrounding communities. The first church in Ntjanini was built in (1935); over time this building deteriorated and has since been replaced with a newer and larger church building that was built by the community.

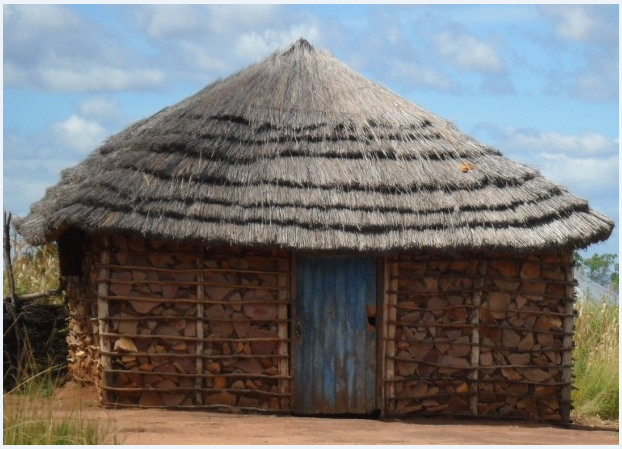
Traditional grass hut

The involvement of the Peace Corps of the United States has also had a positive role in contributing to community development. The first Peace Corps volunteers came to Ntjanini in 1969. They worked as teachers and have since been involved in community projects such as vegetable gardening and social clubs to help young boys and girls engage positively, particularly in the fight against the HIV/AIDS pandemic faced by the country. Other not-for-profit organisations such as World Vision International have also recently become much involved in the development of Ntjanini under the Ngudzeni Area Development Programmes.

Development in Ntjanini has also been marked by a transition from the traditional mud and grass huts to modern brick and mortar buildings as well as an increased availability of electricity and mobile connectivity. Even though such structures can still be seen in the community, the transition has been remarkable, the church building is a representation of this transition.

== Mountains and Rivers of Ntjanini ==
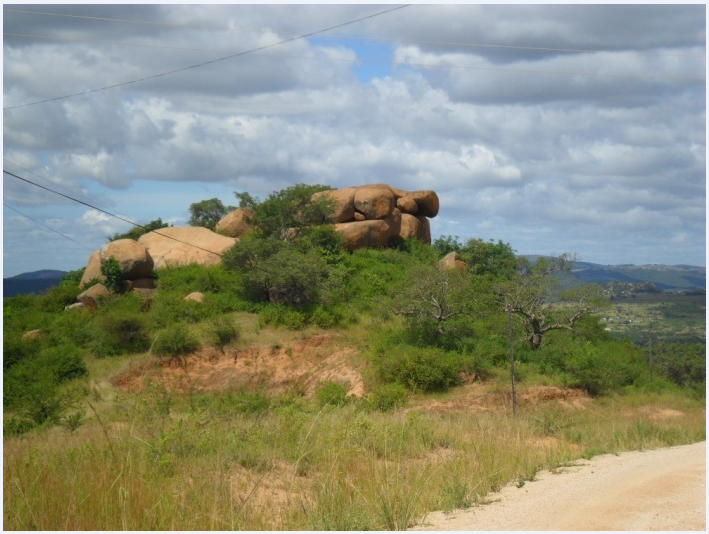
Sandlana Rock Formation, marks the entry into Ntjanini area

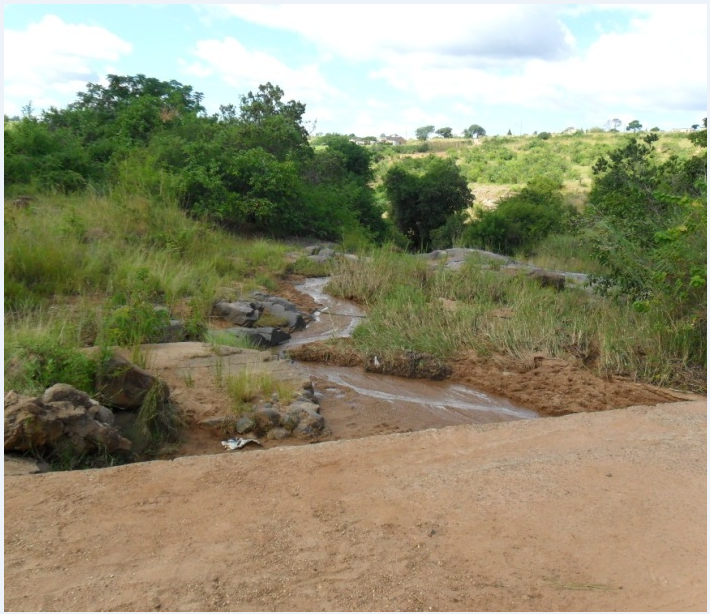
Ndololwane River

Ntjanini is surrounded by 2 mountain ranges, Ngudzeni and Madladlamela, that reaches it pinnacle at Luqolweni mountain. Two rivers run through the valley as a water source for the people of Ntjanini. The larger one is Ntjanini and the smaller one is Ndololwane, a stream which also runs throughout the year without drying out. A notable rock formation called Sandlana (meaning small hand) shows the traveler that they have arrived at Ntjanini area[1].

== Economy ==
As with most communities on SNL in Swaziland, Ntjanini is a farming community with the majority of the inhabitants living on subsistence farming practices. SNL is one of the land tenure systems in Swaziland whereby land is managed under Chiefdoms and residents do pay for use of the land. The second tenure system is Title Deed Land where the owner purchases the land and is given a title deed as proof of ownership. Maize is planted by all families as this forms the staple food in Swaziland. Many families keep cattle and goats that graze on the mountains surrounding Ntjanini. A colliery is located in Maloma 18 km away from Ntjanini school. Those working in the cities provide much needed farm inputs in the form of seeds, fertilisers and monies for tractor hire services to those living in the village since there is very little income generated by the farming activities in the area[1].
