= Mbilaneni =

Royal burial site in Eswatini

- Type: Swazi royal burial site
- Location: Shiselweni District, Eswatini
- Nearest city: Nhlangano

Site notes
- Governing body: Traditional authorities
- Owner: Kingdom of Eswatini

Mbilaneni is a historical site in Eswatini (formerly Swaziland), located approximately 8 kilometres south of the modern town of Nhlangano in the Shiselweni District. It is a royal burial ground of the Swazi monarchy.

The mountainous site is sometimes referred to locally as "Mbilaneni I" to distinguish it from Mlokotfwa Hill ("Mbilaneni II"), where King Ndvungunye was interred after being struck by lightning in 1815 and the Mdzimba Mountain where Prince Ludvonga was buried.

== Description ==
Mbilaneni is the burial place of several prominent Swazi kings, including Ngwane III, Sobhuza I, Mswati II, and Sobhuza II.

Royal burials at Mbilaneni are conducted with strict traditional rules. Bodies are initially placed in caves before being moved to the hillside under cover of night. The Mdluli clan serves as the primary custodians of the Mbilaneni royal graves. Historically, the Mkhaliphi clan were earlier custodians but lost this role due to negligence during a grass fire.

A nephew of Queen Somnjalose Simelane named Khani Simelane married Mbilini Mdluli and their son, Senzenjani Mdluli (died 1944), continued guarding Mbilaneni.

In July 2021, Mbilaneni made the news after King Mswati III's ritual cows, a herd of 30, fled into the forest at night while the royal family was preparing for a royal ritual ceremony at Mbilaneni, requiring the deployment of military personnel to recover them quickly.
