= John Wardle Houlton =

Sir John Wardle Houlton was a British civil servant in the Foreign Office who emigrated to Swaziland and served as the President of the Senate from 1967 to 1973.

Houlton was born in 1892. His family was from Middlesex and he was educated at the Perse School, and Christ's College, Cambridge. He worked in the Indian Civil Service, in the government of Bihar, from 1933.

Houlton emigrated to South Africa in 1950, and then to Swaziland, where he was made a legal secretary. In 1965, he became speaker of the Legislative Council of Swaziland, and two years later he became Speaker of the Senate. He retired from that position in May 1973.

Houlton was the author of Bihar, the Heart of India (1949). For years he wrote editorials in the Times of Swaziland. He died on 9 November 1973.
