= Sigwe =

Inkhundla of Eswatini

Coordinates: 27°03′47″S 31°40′12″E

Sigwe is an inkhundla of Eswatini, located in the Shiselweni District. Its population as of the 2007 census was 11,776.
