= Matsanjeni South =

Coordinates: 27.2397°S 31.7198°E

Matsanjeni South is an inkhundla of Eswatini, located in the Shiselweni District. Its population as of the 2007 census was 16,238.
