= Heyshope Dam =

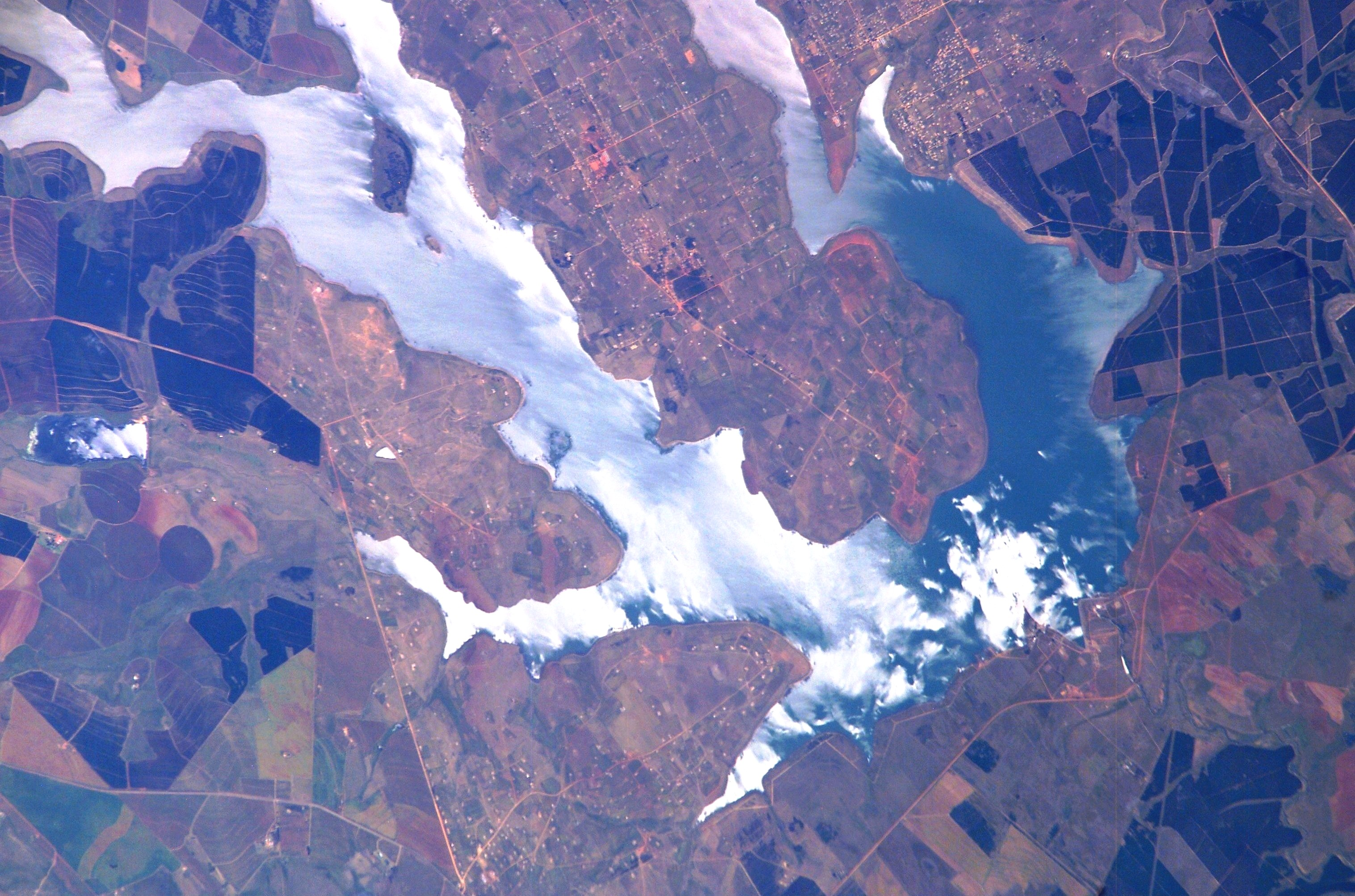
- Interactive map of Heyshope Dam
- Official name: Heyshope Dam
- Location: Mpumalanga, South Africa
- Coordinates: 27°1′37″S 30°30′0″E
- Opening date: 1986
- Operators: Department of Water Affairs and Forestry

Dam and spillways
- Type of dam: zoned earth-fill
- Impounds: Assegaai River
- Height: 28.5 m
- Length: 1 030 m

Reservoir
- Creates: Heyshope Dam Reservoir
- Total capacity: 453 440 m³
- Catchment area: 1120 km^{2}
- Surface area: 5 023.8 ha

Heyshope Dam is a zoned earth-fill type dam located on the Assegaai River, Mpumalanga, South Africa. It was established in 1986. The main purpose for the dam being built was to service communities around the Vaal triangle of the old Transvaal. The hazard potential of the dam construction has been ranked high (3).

== See also ==
- List of reservoirs and dams in South Africa
- List of rivers of South Africa
