= Hlatikulu =

Town in Shiselweni, southern Eswatini

- Town
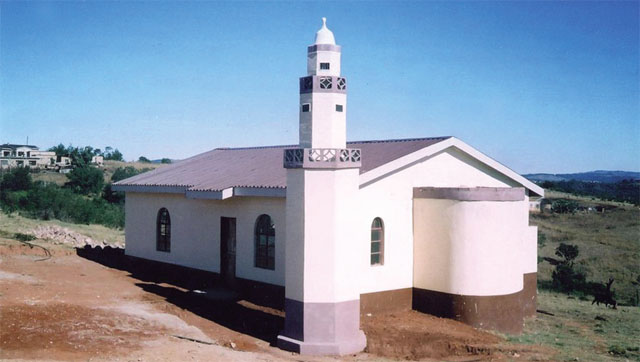

- Location within Eswatini
- Coordinates: 26°58′26.0″S 31°19′31.6″E
- Country: Eswatini
- Region: Shiselweni Region
- Elevation: 1,210 m (3,970 ft)

Population (2013)
  - Total: 2,800

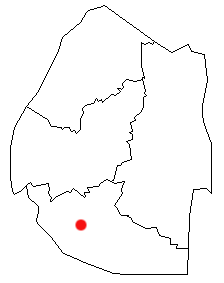
Location of Hlatikulu in Eswatini

Hlatikulu is a town located in the Shiselweni district of southern Eswatini.

== Geography ==
Hlatikulu is situated above the Grand Valley Estate in the valley of the Mkhondvo River, south of the MR9 trunk road, which leads to Nkwene and Manzini.The main street in Hlatikulu is The Assegai Inn street. Standing at over 1,210 metres (3,970 ft) above sea level it has the highest altitude in Ewsatini and hence is also the coldest town in Eswatini.

== Culture ==
The town is home to the Hlathikhulu Government Hospital, and the Free Evangelical Assembles Hlathikhulu and Christ the King Parish churches. In the north of the settlement is the Mkhondvo High School.
