= Mtsambama =

Administrative subdivision in Eswatini

Coordinates: 26°57′52″S 31°23′48″E

Mtsambama is an inkhundla of Eswatini, located in the Shiselweni District. Its population as of the 2007 census was 18,900. The chiefdoms or imiphakatsi falling under Mtsambama are KaMbhoke, Bhanganoma, Ekwendzeni, Magele and Gwegwe.
