= Maseyisini =

Inkhundla of Shiselweni District, Eswatini

Coordinates: 27°06′39″S 31°08′52″E

Maseyisini is an inkhundla of Eswatini, located in the Shiselweni District. Its population as of the 2007 census was 27,967.
