= Shiselweni II =

Coordinates: 27°07′S 31°12′E

Shiselweni II (sometimes called Mbangweni) is an inkhundla, or administrative subdivision, of Eswatini, located in the Shiselweni District. Its population as of the 2007 census was 20,067.
