= LaYaka Ndwandwe =

18th-century queen regent of Swaziland

Ndlovukati of Swaziland
- Reign: 1745–1780
- Successor: Lomvula Mndzebele
- King: Ngwane III (until 1780); None (1780)

Queen regent of Swaziland
- Regency: 1780
- Predecessor: Ngwane III (as king)
- Successor: Ndvungunye (as king)
- Born: before 1745; Ndwandwe Kingdom
- Died: after 1780; Swaziland
- Spouse: King Dlamini III
- Issue: King Ngwane III
- House: Dlamini (by marriage)
- Father: Yaka Ndwandwe

LaYaka Ndwandwe (before 1745 – after 1780) was the oldest known Ndlovukati and the Queen Regent of Swaziland briefly in 1780 after the death of King Ngwane III until Ndvungunye became the king of Swaziland.

She was the spouse of King Dlamini III and the mother of Ngwane III. She became regent after the death of her son Ngwane III in 1780, until his successor, her grandson Ndvungunye, could be installed as king.

Regnal titles
Preceded by Ngwane III	Queen Regent of Swaziland; 1780	Succeeded by Ndvungunye
