= Somntongo =

Coordinates: 27°18′06″S 31°53′10″E

Somntongo is an inkhundla of Eswatini, located in the Shiselweni District. Its population as of the 2007 census was 5,457.
