= List of presidents of the Senate of Eswatini =

The president of the Senate of Eswatini is the presiding officer of the Senate of Eswatini.

The president is elected by the Senate, either among its own members (other than ministers) or from among persons who are not members.

Name	Entered office	Left office	Notes
Sir John Wardle Houlton	1967	1973	
In abeyance	1973	1980	
Elias M. Hlope	1980	1984	
Jacob P. Mavimbela	1984	1994	
Lawrence Mfana Mncina	1994	1998	
Muntu P. N. Mswane	1998	2003	
Mathendele Dlamini	2003	2006	
Princess Gelane Zwane	2006	October 2018	
Lindiwe Dlamini	October 2018	Present	
