= Mbekelweni =

- Royal village
- Country: Eswatini
- Region: Manzini Region
- Royal capital: from c. 1875 to 1889
- Founded by: King Mbandzeni
- Royal residence: King Mbandzeni

Mbekelweni is a royal village in the Manzini Region of Eswatini that served as the principal royal residence of King Mbandzeni (r. 1875–1889). This is the place where he administered the Kingdom of Eswatini during the late nineteenth century.

King Mbandzeni established Mbekelweni when he became King in 1875 following the death of his father King Mswati II. The royal residence was surrounded by over 300 huts where the King's warriors and close family members resided.

This is the area where Sandlane Zwane was born in 1810 and where Mbandzeni later ruled Swaziland.
