= Shiselweni I =

Inkhundla of Swaziland

Coordinates: 27°07′S 31°12′E

Shiselweni I is an inkhundla of Eswatini, located in the Shiselweni District. Its population as of the 2007 census was 12,823.
