= Ngudzeni =

Coordinates: 27°02′09″S 31°33′04″E

Ngudzeni is an inkhundla of Eswatini, located in the Shiselweni District. Its population as of the 2007 census was 8.056. Ngudzeni is also a community currently ruled by the late King Maja the Second. Ngudzeni is located between Nhlangano Town and Big Bend. Ngudzeni Community is named after Ingudze mountain, a mountain with a unique and diverse ecosystem which has become a source off wood and grazing ground for people of the community
