= Lindiwe Dlamini (politician, born 1965) =

Eswatini politician (born 1965)

Lindiwe Dlamini (born 1965) is a politician from Eswatini who is serving as President of the Senate of Eswatini. She also served as Minister of Public Works and Transport.
