= Assegaai River =

Assegaai River Mkhondvo River
- Location within South Africa

Location
- Country: South Africa
- Province: Mpumalanga

Physical characteristics
- Mouth
  - location: near Sidvokodvo, Manzini, Swaziland
  - coordinates: 27.2075°S 30.137778°E

Assegaai River, originates north of Wakkerstroom, Mpumalanga, South Africa, and runs into the Heyshope Dam, southeast of Piet Retief. When it enters Eswatini it is known as the Mkhondvo River and it cuts through the mountains forming the Mahamba Gorge. In Eswatini it flows generally northeastward and eventually into the Usutu River.

Tributaries of the Assegaai include the Ngulane River, the Anysspruit, the Boesmanspruit, and the Klein Assegaai River.

== See also ==
- List of rivers of South Africa
- List of reservoirs and dams in South Africa
