= Gege, Eswatini =

Coordinates: 26°57′S 31°01′E

Gege is a town in the Shiselweni district of southern Eswatini.

It is near the Bothashoop border crossing point towards Piet Retief in South Africa. It is on the MR13 road.
