= Nkwene =

Settlement in Eswatini

Coordinates: 26°53′52″S 31°14′59″E

Nkwene is an inkhundla of Eswatini, located in the Shiselweni District. Its population as of the 2007 census was 7,167.
