= Louw's Creek =

Town and river tributary in South Africa

Louw's Creek Low’s Creek, Mantibovu

Location
- Country: South Africa

Physical characteristics
- Mouth: Cape River
  - coordinates: 25°35′23″S 31°18′31″E

Louw's Creek (also known as Low’s Creek and historically as Mantibovu, meaning "red or brown water" in Siswati) is a small town in Mpumalanga, South Africa and a tributary of the Cape River. The town developed along the creek which flows northwards near the border with Eswatini.

The name "Low's Creek" is derived from David Ireland Low, a Scottish prospector who discovered a gold-bearing reef in the area. Before this period, the area was known in Siswati as "Mantibovu" (red water) to commemorate a battle around 1850 when the Swazi people drove the Mbayi people from the area, during which the creek reportedly ran red with blood.

== History ==
It was named after David Ireland Low. In 1895, Low’s Creek became one of the stations on the Barberton to Kaapmuiden railway line, drawing settlers to the agricultural community. The area surrounding the creek was farmed and developed, including the establishment of Low’s Creek Farm, which was granted to Jack Dreyer, a member of the secret services during the South African War (1899–1902). Dreyer operated the Dreyer Hotel, later renamed the Low’s Creek Hotel, after the completion of the main road between Witwatersrand and Komatipoort.

Earlier, the creek and its surroundings were inhabited by Bapedi communities, notably the Mbayi people. Swazi regiments under King Mswati II drove them from the area and established a military post called Mekemeke to safeguard land.
