= Kaapmuiden =

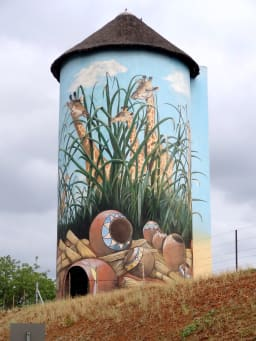

- Location within Mpumalanga Location within South Africa
- Coordinates: 25.532°S 31.333°E
- Country: South Africa
- Province: Mpumalanga
- District: Ehlanzeni
- Municipality: Nkomazi

Area
  - Total: 0.18 km^{2} (0.069 sq mi)

Population (2011)
  - Total: 270
  - Density: 1,500/km^{2} (3,900/sq mi)

Racial makeup (2011)
  - Black African: 98.5%
  - Coloured: 0.7%
  - White: 0.7%

First languages (2011)
  - Swazi: 88.5%
  - Other: 11.5%
- Time zone: UTC+2 (SAST)
- PO box: 1295
- Area code: 013

Kaapmuiden (Cape Mouth) is a small farming town situated at the confluence of the Kaap and Crocodile Rivers in Mpumalanga, South Africa. The town lies just off the N4 national highway and is marked by a large abandoned silo visible from the road. The silo has since been repainted to add to tourism appeal. The farms in the region produce sugarcane, subtropical fruit and vegetables. The town began as a junction on the Netherlands-South African Railway Company (NZASM)'s Pretoria - Delagoa Bay railway line.

The town underwent some development due to the Sasol pipeline and construction and upgrading of the national highway. The Nkomazi Tollgate was subsequently built on the N4 national route (Maputo Corridor) on the eastern outskirts of the town.

== Selati Railway ==
In June 1890, Eugene, the younger of the Barons Oppenheim, sought to obtain a concession from the Government of the Zuid-Afrikaansche Republiek to construct a railway line to the Murchison Range goldfields along the Ga-Selati River. Work on the construction of the Selati Railway in the Transvaal Lowveld began early in 1893, with the line branching off from the Pretoria-Delagoa Bay mainline at a junction near Komatipoort.

The line was extended via Gravelotte and Tzaneen to a junction at Soekmekaar, where it met the line from Pietersburg to Messina in 1912. In 1963, the part of the line through the southern part of the Kruger National Park, from the junction near Komatipoort, was abandoned and replaced by a new line from the present junction near Kaapmuiden.
