= Malambule =

Half-brother of King Mswati II and former regent of Eswatini

Prince Malambule
- Born: Swaziland
- Died: Swaziland
- Children: Princess Lozinga
- Parents: King Sobhuza I (father); Queen LaVumisa Ndwandwe (mother)
- Relatives: King Mswati II (half-brother)

Prince Malambule Dlamini was a Swazi prince and the senior son of King Sobhuza I with Queen LaVumisa Ndwandwe. He served as regent of Eswatini after Sobhuza I's death in 1836, governing alongside Queen Lojiba Simelane until King Mswati II came of age in 1840. He was a half-brother to King Mswati II and played a significant role during the early years of his reign.

Both Malambule’s mother and King Mswati II's mother, Queen Tsandzile Ndwandwe, were from the Ndwandwe royal house of King Zwide kaLanga. LaVumisa was the daughter of Prince Vumisa, a brother of King Zwide, while Tsandzile was Zwide's own daughter.

Their marriages to King Sobhuza were arranged to end the conflict between King Zwide and King Sobhuza. It was believed that becoming blood relatives would prevent further hostilities. Additionally, Prince Pholile, a daughter of King Sobhuza, was given in marriage to King Zwide.

== Conflict with Mswati II and exile ==
When Mswati reached maturity and was ready to assume authority, Malambule refused to relinquish power, leading to conflict. Some accounts suggest that Mswati uncovered a plot by Malambule to kill him, while others claim Malambule had grown too powerful and was unwilling to step aside. Others suggest that upon handing over power, Malambule defiantly took a large number of royal cattle, known as Ludlambedlu.

During Sobhuza’s illness, LaVumisa had attempted to persuade him to consider Malambule as his successor, arguing that a child-king, referring to the young Mswati II, could bring instability in Swaziland. Malambule, already a grown man, was seen as a strong candidate. Sobhuza initially agreed but later changed his mind upon recovering, ultimately naming Mswati II -Tsandzile's son as heir.

The power struggle between the two brothers ended with Malambule's expulsion from the royal family. After his defeat, he fled in 1847 with his brothers, Princes Tsekwane, Fokoti, Sidubela, and Ndlela, seeking refuge with Zulu King Mpande. While in Zululand, Malambule launched several unsuccessful attacks on Mswati, raiding his cattle. However, he later fell out with Mpande and returned to Swaziland.

== Return from exile ==
Upon their return, Malambule and his brothers sought refuge with the Kunene people near Mahamba. Mswati II learned of their presence there and sent 1,200 warriors to punish the Kunene for harbouring Malambule. The Kunene fled and sought refuge at the nearby Methodist mission station, established in 1844 by James Allison and Richard Giddy. During a Sunday service attended by hundreds, the Swazi regiments attacked the mission, killing dozens, including women and children. However, the missionaries were spared, as Mswati had warned against harming them.

Following the massacre, the surrounding area was largely abandoned, and one of the mission's outstations was burned down. Feeling unsafe, the missionaries left Swaziland with several converts in September 1846, relocating to Pietermaritzburg, KwaZulu-Natal, South Africa. For decades afterward, Swaziland remained closed to missionaries. It was only after King Mbandzeni took the throne in 1875 that churches were allowed to return.
