= Lojiba Simelane =

Wife of King Ndvungunye

Ndlovukati of Swaziland
- Reign: 1815–1840
- Predecessor: Lomvula Mndzebele
- Successor: Tsandzile Ndwandwe
- King: Sobhuza I (until 1836); None (since 1836)

Queen regent of Swaziland
- Regency: 1836–1840
- Predecessor: Sobhuza I (as king)
- Successor: Mswati II (as king)
- Born: Empangeni, Zulu Kingdom
- Died: after 1840; Swaziland
- Spouse: King Ndvungunye
- Issue: Sononde
- House: Dlamini (by marriage)
- Father: Nsibandze Simelane

Queen Lojiba Simelane was one of the wives of King Ndvungunye and the elder sister of Ndvungunye's inhlanti ("co-wife") Somnjalose Simelane, the mother of King Sobhuza I. Lojiba was the 3rd known Ndlovukati and the Queen Regent of Swaziland from 1836 after the death of Sobhuza I until 1840 when King Mswati II became the king.

Lojiba and Somnjalose were given in marriage to King Ndvungunye by the Simelane clan when the clan sought refuge in his kingdom. Their father was Nsibandze Simelane.

The sisters were born into the Ndlangamandla people, a smaller sub-clan within the larger Simelane lineage. Lojiba, also known as LaNsibandze, was likely older to Somnjalose, her inhlanti. Historically, the Simelane clan resided in Empangeni, in the Zulu Kingdom, but migrated due to ongoing regional conflicts. Initially, they settled south of the Pongola River, where the Simalane chief, Mabonya (their brother), a son of the late Chief Nsibandze Simelane, was killed in battle. After his death, leadership passed to Mabonga's brother Mancala, who guided the clan north to kaNgwane (the Swazi heartland) in search of refuge under King Ndvungunye.

During the early years of King Sobhuza I’s reign, the Simelane and Mamba clans served as Swazi protective buffers against attacks from the Ndwandwe and other hostile groups in the areas of Mahamba, Mkhondo, and Dumbe. In the Shiselweni region, Sobhuza I's regiments, stationed at KoNtjingila, were led by the warrior Mbiko Simelane. Later, a granddaughter of Sobhuza I married Simelane chief Ntshingila II, further strengthening ties between the royal family and the Simelane clan.

In about 1820, Sobhuza I built his new headquarters at Nakwane, near Mdzimba Mountain, called Lobamba and this is where his aunt, Queen Lojiba, ruled the kingdom as Indlovukati (Queen Mother). Queen Somnjalose was built a village between the Little Lusutfu River ("Lusushwana") and Mbabane River area, which came to be known as Ezulwini (about 4km from Lobamba).

When Sobhuza I died in 1836, Lojiba Simelane assumed the role of regent, governing alongside Sobhuza's eldest son, Prince Malambule, until Mswati II came of age and ascended the throne in 1840.

== Successions ==
Regnal titles
| Preceded by Sobhuza I | Queen Regent of Swaziland; 1836–1840 | Succeeded by Mswati II |
