= Ngwane III =

King of Swaziland from 1745 to 1780

King of Swaziland
- Reign: 1745 – 1780
- Coronation: c. 1745
- Predecessor: Dlamini III
- Successor: Ndvungunye
- Queen Mother: LaYaka Ndwandwe
- Born: early 1700s Nkhanini, Lebombo Mountains
- Died: 1780; Shiselweni
- Burial: Mbilaneni
- Issue: Ndinisa; Liba; Ndvungunye
- House: House of Dlamini
- Father: Dlamini III
- Mother: LaYaka Ndwandwe

Ngwane III was King of kaNgwane (now Kingdom of Eswatini) from 1745 to 1780. He is considered to be the first King of modern Eswatini. For his name the people were called bakaNgwane and the country was called kaNgwane or lakaNgwane.

Ngwane was the son of Dlamini III and Queen LaYaka Ndwandwe. He was born at an area called Nkanini on the Lebombo Mountains. Dlamini was succeeded by Ngwane III his son with Queen LaYaka Ndwandwe. He took over the Dlamini chieftaincy and established settlements south of the Pongola River, later moving them to the north of the river banks. This makes Ngwane and his followers the founders of modern Swaziland. Ngwane ruled his Kingdom from the south east of Swaziland in the present Shiselweni district and his headquarters were called Zombodze at the foot of the Mhlosheni hills. It was at Zombodze that the Nguni ceremony incwala was celebrated for the first time.

== Kingship ==
Ngwane III is an important figure in the history of Eswatini, of which he is regarded as the first king. He succeeded his father Dlamini III as chief of the early Swazi who had settled near the Pongola River and Lubombo Mountains. He managed to conquer land south of the Pongola River. He wasn't able to hold this land, but it is this land which is still seen as an important part of modern Swaziland. Later he settled on the northern side of the Pongola and subsequently moving his royal capital to Zombodze, within the borders of present-day Eswatini. Zombodze became the heartland of the Ngwane kingdom, and incwala, the Nguni ceremony of First Fruits was celebrated for the first time there. Ngwane thus became the eponym of his country and his people. The country became known as kaNgwane, means "the country of place of Ngwane" and his people as bakaNgwane. This name is still used today and the Swazi people use this name to refer to themselves as a people. Ngwane III reigned until 1780 when his son, Ndvungunye, became King after a regency of Queen LaYaka Ndwandwe.

== See also ==
- List of kings of Swaziland

Regnal titles
Preceded by Dlamini III	King of Eswatini; 1745–1780	Succeeded by LaYaka Ndwandwe (Queen Regent)
