= Ndvungunye =

King of Swaziland
- Reign: 1780 – 1815
- Coronation: 1780
- Predecessor: Ngwane III
- Successor: Sobhuza I
- Queen Mother: Lomvula Mndzebele
- Born: c. 1760
- Died: 1815 (aged 54-55)
- Burial: Emakhosini
- Issue: Sobhuza I; Malunge; Cebisa; Magwegwe; Phangodze; Ndlovu; Sobandla waNdvungunye
- House: House of Dlamini
- Father: Ngwane III
- Mother: Lomvula Mndzebele

Ndvungunye (also known as Zikodze, Zwane, Mavuso II) was King of Swaziland from 1780 until his death in 1815 after succeeding his father, King Ngwane III following a very brief regency of Ndlovukati LaYaka Ndwandwe. Very little has been recorded of the quality of leadership under his reign.

Ndvungunye built his residence or Sigodlo near Mhlosheni on feet of the eMhlosheni hills in Shiselweni, the south east of modern Swaziland near Zombodze, where his father Ngwane had settled during his reign. His rule thus indicated a period of limited expansion and consolidation which is overshadowed by that of his son King Sobhuza I. The NShiselweni settlements established under his reign which he placed under the guardianship of his chief Sukumbili Mbokane would not however provide a solid foundation for the future Swazi state as indicated by attacks after his death on Sobhuza by Ndwandwe chiefs.

Ndvungunye died around 1815 after being struck by lightning. He died before he could dance his first incwala. Ndvungunye was married to the two KoNtjingila sisters, Lojiba Simelane and Somnjalose Simelane. It was with the latter that he had his son Sobhuza I. Lojiba however became Queen mother as she was a senior sister to Somnjalose. Sobhuza I became the king in 1815 after the regency of Queen Lomvula Mndzebele.

== Biography ==
Ingwenyama Ndvungunye was born in about 1760 as a son of Ngwane III and Inkhosikati Lomvula Mndzebele. He succeeded his father Ngwane in 1780. When Ndvungunye became king, the centre of royal power in Swaziland was located in the south of the country in present-day NShiselweni. As a result, Ndvungunye had his royal kraal at Shiselweni at the foothills of the eMhlosheni mountains. The governors of his royal kraal were Mahagane Hlophe, and Lahaha Mbokane a son of Chief Sukumbili Mbokane. The Ndlovukati's residence and royal kraal was at Lobamba and the governor there was Danisile Nkambule. During his kingship, the most powerful chiefdoms in the region were the Ndwandwe and Mtetwa. Ndvungunye oversaw limited expansion and consolidation of the Ngwane people. The Swazi/Ngwane settlements in Shiselweni gained more wealth and military power in the form of cattle and population growth. However the Shiselweni settlements were vulnerable to attacks by the rival Ndwandwe clans who were residing south, near the Phongola river. These were to be seen later under the kingship of his son Sobhuza I.

=== Family and successors ===
Ndvungunye had several wives and many children. The most famous of his children was Sobhuza I who he had with Somnjalose Simelane. The incomplete list of Ndvungunye's children is as follows:

- Ngwenyama Somhlolo ( Sobhuza I, Ngwane IV )
- Prince Malunge
- Prince Magwegwe
- Prince Ngwekati
- Prince Phungodze
- Prince Sobandla
- Prince Sobhiyoze
- Prince Sobokazane
- Prince Ndlovu
- Prince Ngcayini
- Prince Fetshane
- Prince Nkunzana
- Prince Cebisa
- Prince Mphondvo
- Prince Taba
- Prince Luhlavane

== Legacy ==
There is presently a school called Ndvungunye Primary School located in Mzinsangu.

Regnal titles
| Preceded by LaYaka Ndwandwe (Queen Regent) | King of Swaziland; 1780-1815 | Succeeded by Lomvula Mndzebele (Queen Regent) |
