= Kaap River =

Kaap River Little Crocodile River
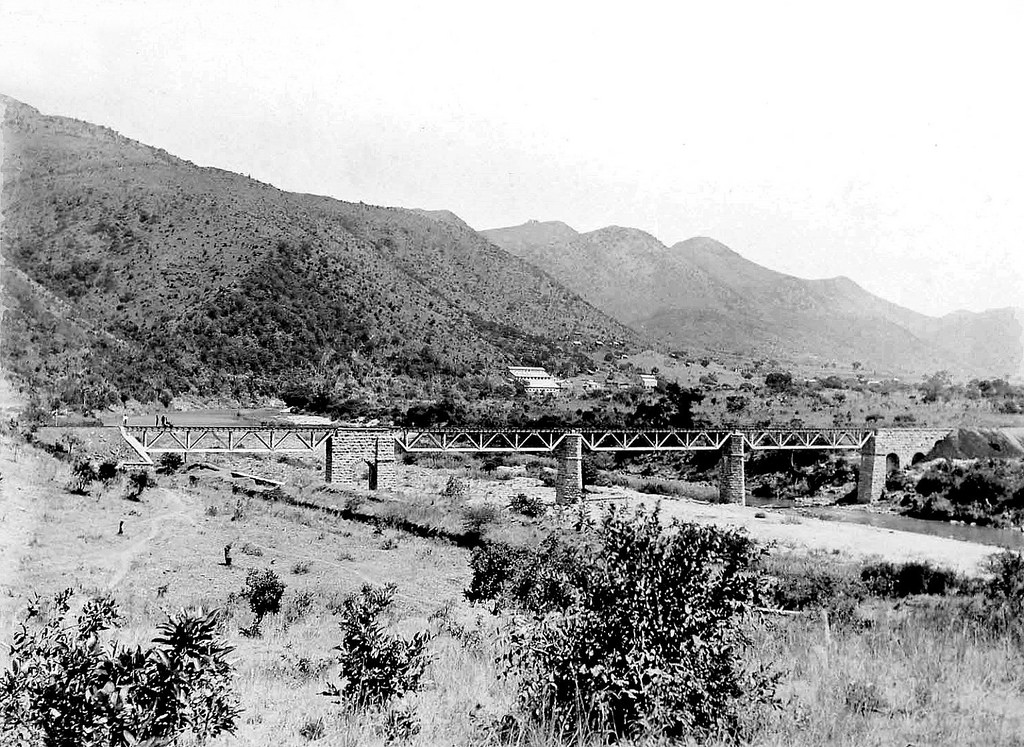
- The Avoca train bridge pictured in 1895

- Location of mouth
- Etymology: from De Kaap Valley
- Native name: Umlambongwane (Tsonga)

Location
- Country: South Africa
- Region: South African lowveld

Physical characteristics
- Source: northern Drakensberg
  - location: near Kaapsehoop (North Kaap) and Nelshoogte (South Kaap), Mpumalanga
  - elevation: 1,800 m (5,900 ft)
- Mouth: Crocodile River
  - location: Kaapmuiden, Mpumalanga
  - coordinates: 25°32′25″S 31°18′49″E
  - elevation: 350 m (1,150 ft)

The Kaap River (also Umlambongwane or Little Crocodile River) is a river in the De Kaap Valley of eastern Mpumalanga province, South Africa. It is a tributary of the Crocodile River with which it has a confluence at Kaapmuiden. The Kaap River has two main tributaries, namely the North Kaap River (Afrikaans: Noordkaap) and South Kaap River (Afrikaans: Suidkaap). Its lower reaches cut through the scenic Krokodilpoortsberge, where it has several tributaries, including Figtree creek and Low's creek (or Mantibovu).

== History ==
The catchment area of the river was once inhabited by the Mbayi tribe, or people of Maseko, who were lorded over by the bakaNgomane. Their places of residence can still be recognized by their cairns, the purpose of which is unclear.

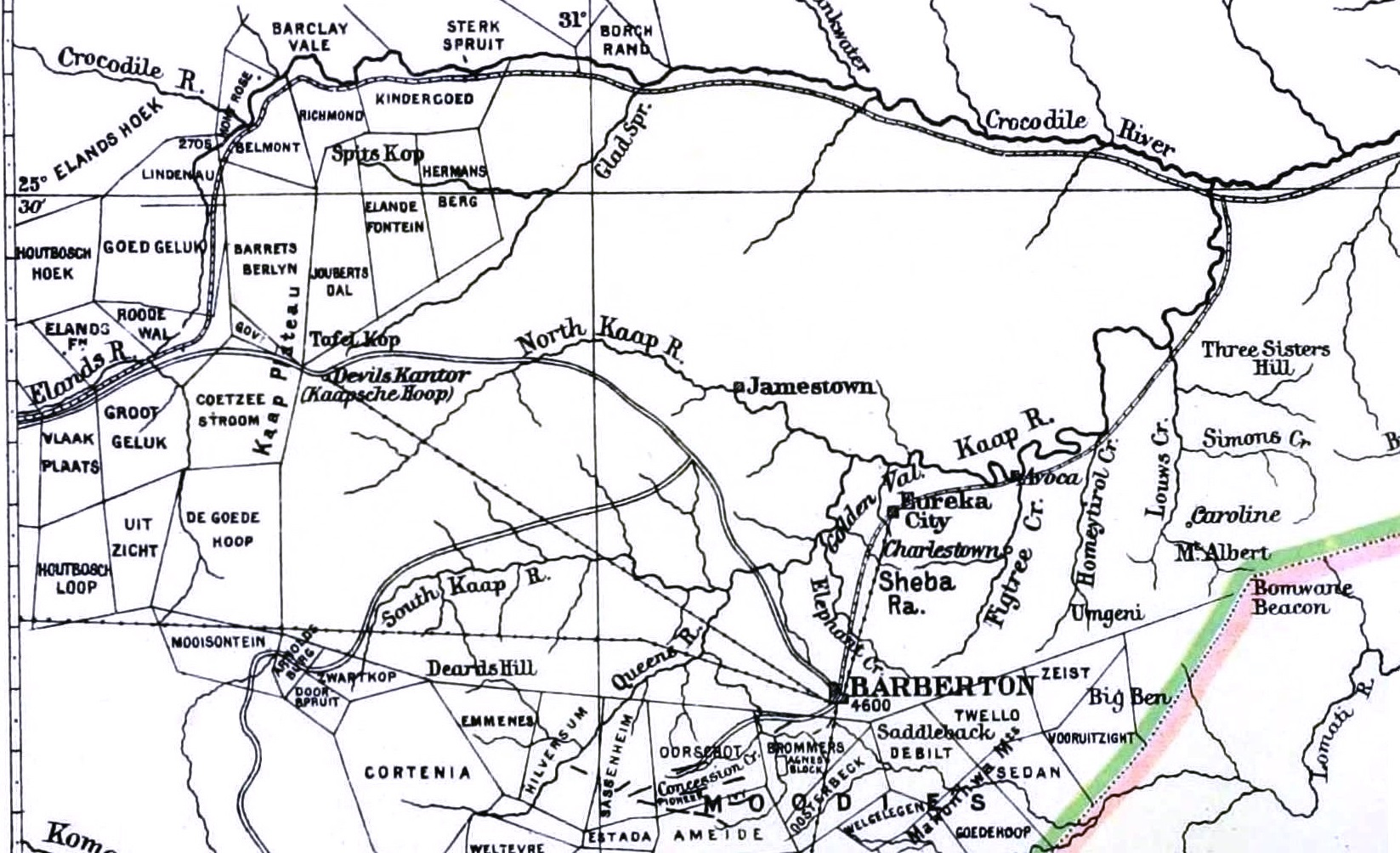
The Kaap River and its tributaries on a map of 1895. The border between South Africa and Swaziland (since 2018 renamed to Eswatini) is shown at bottom right.

== See also ==
- List of rivers of South Africa
