= Liqoqo =

Supreme traditional advisory council of Eswatini

Swazi National Council
- Liqoqo
- Dissolved: 1986
- Type: Traditional advisory council
- Headquarters: Mbabane, Eswatini

Liqoqo was the name of a traditional council in Eswatini (formerly Swaziland) that historically served as the kingdom's supreme advisory body. It was a body of senior princes, chiefs and royal advisers and was responsible for the custodian of Swazi customary law, sovereignty and kingship.

It was renamed the Supreme Council of State in 1982 from its name Swazi National Council. King Mswati III dissolved it in 1986.

== History ==
The council traces its origins to the advisory structures established by earlier Swazi kings. Following the death of King Mswati II in 1868, the Liqoqo exercised authority and selected Sisile 'LaMgangeni' Khumalo as the Queen Mother.

During King Bhunu's era, the Liqoqo temporarily succeeded in prohibiting the sale of European liquor in Swaziland through prime minister Tikuba Magongo.

In the early 1960s, it opposed a British proposed independence constitutional reforms in Eswatini, arguing that the introduction of elected legislative institutions undermined Swazi customary governance and royal authority.

The 1968 Constitution of Swaziland (now Eswatini) formally recognised Liqoqo in Article 144(1) as a council partly elected by the Swazi National Council, partly selected by the King and partly appointed according to custom, with both the King and the Queen Mother serving as members.

The Liqoqo was eventually dissolved by King Mswati III in 1986, as part of efforts to consolidate royal authority and replaced with the Liqoqo King's Advisory Council.
