= Tsandzile Ndwandwe =

Queen Regent of Eswatini from 1868 to 1875)

Ndlovukati of Swaziland
- Reign: 1840 – 1875
- Predecessor: Lojiba Simelane
- Successor: Sisile Khumalo
- King: Mswati II (until 1868); None (since 1868)

Queen regent of Swaziland
- Regency: 1868 – 1875
- Predecessor: Mswati II (as king)
- Successor: Mbandzeni (as king)
- Born: Zulu Kingdom
- Died: Swaziland
- Spouse: King Sobhuza I
- Issue: Prince Ndzimandze (died young); Princess Mzamose; Mswati II
- House: Ndwandwe (by birth); Dlamini (by marriage)
- Father: Zwide kaLanga

Thandile 'Tsandzile' Ndwandwe, also known as LaZidze ("daughter of Zwide"), was the Queen Mother (Ndlovukati) of Swaziland in 1840–1875 and the Queen Regent of Swaziland in 1868–1875.

She was the daughter of King Zwide kaLanga, the senior wife of King Sobhuza I, and the mother of King Mswati II.

== Marriage and children ==
According to Nguni custom, a high-ranking bride was accompanied by younger female relatives and attendants to her marriage. Among those who accompanied Tsandzile Ndwandwe to her marriage to King Sobhuza I were her half-sisters, including File Ndwandwe, LaVumisa Ndwandwe and Veya Ndwandwe, who later became co-wives of King Sobhuza I. Queen Tsandzile bore three children with Sobhuza I, first-born Prince Ndzimandze who died in infancy, second-born Princess Mzamose and Mswati II. LaVumisa bore Prince Malambule while File was the mother of Prince Ndwandwa.

Regnal titles
Preceded by King Mswati II of Swaziland	Queen Regent of Swaziland; 1868-1875	Succeeded by Crown Prince Ludvonga II
