= LaMgangeni Khumalo =

Ndlovukati of Swaziland
- Reign: 1875 – 1881
- Predecessor: Tsandzile Ndwandwe
- Successor: Tibati Nkambule
- King: Mbandzeni
- Born: Sisile Khumalo
- Died: 1881
- Issue: Ludvonga II
- Father: Mgangeni Khumalo

Sisile Khumalo, better known as LaMgangeni (died 1881), was Ndlovukati (queen mother) of Swaziland during the reign of King Mbandzeni. Her only son, Prince Ludvonga II, died of poisoning without heirs in 1872 and without becoming king.

Khumalo was influential in the choice of Mbandzeni (later King Dlamini IV) as successor to King Mswati II.

== Biography ==
LaMgangeni was chosen by King Mswati II from amongst the daughters of Mgangeni Khumalo. In 1855, she gave birth to Ludvonga, who, in 1868, was selected by the Liqoqo to succeed Mswati as King of Eswatini following a brief period of internal struggle. Crown Prince Ludvonga married Mdvumo Mthimkhulu, but died in 1872 of a suspected poisoning before producing an heir.

LaMgangeni, who had only given birth to Ludvonga, was requested by the Liqoqo to choose one of Mswati's sons for the throne; in a compromise with competing claimants to the throne and with support of the Transvaal Republic, she chose Mbandzeni, a son of Nandzi Nkambule, one of Mswati's wives, who died when Mbandzeni was very young.

From the beginning of Mbandzeni's rule in 1875 until her death, LaMgangeni served as the Ndlovukati of Eswatini, during which she advised the king regarding numerous treaties with Boer and English land claimants.

Around 1880, Mdvumo, wife to LaMgangeni's late son, became a wife to Mbandzeni, giving birth to a son named Mdzabuko who became LaMgangeni's favourite. The young Mdzabuko, considered the rightful heir of the kingdom, died at a young age. Following his death, LaMgangeni allegedly spread rumours that Mbandzeni was behind the child's death, and after she was discovered to have conspired to kill Mbandzeni as well, the decision was made by the king and the Swazi National Council to put her to death. She was killed and replaced as the Ndlovukati by Tibati Nkambule, the sister of Mbandzeni's mother.

== Death ==
LaMgangeni Khumalo was caught by warriors loyal to Mbandzeni and killed near Mbabane while trying to flee the kingdom in February 1881.
