= Mbandzeni =

King of Swaziland from 1875 to 1889

King Dlamini IV

King of Swaziland
- Reign: 1875–1889
- Coronation: 1875
- Predecessor: Mswati II
- Successor: Bhunu
- Queen Mother: Sisile Khumalo (until 1881); Tibati Nkambule (since 1881)
- Born: c. 1855; Gundvwini
- Died: 7 October 1889 (aged 33–34); Mbekelweni
- Burial: Mbilaneni
- Spouse: Labotsibeni Mdluli
- Issue: Bhunu; Malunge waMbandzeni
- House: House of Dlamini
- Father: Mswati II
- Mother: Nandzi Nkambule

Mbandzeni (also known as Dlamini IV, Umbandine, Umbandeen) (c. 1855–1889) was the King of Swaziland (now Eswatini) from 1872 until 1889. Ingwenyama Mbandzeni was the son of Mswati II and Nandzi Nkambule. His mother the wife of King Mswati had died when he was still very young.

Mbandzeni ascended to the throne after his half brother Ludvonga II died before he could become the king. Ludvonga's death resulted in his mother Inkhosikati LaMgangeni Khumalo adopting Mbandzeni who was motherless as her son, thus making him king and her the queen mother of Swaziland. His royal capital was at Mbekelweni. During his kingship Mbandzeni granted many mining, farming, trading and administrative concessions to white settlers from Britain and the Transvaal. The Boers had tricked the king into signing permanent land concessions. The king could not read or write, so the Boers made him sign the concessions with a cross. The king was told that these were not permanent land concessions but the papers themselves stated otherwise. These concessions granted with the help of Offy Sherpstone eventually led to the conventions of 1884 and 1894, which reduced the overall borders of Swaziland and later made Swaziland a protectorate of the South African Republic.

During a period of concessions preceded by famine around 1877 some of the tindvunas (governors) from within Swaziland like Mshiza Maseko and Ntengu kaGama Mbokane were given permission by King Mbandzeni to relocate to farms towards the Komati River and Lubombo regions, Mshiza Maseko later settled in a place called eLuvalweni towards Nkomati River, where he was later buried. Mbandzeni, still in command of a large Swazi army of more than 15,000 men aided the British in defeating Sekhukhune in 1879 and preventing Zulu incursion into the Transvaal during the same year. As a result, he guaranteed his country's independence and international recognition despite the Scramble for Africa which was taking place at the time. Mbandzeni died after an illness in 1889 and is quoted to have said in his deathbed "the Swazi kingship dies with me". He was buried at the royal cemetery at Mbilaneni alongside his father and grandfather Sobhuza I. Mbandzeni was succeeded by his young son Mahlokohla and his wife Queen Labotsibeni Mdluli after a 5 year regency of Queen Tibati Nkambule. Today a number of buildings and roads in Swaziland are named after Mbandzeni. Among these the Mbandzeni house in Mbabane and the Mbandzeni Highway to Siteki are named after him.

== Early life ==
After the death of King Mswati II in July 1868, the Queen Mother Tsandzile Ndwandwe served as the Queen Regent. The son of Mswati II and inkhosikati LaKhumalo was chosen to become the king and was named Ludvonga II. However he died of poisoning in 1874 just before he could become the King. As a result the Swazi council of elders recommended that LaKhumalo choose another child to be "put in her stomach" and become her son. She chose Mbandzeni who was at the time motherless as his mother had died while he was very young. Mbandzeni thus became the king in 1875 though not without further drama. Another pretender to the throne, Prince Mbilini waMswati, who was allied with the Zulu Kings, first Mpande ka Senzangakhona and later Cetshwayo ka Mpande. However Mbilini never succeeded in his goal to become the King of Swaziland.

== Kingship ==
Mbandzeni's rule consists of a number of notable events. The first event was the continued interaction of Swazis and the Transvaal Boers. During the rule of Mswati, such a relationship had been established with Mswati granting some land sales to the Ohristad and Lydenburg Boers in the 1850s. During the reign of Mbandzeni, numerous visits to his capital in Mbekelweni was made by many concessionaires and settlers who were seeking land, mining rights and other business deals. Mbandzeni granted many leases to the settlers and with the advice of 'Offy' Shepstone the nephew of Sir Theophilus Shepstone who was the administrator of the Natal colony, even more. Mbandzeni and royal officials granted many overlapping concessions to the British and Dutch interests and in return were paid in either gold or cattle or other available currency or goods. It is as a result of these that Swaziland came to be of major interest to British settlers and burghers from the Dutch republics for its potential in agriculture, mining and in general settlement. The discovery of gold in the Transvaal exacerbated the issue.

Immediately into the reign of Mbandzeni, skirmishes between the British and the Boers had begun and Britain annexed the Transvaal and made it its colony. The Zulu Kingdom in the South under Cetshwayo was still independent with British recognition, but would soon be at war with Britain. The Zulu war occurred in 1879 and the renegade Swazi Prince Mbilini who was married to the granddaughter of Chief Manzini Mbokane a trusted confidant of King Mbandzeni was allied with the Zulu King Cetshwayo during this period. Chief Mbokane through his son Ntengu Mbokane, who was the father of Prince Mbilini's wife intervened and ensured that Prince Mbilini's cooperation with King Cetshwayo was stopped. Despite that King Cetshwayo would often raid the southern chiefdoms of Swaziland. As a result, Mbandzeni would not accept the request of Cetshwayo to assist in the war against the British. Indeed Swazi troops helped to prevent Zulu raids into the Transvaal. During the same year, the British forces under Sir Garnet Wolseley in the Transvaal, sought Swazi help to defeat the Pedi King Sekhukhune who had resisted the Boers a few years earlier in 1876. The Pedi, having harbored another Prince who was a pretender to the Swazi throne eventually faced a British attack backed by a 10000 strong Swazi force which led to the capture of Sekhukhune and the destruction of that kingdom. Mbandzeni's support for Britain was rewarded with Britain's recognition for Swaziland's independence and a promise to protect Swazis against Zulu and Boer encroachment. However the concessions Mbandzeni and Mswati earlier had granted to the settlers would be detrimental to the independence issue as they were used in the Swaziland conventions in 1884 and in 1894 with Britain reneging on its promises.

The present border of Swaziland was decided upon in these two conventions, with Shepstone representing Swazi interests in the 1884 and Allister Miller in 1894. In both negotiations, no direct Swazi representation was present. The border with the Portuguese territorial boundary was decided to be the Lubombo ranges for Swaziland and the MacMahon line for British Tongaland (in South Africa). The border with the South African Republic was chosen to be the present boundary, cutting off many Swazi homes including royal villages such as Mjindini, Mekemeke, among others. As a result many Swazis remain residents of South Africa especially in Mpumalanga province, a number bigger than the population of Swaziland proper.

== Later life ==
Mbandzeni died after ill health during the border discussions with very little input from him. He was buried at the royal burial site at Mbilaneni where Mswati II and Sobhuza I had been buried. Mbandzeni like other Swazi kings before him had many wives, and children. His wife Labotsibeni Mdluli was chosen to be the Queen Mother and her son Mahlokohla was chosen to be the King of Swaziland. A regency period of about 5 years followed with Queen Regent Tibati Nkambule ruling and then the young Ngwane V taking over. It was during this time that Swaziland was made a protectorate of the South African Republic although a complete administration never took place.

== Legacy ==
Mbandzeni's rule is viewed differently by many people. Some view him as someone who sold his country. In some publications it is even said that Mbandzeni "sold the land but kept his country". Some viewed him as a kind hearted person who did not know when to stop. However some consider him as a ruler who did what he could at a difficult time.

Regnal titles
Preceded by Crown Prince Ludvonga	King of Swaziland; 1875–1889	Succeeded by Tibati Nkambule (Queen Regent)
