= Ludvonga II =

- Crown Prince of Swaziland
- Reign: Designated heir, c. 1868-1872
- Successor: King Mbandzeni (Dlamini IV)
- Regent: Queen Tsandzile Ndwandwe
- Born: Macaleni Dlamini c. 1855; Swaziland
- Died: 1872; Swaziland
- Burial: Mdzimba Mountain
- House: House of Dlamini
- Father: King Mswati II
- Mother: Queen Sisile LaMgangeni Khumalo

Ludvonga II (also Macaleni; c. 1855 – 1872) was the Crown Prince of Swaziland, son of Mswati II of Swaziland. He was the only son of Queen Sisile 'LaMgangeni' Khumalo with King Mswati II.

== Early life ==
Ludvonga was born around 1855 to King Mswati II and Sisile 'LaMgangeni' Khumalo.

When King Mswati II died in 1868, the Liqoqo, a Swazi royal council, selected Ludvonga II's mother, LaMgangeni, as the Queen Mother. Ludvonga II, then about seventeen years old, was designated as the future king.

== Marriage and death ==
As part of his preparation for Swazi kingship, Ludvonga married Mdvumo Mthimkhulu. The marriage, however, did not produce any children. In 1872, Ludvonga II died due to suspected poisoning and his mother was requested to choose an heir amongst King Mswati II's sons and she selected Mbandzeni to be the King of Eswatini.

Regnal titles
Preceded by Tsandzile Ndwandwe (Queen Regent)	Crown Prince; Never Ruled the Kingdom	Succeeded by Dlamini IV
