= Shiselweni Region =

Shiselweni eShiselweni
- Shiselweni Region
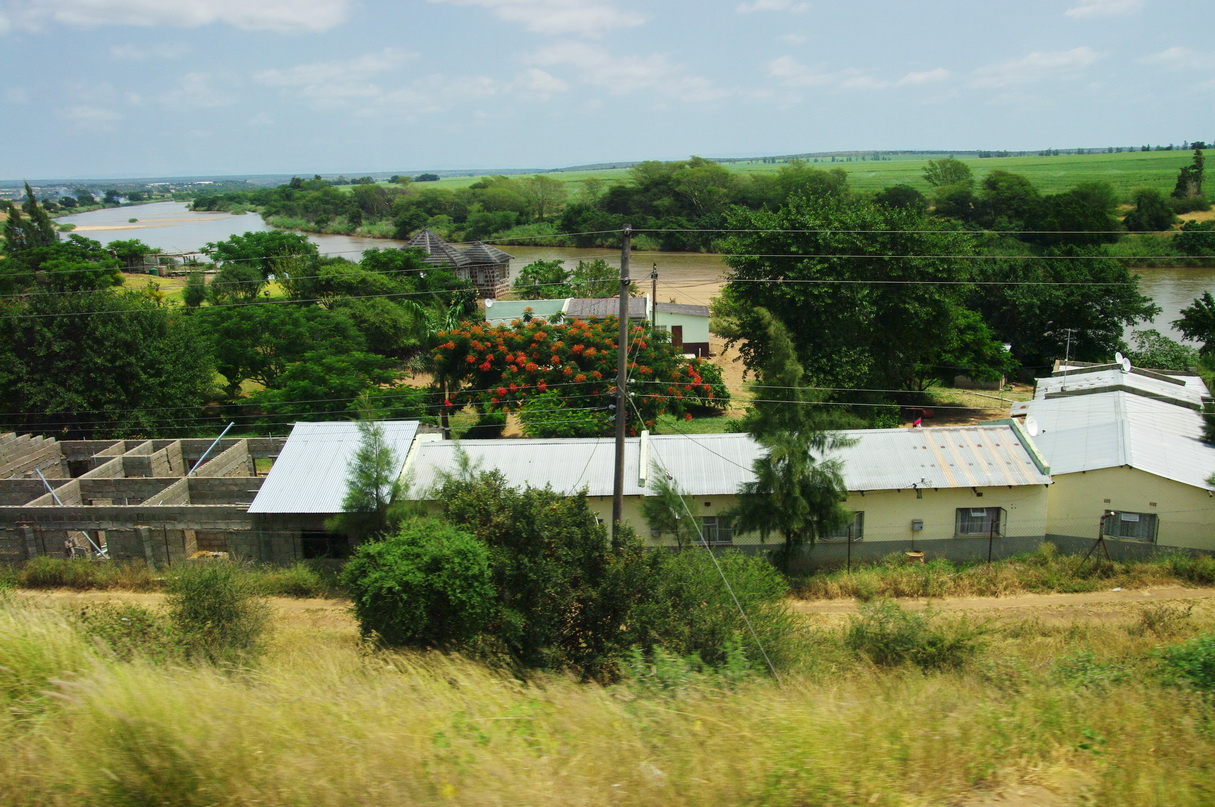

- Map of Eswatini showing Shiselweni district
- Coordinates: 27°00′S 31°40′E
- Country: Eswatini
- Capital: Nhlangano

Government
  - Regional Administrator: Mr Paul S Dlamini
  - Regional Secretary: Mr Mshiyeni Dlamini

Area
  - Total: 3,786.71 km^{2} (1,462.06 sq mi)

Population (2017 census)
  - Total: 204,111
  - Density: 53.9019/km^{2} (139.605/sq mi)
- Time zone: UTC+2
- HDI (2017): 0.574 medium

Shiselweni is a region of Eswatini, located in the south of the country. It has an area of 3,786.71 km² and a population of 204,111 (2017). Its administrative center is Nhlangano. It borders Lubombo in the northeast and Manzini Region in the northwest.

== Administrative divisions ==
Shiselweni is subdivided into 14 tinkhundla (or constituencies). These are local administration centres, and also parliamentary constituencies. Each inkhundla is headed by an indvuna yenkhundla or governor with the help of bucopho. The tinkhundla are further divided into imiphakatsi (or chiefdoms). The present tinkhundla are:

- Gege
  - Imiphakatsi: Emhlahlweni, Emjikelweni, Endzingeni, Ensukazi, Kadinga, Katsambekwako, Mgazini, Mgomfelweni, Mlindazwe, Sisingeni
- Hosea
  - Imiphakatsi: Ka-Hhohho Emva, Ludzakeni/Kaliba, Lushini, Manyiseni, Nsingizini, Ondiyaneni
- Kubuta
  - Imiphakatsi: Ezishineni, Kakholwane, Kaphunga, Ngobelweni, Nhlalabantfu
- Maseyisini
  - Imiphakatsi: Dlovunga, Kamzizi, Mbilaneni, Vusweni
- Matsanjeni South
  - Imiphakatsi: Bambitje/Nsalitje, Dinabanye, Ekuphumleni, Qomontaba
- Mtsambama
  - Imiphakatsi: Bhanganoma, Ekwendzeni, Kambhoke, Magele
- Ngudzeni
  - Imiphakatsi: Ekukhanyeni, Ekulambeni, Lusitini, Ndushulweni, Ntjanini, Nyatsini
- Nkwene
  - Imiphakatsi: Ebuseleni, Hlobane, Kagwebu, Kuphumleni, Nhlalabantfu, Sigcineni
- Sandleni
  - Imiphakatsi: Bufaneni, Enkalaneni, Ka-Nzameya, Kagasa, Kontjingila, Mbelebeleni, Mphini, Ngololweni, Nkhungwini, Tibondzeni
- Shiselweni I
  - Imiphakatsi: Dumenkungwini, Mabona, Mchinsweni, Zikhotheni
- Shiselweni II
  - Imiphakatsi: Embheka, Mahlalini, Makhwelela, Mbabala, Mkhitsini, Mphangisweni, Sikhotseni
- Sigwe
  - Imiphakatsi: Empini, Kankhomonye, Lindizwa, Lulakeni
- Somntongo
  - Imiphakatsi: Ezindwenweni, Maplotini, Mlindazwe, Phangweni, Qomintaba, Vimbizibuko
- Zombodze
  - Imiphakatsi: Bulekeni, Mampondweni, Ngwenyameni, Zombodze

== Religion ==
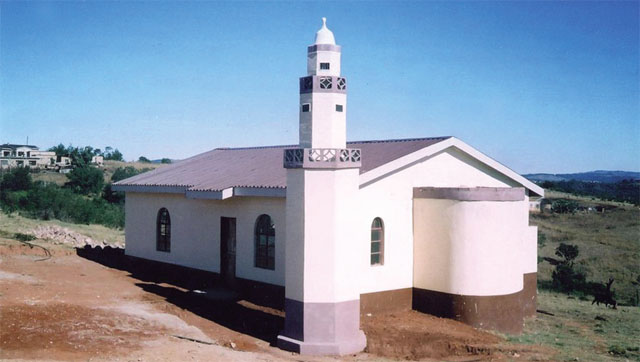
Baitul Hadi mosque, Hlatikulu.

Christianity and Islam are the main religions in the region.
