= Sobhuza I =

King of Eswatini from 1815 to 1836

King of Eswatini
- Reign: 1815–1836
- Predecessor: Ndvungunye
- Successor: Mswati II
- Queen Mother: Lojiba Simelane
- Born: c. 1788; Eswatini
- Died: 1850 (aged 61–62); Eswatini
- Burial: Mbilaneni
- Issue: Malambule Dlamini; Mswati II; Ndwandwa Dlamini; Tsekwane; Ndlaphu; Somcuba
- House: House of Dlamini
- Father: Ndvungunye
- Mother: Somnjalose Simelane

King Sobhuza I (also known as Ngwane IV, Somhlolo) (c. 1788–1836) was king of Eswatini, from 1815 to 1836.

Born around the year 1788, his father was King Ndvungunye (also known as Zikodze), and his mother was Somnjalose Simelane. He was called Somhlolo ("man of mysteries"). His father, King Ndvungunye, died after being struck by lightning. When Sobhuza was king, Lojiba Simelane, instead of his mother, Somnjalose was Queen Mother because Somnjalose was an inhlanti or support bride to Lojiba. Somhlolo is a greatly revered king of Eswatini. He had his first royal capital or kraal at Zombodze in the Shiselweni region, but moved it north to new Zombodze in central Eswatini. Swazis celebrate Somhlolo Day every September 6 as their Independence Day and the national stadium is named Somhlolo National Stadium.

Sobhuza was succeeded by his son Mswati II and his wife Tsandzile Ndwandwe as Queen Mother after a short regency by Queen Lojiba Simelane. Sobhuza by the time of his death had conquered a country claimed to reach to modern day Barberton in the north, Carolina in the west, Pongola River in the south and Lubombo Mountains in the east.

== Background ==
Sobhuza's mother Somnjalose was the younger sister and inhlanti co-wife to her elder sister Lojiba Simelane, Ndvungunye's senior wife. Lojiba had no male children herself. Sobhuza, as son of her sister co-wife, was considered Lojiba's classificatory son under Ngwane royal kinship and succession principles. While Sobhuza thus became Ndvungunye's heir and successor, Lojiba rather than Somnjalose became Indlovukati or Queen Mother upon his accession.

== Kingship ==
The reign of Sobhuza I marked a crucial phase in the history of Eswatini. As Sobhuza began his reign, KaNgwane was a realm centered in territory along the Pongola River to the south of modern Swaziland, whose northern reaches encompassed today's southern Swaziland. KaNgwane was ruled by kings of the Dlamini clan, who had earlier ruled an area in and around the Lubombo Mountains to the east. It was only under Sobhuza's grandfather, Ngwane III, ca. 1750, that the Dlamini kings conquered and established the country Sobhuza inherited, incorporating more than a dozen smaller chiefdoms led by chiefs from other clans. Early in Sobhuza's reign, the Ngwane kingdom faced strong risks of conquest by the more powerful Ndwandwe and Zulu kingdoms to the south in the 1810s and 1820s. Sobhuza moved the main royal center northward into what is now Zombodze central Eswatini, with many of his followers relocating as well. The former royal centers in Shiselweni became southern outposts.

After moving the center of Dlamini royal power to the north, Sobhuza led the conquest of many local chiefdoms. KaNgwane became a kingdom comparable in scope and power to those of the Zulu, the Maroti kingdom, or the Pedi. Sobhuza I notably married inkhosikati Tsandzile Ndwandwe the daughter of Zwide Ndwandwe the leader of the powerful Ndwandwe clan south of the Pongola River. The Swazi clans under the leadership of Sobhuza I were constantly in conflict with the Ndwandwe’s. As a result, Sobhuza made an offer to marry one of the daughters of Zwide and establish peace with his neighbours. Sobhuza I had many wives, one of whom, Tsandzile, bore him Mswati II and Mzamose Dlamini. Mswati would eventually succeed him as king.

== Later life ==
King Sobhuza 1st died in 1850 and is buried at the royal burial site at Mbilaneni. Sobhuza left his son Mswati II a country claimed to be reaching modern day Barberton in the north, Carolina in the west, Pongola River in the south and Lubombo Mountains in the east, which is larger than present day Eswatini. The clans that were conquered before and during Sobhuza's tenure are referred to as Emakhandzambili.

Regnal titles
Preceded by Lomvula Mndzebele (Queen Regent)	King of Eswatini; 1815–1836	Succeeded by Lojiba Simelane (Queen Regent)
