= Mswati II =

King of Eswatini from 1840 to 1868

King of Eswatini
- Reign: 1840–1868
- Predecessor: Sobhuza I
- Successor: Mbandzeni
- Queen Mother: Tsandzile Ndwandwe
- Born: c. 1820; Near present-day Manzini
- Died: August 1868 (aged 45-48); Hhohho, Eswatini
- Burial: Mbilaneni
- Issue: Mbandzeni; Ludvonga II; Mbilini waMswati; Gija
- House: House of Dlamini
- Father: Sobhuza I
- Mother: Tsandzile Ndwandwe

King Mswati II (c. 1820 – August 1868), also known as Mswati and Mavuso III, was the King of Eswatini between 1840 and 1868. He was also the eponym of Eswatini ("Mswati Land"). Mswati is considered to be one of the greatest fighting kings of Eswatini.

Under his kingship, the territorial boundaries of Eswatini were greatly increased. Mswati was the son of Sobhuza I and Tsandzile Ndwandwe (known as "LaZidze") who after ruling as Queen Mother became Queen Regent after the death of her son. After the death of Sobhuza, Mswati inherited an area which extended as far as present day Barberton in the north and included the Nomahasha district in the Portuguese territory of Mozambique.

Mswati's military power, initially suppressed by infighting with his brothers Fokoti, Malambule, and Somcuba over the kingship, was increased in the late 1850s and thereafter. When Mswati's armies attacked organized forces of other Bantu tribes or nations, the goal was initially plunder in the form of cattle and captives, rather than incorporation into one political unit. During this period the arrival of Trekboers, in what would become the Transvaal republic, marked the first contact between Swazis and European settlers. Mswati greatly extended the boundaries of the Swazi territory beyond that of the present state with military outposts and royal villages outposts such as Embhuleni, on the upper Komati River at the foot of the Mkhingoma Mountains in Badplaas, Mekemeke near the Mbayiyane Mountains, situated east of Mantibovu (Louw's Creek), Emjindini in Barberton and Malelane in Nkomazi. The death of Mswati II in August 1868 ended the era of Swazi conquest, territorial expansion and resulted in unification of various people into one nation.

== Early life ==
Ingwenyama Mswati II was born as a son of Somhlolo or Sobhuza I and Queen Tsandzile Ndwandwe, the daughter of Zwide kaLanga, the leader of the powerful Ndwandwe clan south of the Pongola River. The Swazi clans under the leadership of Sobhuza I were constantly in conflict with the Ndwandwe's. As a result, Sobhuza made an offer to marry one of the daughters of Zwide and establish peace with his neighbors. This culminated in a party being sent to the Ndwandwe capital and Tsandzile was chosen as the wife to bear the successor to Sobhuza. Mswati's early life after the death of Sobhuza was marked by disputes over the kingship with his brothers. As a result of this Mswati and his mother were installed in their positions before either of them was properly prepared. Such circumstances during his early life are sometimes considered to have predisposed him to be fierce and decisive later in his rule. When Mswati ascended to the throne, his predecessor left him a country claimed to be reaching modern day Barberton in the north, Carolina in the west, Pongola River in the south and Lubombo Mountains in the east.

== Kingship ==
After succeeding his father in 1850, King Mswati II commenced a career of large-scale raids and adventure. He selected, as his hunting ground, the prosperous tribal lands of the various groups to the north of Eswatini. He became rich and his crack regiments, such as the Nyatsi, Umbhula and the Malalane, brought terror to African homes as far afield as Zimbabwe and Mozambique. His crack regiments were used more importantly against emakhandzambili chiefs in Swazi territory and others outside Eswatini. The foothills of the Drakensberg, westwards from Malelane and Low's Creek to the Barberton mountain land, were occupied by Mbayi, also known as the Maseko people, who were held in subjection by, but were not incorporated with, the people of AbakaNgcamane Maseko. They were driven out of this area in 1852 by the Swazi regiments. They fled north and occupied the area between the Crocodile and Sabie Rivers. King Mswati II also used his force to influence political events in the Gaza kingdom, east of the Lubombo mountains. He also defended his country against Zulu encroachment with great determination.

Mswati built a line of military outposts from west to east along the 'Little Crocodile River' (Kaap River). At each outpost he stationed some of his regiments to watch and stop the Bapedi returning to their old haunts. The posts were Mbhuleni, on the upper Komati River, at the foot of the Mkhingoma Mountains, south of Badplaas, where Ngcina Matsebula was the indvuna, and Nandzi LaMagadlela Khumalo the Nkhosikati (chieftainess), and at Mekemeke, just east of the Mbayiyane mountains (Three Sisters), situated east of Mantibovu (Low's Creek), where Mekemeke 'Lanyandza' Magongo was the chieftainess and Mhlahlo Vilakati the indvuna. Mekemeke is situated high up on the eastern side of the Mbayiyane mountains, from where the drift in the Crocodile River near Malelane could be observed should the Mbayi return to the area. Mswati moved his administrative capital and military posts to Hhohho, on the northern bank of the Mlumati River and continued his attacks on the various tribes, which include the Bapedi, the Baphalaborwa, the Lobedu near Duiwelskloof, the Venda of Zoutpansberg and as far afield as the Great Zimbabwe and the plains of Mozambique. A. T. Bryant writes that in this way Mswati gradually extended borders, increased his subjects and added to the wealth and strength of his kingdom. It is clear that he had a formidable army and Bryant calls him 'a veritable Shaka of the north' . The indvuna of Hhohho was Matsafeni Mdluli fourth, brother of Labotsibeni, who later became the mother of Ngwane V. Matsafeni moved to the Nelspruit area in 1888 and H. L. Hall named the station Mataffin, 5 km west of Nelspruit, after him. Malambule who was Mswati's half-brother, held the reins of government until the young Mswati became king of Eswatini in 1840. Malambule appropriated and hid some of the royal cattle for himself, colluding with his brother Fokoti to commit an act that was tantamount to treason. When Mswati found out about the cattle, he sent his men to punish Malambule. Malambule fled with his brothers Fokoti, Sidubela and Ndlela to the south of the country to seek refuge among the Kunene clan. They later fled to Zululand when Mswati sent his regiments to attack this clan for giving protection to the refugees.

The disruption of rival kingdoms magnified Mswati's power and distant tribesmen sought his protection. King Mswati 2nd established loyal groups in sparsely populated chiefdoms under their own leadership, and in others, he placed royal princes and trusted commoners. These new groups and the immigrants became known as Emafikamuva ( "those who arrived after" ).

== Later life ==
Mswati died at his royal residence at Hhohho in August, 1865, aged about forty. He had danced the annual incwala 19 times. He was buried at the royal burial hill at Mbilaneni, next to his father King Sobhuza I and great-grandfather King Ngwane III. The death of Mswati II ended the era of Swazi conquest, territorial expansion and unification of various peoples into one nation. Mswati's successor was the eleven-year-old Ludvonga II who died in 1874 without any children. Ludvonga's elder-half brother Mbandzeni became the new King in June 1875, reigning as Dlamini IV (1875-1889). Earlier, Ludvonga's older half brother Mabhedla was regarded as a threat to the crown prince and had to flee from Eswatini. He fled Eswatini in approximately 1872 or 1873 and lived for a while on the farm Stonehaven, some 8 km northwest of Louw's Creek, before moving on until he settled at the Leolo Mountains, near Steelpoort, west of Burgersfort where died in 1895 and is buried there.

Regnal titles
Preceded by Queen Lojiba Simelane (Queen Regent)	King of Swaziland; 1840–1865	Succeeded by Queen Tsandzile Ndwandwe (Queen Regent)
