= Catherine Sihlangu =

Queen Mother of Embhuleni (b. 15 April 1935 -)

- Queen Mother of Embhuleni
- Reign: 1954 - present
- Born: 15 April 1935 (age 91); Bushbuckridge, Mpumalanga, South Africa
- Spouse: Chief Johannes Mkolishi Dlamini
- Issue: Prince Cambridge Makhosonke Dlamini
- House: House of Dlamini

Catherine Sihlangu (born 15 April 1935) is the Queen Mother of Embhuleni, a Swazi royal village in South Africa's Mpumalanga province. She is the widow of Chief Johannes Mkolishi Dlamini and the mother of the current Chief of Embhuleni, Prince Cambridge Makhosonke Dlamini.

== See also ==
- Embhuleni
- Chief of Embhuleni
- Chief Johannes Mkolishi Dlamini
- Chief Makhosonke Dlamini
- Queen Gogo LaMagadlela
- Queen Bikwaphi Khumalo
- Chief James Maquba Dlamini
