= Johannes Mkolishi Dlamini =

Chief of Embhuleni from 1954 to at death in 1988

Prince Mkolishi Dlamini

Chief of Embhuleni
- Reign: 1954–1988
- Coronation: 1954
- Predecessor: Prince James Maquba Dlamini
- Successor: Prince Cambridge Makhosonke Dlamini
- Born: 25 December 1928; Badplaas Mkhingoma Mountain
- Died: 23 December 1988 (aged 59); Embhuleni, Badplaas
- Burial: Dlomodlomo Mountain
- Spouse: Catherine Sihlangu
- House: House of Dlamini
- Father: Chief James Maquba Dlamini
- Mother: Mkhosise Madonsela

Prince Johannes Mkolishi Dlamini (25 December 1928 – 23 December 1988), was a Chief of Embhuleni in Badplaas between September 1954 until his death, at age 59, in December 1988. A great-grandson of King Mswati II, Mkolishi was the son of the previous Chief of Embhuleni, Prince James Maquba Dlamini and his wife Mkhosise Madonsela.

Chief Mkolishi Dlamini succeeded his father Prince Maquba Dlamini as the Chief of Embhuleni royal kraal on 18 September 1953.

== Early life and career ==
Prince Mkolishi Dlamini was born in Badplaas at the Mkhingoma Mountains on 25 December 1928. He was the son of the late Chief of Embhuleni, Prince James Maquba Dlamini, and his wife, Mkhosise Madonsela. Through his father, Maquba, he was a grandson of King Mswati II.

He married Catherine Sihlangu, with whom he fathered Prince Cambridge Makhosonke Dlamini in 1959.

Mkolishi received his primary and secondary education in the Carolina and Ermelo districts, now part of the Gert Sibande District.

Following the death of Chief Maquba on 18 September 1954, Mkolishi was installed as Chief of Embhuleni by his royal family. However, the National Party government only issued him a certificate of recognition in December 1959. He played a key role in the developments leading to the establishment of homeland administration thereafter.

In 1976, he was elected chairman of the Swazi Territorial Authority, which later became the KaNgwane government. He subsequently served as a member of the KaNgwane Legislative Assembly and held the position of Minister of Justice in the KaNgwane government.

== Political roles ==
Chief Mkolishi Dlamini was elected as the founding chairperson of the Swazi Territorial Authority in 1976. The Apartheid government established the Authority as part of its policy to create self-governing homelands for the Siswati-speaking people within the Republic of South Africa.

In 1977, Chief Mkolishi was voted out as chairman of the Swazi Territorial Authority due to his opposition to its structure, which he believed was designed to separate the South African Swatis from eSwatini. He was succeeded by Enos John Mabuza, who later became the Chief Executive Councillor of the homeland. Following this transition, the administration was renamed the KaNgwane government.

Although Chief Mkolishi influenced the naming of KaNgwane - meaning Home of the People of eSwatini -he remained strongly opposed to the Bantustan system. He argued that it excluded the broader Embhuleni territory from eSwatini and fought for the incorporatation of the KaNgwane area (now Mpumalanga) into eSwatini under King Sobhuza II. Together with other chiefs, he protested against the inclusion of non-Siswati speakers, such as the Shangaan people, within the KaNgwane territory.

Mabuza, however, disagreed with Chief Mkolishi, insisting that ethnicity should not dictate political arrangements and that the homelands were meant to serve all oppressed black South Africans in the area. With majority support within the Authority, Mabuza advanced the Bantustan administration through the Inyandza National Movement, a political party he founded in 1978 to govern KaNgwane.

In the same year, Chief Mkolishi formally appealed to King Sobhuza II to negotiate with the Apartheid government for KaNgwane’s incorporation into eSwatini. The issue became contentious. It was based on both territorial claims and the South African government's apartheid policies, Swaziland as part of the ancestral lands of the Swati people. If approved, the cession would have seen the denationalization of Mpumalanga people of a population of around 800,000, who were Swati speakers. The plan to incorporate the region to Swaziland was announced by the apartheid government in 1982 and led to legal challenges that made President P. W. Botha to establish the Rumpff Commission, tasked with investigating the potential incorporation of KaNgwane into Swaziland. It was also mandated to consider the wishes and best interests of the affected Emaswati people. Opponents of the plan argued that it violated the international law on self-determination for the other people in the area who were not Swati speakers. The cession was ultimately shelved, and the territorial question remained unresolved.

Although Chief Mkolishi Dlamini’s direct involvement in the incorporation campaign declined after the early 1980s, the issue remained active among Embhuleni’s traditional leadership. In the early 1990s, his successor and son, Chief Cambridge Makhosonke Dlamini, continued to advance similar arguments before South Africa’s constitutional negotiating forums, the Multi-Party Negotiating Process. However, the campaign lost momentum after Sobhuza II’s death in 1982. Chief Mkolishi also founded Inyatsi ya Mswati, a political party aimed at uniting all Swazis and pressuring the South African government for a fairer land allocation for the Swazi people.

== Forced removal ==
In 1984, Chief Mkolishi protested the forced removal of villagers from Badplaas to Nhlazatshe. He even threatened to go to court to get an interdict against the Apartheid bureaucracy. The Apartheid government said the blacks who had been living in the Badplaas area since 1842 were on a whites-only area and needed to relocate to Nhlazatshe. He won the battle when the government backed down following a widely publicized outcry.

== Recognition ==
- Prince Mkolishi Clinic, a government healthcare facility in Badplaas
- Mkolishi Secondary School, a government school in Tjakastad
