= David Mkhwanazi =

South African politician (born 1951)

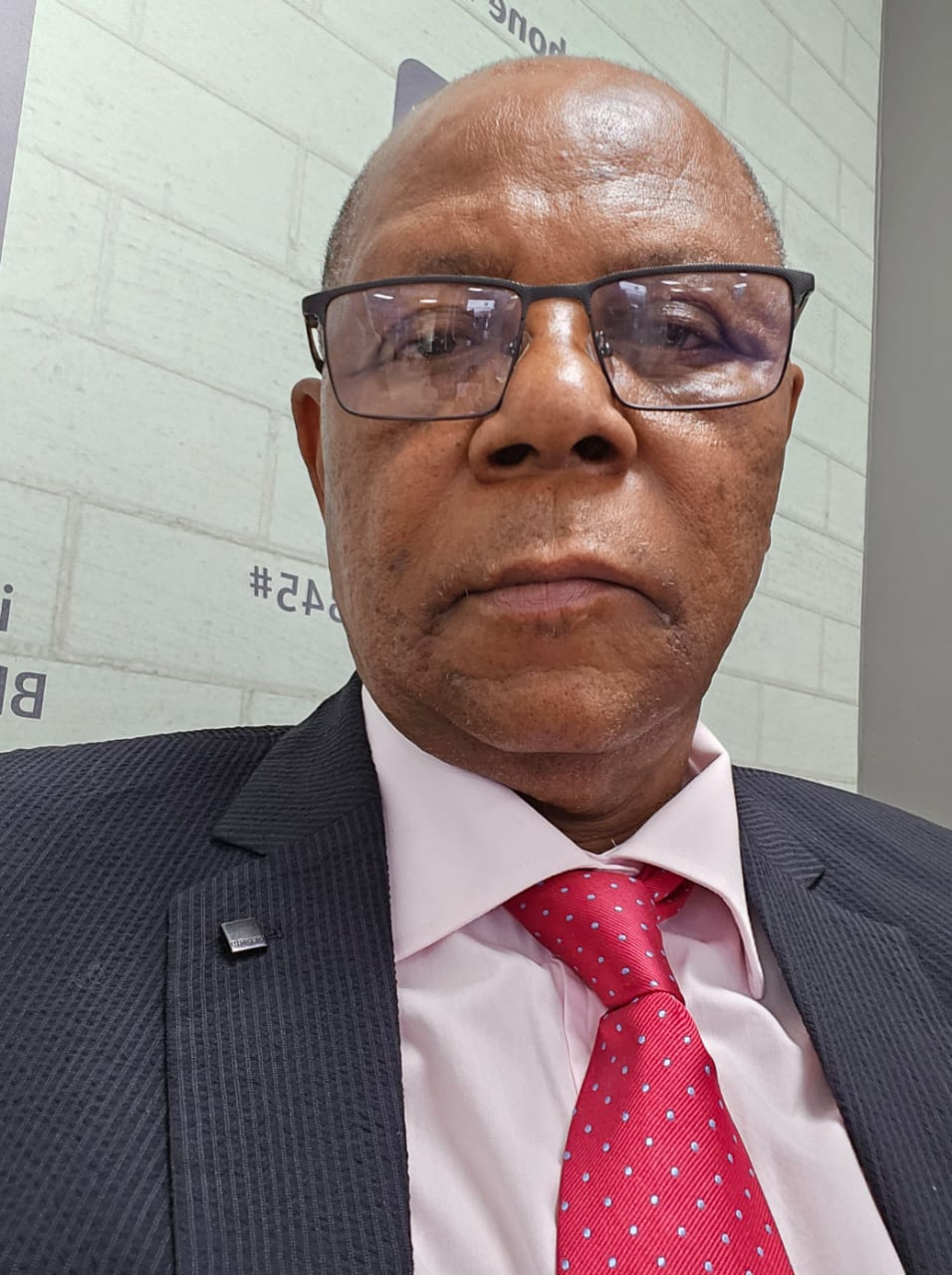
- David Mkhwanazi in 2024
- Born: 16 June 1951 (age 75); Ermelo, Mpumalanga, South Africa
- Education: Technikon South Africa (now University of South Africa)
- Occupation: Politician
- Spouse: Cynthia Mkhwanazi
- Children: Wilson Mkhwanazi, Wanda Mkhwanazi, David Mkhwanazi
- Mother: Jane Kubheka

David Sunnyboy Mkhwanazi, (also known as DS Mkhwanazi; born 16 June 1951), is a South African politician who served both in the KaNgwane government and post-Apartheid government. He served in Mathews Phosa's first Mpumalanga government, appointed the MEC for the Department of Environmental Affairs. He was a member of the KaNgwane Legislative Assembly from 1983 to 1994, member of the Mpumalanga Provincial Legislature from 1994 to 2009 and was subsequently appointed to the Public Service Commission of South Africa.

== Early life ==
David Sunnyboy Mkhwanazi was born on 16 June 1951 in Ermelo, where he was affectionately known as "Da" by family and friends during his upbringing in the townships of Ermelo. He was raised by his church-going maternal grandmother, who nurtured him and his siblings within the teachings of the Seventh-day Adventist Church. Mkhwanazi attended Peter Mabuza Primary School and Lindile Secondary School in Ermelo. His early career began with work at Camden Power Station as a clerk, followed by a position as a general laborer at Ermelo Inn. In 1970, he took on a third job as a salesman for the once-popular South African furniture store, Super Furniture, in Ermelo. Later, he relocated to White River, Mpumalanga to work for Eastvaal Furniture. In 1978, Mkhwanazi bought his first car, a sky-blue Renault TS 1.6, for R600. He completed his matriculation in 1983 through adult education classes in KaBokweni. He went on to graduate with a B-Tech in Public Management from Technikon South Africa (now UNISA). Mkhwanazi was also active in politics, joining the Inyandza National Movement, which later affiliated with the African National Congress (ANC) during Apartheid. After the end of apartheid, he served as the ANC's treasurer for Mpumalanga.

== Career background ==
Mkhwanazi was appointed minister of public works in 1986 by Chief Minister Enos John Mabuza in the KaNgwane homeland administration, with Robert Gumede serving as his secretary. In 1992, he was appointed minister of finance, a role he held until the end of the KaNgwane administration in 1994 when Nelson Mandela established the new democratic government. Following the transition, Mkhwanazi was appointed as the MEC for the Department of Environmental Affairs in 1994. However, he resigned in May 1998 amid public accusations of corruption and nepotism. Mkhwanazi was later exonerated after investigations led by Public Protector Selby Baqwa and Judge Willem Heath. His career continued with involvement in significant development projects, including the creation of the Nhlazatshe eCrossin shopping complex, which was built on land purchased from the Mlambo family in the mid-1990s with partner Herbert Theledi. In 1992, Mkhwanazi purchased a farm in Barberton, Mpumalanga for R750,000 but sold it to David Mabuza in 1996 for R440,000, a transaction that later attracted public scrutiny.

== Positions ==
- Member of KaNgwane Legislative Assembly from 1983 to 1994
- National treasurer for Inyandza National Movement from 1986 to 1994
- Minister of Public Works for the KaNgwane government from 1986 to 1992
- Minister of Economic Affairs for the KaNgwane government from 1992 to 1993
- Minister of Finance for the KaNgwane government in 1993
- Minister of Home Affairs for the KaNgwane government from 1993 to 1994
- Member of the Mpumalanga Provincial Legislature from 1994 to 2009
- MEC for Environmental Affairs from 1994 to 1998
- Commissioner for the Public Service Commission of South Africa from 2009 to 2019
