= James Maquba Dlamini =

Chief of Embhuleni from 1931 to 1954

Prince James Maquba Dlamini

Chief of Embhuleni
- Reign: 1931-18 September 1954
- Coronation: 1931
- Predecessor: Bikwaphi Khumalo (mother; regent)
- Successor: Prince Johannes Mkolishi Dlamini
- Born: c.1910 Embhuleni, Badplaas, Mpumalanga, South Africa
- Died: 18 September 1954; Embhuleni, Badplaas, Mpumalanga, South Africa
- Burial: Dlomodlomo Mountain, Badplaas
- Spouse: Mkhosise Madonsela
- Issue: Prince Johannes Mkolishi Dlamini
- House: House of Dlamini
- Father: Prince Mgwevu Dlamini
- Mother: Bikwaphi Khumalo
- Religion: African traditional religion

Prince James Maquba Dlamini (c.1910- died 18 September 1954) was a Swazi prince and a Chief of Embhuleni from 1931 until his death in September 1954. He was the father of Chief Johannes Mkolishi Dlamini.

Following the death of her aunt Queen Gogo LaMagadlela Khumalo in 1922, Maquba's mother Bikwaphi Khumalo served as regent of Embhuleni until he was installed as chief of Embhuleni in 1931.

== Early life and lineage ==
Prince Maquba Dlamini was born into the House of Dlamini, descending from Prince Kufa, a brother of King Mswati II. His mother, Bikwaphi Khumalo, was a niece of Queen Gogo LaMagadlela and a member of the Khumalo royal lineage linked to King Mzilikazi KaMashobane.

Prince Mgwevu was a son of Prince Kufa, married to Bikwaphi Khumalo and gave birth to Maquba.

Chief Maquba Dlamini died on 18 September 1954 and was succeeded by his son, Prince Johannes Mkolishi Dlamini, who later became a key player in the establishment of Bantustan in South Africa, the KaNgwane homeland administration.
