= GIJ =

GIJ may refer to:

- Generations In Jazz
- Gij, Iran
- G.I. Joe
- Gijima Group
- Ghana Institute of Journalism
- GNU Interpreter for Java
