= Embhuleni =

Royal village in South Africa (since c.1842)

Embhuleni KaGogo LaMagadlela
- Royal house
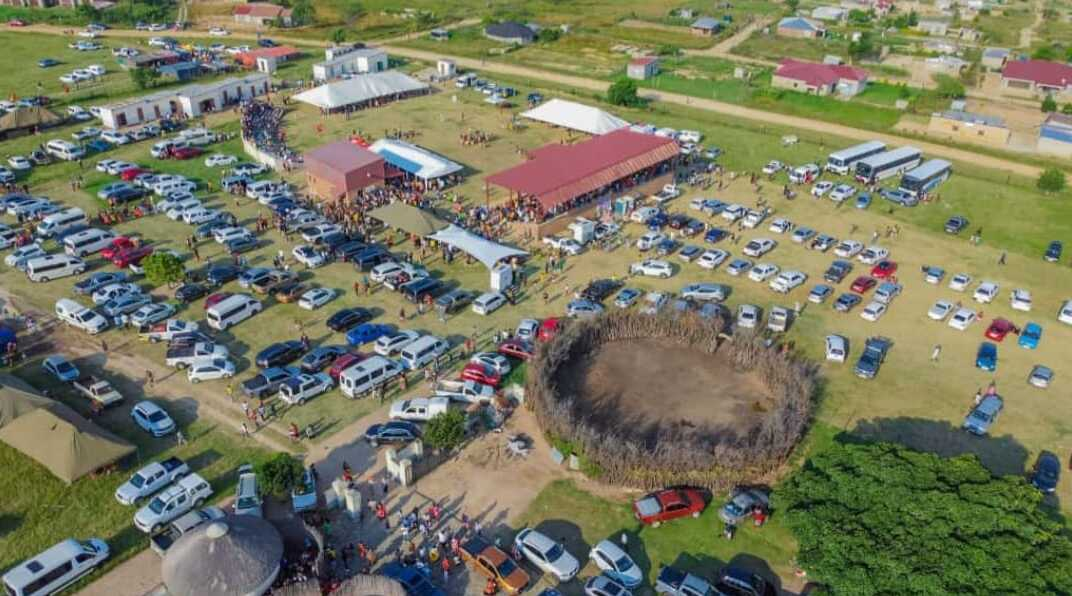
- Scores gather for the annual Ummemo Cultural Celebration in 2023 at the Embhuleni royal household, Badplaas
- Country: South Africa
- Province: Mpumalanga
- Established: c.1842
- Founder: King Mswati II
- Time zone: UTC+2 (SAST)
- Postal code: 1190

Embhuleni is a Swazi royal village in South Africa's Mpumalanga province. It is located in Badplaas and is the home of the Chief of Embhuleni, Prince Makhosonke Dlamini. Embhuleni is one of the villages in South Africa where the annual Ummemo Cultural Event takes place. Its authority under Chief Dlamini is known as Embhuleni Traditional Council, and is represented in the South African House of Traditional Leaders. It is also called LaMagadlela Royal Residence, a name adopted from one of King Mswati II's wives, Gogo LaMagadlela (the 19th century Queen of Embhuleni).

== History ==
The village of Embhuleni has existed since approximately 1842. It was established by King Mswati II as a military outpost to protect Eswatini's land from potential invasions by the Bapedi.

The original royal residence of Embhuleni was built in Tjakastad, at the foot of Mkhingoma Mountain. One of King Mswati II’s wives, Queen Ngodzela Mkhonta, initially resided there, later joined by Queens Butsikati and Mnkabi, who were sent from mainland Eswatini. However, Ngodzela was soon recalled to Eswatini after being accused of concealing the misconduct of another of Mswati II's wives, Ndzinga Jele.

Following Ngodzela’s recall, Queen Nandzi Khumalo, known as LaMagadlela, was sent to Embhuleni as her replacement. She was the daughter of Magadlela Khumalo, a Zulu chief from the Mkhondo region who was a cousin of Mzilikazi.

Over the years, the Embhuleni royal residence relocated multiple times within the Dlomodlomo area before settling in its present location in Badplaas. This final move was largely due to colonialism, which disrupted traditional life and divided Embhuleni lands into farms controlled by the Boers.

LaMagadlela bore two daughters, Princesses File and Lozindaba, but no male heirs. After Mswati II’s death in 1868, the Swazi royal family sought to ensure the continuation of the Embhuleni lineage. They negotiated with LaMagadlela's family in Mkhondo, who sent a young woman, Bikwaphi Khumalo, to marry Prince Ntjentje, a son of Mswati II’s brother, Prince Kufa. Bikwaphi and Ntjentje had a son, Prince Sunduza, who was intended to become the Chief of Embhuleni. However, following Ntjentje’s death and Sunduza’s passing from illness at a young age, the leadership succession was disrupted.

To secure the lineage, Prince Mgwevu, another of Prince Kufa’s sons, married Bikwaphi. They had five children, including Princes Maquba, Mazingela, and Makinobho Amos. Since Sunduza had died, Maquba became the first recognized Chief of Embhuleni.

After LaMagadlela’s death in 1922, Bikwaphi served as regent of Embhuleni until Maquba formally assumed chieftaincy in 1931. She died in 1939. Maquba was later succeeded in 1953 by his son, Prince Mkolishi.

== Territorial extent and frontier status ==
In the 19th-century, the Swazi kingdom developed significantly under King Mswati II and extended across a wide frontier region, from the Crocodile River in the north to the Pongola River in the south, and from the Lebombo Mountains in the east to the eastern Highveld in the west. Embhuleni lay within this western frontier zone, which included the districts of Carolina, Barberton, Ermelo, Piet Retief, Wakkerstroom, Standerton and Lydenburg, extending to the Crocodile River and along the upper Komati River and functioned as one of several important royal military settlements anchoring Swazi authority beyond the present-day borders of Eswatini like Mjindini (near present-day Barberton) and Mekemeke (northeast of Barberton) to safeguard land.

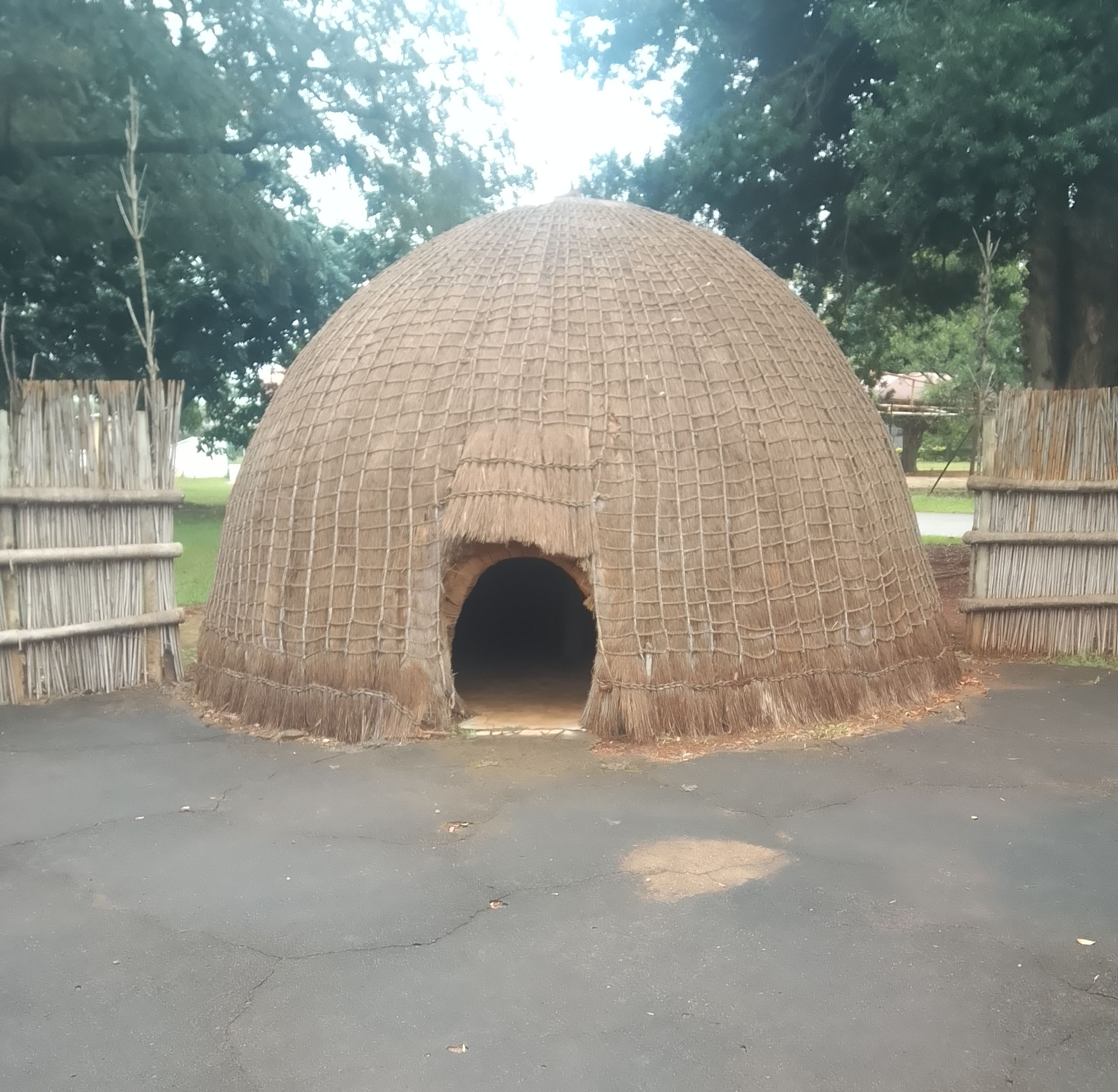
A Swazi traditional house displayed at the Eswatini National Museum, Lobamba

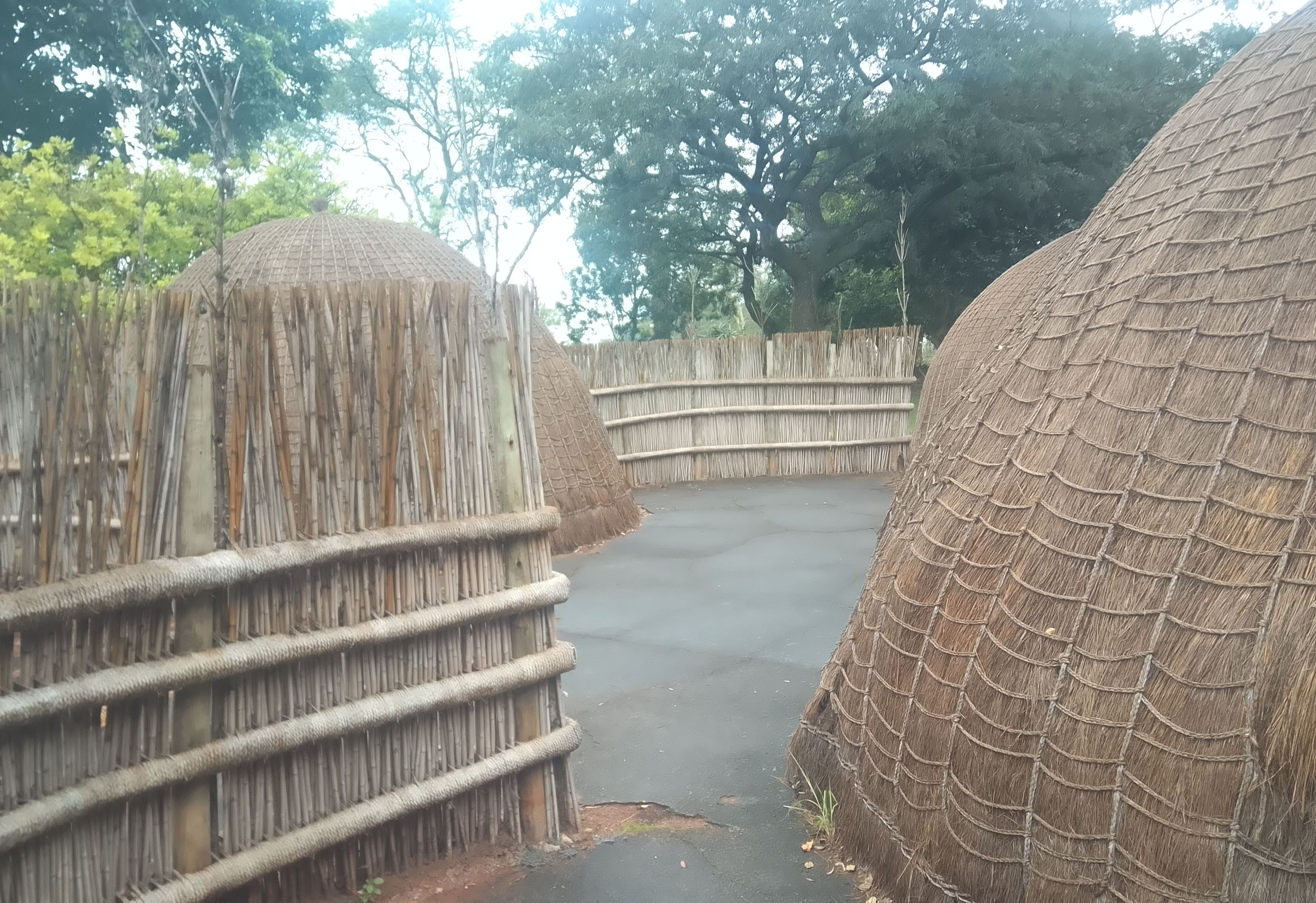

Following the death of King Mswati II in 1868, the Swazi state came under increasing pressure from Boer and British expansions. Few years before Mswati II's death, the boundaries set by the colonial authorities were not clear. But the Pretoria and London Conventions of 1881 and 1884, during the Scramble for Africa era, defined the borders of Swaziland - and excluded several key royal villages, including Embhuleni, from the kingdom.

Swazi rulers consistently disputed the northern and northwestern boundary lines, arguing that areas such as Embhuleni were Swazi territories. King Mbandzeni continued to contest these borders until shortly before his death in 1889. Despite political separation, Embhuleni retained its status as a royal settlement with enduring ties to the Swazi monarchy.

During the apartheid era, the Embhuleni royal kraal under Chief Mkolishi and King Sobhuza II advocated for the incorporation of KaNgwane (now part of Mpumalanga) into Eswatini. Their campaign was based on historical territorial claims and the controversial borders established during the Scramble for Africa, but these efforts were ultimately unsuccessful.

== List of Chiefs of Embhuleni ==
- Prince James Maquba Dlamini served as chief from 1931 until 1954
- Prince Johannes Mkolishi Dlamini served as chief from 1953 to 1988
- Prince Cambridge Makhosonke Dlamini from 1988–present
