= Gogo LaMagadlela =

Queen of Embhuleni (c.1827-1922)

- Born: Nandzi Khumalo circa 1827; Mkhondo, Sobhuza Kingdom
- Died: 1922 (aged 94–95); Embhuleni, South Africa
- Title: Queen of Embhuleni
- Spouse: King Mswati II
- Father: Magadlela Khumalo
- Relatives: Bikwaphi Khumalo (niece); Ndebe Khumalo (brother)

Nandzi "LaMagadlela" Khumalo (known as Gogo LaMagadlela; c. 1827 - 1922) was one of King Mswati II's wives and the Queen of the Embhuleni royal kraal in Badplaas, South Africa.

LaMagadlela played a key role in the Embhuleni royal household, which was established around 1842 by King Mswati II as a military post at the foot of Mkhingoma Mountain in Tjakastad. This stronghold was strategically built to protect Eswatini territory from potential invasion by the Bapedi. At Embhuleni, she exercised authority over the regiments stationed there.

== Biography ==
Nandzi "LaMagadlela" Khumalo was the daughter of Magadlela Khumalo, a Zulu chief from Mkhondo with a first generation sibling relations with Mzilikazi KaMashobane. Upon her arrival at the Swazi royal household, she was given the name "LaMagadlela" (meaning "daughter of Magadlela"). Later in life, she became known as "Gogo LaMagadlela" (Granny LaMagadlela).

=== Embhuleni ===
In late 1842, LaMagadlela was brought from one of King Mswati II's residences in mainland Swaziland to replace Ngodzela Mkhonta as the queen of the newly established Embhuleni royal kraal. Ngodzela had been recalled after it was discovered that she had concealed the sexual misconduct of Ndzinga Jele, another of Mswati II's wives.

LaMagadlela had two daughters with Mswati II, Princesses File and Lozindaba. After Mswati II’s death in 1868, the Swazi royal family sought to ensure a male heir for the Embhuleni royal lineage. Since LaMagadlela had only daughters, a delegation was sent to her family in Mkhondo to request a young woman from the Khumalo clan to bear an heir. As a result, Bikwaphi Khumalo, the daughter of LaMagadlela’s younger brother, Ndebe Khumalo, was sent to Embhuleni. She was married to Prince Ntjentje, the son of Mswati II’s brother, Prince Kufa. Their union produced Prince Sunduza, who was expected to become the Chief of Embhuleni. However, Ntjentje died soon after Sunduza's birth, and Sunduza himself died at a young age after contracting the flu in 1918.

Following these events, Prince Mgwevu, another son of Prince Kufa, was arranged to marry Bikwaphi Khumalo. They had five children, including Princes Maquba, Mazingela, and Makinobho Amos. After LaMagadlela's death in 1922, Bikwaphi acted as regent until 1931, when her son, Maquba, was installed as the first officially recognized Chief of Embhuleni. Bikwaphi died in 1939.

Maquba ruled until his death in 1953, after which he was succeeded by his son, Prince Johannes Mkolishi Dlamini.

== Recognitions ==
- Lamagadlela Primary School, a government school in Nhlazatshe, Mpumalanga, South Africa
