= Robert Gumede =

South African businessman and philanthropist

- Born: 9 August 1963 (age 63); South Africa
- Education: University of Zululand
- Occupation: Businessman
- Spouse: Portia Mkhize

Robert Gumede (born 9 August 1963) is a South African businessman and philanthropist. He is the founder of the IT firm Gijima Technologies and its holding company Gijima Group.

== Early life ==
Robert Gumede was one of seven children raised by his mother and grandmother in the town of Nelspruit, South Africa. He worked as a golf caddie, gardener and a petrol attendant to help support his family in his youth. He went on to study law at the University of Zululand, graduating in 1986 with a diploma in law. After graduating he worked as a clerk and prosecutor at the Kabokweni Magistrate's Court. Gumede was employed as secretary by the Ministries of Justice and Public Works in the KaNgwane government, working in David Mkhwanazi's office.

== Business career ==
In 1988 Gumede left his job with the Ministry of Justice due to his political activities during apartheid, starting his business career when he founded Gijima Electronic And Security Systems. Gumede worked as a business consultant after moving to Johannesburg in 1992. This led him to identify a number of business opportunities and by the mid-1990s he had registered a number of companies with the name Gijima, ranging from a firm that provided protection services to the ANC-led Mpumalanga government to a stationery company. He owned the Dangerous Darkies soccer club, helping them gain promotion to the top tier NSL in 1991. Gumede's most successful venture was the IT company he set up in 1997 that successfully received government tenders to develop and deploy IT solutions for the Department of Justice and Correctional Services services and the Department of Home Affairs. The IT company was consolidated in 2002 into Gijima Afrika Smart Technologies (GijimaASTP), which went on to win additional tenders from the government owned telecoms monopoly Telkom to produce phonecards.

In 2011 GijimaAST settled out of court with the Department of Home Affairs after a dispute over a tender project worth R2.3 billion due to escalating project costs. In 2014 the Special Investigating Unit of South Africa concluded that a R360 million tender by the Department of Rural Development and Land Reform, and the State Information Technology Agency awarded to GijimaAST was irregular. Reports by The Sunday Independent newspaper about the alleged non-delivery on a government tender by GijimaAST resulted in Gumede threatening to file a R1 billion defamation lawsuit against the publication.

== Politics ==
Gumede is open about his political and financial support for the governing party of South Africa, the African National Congress (ANC), and has a close friendship with former ANC treasurer general Mathews Phosa. In 2016 he donated a fleet of 12 vehicles to the ANC's election campaign for the South African municipal elections of 2016. The Daily Maverick alleges that Gumede is part of an economic elite in South Africa that owes its existence to a system of patronage created by the ANC.

In 2018 a Sunday Times article alleged that Gumede provided substantial support to Emmerson Mnangagwa's election campaign during the Zimbabwean general election that year. It is illegal in Zimbabwe for foreigners to fund local elections. Gumede strongly denied the accusation, calling it fake news.
