= Mangisi Zitha =

South African politician

Personal details
- Citizenship: South Africa
- Party: African National Congress

Mangisi Cephas Zitha is a South African politician and businessman who served as the last Chief Minister of KaNgwane. He briefly represented the African National Congress (ANC) in the National Assembly after 1994 and subsequently served as South African High Commissioner to Mozambique until 1999.

== Political career ==
During apartheid, Zitha was the last Chief Minister of the KaNgwane bantustan, serving until the bantustan was reintegrated into the republic in April 1994. In the general election of that month, he was elected to an ANC seat in the National Assembly, but he left his seat during the legislative term in order to accept appointment as South African High Commissioner to Mozambique. He was recalled from that post in February 1999.

== Business career ==
In July 2001, Zitha was arrested in Sun City during a sting operation; he had allegedly tried to purchase 1.5 kilograms of unrefined platinum dust from undercover police officers, using R65,000 in R20 notes. He accused the police of unconstitutional entrapment, saying that the deal had been set up over two months of harassment by the officers and that he was "cunningly lured... into committing an offence I would otherwise never have considered". He said that the officers had assured him that the transaction was lawful and that he had not known that a special permit was required to trade on the platform.

The following month, it was reported that the Land Bank would auction Zitha's home and farm after he failed to honour loans with the bank. His attorney said that he had "run into financial trouble" since leaving his ambassadorial post and embarking upon a full-time career in business.
