= Chief of Embhuleni =

Head of traditional council in South Africa

- Inkosi yaseMbhuleni
- Incumbent; Chief Cambridge Makhosonke Dlamini since December 1988
- Residence: Embhuleni Royal Residence, Badplaas
- Seat: Embhuleni, Mpumalanga, South Africa
- Appointer: House of Dlamini
- Term length: Hereditary
- Formation: mid-19th century
- First holder: Chief James Maquba Dlamini

The Chief of Embhuleni (also Inkosi of Embhuleni) is the traditional leader of Embhuleni, an eSwatini royal village situated in Badplaas, Mpumalanga, South Africa. The Chief presides over the Embhuleni Traditional Council, which represents the community in the South African House of Traditional Leaders. The current Chief of Embhuleni is Prince Cambridge Makhosonke Dlamini, who ascended to the position in December 1988.

== History ==
The royal village of Embhuleni dates back to c.1842, when it was established by King Mswati II as a military post to protect Eswatini's land from potential invasions by the Bapedi. The first royal residence was constructed at the foot of Mkhingoma Mountain in Tjakastad. Mswati II assigned governance of the region to one of his wives, Queen Nandzi "LaMagadlela" Khumalo, the daughter of a Zulu chief, Magadlela Khumalo of the Mkhondo area.

Over time, the Embhuleni royal residence was relocated multiple times around Dlomodlomo before settling in its present-day location in Badplaas. The final relocation was influenced by colonial disruptions, which saw traditional Swazi land divided into Boer-owned farms.

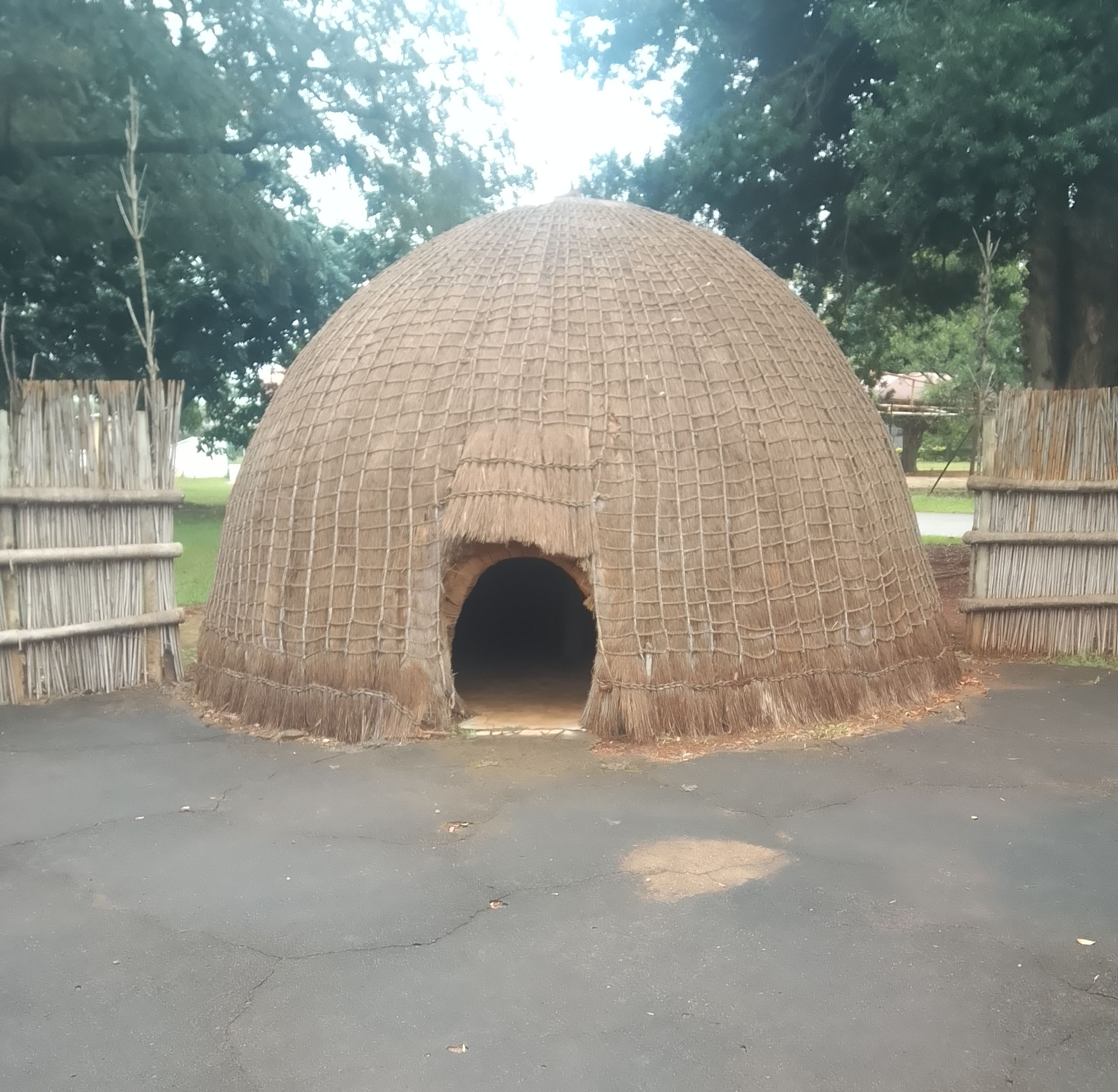
A Swazi traditional house displayed at the Eswatini National Museum, Lobamba

Following Mswati II’s death in 1868, the Swazi royal family sought to secure a male heir for Embhuleni. Since LaMagadlela had only given birth to Princesses File and Lozindaba, the Khumalo family in Mkhondo sent Bikwaphi Khumalo, LaMagadlela’s niece, to marry Prince Ntjentje, the son of Mswati II’s brother, Prince Kufa. This union produced Prince Sunduza, who was intended to be the next Chief. However, both Ntjentje and Sunduza died prematurely, leaving a leadership vacuum.

To resolve the succession crisis, Prince Mgwevu, another of Prince Kufa’s sons, was married to Bikwaphi. They had five children, among them Prince Maquba, Prince Mazingela, and Prince Makinobho Amos. Since Sunduza had died, Maquba became the first officially recognized Chief of Embhuleni.

Bikwaphi served as regent of Embhuleni after LaMagadlela’s death in 1922, until Maquba was formally installed as Chief in 1931. She died in 1939. Maquba’s rule was succeeded by Prince Johannes Mkolishi Dlamini in 1953.

During the apartheid era, the Embhuleni royal kraal, along with King Sobhuza II, unsuccessfully campaigned for KaNgwane (now part of Mpumalanga) to be incorporated into Eswatini. Their argument was based on historical Swazi territory and the contentious colonial borders imposed during the Scramble for Africa.

== Duties and recognition ==
The Chief of Embhuleni is the head of the Embhuleni Traditional Council, which administers customary governance and cultural affairs in the region. The council also engages with the South African government on matters related to traditional leadership. The Chief’s authority is inherited through Swazi royal lineage, with the House of Dlamini overseeing the appointment of successors.

Embhuleni remains a major Swazi cultural hub in South Africa, hosting the annual Ummemo Cultural Event, which celebrates Swazi traditions.

== List of Chiefs of Embhuleni ==
- Prince James Maquba Dlamini served as chief from 1931 until 1954
- Prince Johannes Mkolishi Dlamini served as chief from 1953 to 1988
- Prince Cambridge Makhosonke Dlamini from 1988–present
