= Bikwaphi Khumalo =

Queen regent of Embhuleni from 1922 to 1931

Queen regent of the Embhuleni royal household
- Reign: 1922-1931
- Predecessor: Gogo LaMagadlela (aunt)
- Successor: Chief James Maquba Dlamini (son)
- Born: c. 1860s Mkhondo, South Africa
- Died: 1939; Embhuleni, Badplaas, South Africa
- Spouse: Prince Ntjentje (d. early); Prince Mgwevu
- Issue: Prince Sunduza (d. 1918); Prince Maquba (d.1954); Prince Mazingela; Prince Makinobho Amos
- House: Khumalo clan
- Father: Prince Ndebe Khumalo
- Religion: African traditional religion

Bikwaphi Khumalo (c.1860s - 1939) was a member of the Khumalo clan in Southern Africa and Queen regent of Embhuleni from 1922 until 1931 when her son Prince James Maquba Dlamini was installed as Chief of Embhuleni. She was the niece of Queen Gogo LaMagadlela and was incorporated into the Embhuleni royal household as part of succession arrangements within King Mswati II’s dynastic line.

She was the daughter of Gogo LaMagadlela's younger brother, Ndebe Khumalo, from Mkhondo. The two Khumalo women were from King Mzilikazi KaMashobane's lineage and married into the Kingdom of Eswatini to continue the royal Swazi lineage.

== Marriage and issue ==
Following King Mswati II's death in 1868, the Swazi Royal House sought to find someone to continue the royal lineage at Embhuleni and Gogo LaMagadlela recommended her niece, Bikwaphi, who married Prince Ntjentje, a child of King Mswati II's brother Prince Kufa.

This union produced Prince Sunduza, who was intended to be the next Chief of Embhuleni. However, both Ntjentje and Prince Sunduza died prematurely, with Sunduza dying in 1918 during the period of the influenza pandemic, leaving a leadership vacuum within the Embhuleni royal household.

To resolve the succession crisis, Prince Mgwevu, another of Prince Kufa’s sons, was married to Bikwaphi. They had five children, among them Prince Maquba, Prince Mazingela and Prince Makinobho Amos. Since Sunduza had died, Maquba became the first officially recognized Chief of Embhuleni.

Bikwaphi served as regent of Embhuleni following LaMagadlela’s death in 1922, until her son Prince Maquba was formally installed as Chief in 1931. She died in 1939.
