= Ummemo =

Swazi annual cultural celebration

- Location: Eswatini and South Africa
- Type: Traditional ceremony

Ummemo is an annual traditional ceremony practised among the Swazi people of Eswatini and South Africa's Mpumalanga province. The ceremony functions as a communal call for unity, cultural preservation and ancestral veneration and is conducted under the authority of traditional leadership.

Ummemo is regarded as a sacred annual cultural practice.

== Etymology and historical origins ==
The word ummemo is derived from the Siswati verb mema, meaning “to invite”. In a cultural context, ummemo refers to an official summons issued by a chief inviting the community and wider society to come gather at the royal household in observance of Swazi traditions and rituals.

Ummemo is believed to date back to the early formation of the Swazi polity following the settlement of Swazi groups in southern Africa. Oral tradition and historical scholarship suggest the ceremony emerged as a commemorative practice to honour Swazi warriors who died in precolonial expansionist battles.

Only the Chief can formally issue the ummemo invite. Announcements are traditionally made through community structures such as tindvuna (headmen) and increasingly (nowadays) through local radio stations and social media. Age and gender regiments play a central role in the ceremony (e.g. Emajaha (young men), Emadvodza (adult men), Emachegu (elders), Tingabisa (girls), Ingcugce, bomake and bogogo (female age groups). Common dances include Sibhaca, Indlamu, Kuhlehla, Ummiso and Lutsango. Unlike national royal ceremonies such as Incwala and Umhlanga, which are convened under the authority of the King and the Queen Mother, Ummemo is a local cultural ceremony convened by chiefs.

== Geographical distribution ==
Ummemo is observed annually at several Swazi traditional and royal centres in both Eswatini and South Africa by different Swazi chieftaincies and these include,

- Embhuleni in Badplaas.
- Mekemeke near Louw's Creek
- BakaNgomane or the Hhoyi Traditional Council outside Komatipoort.
- Emjindini in Barberton.
- Mawewe Traditional Council in Mgobodzi.
- Mpakeni (KaDantjie) in Mbombela.
- Buya Nndeni Kabomntwana in Bulandzeni, Hhohho.
