= Louieville =

- Location within Mpumalanga Location within South Africa
- Coordinates: 25.677°S 31.298°E
- Country: South Africa
- Province: Mpumalanga
- District: Ehlanzeni
- Municipality: Nkomazi

Area
  - Total: 9.46 km^{2} (3.65 sq mi)

Population (2011)
  - Total: 1,364
  - Density: 144/km^{2} (373/sq mi)

Racial makeup (2011)
  - Black African: 99.6%
  - Coloured: 0.4%

First languages (2011)
  - Swazi: 94.1%
  - Tsonga: 3.2%
  - Other: 2.8%
- Time zone: UTC+2 (SAST)

Louieville is a town in Ehlanzeni District Municipality in the Mpumalanga province of South Africa. It was the capital of KaNgwane, a non-independent bantustan.
