= Gijima =

South African ICT company

Gijima Holdings
- Industry: Information and communications technology
- Founded: 1995; 31 years ago
- Founder: Robert Gumede
- Headquarters: Midrand, Gauteng, South Africa
- Area served: Africa
- Key people: Maphum Nxumalo (CEO)
- Number of employees: 1,605 (2026)
- Website: gijima.com

Gijima, officially Gijima Holdings, is a South African information and communications technology company, headquartered in Midrand, Gauteng. The company provides cloud & outsourcing infrastructure, systems integration, cybersecurity services, and unified communications services. Major Gijima partners include Microsoft, Huawei, and SAP.

== History ==
Gijima Group was founded in 1995, by South African businessman and philanthropist Robert Gumede.

The company in its current form was established in 2005, through the merger of AST Group and Gijima Technologies, forming Gijima AST Group Limited (GijimaAst). Its JSE trading code changed to GIJ after the merger.

In 2012, Gijima launched its first mobile IT platform.

In the same year, trade union Solidarity announced that, after negotiations with Gijima, it had succeeded in avoiding forced retrenchments of its members from the company. At the time, Gijima had around 3,000 employees, had already retrenched around 200, and planned to retrench around another 200. Then-CEO Jonas Bogoshi said the strategy was part of the first phase of Gijima's new business structure. After the Solidarity announcement, Gijima formally announced that there were no further retrenchments planned.

In February 2015, it was announced that Gijima intended to delist from the JSE Limited.

In 2018, Gijima won a 5-year, R150 billion contract to provide IT services to South African national rail operator Transnet.

In October 2020, Gijima acquired ICT network, application, and system provider T-Systems South Africa (TSSA) from T-Systems International, the IT services division of German Deutsche Telekom. As part of the acquisition, Gijima gained its first Tier 3-level data center.

After the end of the Gijima-Transnet contract, the rail operator lodged a case to compel Gijima to fast-track its disengagement from providing the services, including migrating data center services, SAP workloads, and Transnet's Active Directory. Transnet also requested an interdict preventing Gijima from disrupting any services during the transition.

When, in December 2024, Transnet formally instructed Gijima to terminate all services to it, some Transnet clients' operations had to cease. Transnet then retracted its instruction, and requested Gijima to resume services up to June 2025, in terms of an extended agreement.

However, Gijima said that Transnet (and partner Microsoft) had not shown that it had the technical capabilities to take over the services, and had not given Gijima a workable transition plan. A Pretoria High Court found that Transnet indeed lacked the technical capabilities to take over the services, and that Transnet had failed to discharge its obligations in terms of the master services agreement with Gijima. Transnet said it furnished Gijima with an adequate transition plan, and accused Gijima of failing to cooperate. Gijima criticized Transnet for using taxpayer money to litigate against the company.
