= Enos Mabuza =

South African politician

Enos John Mabuza
- Born: Enos John Nganani Mabuza; 6 June 1939; Barberton, South Africa
- Died: 13 December 1997 (aged 58)
- Occupation(s): Teacher, Politician

Enos John Nganani Mabuza (6 June 1939 – 13 December 1997) was a South African teacher, politician, and business executive.

== Early life ==
Mabuza was born at the Sheba gold mine in Barberton on 6 June 1939. He attended school up to Standard eight and thereafter obtained a primary teacher's diploma in Vryheid, Natal. He then studied privately for his matric, and in 1978 received an honours degree in psychology through UNISA. Mabuza also served as chief executive councillor (23 June 1977 to 18 June 1982 and 9 December 1982 to 31 August 1984) and chief minister (31 August 1984 to 1 April 1991) of the Bantustan of KaNgwane of South Africa.

== Career ==
Mabuza was a teacher by profession, and he loved English grammar, and he was known for being a perfectionist. He also contributed a lot in the development of the siSwati language in schools. In 1969 he was appointed headmaster at Khumbula secondary school in White River in the Eastern Transvaal. Three years later he was appointed an inspector, of schools, and five years later he left education for politics a controversial step at the time to become leader of the then fledgling Kangwane legislative assembly. That move led to his founding of the Inyandza Movement, which was to bring about political organisation and cohesion, which had been lacking in the area at the time.

== Inyandza Movement ==
The Inyandza National Movement played a critical role in preventing attempts by the South African government to incorporate the KaNgwane homeland into Eswatini. He took the South African apartheid government to court and won with the assistance of a young lawyer by the name of Mathews Phosa and this brought Mabuza national prominence. He made common cause with the Inkatha Freedom Party (IFP), as the territory of Ngwavuma in Northern Natal was also under threat of incorporation. His relationship with the IFP ended acrimoniously when Mabuza, in defiance of Mangosuthu Buthelezi, led a delegation to meet the ANC in Lusaka. After the 1990 unbanning of political parties, Inyandza merged into the ANC and Mabuza promptly resigned from active politics and entered the corporate world.

== Death ==
Mabuza succumbed from pancreas cancer in 1997.

== Relevant literature ==
- Sarimana, Ashley. 2011. Trials and triumphs in public office: the life and work of E J N Mabuza. Rhodes University: Doctoral dissertation.
