= Gij =

Village in Kermanshah Province, Iran

Gij گيج
- Village
- Location within Iran
- Coordinates: 34°34′27″N 46°41′18″E
- Country: Iran
- Province: Kermanshah
- County: Ravansar
- Bakhsh: Central
- Rural District: Hasanabad

Population (2006)
  - Total: 87
- Time zone: UTC+3:30 (IRST)
  - Summer (DST): UTC+4:30 (IRDT)

Gij (Persian: گيج, also Romanized as Gīj) is a village in Hasanabad Rural District, in the Central District of Ravansar County, Kermanshah Province, Iran. At the 2010 census, its population was 97, in 20 families.
