= Inyandza National Movement =

Political party in South Africa

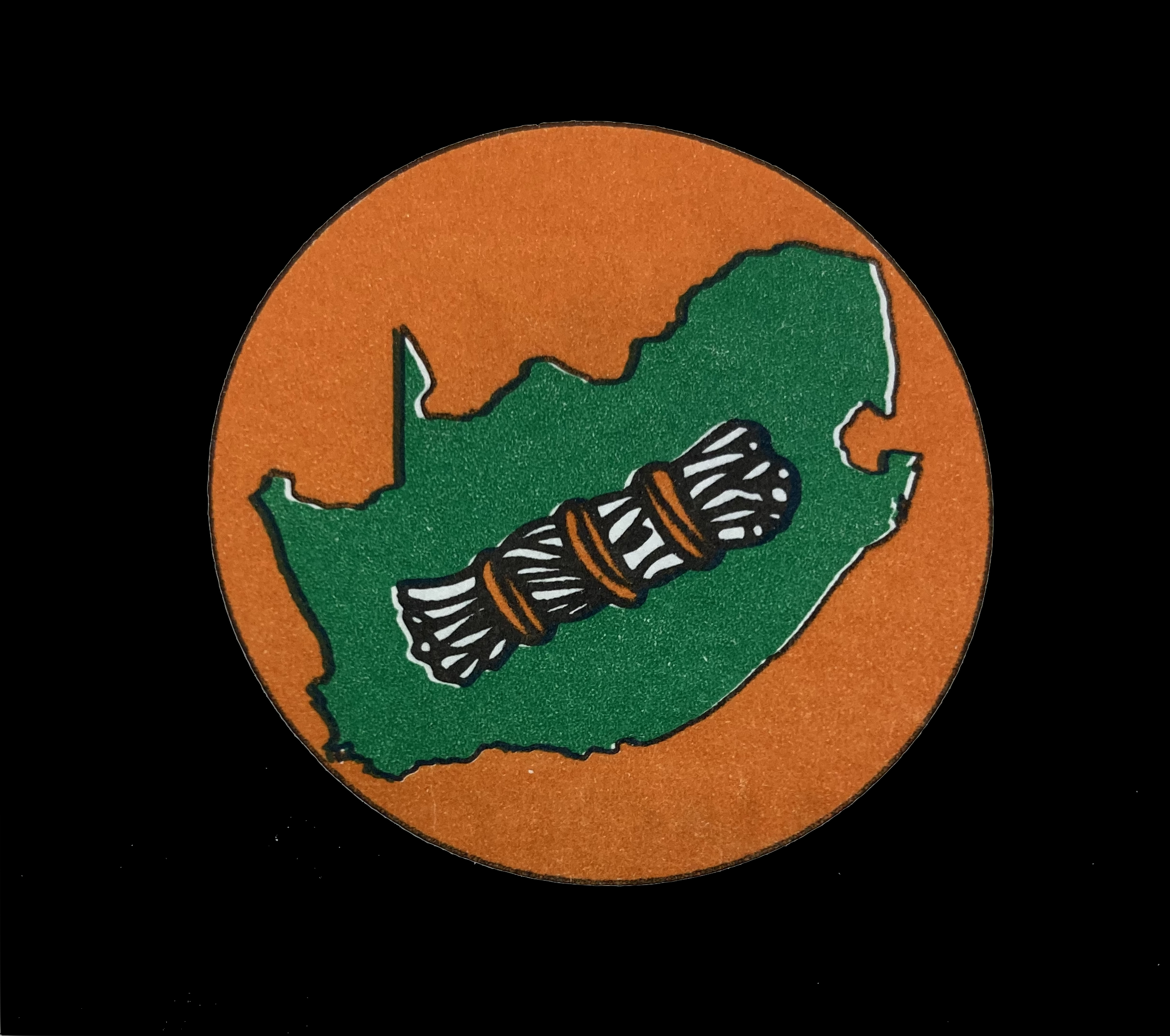
- Leader: Enos Mabuza
- Founders: Enos Mabuza; JZM Sambo
- Founded: 1978
- Dissolved: 1990
- Merged into: ANC
- Youth wing: Inyandza Youth Movement
- Ideology: Anti-apartheid
- National affiliation: ANC

Inyandza National Movement (INM) was a political party that ruled the KaNgwane homeland during Apartheid.

It was founded in October 1978 by Enos Mabuza in the village of Lochiel. It affiliated with the African National Congress (ANC) and intensified calls for its unbanning as well as Nelson Mandela's release from prison. In 1986, the leadership of the party went to meet the exiled ANC in Lusaka, Zambia to discuss issues of alliances and how best to fight the Apartheid government. From the period of the unbanning of the ANC in 1990 to the first democratic elections in 1994, the Inyandza National Congress got incorporated into the ANC.

The party was opposed to apartheid. In 1986, Enos Mabuza described the Inyandza National Movement as follows: "Our movement is progressive movement working for peaceful change, believing in a free, non-racial and democratic South Africa. We are prepared to co-operate with other democratic forces in the country, including the UDF, Azapo and lnkatha. In a way the INM is also cultural movement, with a Women's League and Youth Congress."
