= Tjakastad =

Tjakastad Mjama
- Location within Mpumalanga Location within South Africa
- Coordinates: 25.989°S 30.823°E
- Country: South Africa
- Province: Mpumalanga
- District: Gert Sibande
- Municipality: Albert Luthuli
- Founder: Sobhuza I

Area
  - Total: 14.17 km^{2} (5.47 sq mi)

Population (2011)
  - Total: 12,711
  - Density: 897.0/km^{2} (2,323/sq mi)

Racial makeup (2011)
  - Black African: 99.4%
  - Coloured: 0.3%
  - Indian/Asian: 0.1%
  - Other: 0.1%

First languages (2011)
  - Swazi: 92.9%
  - Zulu: 4.9%
  - Other: 2.1%
- Time zone: UTC+2 (SAST)
- Postal code (street): 1193
- Area code: 017

Tjakastad (known as Sidvwashini before colonialism) is a village in Gert Sibande District Municipality in the Mpumalanga province of South Africa, east of Badplaas.

== Etymology ==
The area was named after Shaka Maseko, one of King Mswati II's headmen who lived in the area in the 1800s. The Boers dubbed the area 'Tjakastad', with the Afrikaans word 'stad' meaning 'stead' or 'homestead' (Tjaka+stad for 'Shakastead' or 'Shaka homestead'). It was known as Sidvwashini before colonialism.
