= KaNgwane =

Bantustan in South Africa (1976–1994)

Coordinates: 25.68°S 31.30°E

- 1976–1994
- Flag Coat of arms

- Location of KaNgwane (red) within South Africa (yellow).
- Status: Bantustan
- Capital: Louieville (de jure); Schoemansdal (de facto)
- Common languages: Swazi; English; Afrikaans
- History
  - Self-government: 31 August 1976
  - Re-integrated into South Africa: 27 April 1994

Area
- 1980: 3,000 km^{2} (1,200 sq mi)

Population
  - 1980: 161,160
  - 1991: 779,240
- Currency: South African rand
Preceded by	Succeeded by
South Africa	South Africa

KaNgwane (Swazi: [kaˈŋɡwanɛ]) was a Bantustan in South Africa, intended by the apartheid government to be a semi-independent homeland for the Swazi people. It was called the "Swazi Territorial Authority" from 1976 to 1977. In September 1977 it was renamed KaNgwane and received a legislative assembly. After a temporary suspension of its homeland status during 1982, the legislative assembly was restored in December 1982. KaNgwane was granted nominal self-rule in August 1984. Its capital was at Louieville. It was the least populous of the ten homelands, with an estimated 183,000 inhabitants. Unlike the other homelands in South Africa, KaNgwane did not adopt a distinctive flag of its own but flew the national flag of South Africa.

KaNgwane ceased to exist on 27 April 1994 when the Interim Constitution dissolved the homelands and created new provinces. Its territory became part of the province of Mpumalanga.

== History ==
The Swazi Territorial Authority was established at Tonga in the Nkomazi Region on 23 April 1976 by the then Deputy Minister of Bantu Affairs Development and Education, Dr F. Hartzenberg (who read the speech on behalf of the then Member of Parliament and Minister of Bantu Affairs, Mr M.C. Botha).

It was established, Pretoria claimed, to cater for the interests of the Swazis within the borders of the Republic of South Africa. The first leader of the Swazi Territorial Authority administration was Prince Johannes Mkolishi Dlamini, the Chief of the Embhuleni Royal Kraal in Badplaas. The establishment of the Authority was preceded by disruptive events. In 1975, the forced removals of the people from Kromkrans, Doringkop and elsewhere, in the so-called black spots in white areas, to settlements like Kromdraai (Ekulindeni) started. In 1976, the majority of the people from Kromkrans were settled on the farm Eerstehoek.

The plans for the establishment of the Swazi ‘homeland’ continued, and in October 1977, the Swazi Territorial Authority elected Enos John Mabuza to become the Chief Executive Councillor of the ‘homeland’. The ‘homeland’ from there was named KaNgwane (a name, it should be added, that the authorities in Swaziland did not have a problem with).

An attempt to transfer parts of the homeland, along with parts of the Zulu homeland KwaZulu, to the neighbouring country of Swaziland in 1982 was never realized. This would have given land-locked Swaziland access to the sea. The deal was negotiated by the governments, but was met by popular opposition in the territory meant to be transferred. The homeland's territory had been claimed by King Sobhuza of Swaziland as part of the Swazi monarchs' traditional realm, and the South African government hoped to use the homeland as a buffer zone against guerrilla infiltration from Mozambique. South Africa responded to the failure of the transfer by temporarily suspending the autonomy of KaNgwane, then restoring it in December 1982 and granting it nominal self-rule in 1984.

== Contrasts: KaNgwane and the Inyandza National Movement ==
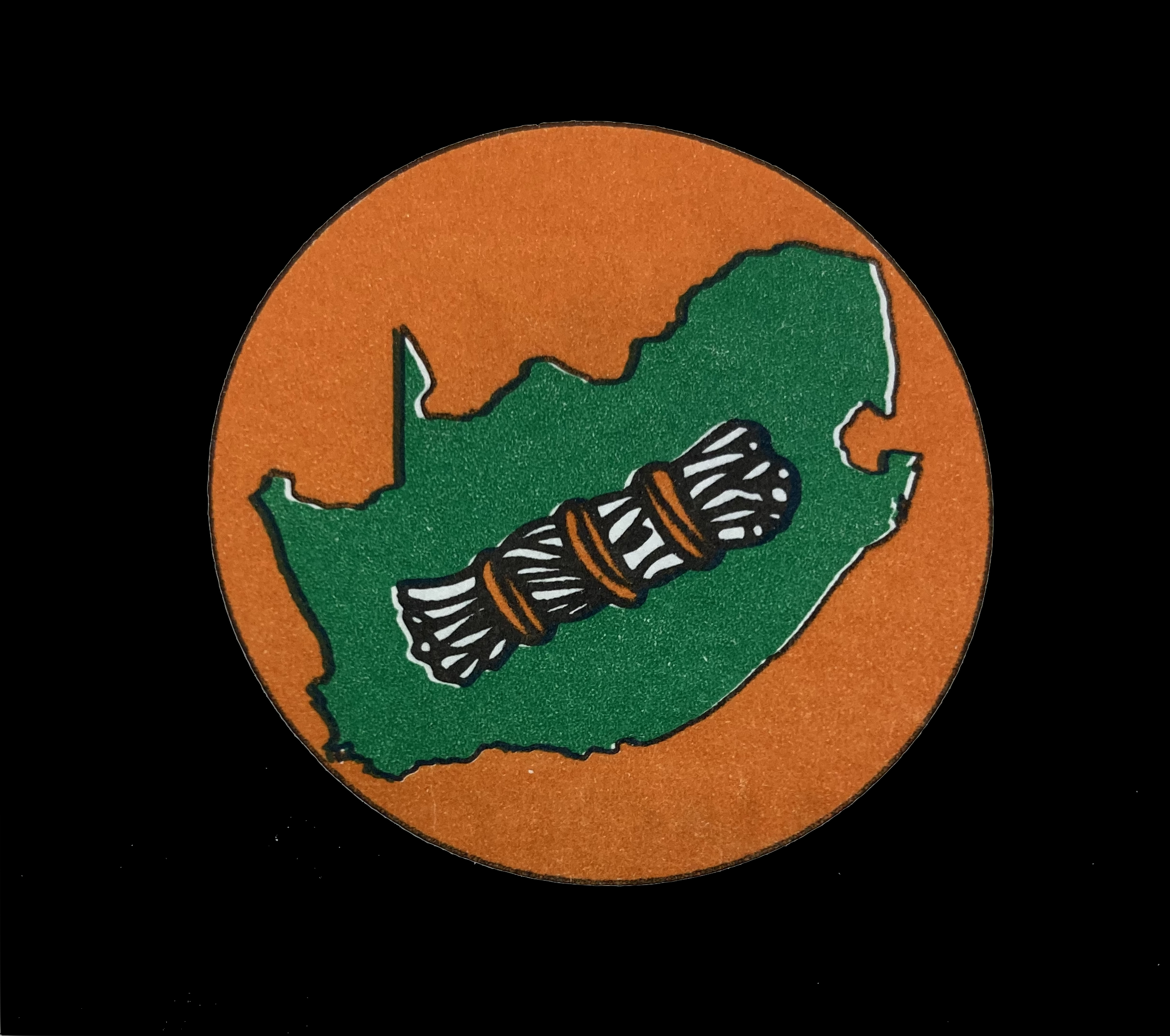
Emblem of the Inyandza National Movement

The Inyandza National Movement was the governing party of the then KaNgwane ‘homeland’ government. It was founded in October 1978 at Lochiel, a village with no more than a filling station a few kilometres from the Oshoek border post. It became a critical driving force of politics. It was through the Inyandza National Movement that KaNgwane contrasted with other ‘homelands’ and refused independence. Inyandza was formed instead to politicise and mobilise the masses of the people of KaNgwane in furtherance of the aims and objectives of the liberation movement: on the one hand, through its relationships with the ANC in exile; and, on the other, through its socio-economic development programme, through which it sought to uplift the standard of living of the ‘citizens’ of that ‘homeland’.

After Dr Enos J. Mabuza assumed office of Chief Executive Councillor of the ‘homeland’, negotiations to be granted the second phase of the ‘homeland’s’ development, i.e. self-governing status, began. The leadership of KaNgwane had already repeatedly indicated that the people of KaNgwane were against so-called independence. The apartheid government of South Africa was however reluctant to grant self-governing status to KaNgwane. They wanted to do so on condition that KaNgwane thereafter opt for Pretoria's offer of independence.

The leadership of KaNgwane refused to accept such a condition, and request after request for self-governing status received no positive responses from Pretoria. Pretoria sought to punish KaNgwane for its refusal to co-operate with plans to make ‘homelands’ independent, and KaNgwane began to experience extreme under-funding.

But the Inyandza National Movement had politicised the people. Weekly prayer meetings and rallies were organised. The leadership of the Inyandza National Movement intensified the call for the unbanning of the ANC and other political organisations. Pretoria's call for independence was rejected completely. The people were mobilised so that when Pretoria refused to grant self-governing status to KaNgwane, they stood up and defended their rights. They did not stand up because they believed in the ‘homelands’. They never desired to opt for independence but to fight until South Africa became free from the shackles of apartheid. That is why the capital of KaNgwane in Louieville was just a temporary structure. There was no point in building massive and magnificent structures.

After some time without responding at all to the intensified mobilisation, the government of South Africa found another way to force independence on KaNgwane: it announced the incorporation of KaNgwane territory and Ingwavuma region of the then ‘homeland’ of KwaZulu into the Kingdom of Swaziland, the so-called land deal between the government of the Republic of South Africa and the Kingdom of Swaziland.

== Leaders of KaNgwane ==
Tenure	Incumbent	Notes
KaNgwane (April 1976 to 30 September 1977: Swazi Territorial Authority)
23 April 1976 to 23 June 1977	Mokholoshi Dhlamini, chief executive officer
23 June 1977 to 18 June 1982	Enos John Mabuza, chief executive officer, from 1 October 1977: chief executive councillor	1 October 1977: establishment as a homeland with a legislative assembly under the new name "KaNgwane"
KaNgwane (homeland status suspended)
18 June 1982 to 9 December 1982	N.J. Badenhorst, administrator
KaNgwane (homeland status restored)
9 December 1982 to 31 August 1984	Enos John Mabuza, chief executive councillor
KaNgwane (self-rule)
31 August 1984 to 1 April 1991	Enos John Mabuza, chief minister
15 April 1991 to 26 April 1994	Mangisi Cephas Zitha, chief minister
KaNgwane reintegrated into South Africa on 27 April 1994

== Districts in 1991 ==
Districts of the province and population at the 1991 census.

- Eerstehoek: 192,115
- Nkomazi: 276,965
- Nsikazi: 310,160

== Bibliography ==
- „Informa” April 1981 vol XXVIII No 3 (The Department of Foreign Affairs and Information of RSA, newspaper)
