= Bantustan =

Territory under apartheid in South Africa

Map of South Africa and South West Africa (now Namibia). This map shows the bantustans that were present in both territories. Non-bantustan territories South West Africa South Africa Bantustan territories (South West Africa) Kaokoland Ovamboland Damaraland Kavangoland East Caprivi Bushmanland Hereroland Rehoboth Tswanaland Namaland Bantustan territories (South Africa) KwaNdebele Lebowa Gazankulu KaNgwane KwaZulu QwaQwa Nominally independent Bantustans Transkei Bophuthatswana Venda Ciskei

A Bantustan (also known as a Bantu homeland, a black homeland, a black state or simply known as a homeland; Afrikaans: Bantoestan or tuisland) was a territory that the National Party administration of the Union of South Africa (1910–1961) and later the Republic of South Africa (1961–1994) set aside for black inhabitants of South Africa and South West Africa (now Namibia), as a part of its policy of apartheid.

The term, first used in the late 1940s, was coined from Bantu (meaning "people" in some of the Bantu languages) and -stan (a suffix meaning "land" in Persian and other Persian-influenced languages). It subsequently came to be regarded as a disparaging term by some critics of the apartheid-era government's homelands. The Pretoria government established ten Bantustans in South Africa, and ten in neighbouring South West Africa (then under South African administration), for the purpose of concentrating the members of designated ethnic groups, thus making each of those territories ethnically homogeneous as the basis for creating autonomous nation states for South Africa's different black ethnic groups. Under the Bantu Homelands Citizenship Act of 1970, the government stripped black South Africans of their South African citizenship, depriving them of their few remaining political and civil rights in South Africa, and declared them to be citizens of these homelands.

The government of South Africa declared that four of the South African Bantustans were independent—Transkei, Bophuthatswana, Venda, and Ciskei (the so-called "TBVC States"), but this declaration was never recognised by anti-apartheid forces in South Africa or by any international government. Other Bantustans (like KwaZulu, Lebowa, and QwaQwa) were assigned "autonomy" but never granted "independence". In South West Africa, Ovamboland, Kavangoland, and East Caprivi were declared to be self-governing, with a handful of other ostensible homelands never being given autonomy. An Interim Constitution effectively abolished the Bantustans with the complete end of apartheid in South Africa in 1994.

== Creation ==
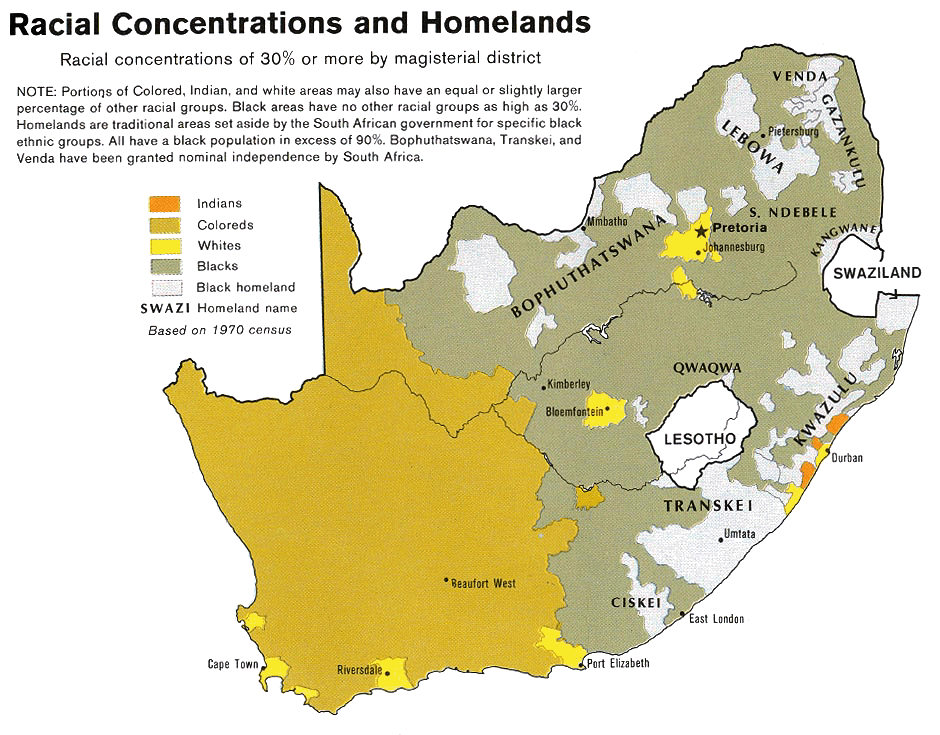
Racial-demographic map of South Africa published by the CIA in 1979 with data from the 1970 South African census

Beginning in 1913, successive white-minority South African governments established "reserves" for the black population in order to racially segregate them from the white population, similar to the creation of Indian reservations in the United States. The Natives Land Act, 1913 limited blacks to seven percent of the land in the country. In 1936 the government planned to raise this to 13.6 percent of the land, but it was slow to purchase land and this plan was not fully implemented.

When the National Party came to power in 1948, Minister for Native Affairs (and later Prime Minister of South Africa) Hendrik Frensch Verwoerd built on this, introducing a series of "grand apartheid" measures such as the Group Areas Acts and the Natives Resettlement Act, 1954 that reshaped South African society such that whites would be the demographic majority. The creation of the homelands or Bantustans was a central element of this strategy, as the long-term goal was to make the Bantustans independent. As a result, blacks would lose their South African citizenship and voting rights, allowing whites to remain in control of South Africa.

The term "Bantustan" for the Bantu homelands was intended to draw a parallel with the creation of Pakistan and India ("Hindustan"), which had taken place just a few months before at the end of 1947, and was coined by supporters of the policy. However, it quickly became a pejorative term, with the National Party preferring the term "homelands". As Nelson Mandela explained in a 1959 article:

The newspapers have christened the Nationalists' plan as one for "Bantustans". The hybrid word is, in many ways, extremely misleading. It relates to the partitioning of India, after the reluctant departure of the British, and as a condition thereof, into two separate States, Hindustan and Pakistan. There is no real parallel with the Nationalists' proposals, for (a) India and Pakistan constitute two completely separate and politically independent States, (b) Muslims enjoy equal rights in India; Hindus enjoy equal rights in Pakistan, (c) Partition was submitted to and approved by both parties, or at any rate fairly widespread and influential sections of each. The Government's plans do not envisage the partitioning of this country into separate, self-governing States. They do not envisage equal rights, or any rights at all, for Africans outside the reserves. Partition has never been approved of by Africans and never will be. For that matter it has never been really submitted to or approved of by the Whites. The term "Bantustan" is therefore a complete misnomer, and merely tends to help the Nationalists perpetrate a fraud.

The Afrikaner view was:

"While apartheid was an ideology born of the will to survive or, put differently, the fear of extinction, Afrikaner leaders differed on how best to implement it. While some were satisfied with segregationist policies placing them at the top of a social and economic hierarchy, others truly believed in the concept of 'separate but equal'. For the latter, the ideological justification for the classification, segregation, and denial of political rights was the plan to set aside special land reserves for black South Africans, later called 'bantustans' or 'homelands'. Each ethnic group would have its own state with its own political system and economy, and each would rely on its own labour force. These independent states would then coexist alongside white South Africa in a spirit of friendship and collaboration. In their own areas, black citizens would enjoy full rights."

Verwoerd argued that the Bantustans were the "original homes" of the black peoples of South Africa. In 1951, the government of Daniel François Malan introduced the Bantu Authorities Act to establish "homelands" allocated to the country's black ethnic groups. These amounted to 13% of the country's land, the remainder being reserved for the white population. The homelands were run by cooperative tribal leaders, while uncooperative chiefs were forcibly deposed. Over time, a ruling black elite emerged with a personal and financial interest in the preservation of the homelands. While this aided the homelands' political stability to an extent, their position was still entirely dependent on South African support.

The role of the homelands was expanded in 1959 with the passage of the Bantu Self-Government Act, which set out a plan called "Separate Development". This enabled the homelands to establish themselves in the long term as self-governing territories and ultimately as nominally fully "independent" states.

This process was to be achieved in a series of four major steps for each homeland:

- The unification of the reserves set aside for the various "tribes" (officially called "nations" since 1959) under a single "Territorial Authority"
- The establishment of a legislative assembly for each homeland with limited powers of self-rule
- The establishment of the homeland as a "self-governing territory"
- The granting of full nominal independence to the homeland

This general framework was not in each case followed in a clear-cut way, but often with a number of intermediate and overlapping steps.

The homeland of Transkei served in many regards as a "testing ground" for apartheid policies; its institutional development started already before the 1959 act, and its attainment of self-government and independence were therefore implemented earlier than for the other homelands.

This plan was stepped up under Verwoerd's successor as prime minister, John Vorster, as part of his "enlightened" approach to apartheid. However, the true intention of this policy was to fulfill Verwoerd's original plan to make South Africa's blacks nationals of the homelands rather than of South Africa—thus removing the few rights they still had as citizens. The homelands were encouraged to opt for independence, as this would greatly reduce the number of black citizens of South Africa. The process of creating the legal framework for this plan was completed by the Black Homelands Citizenship Act of 1970, which formally designated all black South Africans as citizens of the homelands, even if they lived in "white South Africa", and cancelled their South African citizenship, and the Bantu Homelands Constitution Act of 1971, which provided a general blueprint for the stages of constitutional development of all homelands (except Transkei) from the establishment of Territorial Authorities up to full independence.

By 1984, all ten homelands in South Africa had attained self-government and four of them (Transkei, Bophuthatswana, Venda and Ciskei) had been declared fully independent between 1976 and 1981.

The following table shows the time-frame of the institutional and legal development of the ten South African Bantustans in light of the above-mentioned four major steps:

Homeland	Tribe/Nation	Territorial authority	Legislative assembly	Self- government	Nominal independence	Notes
Transkei	Xhosa	1956	1963	1963	1976	A forerunner of the Territorial Authority and the Legislative Assembly existed since 1931 under the name "United Transkeian Territories General Council".
Bophuthatswana	Tswana	1961	1971	1972	1977	The Territorial Authority established in 1961 was reorganised in 1968.
Venda	Venda	1962	1971	1973	1979	The Territorial Authority established in 1962 was reorganised in 1969.
Ciskei	Xhosa	1961	1971	1972	1981	A forerunner of the Territorial Authority and the Legislative Assembly previously existed from 1934 to 1955 under the name "Ciskeian General Council". The Territorial Authority established in 1961 was reorganised in 1968.
Lebowa	Northern Sotho (Pedi)	1962	1971	1972	—	The Territorial Authority established in 1962 was reorganised in 1969.
Gazankulu	Tsonga (Shangaan)	1962	1971	1973	—	The Territorial Authority established in 1962 was reorganised in 1969.
QwaQwa	Southern Sotho	1969	1971	1974	—	
KwaZulu	Zulu	1970	1972	1977	—	
KwaNdebele	Ndebele	1977	1979	1981	—	
KaNgwane	Swazi	1976	1977	1984	—	The homeland status was temporarily suspended between June and December 1982.

In parallel with the creation of the homelands, South Africa's black population was subjected to a massive programme of forced relocation. It has been estimated that 3.5 million people were forced from their homes from the 1960s through the 1980s, many being resettled in the Bantustans.

The government made clear that its ultimate aim was the total removal of the black population from South Africa. Connie Mulder, the Minister of Plural Relations and Development, told the House of Assembly on 7 February 1978:

If our policy is taken to its logical conclusion as far as the black people are concerned, there will be not one black man with South African citizenship ... Every black man in South Africa will eventually be accommodated in some independent new state in this honourable way and there will no longer be an obligation on this Parliament to accommodate these people politically.

But this goal was not achieved. Only a minority (about 39% in 1986) of South Africa's black population lived in the Bantustans; the remainder lived in South Africa proper, many in townships, shanty-towns and slums on the outskirts of South African cities.

== International recognition ==
Bantustans within the borders of South Africa were classified as "self-governing" or "independent". In theory, self-governing Bantustans had control over many aspects of their internal functioning but were not yet sovereign nations. Independent Bantustans (Transkei, Bophuthatswana, Venda and Ciskei; also known as the TBVC states) were intended to be fully sovereign. These areas received little attention from the colonial and later South African governments however, and were still very undeveloped. This greatly decreased these states' ability to govern and made them very reliant on the South African government.

Throughout the existence of the independent Bantustans, South Africa remained the only country to recognise their independence. The South African government lobbied for their recognition. In 1976, leading up to a United States House of Representatives resolution urging the President not to recognise Transkei, the South African government intensely lobbied lawmakers to oppose the bill. Arbitrary and unrecognized amateur radio call signs were created for the independent states and QSL cards were sent by operators using them, but the International Telecommunication Union never accepted these stations as legitimate. Each TBVC state extended recognition to the other independent Bantustans while South Africa showed its commitment to the notion of TBVC sovereignty by building embassies in the TBVC capitals.

== Life in the Bantustans ==
The Bantustans were generally poor, with few local employment opportunities. However, some opportunities did exist for advancement for blacks and some advances in education and infrastructure were made. The four Bantustans which attained nominal independence (Transkei, Bophuthatswana, Venda, and Ciskei) repealed all apartheid legislation.

Laws in the Bantustans differed from those in South Africa proper. The South African elite often took advantage of these differences, for example by constructing large casinos, such as Sun City in the homeland of Bophuthatswana.

Bophuthatswana also possessed deposits of platinum, and other natural resources, which made it the wealthiest of the Bantustans.

Bantustan leaders were widely perceived as collaborators with the apartheid system, although some were successful in acquiring a following. Most homeland leaders had an ambivalent stance regarding the independence of their homelands: a majority was sceptical, remained cautious and avoided a definite decision, some outright rejected it due to their rejection of "separate development" and a professed commitment to "opposing apartheid from within the system", whilst others believed that nominal independence could serve to consolidate their power bases (to an even higher degree than the status they enjoyed as rulers of self-governing homelands) and presented an opportunity to build a society relatively free from racial discrimination. The leaders of the Bantustans, despite their collaboration with the apartheid regime, occasionally criticized the South African government's racial policies and called for the repeal or softening of apartheid laws (most of which were repealed in nominally independent states). Various plans for a federal solution were at times mooted, both by the Bantustan governments and by opposition parties in South Africa as well as circles inside the white ruling National Party.

== Later developments ==
In January 1985, State President P. W. Botha declared that blacks in South Africa proper would no longer be deprived of South African citizenship in favour of Bantustan citizenship and that black citizens within the independent Bantustans could reapply for South African citizenship; F. W. de Klerk stated on behalf of the National Party during the 1987 general election that "every effort to turn the tide [of black workers] streaming into the urban areas failed. It does not help to bluff ourselves about this. The economy demands the permanent presence of the majority of blacks in urban areas... They cannot stay in South Africa year after year without political representation." In March 1990, de Klerk, who succeeded Botha as State President in 1989, announced that his government would not grant independence to any more Bantustans.

However, these remarks were not meant as a rejection of the Bantustan system in general: the goal of the apartheid regime during the second half of the 1980s was to "modernize" the organisational framework of apartheid while leaving its fundamental principles, including the homelands, unchanged.

The government was forced to accept the permanent presence of blacks in urban areas as well as the practical unfeasibility of the hitherto very strict forms of "influx control" (replacing it by "softer" means of control), not to mention the impossibility of a total removal of all blacks to the homelands even in the long run. It was hoping to "pacify" the black urban population by developing various plans to confer upon them limited rights at the local level (but not the upper levels of government). Furthermore, the urban (and rural) residential areas remained segregated based on race in accordance with the Group Areas Act.

"Separate development" as a principle remained in force, and the apartheid regime went on to rely on the Bantustans as one of the main pillars of its policy in dealing with the black population. Until 1990, attempts continued to urge self-governing homelands to opt for independence (e.g. Lebowa, Gazankulu and KwaZulu), and on occasion, the governments of self-governing homelands (e.g. KwaNdebele) themselves expressed interest in obtaining eventual independence.

It was also contemplated in circles of the ruling National Party to create additional nominally independent entities in the urban areas in the form of "independent" black "city-states".

The long-term vision during this time was the creation of some form of a multi-racial "confederation of South African states" with a common citizenship, but separated into racially defined areas. Plans were made (of which only very few were realised) for the development of different "joint" institutions charged with mutual consultation, deliberation and a number of executive functions in relation to "general affairs" common to all population groups, insofar as these institutions would pose no threat to apartheid and the preservation of overall white rule. This "confederation" would include the so-called "common area"—meaning the bulk of South African territory outside of the homelands—under continued white-minority rule and limited power-sharing arrangements with the segregated Coloured and Indian/Asian population groups, the independent and self-governing homelands as well as possible additional black entities in urban areas.

From 1990 to 1994, these "confederational" ideas were in principle still entertained by large parts of the National Party (and in various forms also by certain parties and groups of the white liberal opposition), but their overtly race-based foundations gradually became less pronounced in the course of the negotiations to end apartheid, and the focus shifted to securing "minority rights" (having in mind primarily the white population in particular) after an expected handover of power to the black majority. Federalist plans also met with support from some homeland governments and parties, most importantly the Inkatha Freedom Party, which was the ruling party of KwaZulu. But since especially the African National Congress made it clear that the principles of "one man - one vote" and a unitary state were non-negotiable, confederal schemes were eventually dropped. Because of this, the Inkatha Freedom Party threatened to boycott the April 1994 general election that ended apartheid and decided only in the last minute to participate in them after concessions had been made to them and as well as to the still-ruling National Party and several white opposition groups.

In the period leading up to the elections in 1994, several leaders in the independent and self-governing homelands (e.g. in Boputhatswana), who did not wish to relinquish their power, vehemently opposed the dismantling of the Bantustans and, in doing so, received support from white far-right parties, sections of the apartheid state apparatus and radical pro-apartheid groups like the Afrikaner Weerstandsbeweging.

== Dissolution ==
With the demise of the apartheid regime in South Africa in 1994, all Bantustans (both nominally independent and self-governing) were dismantled and their territories reincorporated into the Republic of South Africa with effect from 27 April 1994 (the day on which the Interim Constitution, which formally ended apartheid, came into force and the first democratic elections began) in terms of section 1(2) and Schedule 1 of the Constitution of the Republic of South Africa, 1993 ("Interim Constitution").

The drive to achieve this was spearheaded by the African National Congress (ANC) as a central element of its programme of reform. Reincorporation was mostly achieved peacefully, although there was some resistance from the local elites, who stood to lose out on the opportunities for wealth and political power provided by the homelands. The dismantling of the homelands of Bophuthatswana and Ciskei was particularly difficult. In Ciskei, South African security forces had to intervene in March 1994 to defuse a political crisis.

From 1994, most parts of the country were constitutionally redivided into new provinces.

Nevertheless, many leaders of former Bantustans or Homelands have had a role in South African politics since their abolition. Some had entered their own parties into the first non-racial election while others joined the ANC. Mangosuthu Buthelezi was chief minister of his KwaZulu homeland from 1976 until 1994. In post-apartheid South Africa he has served as president of the Inkatha Freedom Party and Minister of Home Affairs. Bantubonke Holomisa, who was a general in the homeland of Transkei from 1987, has served as the president of the United Democratic Movement since 1997. General Constand Viljoen, an Afrikaner who served as chief of the South African Defence Force, sent 1,500 of his militiamen to protect Lucas Mangope and to contest the termination of Bophuthatswana as a homeland in 1994. He founded the Freedom Front in 1994. Lucas Mangope, former chief of the Motsweda Ba hurutshe-Boo-Manyane tribe of the Tswana and head of Bophuthatswana is president of the United Christian Democratic Party, effectively a continuation of the ruling party of the homeland. Oupa Gqozo, the last ruler of Ciskei, entered his African Democratic Movement in the 1994 elections but was unsuccessful. The Dikwankwetla Party, which ruled Qwaqwa, remains a force in the Maluti a Phofung council where it is the largest opposition party. The Ximoko Party, which ruled Gazankulu, has a presence in local government in Giyani. Similarly, the former KwaNdebele chief minister George Mahlangu and others formed the Sindawonye Progressive Party which is one of the major opposition parties in Thembisile Hani Local Municipality and Dr JS Moroka Local Municipality (encompassing the territory of the former homeland).

== List of Bantustans ==
=== Bantustans in South Africa ===
Map of the black homelands in South Africa at the end of apartheid in 1994

The homelands are listed below with the ethnic group for which each homeland was designated. Four were nominally independent (the so-called TBVC states of the Transkei, Bophuthatswana, Venda and the Ciskei). The other six had limited self-government:

==== Nominally independent states ====
Bantustan	Capital	Ethnic group	Self-government years	Nominal independence years
Transkei	Umtata	Xhosa	1963–1976	1976–1994
Bophuthatswana	Mmabatho (1977–1994); Mafeking (provisionally, until 1977)	Tswana	1972–1977	1977–1994
Venda	Thohoyandou (1979–1994); Sibasa (provisionally, until 1979)	Venda	1973–1979	1979–1994
Ciskei	Bisho (1981–1994); Zwelitsha (provisionally, until 1981)	Xhosa	1972–1981	1981–1994

==== Self-governing entities ====
Bantustan	Capital	Tribe	Years
Lebowa	Lebowakgomo (1974–1994); Seshego (provisionally, until 1974)	Northern Sotho (Pedi)	1972–1994
Gazankulu	Giyani	Tsonga (Shangaan)	1973–1994
QwaQwa	Phuthaditjhaba (until 1974 called Witsieshoek)	Southern Sotho	1974–1994
KwaZulu	Ulundi (1980–1994); Nongoma (provisionally, until 1980)	Zulus	1977–1994
KwaNdebele	KwaMhlanga (1986–1994); Siyabuswa (provisionally, until 1986)	Ndebele	1981–1994
KaNgwane	Louieville; Schoemansdal (provisionally, until the mid-1980s)	Swazi	1984–1994

The first Bantustan was the Transkei, under the leadership of Chief Kaiser Daliwonga Matanzima in the Cape Province for the Xhosa nation. KwaZulu, for the Zulu nation in the Province of Natal, was headed by a member of the Zulu royal family chief Mangosuthu ("Gatsha") Buthelezi in the name of the Zulu king.

Lesotho and Eswatini (formerly known as Swaziland) were not Bantustans; they have been independent countries and former British protectorates. These countries are mostly or entirely surrounded by South African territory and are almost totally dependent on South Africa. They have never had any formal political dependence on South Africa and were recognised as sovereign states by the international community from the time they were granted their independence by the UK in the 1960s.

=== Bantustans in South West Africa ===
==== Homelands ====
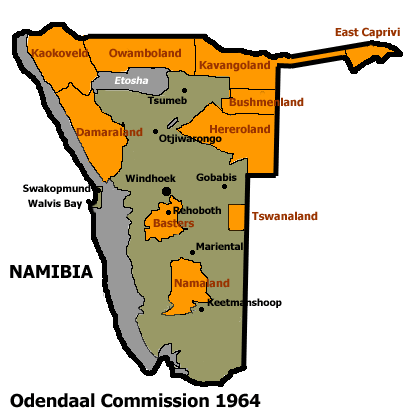
Allocation of land to bantustans according to the Odendaal Plan. Grey is Etosha National Park

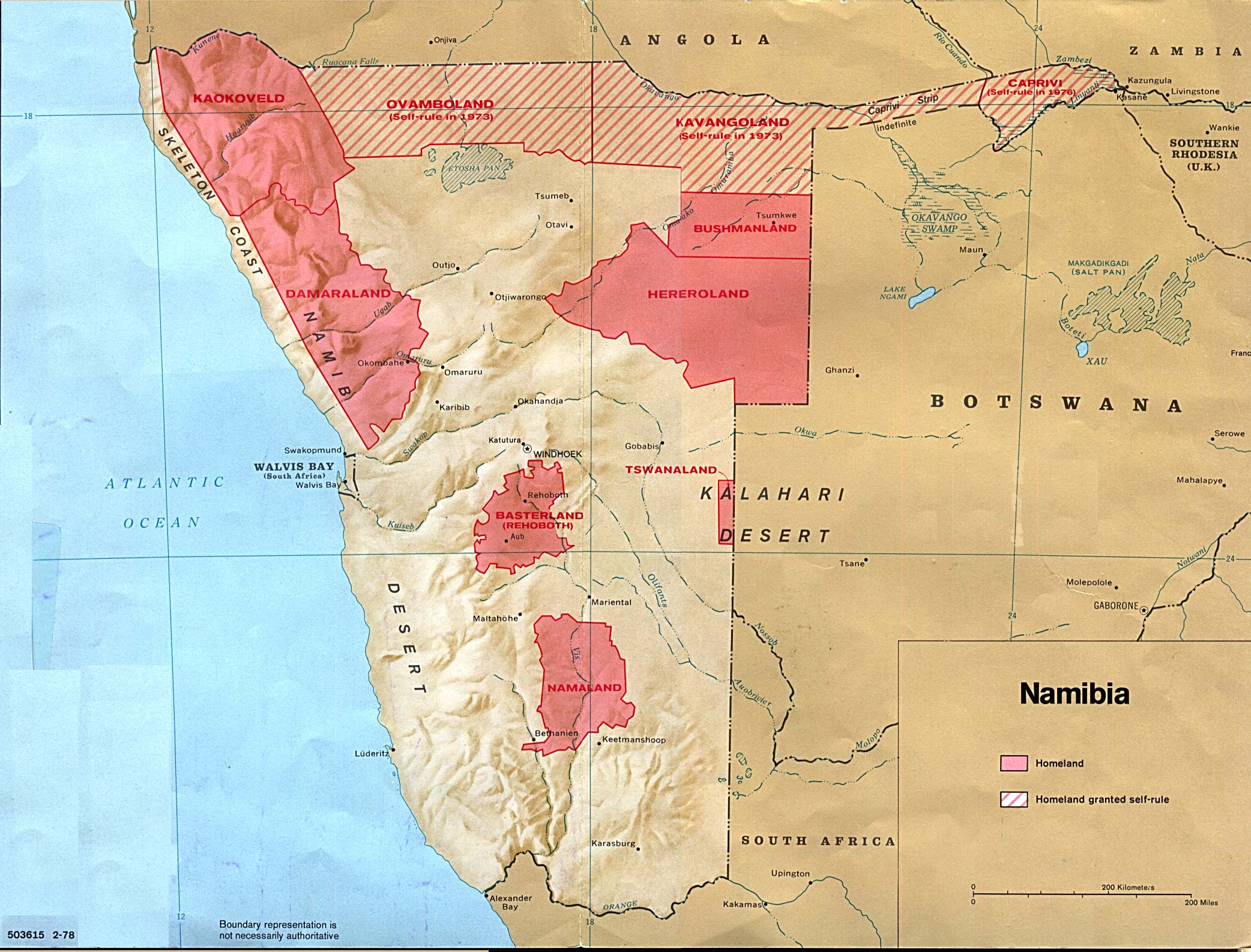
Map of the black homelands in Namibia as of 1978

In the 1960s, South Africa, which was administering South West Africa under a League of Nations mandate, came under increased international pressure regarding its minority white rule over the majority black population. The solution envisaged by South Africa—the Odendaal Plan—was to separate the white and the non-white population, grant self-government to the isolated black territories, and thus make whites the majority population in the vast remainder of the country. Moreover, it was envisaged that, by separating each ethnic group and confining people by law to their restricted areas, discrimination by race would automatically disappear. The inspiration for the Odendaal Plan came, in part, from South African anthropologists.

The demarcated territories were called the bantustans, and the remainder of the land was called the Police Zone. Forthwith, all non-white people employed in the Police Zone became migrant workers, and pass laws were established to police movement in and out of the bantustans.

The combined territory of all bantustans was roughly equal in size to the Police Zone. However, all bantustans were predominantly rural and excluded major towns. All harbours, most of the railway network and the tarred road infrastructure, all larger airports, the profitable diamond areas and the national parks were situated in the Police Zone.

Beginning in 1968, following the 1964 recommendations of the commission headed by Fox Odendaal, ten homelands similar to those in South Africa were established in South West Africa (present-day Namibia). The term "Bantustan" is somewhat inappropriate in this context, since some of the peoples involved were Khoisan, not Bantu, and the Rehoboth Basters are a complex case. Of these ten South West African homelands, only three were granted self-government (comparable to the Bantustans in South Africa) between 1973 and 1976.

==== Representative Authorities ====
In July 1980, the system was changed to one of separate governments ("representative authorities") as second-tier administrative units (responsible for a number of affairs like land tenure, agriculture, education up to the level of primary school teachers' training, health services and social welfare and pensions) on the basis of ethnicity only and no longer based on geographically defined areas. Building upon institutions that had already been in existence since 1925 and 1962, respectively, representative authorities were also instituted for the white and Coloured population groups. No such representative authorities were established for the Himba and San peoples (mainly occupying their former homelands of Kaokoland and Bushmanland).

These ethnic second-tier governments were de facto suspended in May 1989, at the start of the transition to independence, and de jure abolished on 21 March 1990 (the day Namibia became independent) in accordance with Schedule 8 of the Constitution of Namibia. The Basters lobbied unsuccessfully to maintain the autonomous status of Rehoboth, which had previously been autonomous under German rule, and Basterland. In the former Bantustan of East Caprivi, Lozi nationalists in 1999 launched an unsuccessful insurgency in an attempt to gain independence from Namibia.

The land in the Bantustan territories fell to the Namibian state, and is today called "Communal Areas".

==== Homelands (until 1980) / Representative Authorities (1980–1989/1990) ====
Bantustan	Capital	Most represented tribe	Legislative Council established	Self-government	Representative Authority years
Ovamboland	Ondangua	Ovambo	1968	1973	1980–1989 (1990)
Kavangoland	Rundu	Kavango	1970	1973	1980–1989 (1990)
East Caprivi	Katima Mulilo	Lozi	1972	1976	1980–1989 (1990)
Namaland	Keetmanshoop	Nama	1976	—	1980–1989 (1990)
Rehoboth	Rehoboth	Baster	1977	—	1980–1989 (1990)
Damaraland	Welwitschia	Damara	1977	—	1980–1989 (1990)
Hereroland	Okakarara	Herero	—	—	1980–1989 (1990)
Tswanaland	Aminuis	Tswana	—	—	1980–1989 (1990)
Bushmanland	Tsumkwe	San	—	—	—
Kaokoland	Ohopoho	Himba	—	—	—

== Usage in non-South African contexts ==
The term "bantustan" has become a generic term to refer in a disapproving sense to any area in which people are forced to live without full civil and political rights.

=== Palestinian enclaves ===
In the Middle East, the Palestinian enclaves in the West Bank, as well as the Gaza Strip, are often described as bantustans by critics of Israel's policies in the Palestinian territories. The term is used to refer to either the proposed areas in the West Bank designated for Palestinians under a variety of U.S. and Israeli-led proposals to end the Israeli–Palestinian conflict, or the existing 165 "islands" which first took official form as Areas A and B under the 1995 Oslo II Accord. The Israeli-U.S. peace plans, including the Allon Plan, the Drobles World Zionist Organization plan, Menachem Begin's plan, Benjamin Netanyahu's "Allon Plus" plan, the 2000 Camp David Summit, and Sharon's vision of a Palestinian state have proposed an enclave-type territory, as has the 2020 Trump peace plan. This has been criticized as the "Bantustan option".

=== Other examples ===
In the Indian subcontinent, the Sinhalese government of Sri Lanka has been accused of turning Tamil areas into "bantustans". The term has also been used to refer to the living conditions of Dalits in India.

In Nigeria, Catholic bishop Matthew Hassan Kukah has referred to southern Kaduna State as "one huge Bantustan of government neglect."

In Canada and the United States, Indian reserves and Indian reservations are often compared to Bantustans due to the shared relationship between the countries' systems of racial segregation.

== See also ==
- Bedoon
- Palestinian enclaves, often called bantustans
- Indian Reservation
- Māori electorates
- Apartheid
- Bantu Homelands Citizenship Act, 1970
- Racial segregation
- Volkstaat
- Internal passport
- Ethnic cleansing
- War Relocation Authority
- Oslo Accords
- Hamastan

== Bibliography ==
- Adam, Heribert; Moodley, Kogila (2005). Seeking Mandela: Peacemaking Between Israelis and Palestinians. Psychology Press. p. 104. ISBN 978-1-84472-130-6.
- Cook, Catherine; Hanieh, Adam (2006). "35: Walling in People Walling out Sovereignty". In Beinin, Joel; Stein, Rebecca L. (eds.). The Struggle for Sovereignty: Palestine and Israel, 1993-2005. Stanford University Press. pp. 338–347. ISBN 978-0-8047-5365-4.
- Harris, Brice Jr (Summer 1984). "The South Africanization of Israel". Arab Studies Quarterly. 6 (3): 169–189. JSTOR 41857718.
- Kamrava, Mehran (2016). The Impossibility of Palestine: History, Geography, and the Road Ahead. Yale University Press. ISBN 978-0-300-22085-8.
- Loewenstein, Antony; Moor, Ahmed (25 March 2013). After Zionism: One State for Israel and Palestine. Saqi. p. 14. ISBN 978-0-86356-739-1.
- Srivastava, Mehul (17 June 2020). "Israel's annexation plan: the 'existential threat' to Palestinian dreams". Financial Times. Archived from the original on 10 December 2022.
- "Israeli annexation of parts of the Palestinian West Bank would break international law – UN experts call on the international community to ensure accountability". UNHRC. 16 June 2020.
- Usher, Graham (20 May 1999). Dispatches from Palestine: The Rise and Fall of the Oslo Peace Process. University of Alberta. p. 35. ISBN 978-0-7453-1337-5.
