= Badplaas =

Badplaas eBhadini eManzana
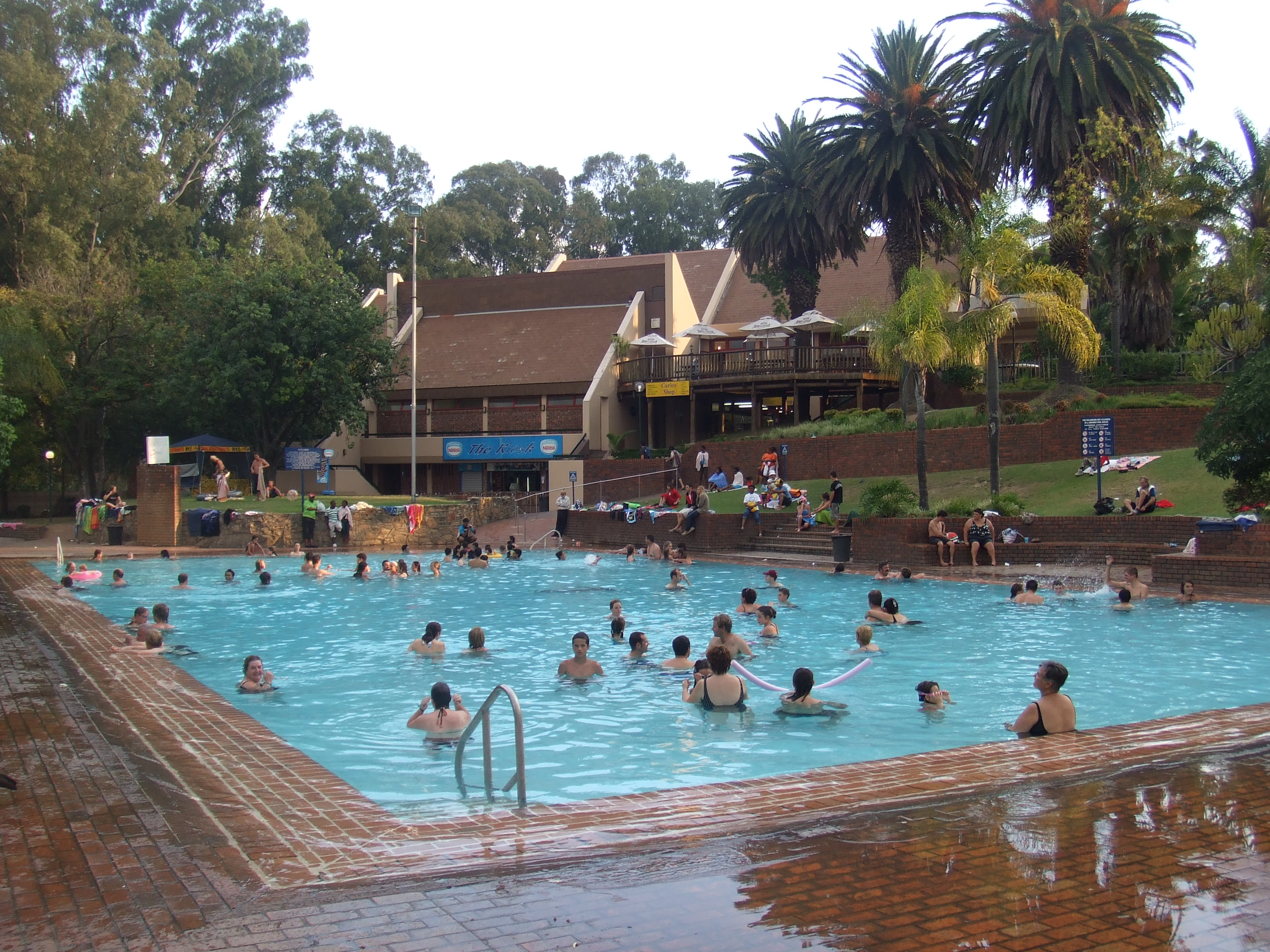
- The main swimming pool at Badplaas

- Location within Mpumalanga Location within South Africa
- Coordinates: 25°57′14″S 30°34′00″E
- Country: South Africa
- Province: Mpumalanga
- District: Gert Sibande
- Municipality: Albert Luthuli
  - Councillor: (ANC)

Area
  - Total: 37.97 km^{2} (14.66 sq mi)
- Elevation: 1,110 m (3,640 ft)

Population (2011)
  - Total: 582
  - Density: 15.3/km^{2} (39.7/sq mi)

Racial makeup (2011)
  - Black African: 62.5%
  - Coloured: 2.1%
  - Indian/Asian: 3.3%
  - White: 31.1%
  - Other: 1.0%

First languages (2011)
  - Swazi: 40.0%
  - Afrikaans: 31.7%
  - English: 12.8%
  - Zulu: 5.3%
  - Other: 10.2%
- Time zone: UTC+2 (SAST)
- Postal code (street): 1190
- PO box: 1190
- Area code: 017

Badplaas, current officially named eManzana, is a small town on the R38 road in eastern Mpumalanga, South Africa. The town covers a total area of 14.66 square metres per miles which is equal 37.96 km squared of land. It was established in 1876 on the Seekoeispruit, in the foothills of the Dlomodlomo Mountains (meaning "place of much thunder"), at the site of a sulphur spring that delivers ±30,000 litres of hot water (at ±50 °C) per hour. Multiple sulphur springs are found around the area, including the one situated at Mkhingoma on the Mkhomazana river.

== History ==
Swazi tribesmen were the first to discover the spring and called it "eManzana", which means "healing waters". It has been said that in about 1876 the Swazi chief presented this spring, in gratitude, to a hunter, Jacob de Clerq, who subsequently built a store nearby and developed the spring to allow for visitors’ use due to its believed medicinal properties.

== Recreation ==
The spring became very popular when gold was discovered in the De Kaap Valley (near Barberton). Prospectors would visit there on weekends to get away from their strenuous work of digging for gold. On 6 November 1893, the government claimed the springs to develop a health resort for public use in perpetuity. It was proclaimed in December 1947. The Protea Group managed this Aventura Resort for a time, but the resort has now been purchased by the Forever Resorts Group.

== Schools ==
- Sunduza Primary School
- Izithandani Primary School
- Engabezweni Secondary School
- Laerskool Badplaas
- Mountain Valley College
