= List of airports by ICAO code: FA-FM =

List of airports by ICAO code: A - B - C - D - EB-EG - EH-EY - FA-FM - FN-FZ - G - H - ~~I~~ - J - KA-KH - KI-KP - KR-KZ - LA-LJ - LK-LZ - M - N - O - P - Q - R - S - T - U - V - W - ~~X~~ - Y - Z

The airports whose ICAO codes start with 'F' are in Central Africa, Southern Africa, and the Indian Ocean.

== FA – South Africa ==
Also see airport category and list.

ICAO	IATA	Airport name	Community	Province	Coordinates	Notes
FAAA		Atlantic Aerodrome			33°35′17″S 018°37′05″E	
FAAB	ALJ	Alexander Bay Airport	Alexander Bay	Northern Cape	28°34′24″S 016°32′06″E	Closed
FAAE		Aberdeen Airport			32°27′59″S 024°03′50″E	
FAAF		Andrew's Field Airport			34°45′48″S 020°02′11″E	
FAAG	AGZ	Aggeneys Airport	Aggeneys	Northern Cape	29°16′54″S 018°48′50″E	
FAAL		Alldays Airport			22°40′44″S 029°03′19″E	
FAAM		Amsterdam Airport			26°38′02″S 030°36′20″E	
FAAN		Aliwal North Airport	Aliwal North	Eastern Cape	30°41′00″S 026°44′00″E	
FAAP		Aviator's Paradise Field			25°41′34″S 027°46′58″E	
FAAR		Arathusa Safari Lodge Airport			24°44′26″S 031°31′05″E	
FAAS		Ashton Airport			33°50′17″S 020°02′59″E	
FABA		Microland Flight Park			25°58′35″S 028°23′20″E	
FABB		Brakpan Airport			26°14′17″S 028°18′21″E	
FABD		Burghersdorp Airport			30°58′51″S 026°18′26″E	
FABE	BIY	Bhisho Airport	Bhisho	Eastern Cape	32°53′42″S 027°17′06″E	
FABF		Barkly East Airport			30°58′15″S 027°36′36″E	
FABG		Buffelshoek Airport			24°42′09″S 031°35′16″E	
FABH		Belfast Airport			25°39′31″S 030°02′30″E	
FABK		Bushmans Kloof Airport			32°02′06″S 019°02′37″E	
FABL	BFN	Bram Fischer International Airport	Bloemfontein	Free State	29°05′38″S 026°18′14″E	
FABM	BHM	Bethlehem Airport	Bethlehem	Free State	28°15′00″S 028°20′00″E	
FABO		Bothaville Airport			27°22′00″S 026°38′00″E	
FABP		Black Rock Airport			27°07′47″S 022°50′47″E	
FABR		Barberton Airport			25°43′03″S 030°58′30″E	
FABS		Brits Airfield			25°31′56″S 027°46′29″E	
FABT		Bethesda Road Airport			31°52′24″S 024°47′49″E	
FABU	UTE	Bultfontein Airfield	Bultfontein	Free State	28°16′21″S 026°08′08″E	
FABV		Brandviei Airport			30°28′04″S 020°28′10″E	
FABW		Karoo Gateway Airport			32°18′00″S 022°40′00″E	
FABX		Beatrix Airport			28°14′42″S 026°46′19″E	
FABZ		Bizana Airport			30°51′37″S 029°51′50″E	
FACA		Monte Carlo Airport			28°48′00″S 027°25′01″E	
FACB		Colesberg Airport			30°44′02″S 025°03′54″E	
FACD	CDO	Cradock Airport	Nxuba	Eastern Cape	32°09′20″S 025°38′45″E	
FACE		Ceres Airport			33°19′00″S 019°25′36″E	
FACF		Saint Francis Field			34°11′16″S 024°49′55″E	
FACG		Caledon Airport			34°15′34″S 019°24′58″E	
FACH		Cookhouse Airport			32°44′41″S 025°47′47″E	
FACI		Citrusdal Airport			32°37′11″S 019°00′14″E	
FACK		Christiana Airport			27°52′38″S 025°12′16″E	
FACL		Carolina Airport			26°04′41″S 030°05′33″E	
FACN		Carnarvon Airport	Carnarvon	Northern Cape	30°59′15″S 022°07′50″E	
FACO		Alkantpan Airport			29°54′23″S 022°19′00″E	
FACR		Carltonville Airport			26°22′00″S 027°20′48″E	
FACT	CPT	Cape Town International Airport	Cape Town	Western Cape	33°58′05″S 018°36′17″E	
FACV		Calvinia Airport			31°30′01″S 019°43′33″E	
FACW		Clanwilliam Airport			32°10′36″S 018°52′55″E	
FACX		Cathcart Airport			32°17′14″S 027°08′20″E	
FACY		Stilbaai Airport			34°21′06″S 021°25′29″E	
FADA		De Aar Airport			30°41′32″S 024°01′14″E	
FADB		Dwaalboom Airport			24°48′26″S 026°49′47″E	
FADD		Dundee Airfield	Dundee	KwaZulu-Natal	28°10′59″S 030°13′21″E	
FADG		Dordrecht Airport			31°21′48″S 027°01′54″E	Closed
FADH		Durnacol Airport			28°02′46″S 030°00′23″E	
FADK		Mtubatuba Airport			28°22′06″S 032°14′53″E	
FADL		Delareyville Airport			26°40′45″S 025°28′29″E	
FADM		Kokstad Airport			30°33′23″S 029°24′30″E	
FADN		Air Force Base Durban	Durban	KwaZulu-Natal	29°57′56″S 030°56′57″E	
FADO		Dendron Airport			23°22′50″S 029°19′15″E	
FADP		Darlington Dam Lodge Airport			33°11′00″S 025°11′36″E	
FADQ		Zulu Inyala Airport			27°50′58″S 032°18′35″E	
FADS		De Doorns Airport			33°27′20″S 019°41′04″E	
FADU		Walkerson's Field Airport			25°21′46″S 030°11′16″E	
FADV		Devon Airport			26°21′32″S 028°47′23″E	
FADX		Delta 200 Airport			33°38′58″S 018°28′18″E	
FADY		De Aar Air Base			30°38′11″S 023°55′11″E	
FADZ		Drakensberg Gardens Airport			29°44′33″S 029°16′00″E	
FAEC		Estcourt Airport			29°02′50″S 029°54′38″E	
FAED		Egenburg Airport			29°44′47″S 025°55′14″E	Abandoned
FAEG		Egnep Airport			34°10′17″S 019°03′10″E	
FAEL	ELS	King Phalo Airport	East London	Eastern Cape	33°02′06″S 027°49′18″E	
FAEM	EMG	Empangeni Airport	Empangeni	KwaZulu-Natal	28°43′07″S 031°53′34″E	
FAEN		Entabeni Airport			24°11′36″S 028°44′06″E	
FAEO		Ermelo Airport			26°30′00″S 029°59′00″E	
FAER	ELL	Ellisras Matimba Airport	Lephalale	Limpopo	23°43′36″S 027°41′18″E	
FAES		Eshowe Airport			28°52′49″S 031°27′18″E	
FAET		Elliot Airport			31°18′25″S 027°50′58″E	
FAFB	FCB	Ficksburg Airport	Ficksburg	Free State	28°49′30″S 027°54′30″E	
FAFF		Frankfort Airport			27°17′12″S 028°30′53″E	
FAFG		Flamingo Vlei Airport			30°29′28″S 021°07′18″E	
FAFO		Fort Beaufort Airport			32°47′26″S 026°34′40″E	
FAFR		Fraserburg Airport			31°56′02″S 021°30′09″E	
FAFU		Fraaiuitzicht Airport			27°19′01″S 027°15′00″E	Closed
FAFW		Freeway Airport			25°28′38″S 028°17′24″E	
FAGA		The Grange Airport			30°16′01″S 029°58′01″E	Closed
FAGC	GCJ	Grand Central Airport	Johannesburg	Gauteng	25°59′13″S 028°08′26″E	
FAGG	GRJ	George Airport	George	Western Cape	34°00′24″S 022°22′30″E	
FAGH		Glen Grey Airport			28°50′00″S 029°28′00″E	Closed
FAGI	GIY	Giyani Airport	Giyani	Limpopo	23°17′00″S 030°39′00″E	
FAGJ		Gifvlei Airport			30°22′04″S 020°00′48″E	
FAGL		Groblersdal Kob Airport			25°11′13″S 029°24′12″E	
FAGM	QRA	Rand Airport	Johannesburg	Gauteng	26°14′31″S 028°09′05″E	
FAGO		Gowrie Airport			24°44′14″S 031°33′37″E	
FAGR		Graaff Reinet Airport			32°11′41″S 024°32′28″E	
FAGT		Grahamstown Airport			33°17′00″S 026°30′00″E	
FAGV		Gravelotte Airport			23°54′41″S 030°41′46″E	
FAGW		Magwa Airport			31°23′38″S 029°41′36″E	
FAGY		Greytown Airport			29°07′25″S 030°34′56″E	
FAHA		Harmony Airport			28°04′43″S 026°51′40″E	
FAHB		Hartebeespoortdam Airport			24°30′09″S 028°04′45″E	
FAHC		Howick Airport			29°33′10″S 030°12′40″E	
FAHD		Humansdorp Airport			34°02′12″S 024°47′20″E	
FAHE		Pullenshope Hendrina Airport			25°58′40″S 029°37′08″E	
FAHF		Henry's Flats Airport			33°02′46″S 025°43′01″E	
FAHG		Heidelberg Airport			26°30′30″S 028°23′30″E	
FAHH		Hibberdene Airport			30°35′02″S 030°33′31″E	
FAHI		Halfweg Airport			30°00′48″S 020°08′21″E	
FAHJ		Harding Airport			30°34′28″S 029°54′20″E	
FAHK		Haakdoornboom Airport			25°35′14″S 028°06′57″E	
FAHL	HLW	Hluhluwe Airport	Hluhluwe	KwaZulu-Natal	28°00′30″S 032°16′30″E	
FAHO		Heilbron Airport			27°16′43″S 027°59′44″E	
FAHP		Hoopstad Airport			27°49′18″S 025°55′01″E	
FAHR	HRS	Harrismith Airport	Harrismith	Free State	28°14′00″S 029°06′00″E	
FAHS	HDS	Air Force Base Hoedspruit	Hoedspruit	Limpopo	24°21′17″S 031°03′01″E	
FAHU		HMS Bastard Memorial Airport			30°32′33″S 029°29′56″E	
FAHV		Gariep Dam Airport			30°33′44″S 025°31′48″E	
FAHW		Hazyview Airport			25°03′00″S 031°07′55″E	
FAIA		Itala Airport			27°29′12″S 031°10′16″E	
FAID		Idutywa Airport			32°06′34″S 028°19′02″E	Closed
FAIS		Isithebe Airport			29°06′20″S 031°24′27″E	
FAIV		Ingwavuma Airport			27°07′02″S 032°00′31″E	
FAIW		Indwe Airport			31°29′09″S 027°21′05″E	Closed
FAJC		Jackalberry Airport			24°30′31″S 031°08′32″E	
FAJF		Jagersfontain Airport			29°45′45″S 025°25′59″E	Closed
FAJP		Joubertina Airport			33°49′51″S 023°49′40″E	
FAJV		Jansenville Airport			32°56′21″S 024°40′15″E	
FAKB		Kosibaai Airport			27°01′06″S 032°45′01″E	
FAKD	KXE	Klerksdorp Airport	Klerksdorp	North West	26°52′00″S 026°43′00″E	
FAKE		Keimouth Airport			32°41′50″S 028°21′23″E	
FAKF		Koffee Bay Airport			31°57′26″S 029°10′28″E	
FAKG		Komati Power Station Airport			26°05′36″S 029°27′20″E	
FAKH		Kenhardt Airport			29°19′46″S 021°11′30″E	
FAKI		Kobb Inn Airport			32°26′02″S 028°41′00″E	
FAKK		Kakamas Airport			28°48′31″S 020°38′42″E	
FAKL		Kriel Airport			26°15′04″S 029°11′41″E	
FAKM	KIM	Kimberley Airport	Kimberley	Northern Cape	28°48′06″S 024°45′49″E	
FAKN	MQP	Kruger Mpumalanga International Airport	Mbombela	Mpumalanga	25°23′30″S 031°05′57″E	
FAKO		Komga Airport	Komga	Eastern Cape	32°35′34″S 027°52′33″E	
FAKP	KOP	Komatipoort Airport	Komatipoort	Mpumalanga	25°26′26″S 031°55′49″E	
FAKR		Krugersdorp Airport	Krugersdorp	Gauteng	26°04′54″S 027°43′32″E	
FAKS		Kroonstad Airport	Kroonstad	Free State	27°39′44″S 027°18′46″E	
FAKT		Kitty Hawk Airport			25°51′36″S 028°27′00″E	
FAKU	KMH	Johan Pienaar Airport	Kuruman	Northern Cape	27°27′35″S 023°24′45″E	
FAKV		Koffyfontein Mine			29°26′22″S 024°59′19″E	
FAKW		Kareedouw Airport			33°57′35″S 024°19′24″E	Closed
FAKX		Kenton-on-Sea Airport			33°40′13″S 026°37′50″E	
FAKZ	KLZ	Kleinzee Airport	Kleinzee	Northern Cape	29°40′59″S 017°05′35″E	
FALA	HLA	Lanseria International Airport	Johannesburg	Gauteng	25°56′23″S 027°55′29″E	
FALB		Ladybrand Airport			29°10′52″S 027°27′13″E	
FALC	LMR	Finsch Mine Airport	Lime Acres	Northern Cape	28°21′30″S 023°26′30″E	
FALD		Londolozi Airport			24°44′52″S 031°28′27″E	
FALE	DUR	King Shaka International Airport	Durban	KwaZulu-Natal	29°36′52″S 031°06′59″E	
FALF		Loeriesfontein Airport			30°54′23″S 019°25′31″E	
FALH		Lohathla Air Base			28°02′12″S 023°05′55″E	
FALI		Lichtenburg Airport			26°10′00″S 026°11′00″E	
FALK		Lusikisiki Airport	Lusikisiki	Eastern Cape	31°17′00″S 029°31′00″E	
FALL		Lydenburg Airport			25°06′12″S 030°24′51″E	
FALM	LCD	Air Force Base Makhado	Makhado	Limpopo	23°09′35″S 029°41′47″E	
FALO		Louis Trichardt Airport			23°03′42″S 029°51′53″E	
FALQ		El Mirador Airport			28°59′10″S 029°28′47″E	
FALR		Steytlerville Airport			33°20′13″S 024°19′17″E	
FALS		Somersveld Airport			33°14′46″S 018°28′48″E	
FALW	SDB	Air Force Base Langebaanweg	Langebaan	Western Cape	32°58′08″S 018°09′55″E	
FALY	LAY	Ladysmith Airport	Ladysmith	KwaZulu-Natal	28°34′48″S 029°45′10″E	
FAMA		Matatiele Airport			30°19′20″S 028°47′39″E	
FAMB		Middleburg Airport			25°41′08″S 029°26′26″E	
FAMC		Middleburg 2 Airport			31°32′50″S 025°01′46″E	
FAMD	AAM	Mala Mala Airport	Mala Mala Game Reserve	Mpumalanga	24°49′03″S 031°32′41″E	
FAMF		Malabar Airport			29°00′39″S 023°50′58″E	
FAMG	MGH	Margate Airport	Margate	KwaZulu-Natal	30°51′00″S 030°21′00″E	
FAMH		Musina Airport			22°21′20″S 029°59′10″E	
FAMI		Marble Hall Airport			24°59′30″S 029°17′00″E	
FAMJ		Majuba Power Station Airport			27°04′45″S 029°46′42″E	
FAML		Manyani Game Lodge Airport			25°49′00″S 025°43′00″E	
FAMM	MBD	Mmabatho International	Mmabatho	North West	25°48′27″S 025°32′40″E	
FAMN	LLE	Malelane Airport	Malalane	Mpumalanga	25°28′24″S 031°33′56″E	
FAMO	MZY	Mossel Bay Airport	Mossel Bay	Western Cape	34°09′26″S 022°03′41″E	
FAMP		Madimbo Airport			22°22′29″S 030°52′54″E	
FAMQ		Maclear Airport			31°04′20″S 028°22′34″E	
FAMS	MEZ	Musina Airport	Musina	Limpopo	22°21′20″S 029°59′00″E	
FAMT		Molteno Airport			31°23′23″S 026°20′54″E	
FAMU	MZQ	Mkuze Airport	Mkuze	KwaZulu-Natal	27°37′33″S 032°02′39″E	
FAMW	MZF	Mzamba Airport	Wild Coast	Eastern Cape	31°15′00″S 029°50′00″E	Closed
FAMX		Mbazwana Airport			27°28′53″S 032°35′38″E	
FAMY		Malmesbury Airport			33°29′10″S 018°42′37″E	
FAMZ		Msauli Airport			26°03′00″S 031°01′01″E	Closed
FANA		Nongoma Airport			27°54′50″S 031°39′22″E	
FANC	NCS	Newcastle Airport	Newcastle	KwaZulu-Natal	27°46′22″S 029°58′35″E	
FANG	NGL	Ngala Airfield	Timbavati Private Nature Reserve	Mpumalanga	24°23′20″S 031°19′34″E	
FANH		New Hanover Airport			29°21′22″S 030°31′06″E	
FANL		New Largo Airport			25°58′43″S 028°59′04″E	
FANS	NLP	Nelspruit Airport	Mbombela	Mpumalanga	25°30′08″S 030°54′43″E	
FANV		Nieuwoudtville Airport			31°23′28″S 019°06′21″E	
FANX		Diepkloof Airport			33°20′51″S 018°41′49″E	
FANY		Nylstroom Airport			24°41′08″S 028°25′59″E	
FAOB		Air Force Base Overberg	Bredasdorp	Western Cape	34°33′17″S 020°15′02″E	
FAOD		Odendallsrus Airport			27°52′16″S 026°41′36″E	
FAOF		Olifantshoek Jack Duvenhage Airport			27°57′42″S 022°43′00″E	
FAOH	OUH	Oudtshoorn Airport	Oudtshoorn	Western Cape	33°36′00″S 022°11′00″E	
FAOI		Orient Glider Airfield	Magaliesburg	Gauteng	26°02′22″S 027°35′44″E	
FAOL		Othawa Airport			24°45′29″S 031°24′19″E	
FAON		Ornate Lake-Saint Lucia Airport			28°02′42″S 032°25′31″E	
FAOR	JNB	O. R. Tambo International Airport	Johannesburg	Gauteng	26°08′01″S 028°14′32″E	
FAOT		Ottosdal Airport			26°47′54″S 026°00′01″E	
FAOY		Orkney Airport			26°59′02″S 026°39′05″E	
FAPA	AFD	Port Alfred Airport	Port Alfred	Eastern Cape	33°35′00″S 026°53′00″E	
FAPB		Air Force Base Pietersburg			23°50′43″S 029°27′31″E	Closed
FAPC		Prince Albert Airport			33°12′09″S 022°01′56″E	
FAPD		Pofadder Airport			29°08′30″S 019°24′47″E	
FAPE	PLZ	Chief Dawid Stuurman International Airport	Gqeberha	Eastern Cape	33°59′24″S 025°36′37″E	
FAPF		Piet Retief Airport			27°00′00″S 030°50′36″E	
FAPG	PBZ	Plettenberg Bay Aerodrome	Plettenberg Bay	Western Cape	34°05′17″S 023°19′43″E	
FAPH	PHW	Hendrik Van Eck Airport	Phalaborwa	Limpopo	23°56′10″S 031°09′18″E	
FAPI		Pietersburg Civil Aerodrome	Polokwane	Limpopo	23°55′33″S 029°29′03″E	
FAPJ	JOH	Port St. Johns Airport	Port St. Johns	Eastern Cape	31°37′00″S 029°31′00″E	
FAPK	PRK	Prieska Airport	Prieska	Northern Cape	29°41′01″S 022°46′14″E	
FAPL		Pongola Airport			27°21′42″S 031°36′20″E	
FAPM	PZB	Pietermaritzburg Airport	Pietermaritzburg	KwaZulu-Natal	29°38′48″S 030°23′52″E	
FAPN	NTY	Pilanesberg International Airport	Sun City	North West	25°20′08″S 027°10′18″E	
FAPO		Pilgrims Rest Airport			24°47′07″S 030°47′31″E	
FAPP	PTG	Polokwane International Airport	Polokwane	Limpopo	23°50′43″S 029°27′31″E	
FAPQ		Punda Maria Airport			22°46′12″S 031°00′39″E	
FAPS	PCF	Porchefstroom Airport	Potchefstroom	North West	26°40′16″S 027°04′55″E	
FAPT		Posmaburg Soil Airport			28°20′19″S 023°04′47″E	
FAPU		Pearl East Airport			33°42′39″S 019°01′28″E	
FAPV		Petrusville Airport			30°04′54″S 024°40′47″E	
FAPW		Pietersrus Airport			26°36′22″S 029°19′45″E	
FAPX		Paradise Beach Airport			34°06′05″S 024°53′04″E	
FAPY		Parys Airport			26°53′14″S 027°30′19″E	
FAPZ		Progress Airport			33°55′35″S 025°22′19″E	
FAQF		Pomfret Airport			25°50′52″S 023°32′14″E	
FAQT	UTW	Queenstown Airport	Queenstown	Eastern Cape	31°55′00″S 026°53′00″E	
FARA		Petit Airport			26°05′05″S 028°23′25″E	
FARB	RCB	Richards Bay Airport	Richards Bay	KwaZulu-Natal	28°44′25″S 032°05′36″E	
FARD		Riversdale Airport			34°06′42″S 021°15′46″E	
FARG		Rustenburg Airfield	Rustenburg	North West	25°39′00″S 027°17′00″E	
FARI		Reivilo Airport			27°32′50″S 024°10′23″E	
FARM		Richmond Airport			31°25′25″S 023°58′42″E	
FARO		Rooiberg Airport			24°46′40″S 027°45′08″E	
FARS	ROD	Robertson Airport	Robertson	Western Cape	33°49′00″S 019°54′00″E	
FARZ		Reitz Airport			22°47′03″S 028°25′49″E	
FASB	SBU	Springbok Airport	Springbok	Northern Cape	29°41′22″S 017°56′20″E	
FASC	ZEC	Secunda Airport	Secunda	Mpumalanga	26°31′14″S 029°10′20″E	
FASD		Vredenburg Airport	Saldanha Bay	Western Cape	32°57′48″S 017°58′12″E	
FASE	GSS	Sabi Sabi Airport	Sabi Sabi	Mpumalanga	24°56′51″S 031°26′56″E	
FASG		Schweizer Reneke Airport			27°09′47″S 025°17′10″E	
FASH		Stellenbosch Flying Club	Stellenbosch	Western Cape	33°58′47″S 018°49′11″E	
FASI		Springs Airport			26°14′54″S 028°23′51″E	
FASJ		Saffier Airport			26°45′38″S 027°45′42″E	
FASK		Air Force Base Swartkop	Centurion	Gauteng	25°48′35″S 028°09′53″E	
FASL		Sutherland Airport			32°29′18″S 020°41′50″E	
FASM		Siteka Airport			29°19′30″S 030°08′57″E	
FASN		Senekal Airport			28°18′44″S 027°38′46″E	
FASS	SIS	Sishen Airport	Dingleton	Northern Cape	27°39′00″S 023°00′00″E	
FAST		Somerset East Airport			32°45′01″S 025°35′42″E	
FASU		Sace Airport			25°57′25″S 029°12′42″E	
FASW		Slurry Airport			25°48′56″S 025°53′11″E	
FASX		Hendrik Swellengrebel Airport			34°03′00″S 020°29′00″E	
FASY		Baragwanath-Sylerfontein Airport			26°34′00″S 027°57′01″E	
FASZ	SZK	Skukuza Airport	Skukuza	Mpumalanga	24°58′00″S 031°36′00″E	
FATA		Teddarfield Airpark	Johannesburg	Gauteng	26°21′07″S 027°58′05″E	
FATB		Thorny Bush Game Lodge Airport			24°24′58″S 031°09′51″E	
FATF		Tommy's Field Airport			28°15′36″S 022°59′35″E	
FATG		Thaba Tholo Airport			24°16′52″S 027°13′46″E	
FATH	THY	P.R. Mphephu Airport	Thohoyandou	Limpopo	23°04′37″S 030°23′00″E	
FATI		Thabazimbi Airport			24°34′34″S 027°25′11″E	
FATM		Stutterheim Airport			32°33′45″S 027°22′19″E	
FATN	TCU	Thaba 'Nchu Airport	Thaba 'Nchu	Free State	29°19′03″S 026°49′20″E	
FATP		New Tempe Airport	Bloemfontein	Free State	29°01′58″S 026°09′29″E	
FATR		Trennery's Airport			32°38′23″S 028°25′23″E	
FATT		Tutuka Power Station Airport			26°46′29″S 029°20′16″E	
FATW		Witberg Tswalu Airport			27°12′18″S 022°28′55″E	
FATZ	LTA	Tzaneen Airport	Tzaneen	Limpopo	23°49′48″S 030°19′00″E	
FAUB		Underberg Airport			29°47′18″S 029°29′54″E	
FAUC		Ulco Airport			28°21′16″S 024°13′45″E	
FAUG		Ugie Airport			31°13′16″S 028°12′33″E	
FAUH		Uitenhage Airport			33°47′07″S 025°23′00″E	
FAUL	ULD	Ulundi Airport	Ulundi	KwaZulu-Natal	28°19′10″S 031°25′01″E	
FAUP	UTN	Upington Airport	Upington	Northern Cape	28°24′04″S 021°15′36″E	
FAUR		Utrecht Airport			27°40′50″S 030°19′00″E	
FAUS		Ulusaba Airport			24°47′07″S 031°21′18″E	
FAUT	UTT	Mthatha Airport	Mthatha	Eastern Cape	31°32′52″S 028°40′27″E	
FAVA		Vaalputs Airport			30°08′03″S 018°31′36″E	
FAVB	VRU	Vryburg Airport	Vryburg	North West	26°58′00″S 024°44′00″E	
FAVE		Ventersdorp Airport			26°18′03″S 026°48′51″E	
FAVF		Verborgenfontei Airport			31°09′57″S 023°48′34″E	
FAVG	VIR	Virginia Airport	Durban	KwaZulu-Natal	29°46′14″S 031°03′30″E	
FAVI		Von Abo's Villa Airport			27°36′38″S 026°41′01″E	
FAVM		Venetia Mine Airport			22°26′53″S 029°20′15″E	
FAVP		Vanderbijlpark Airport			26°41′25″S 027°46′38″E	
FAVR	VRE	Vredendal Airport	Vredendal	Western Cape	31°38′35″S 018°32′22″E	
FAVS		Vastrap Airport			27°50′04″S 021°37′49″E	
FAVU		Volksrust Airport			27°22′37″S 029°51′36″E	
FAVV		Vereeniging Airport			26°34′12″S 027°57′36″E	
FAVW		Victoria West Airport	Victoria West	Northern Cape	31°24′00″S 023°09′00″E	
FAVY	VYD	Vryheid Airport	Vryheid	KwaZulu-Natal	27°47′00″S 030°48′00″E	
FAWA		Warmbaths Airport			24°54′31″S 028°18′35″E	
FAWB	PRY	Wonderboom Airport	Pretoria	Gauteng	25°39′13″S 028°13′27″E	
FAWC		Worcester Airport	Worcester	Western Cape	33°39′47″S 019°24′55″E	
FAWD		Wolmeransstad Airport			27°10′23″S 025°58′35″E	Closed
FAWE		Welgevonden Reserve Airport			24°12′13″S 027°54′02″E	
FAWI		Witbank Airport			25°49′56″S 029°11′31″E	
FAWK	WKF	Air Force Base Waterkloof	Tshwane	Gauteng	25°49′40″S 028°13′15″E	
FAWL		Williston Airport			31°23′01″S 020°55′58″E	
FAWM	WEL	Welkom Airport	Welkom	Free State	27°59′52″S 026°40′10″E	
FAWN		Cape Winelands Airport	Fisantekraal	Western Cape	33°46′17″S 018°44′24″E	
FAWO		Willowmore Airport			33°15′48″S 023°29′26″E	
FAWS		Wesselbronn Af Airport			27°50′48″S 026°21′02″E	
FAWT		Winterveldt Mine Airport			24°39′36″S 030°10′50″E	
FAWV		White River Mercy Airport			25°19′11″S 030°58′15″E	
FAYP		Air Force Base Ysterplaat	Cape Town	Western Cape	33°54′04″S 018°29′00″E	
FAZP		Mazeppa Bay Airport			32°28′20″S 028°39′02″E	
FAZQ		Star Airport			26°53′35″S 027°41′24″E	
FAZR		Zeerust Airport			25°35′56″S 026°02′32″E	

== FB – Botswana ==
Also see airport category and list.

ICAO	IATA	Airport name	Community	Coordinates	Notes
FBCO		Camp Okavango Airport	Camp Okavango	19°07′01″S 023°06′00″E	
FBGM		Gumare Airport	Gumare	19°22′01″S 022°10′01″E	
FBGZ	GNZ	Ghanzi Airport	Ghanzi	21°41′31″S 021°39′29″E	
FBJW	JWA	Jwaneng Airport	Jwaneng	24°36′07″S 024°41′28″E	
FBKE	BBK	Kasane Airport	Kasane	17°49′59″S 025°09′43″E	
FBKG		Kang Airport	Kang	23°40′59″S 022°49′01″E	
FBKR	KHW	Khwai River Airport	Khwai River	19°09′00″S 023°46′59″E	
FBKY		Kanye Airport	Kanye	25°03′00″S 025°19′01″E	
FBLO	LOQ	Lobatse Airport	Lobatse	25°11′22″S 025°40′56″E	Closed
FBMA		Matsieng Airport	Matsieng	24°21′25″S 026°05′24″E	
FBMG		Machaneng Airport	Machaneng	23°10′59″S 027°28′01″E	
FBML		Molepolole Airport	Molepolole	24°23′20″S 025°29′56″E	Closed
FBMM		Makalamabedi Airport	Makalamabedi	20°19′59″S 023°52′59″E	
FBMN	MUB	Maun Airport	Maun	19°58′23″S 023°25′52″E	
FBNN		Nokaneng Airport	Nokaneng	19°20′20″S 022°09′14″E	
FBNT		Nata Airport	Nata	20°12′58″S 026°09′32″E	
FBNW		Moremi Crossing Airport	Moremi	19°31′44″S 023°08′22″E	
FBOK		Okwa Camp One Airport		23°04′59″S 021°52′59″E	
FBOR	ORP	Orapa Airport	Orapa	21°16′01″S 025°19′01″E	
FBPA		Pandamatenga Airport	Pandamatenga	18°31′53″S 025°39′07″E	
FBPM	FRW	Phillip Gaonwe Matante International Airport	Francistown	21°09′36″S 027°28′30″E	Replaces FBFT
FBPY	QPH	Palapye Airport	Palapye	22°34′01″S 027°09′00″E	
FBRK		Rakops Airport	Rakops	21°00′00″S 024°19′59″E	
FBSD		Serondela Airport	Serondela	17°50′19″S 025°01′54″E	
FBSK	GBE	Sir Seretse Khama International Airport	Gaborone	24°33′18″S 025°55′05″E	
FBSN	SXN	Sua Pan Airport	Sua Pan	20°33′11″S 026°06′58″E	
FBSP	PKW	Selebi-Phikwe Airport	Selebi-Phikwe	22°03′26″S 027°49′37″E	
FBSR		Serowe Airport	Serowe	22°25′23″S 026°45′25″E	Closed
FBSV	SVT	Savuti Airport	Savuti	18°31′16″S 024°04′37″E	
FBSW	SWX	Shakawe Airport	Shakawe	18°22′26″S 021°49′59″E	
FBTE		Tshane Airport	Tshane	24°01′01″S 021°52′59″E	
FBTL	TLD	Tuli Lodge Airport	Tuli Lodge	22°10′59″S 029°07′01″E	
FBTP		Thebephatshwa Airport	Thebephatshwa	24°13′16″S 025°20′49″E	
FBTS	TBY	Tshabong Airport	Tshabong	26°01′59″S 022°24′00″E	
FBXB		Xaxaba Airport	Xaxaba	19°33′04″S 023°03′18″E	
FBXG		Xugana Airport	Xugana	19°03′00″S 023°05′24″E	
FBXX		Xudum Airport	Xudum	19°41′01″S 022°52′19″E	

== FC – Republic of the Congo ==
Also see airport category and list.

ICAO	IATA	Airport name	Community	Coordinates	Notes
FCBA		La Louila Airport	La Louila	04°04′59″S 014°13′59″E	Closed
FCBB	BZV	Maya-Maya Airport	Brazzaville	04°15′06″S 015°15′11″E	
FCBD	DJM	Djambala Airport	Djambala	02°31′10″S 014°45′10″E	
FCBK	KNJ	Kindamba Airport	Kindamba	03°44′55″S 014°29′30″E	Closed
FCBL	LCO	Lague Airport	Lague	02°27′00″S 014°32′00″E	Closed
FCBM	MUY	Mouyondzi Airport	Mouyondzi	04°00′53″S 013°57′59″E	Closed
FCBP		M'passa Airport	M'passa	04°22′01″S 014°09′00″E	Closed
FCBS	SIB	Sibiti Airport	Sibiti	03°41′12″S 013°22′20″E	
FCBT		Loutete Airport	Loutete	04°16′59″S 013°52′01″E	Closed
FCBU		Aubeville Airport	Aubeville	04°16′01″S 013°31′59″E	Closed
FCBY	NKY	Yokangassi Airport	Nkayi	04°13′20″S 013°17′15″E	
FCBZ	ANJ	Zanaga Airport	Zanaga	02°50′50″S 013°49′15″E	
FCMA		Mavinza Airport		02°27′00″S 011°39′00″E	Closed
FCMB		N'Ziba Airport		02°43′01″S 012°31′59″E	Closed
FCMD		Sidetra Airport		02°52′01″S 012°52′01″E	Closed
FCMG		Gokango Airport		03°01′59″S 012°07′59″E	Closed
FCMI		Irogo Airport		02°43′01″S 011°52′59″E	Closed
FCML		Leboulou Airport		02°54′00″S 012°22′01″E	Closed
FCMM	MSX	Mossendjo Airport	Mossendjo	02°56′47″S 012°41′55″E	
FCMN		N'gongo Airport		02°58′59″S 012°12′00″E	Closed
FCMO		Mandoro Airport		02°39′00″S 012°52′59″E	Closed
FCMR		Marala Airport		02°54′00″S 012°37′59″E	Closed
FCMY		Legala Airport		02°12′39″S 012°49′35″E	
FCMZ		N'Zabi Airport		03°10′01″S 012°52′01″E	Closed
FCOB	BOE	Boundji Airport	Boundji	01°01′52″S 015°20′05″E	
FCOD	OLL	Oyo Ollombo Airport	Oyo	01°13′36″S 015°54′36″E	
FCOE	EWO	Ewo Airport	Ewo	00°51′20″S 014°48′10″E	
FCOG	GMM	Gamboma Airport	Gamboma	01°49′50″S 015°53′00″E	
FCOI	ION	Impfondo Airport	Impfondo	01°35′22″N 018°02′42″E	
FCOK	KEE	Kelle Airport	Kelle	00°04′20″S 014°30′25″E	
FCOM	MKJ	Makoua Airport	Makoua	00°01′15″S 015°34′35″E	
FCOO	FTX	Owando Airport	Owando	00°31′20″S 015°56′10″E	
FCOS	SOE	Souanké Airport	Souanké	01°59′50″N 014°10′30″E	
FCOT	BTB	Betou Airport	Betou	03°03′28″N 018°30′55″E	
FCOU	OUE	Ouesso Airport	Ouesso	01°36′55″N 016°02′15″E	
FCPA	KMK	Makabana Airport	Makabana	03°28′50″S 012°35′55″E	
FCPB		Bangamba Airport		03°40′59″S 013°12′00″E	Closed
FCPE		Leganda Airport		03°25′59″S 012°55′59″E	Closed
FCPG		Kibangou Airport		03°28′59″S 012°18′00″E	Closed
FCPI		Loubetsi Airport		03°42′00″S 012°07′59″E	Closed
FCPK		N'komo Airport		03°56′24″S 011°18′32″E	
FCPL	DIS	Dolisie Airport	Dolisie	04°12′22″S 012°39′35″E	
FCPN		Noumbi Airport	Noumbi	04°08′39″S 011°23′01″E	
FCPO		Pemo Airport		02°52′01″S 012°31′59″E	Closed
FCPP	PNR	Agostinho-Neto International Airport	Pointe-Noire	04°48′48″S 011°53′09″E	
FCPY		Loukanyi Airport		04°02′42″S 011°31′17″E	

== FD – Eswatini ==
Also see airport category and list.

ICAO	IATA	Airport name	Community	Coordinates	Notes
FDBM		Matata Airport		26°52′01″S 031°55′59″E	Closed
FDBS		Sugar Estate Airport		26°50′10″S 031°55′12″E	
FDBT		Tambuti Airport		26°44′07″S 031°46′33″E	
FDKB; FDKS		Kubuta Airfield	Kubuta	26°52′54″S 031°29′20″E	
FDLV		Lavumisa Airfield	Lavumisa	27°19′01″S 031°52′59″E	Closed
FDMH		Mhlume Airfield	Mhlume	26°01′30″S 031°48′35″E	
FDMS	MTS	Matsapha Airport	Manzini	26°31′44″S 031°18′27″E	
FDNG		Piggs Peak Airfield	Ngonini	25°47′55″S 031°24′45″E	
FDNH		Nhlangano Airfield	Nhlangano	27°07′10″S 031°12′45″E	
FDNS		Nsoko Airfield	Nsoko	26°59′10″S 031°56′15″E	
FDSK	SHO	King Mswati III Int'l Airport	Manzini	26°21′24″S 031°43′01″E	
FDSM		Simunye Airfield	Simunye	26°11′45″S 031°55′50″E	
FDST		Siteki Airfield	Siteki	26°28′20″S 031°56′34″E	
FDTM		Tambankulu Airfield	Tambankulu	26°06′25″S 031°55′10″E	
FDTS		Tshaneni Airfield	Tshaneni	25°59′10″S 031°45′05″E	
FDUB		Ubombo Ranches Airfield	Big Bend	26°46′10″S 031°56′14″E	

== FE – Central African Republic ==
Also see airport category and list.

ICAO	IATA	Airport name	Community	Coordinates	Notes
FEFA		Alindao Airport		05°01′20″N 021°11′54″E	
FEFB		Poste Airport	Obo	05°24′15″N 026°29′14″E	
FEFC	CRF	Carnot Airport	Carnot	04°56′17″N 015°53′38″E	
FEFD		Damara Airport		04°57′00″N 018°42′00″E	Closed
FEFE		Mobaye Mbanga Airport	Mobaye	04°22′30″N 021°08′00″E	
FEFF	BGF	Bangui M'Poko International Airport	Bangui	04°23′58″N 018°31′10″E	
FEFG	BGU	Bangassou Airport	Bangassou	04°47′09″N 022°46′58″E	
FEFI	IRO	Birao Airport	Birao	10°14′13″N 022°42′59″E	
FEFK		Kembé Airport		04°36′50″N 021°51′44″E	
FEFL	BEM	Bossembele Airport	Bossembélé	05°16′00″N 017°38′00″E	Closed
FEFM	BBY	Bambari Airport	Bambari	05°50′50″N 020°38′58″E	
FEFN	NDL	N'Délé Airport	N'Délé	08°25′37″N 020°38′07″E	
FEFO	BOP	Bouar Airport	Bouar	05°57′32″N 015°38′16″E	
FEFP		Paoua Airport	Paoua	07°15′06″N 016°26′27″E	
FEFQ		Kaga Bandoro Airport		06°59′16″N 019°10′38″E	
FEFR	BIV	Bria Airport	Bria	06°31′44″N 021°59′19″E	
FEFS	BSN	Bossangoa Airport	Bossangoa	06°29′31″N 017°25′46″E	
FEFT	BBT	Berberati Airport	Berbérati	04°13′10″N 015°47′12″E	
FEFU		Sibut Airport	Sibut	05°43′28″N 019°06′23″E	
FEFW	ODA	Ouadda Airport	Ouadda	08°00′39″N 022°23′53″E	
FEFY	AIG	Yalinga Airport	Yalinga	06°31′15″N 023°15′34″E	
FEFZ	IMO	Zemio Airport	Zemio	05°00′08″N 025°06′08″E	
FEGB		Bambouti Airport		05°25′20″N 027°12′34″E	
FEGC		Bocaranga Airport	Bocaranga	06°55′28″N 015°37′27″E	
FEGD		Dekoa Airport		06°18′00″N 019°04′59″E	Closed
FEGE	MKI	M'Boki Airport	Obo	05°19′59″N 025°55′54″E	
FEGF	BTG	Batangafo Airport	Batangafo	07°18′52″N 018°18′32″E	
FEGG		Gamboula Airport		04°08′17″N 015°09′15″E	
FEGI		Grimari Airport		05°40′59″N 020°03′00″E	Closed
FEGK		Kouango Airport		04°59′27″N 019°59′02″E	
FEGL	GDI	Gordil Airport	Gordil	09°34′56″N 021°43′35″E	
FEGM	BMF	Bakouma Airport	Bakouma	05°41′38″N 022°48′01″E	
FEGO	ODJ	Ouanda Djallé Airport	Ouanda Djallé	08°54′25″N 022°47′52″E	
FEGR	RFA	Rafai Airport	Rafaï	04°59′19″N 023°55′41″E	
FEGU	BCF	Bouca Airport	Bouca	06°31′01″N 018°16′21″E	
FEGZ	BOZ	Bozoum Airport	Bozoum	06°20′39″N 016°19′19″E	

== FG – Equatorial Guinea ==
Also see airport category and list.

ICAO	IATA	Airport name	Community	Coordinates
FGAB	NBN	Annobón Airport	San Antonio de Palé	01°24′37″S 005°37′19″E
FGBT	BSG	Bata Airport	Bata	01°54′20″N 009°48′20″E
FGCO	OCS	Corisco International Airport	Corisco	00°54′55″N 009°19′50″E
FGMM		Mongomo Airport		01°38′12″N 011°18′09″E
FGMY	GEM	President Obiang Nguema International Airport	Mengomeyén	01°41′24″N 011°01′26″E
FGSL	SSG	Malabo International Airport	Malabo	03°45′19″N 008°42′31″E

== FH – Saint Helena, Ascension and Tristan da Cunha ==
Also see airport category and list.

ICAO	IATA	Airport name	Community	Coordinates
FHAW	ASI	RAF Ascension Island ("Wideawake") (Ascension Aux. AF)	Georgetown	07°58′10″S 014°23′38″W
FHSH	HLE	Saint Helena Airport	Saint Helena	15°57′33″S 005°38′45″W

== FI – Mauritius ==
Also see airport category and list.

ICAO	IATA	Airport name	Community	Coordinates
FIMA		Agalega Airstrip	Agalega Islands	10°22′27″S 056°36′29″E
FIML		Mon Loisir Airport		20°07′26″S 057°40′54″E
FIMP	MRU	Sir Seewoosagur Ramgoolam International Airport	Plaine Magnien	20°25′48″S 057°40′59″E
FIMR	RRG	Sir Gaëtan Duval Airport (Plaine Corail Airport)	Rodrigues Island	19°45′27″S 063°21′39″E

== FJ – British Indian Ocean Territory ==
Also see airport category and list.

- FJDG – Naval Support Facility Diego Garcia – Diego Garcia – 07°18′48″S 072°24′40″E

== FK – Cameroon ==
Also see airport category and list.

ICAO	IATA	Airport name	Community	Coordinates	Notes
FKAB		Banyo Airport		06°46′30″N 011°48′27″E	
FKAF		Bafia Airport		06°46′30″N 011°48′27″E	Closed
FKAG		Abong M'bang Airport		03°58′01″N 013°12′00″E	Closed
FKAN		Nkongsamba Airport		04°57′00″N 009°55′59″E	Closed
FKAO		Betare Oya Airport		05°30′15″N 014°05′54″E	
FKKB	KBI	Kribi Airport	Kribi	02°52′26″N 009°58′40″E	
FKKC	TKC	Tiko Airport	Tiko	04°05′21″N 009°21′37″E	
FKKD	DLA	Douala International Airport	Douala	04°00′21″N 009°43′10″E	
FKKE		Eséka Airport	Eséka	03°38′30″N 010°47′28″E	
FKKF	MMF	Mamfe Airport	Mamfe	05°42′16″N 009°18′21″E	
FKKG	BLC	Bali Airport	Bali	05°53′43″N 010°02′02″E	
FKKH	KLE	Kaélé Airport	Kaélé	10°05′33″N 014°26′44″E	
FKKI	OUR	Batouri Airport	Batouri	04°28′30″N 014°21′45″E	
FKKJ	GXX	Yagoua Airport	Yagoua	10°21′22″N 015°14′14″E	
FKKL	MVR	Salak Airport	Maroua	10°27′05″N 014°15′26″E	
FKKM	FOM	Nkounja Airport	Foumban	05°38′13″N 010°45′03″E	
FKKN	NGE	N'Gaoundéré Airport	N'Gaoundéré	07°21′25″N 013°33′33″E	
FKKO	BTA	Bertoua Airport	Bertoua	04°32′55″N 013°43′34″E	
FKKR	GOU	Garoua International Airport	Garoua	09°20′09″N 013°22′12″E	
FKKS	DSC	Dschang Airport	Dschang	05°26′51″N 010°04′05″E	
FKKT		Tibati Airport		06°28′59″N 012°37′59″E	Closed
FKKU	BFX	Bafoussam Airport	Bafoussam	05°32′12″N 010°21′16″E	
FKKV	BPC	Bamenda Airport	Bamenda	06°02′21″N 010°07′21″E	
FKKW	EBW	Ebolowa Airport	Ebolowa	02°52′39″N 011°11′03″E	
FKKY	YAO	Yaoundé Airport	Yaoundé	03°50′10″N 011°31′24″E	
FKYS	NSI	Yaoundé Nsimalen International Airport	Yaoundé	03°43′21″N 011°33′12″E	

== FL – Zambia ==
Also see airport category and list.

ICAO	IATA	Airport name	Community	Coordinates	Notes
FLAT		Katete Airport		14°07′06″S 032°03′38″E	
FLBA	MMQ	Mbala Airport	Mbala	08°51′30″S 031°20′00″E	
FLBP		Baobab Plains Airport		17°53′33″S 025°52′19″E	
FLCC		Chocha Airport		08°25′55″S 029°48′18″E	
FLCH		Choma Airport		16°46′59″S 027°00′00″E	Closed
FLCP	CIP	Chipata Airport	Chipata	13°33′25″S 032°35′13″E	
FLCS		Chinsali Airport		10°34′57″S 032°04′47″E	
FLEA		East One Airport		11°38′19″S 029°44′12″E	
FLEB		East Two Airport		11°06′30″S 030°21′35″E	
FLEC		East Three Airport		14°07′00″S 030°07′45″E	
FLED		East Four Airport		14°49′59″S 030°04′59″E	Closed
FLEE		East Five Airport		10°32′21″S 033°24′22″E	Closed
FLEF		East Six Airport		11°08′09″S 030°00′55″E	
FLEG		East Seven Airport		12°25′02″S 029°29′00″E	
FLEH		East Eight Airport		12°09′01″S 029°26′15″E	
FLHN	LVI	Harry Mwanga Nkumbula International Airport	Livingstone	17°49′18″S 025°49′20″E	Formerly FLLI
FLIK		Isoka Airport		10°09′43″S 032°39′35″E	
FLJK		Jeki Airport		15°38′00″S 029°36′14″E	
FLKB		Kawambwa Airport		09°47′53″S 029°05′30″E	
FLKE	ZKP	Kasompe Airport	Chingola	12°34′22″S 027°53′38″E	
FLKG		Kalengwa Airport		13°28′27″S 025°00′51″E	
FLKJ		Kanja Airport		16°27′00″S 023°22′01″E	Closed
FLKK	LUN	Kenneth Kaunda International Airport	Lusaka	15°19′54″S 028°26′03″E	Formerly FLLS
FLKL	KLB	Kalabo Airport	Kalabo	14°59′55″S 022°38′50″E	
FLKO	KMZ	Kaoma Airport	Kaoma	14°47′50″S 024°48′30″E	
FLKS	KAA	Kasama Airport	Kasama	10°13′00″S 031°08′00″E	
FLKU		Kanyau Airport		16°30′00″S 022°25′01″E	Closed
FLKW	QKE	Milliken Airport	Kabwe	14°27′00″S 028°22′45″E	
FLKY		Kasaba Bay Airport		08°31′20″S 030°39′55″E	
FLKZ		Lukuzi Airport		12°50′52″S 032°02′09″E	
FLLA		Luanshya Airport		13°08′30″S 028°25′30″E	
FLLC		Lusaka City Airport	Lusaka	15°24′50″S 028°19′50″E	
FLLD		Lundazi Airport		12°17′10″S 033°11′10″E	Closed
FLLG		Luwingu Airport		10°14′43″S 029°54′50″E	Closed
FLLK	LXU	Lukulu Airport	Lukulu	14°22′30″S 023°15′00″E	
FLLO		Kalomo Airport		16°59′09″S 026°28′51″E	
FLLY		Lilayi Airport		15°32′18″S 028°18′07″E	Closed
FLMA	MNS	Mansa Airport	Mansa	11°08′17″S 028°52′30″E	
FLMB		Maamba Airport		17°22′03″S 027°11′07″E	
FLMF	MFU	Mfuwe Airport	Mfuwe	13°15′32″S 031°56′10″E	
FLMG	MNR	Mongu Airport	Mongu	15°15′18″S 023°09′45″E	
FLMK		Mkushi Airport		13°37′18″S 029°23′06″E	
FLML		Mufulira Airport		12°33′55″S 028°17′39″E	
FLMM		Batoka Sky Airport		17°53′04″S 025°50′48″E	
FLMO		Monze Airport		16°17′17″S 027°30′19″E	
FLMP		Mpika Airport		11°53′58″S 031°26′05″E	
FLMU		Mulobezi Airport		16°46′36″S 025°11′09″E	
FLMW		Mwinilunga Airport		11°39′12″S 024°25′45″E	
FLMZ		Mazabuka		15°51′41″S 027°49′42″E	
FLNA		Ngoma Airport		15°57′57″S 025°56′00″E	
FLND		Peter Zuze Air Force Base		12°59′50″S 028°39′50″E	
FLNL		Namwala		15°46′01″S 026°25′54″E	
FLNY		Nyimba Airport		14°34′07″S 030°50′03″E	Closed
FLPA		Kasempa Airport		13°26′24″S 025°47′10″E	Closed
FLPE		Petauke Airport		14°13′00″S 031°13′32″E	
FLPK		Mporokoso Airport		09°22′11″S 030°07′41″E	Closed
FLPO		Kabompo Airport		13°34′34″S 024°13′48″E	
FLRO		Rosa Airport		09°31′37″S 031°14′15″E	
FLRU		Rufansa Airport		15°04′59″S 029°37′59″E	Closed
FLRZ		Royal Zambezi Lodge Airport		15°43′29″S 029°18′13″E	
FLSE		Serenje Airport		13°11′53″S 030°14′23″E	
FLSH		Shiwa n'gandu Airport		11°12′03″S 031°45′02″E	
FLSJ		Sakeji Airport		11°14′10″S 024°18′55″E	
FLSK	NLA	Simon Mwansa Kapwepwe International Airport	Ndola	12°57′42″S 028°31′00″E	Formerly FLND
FLSN	SXG	Senanga Airport	Senanga	16°06′45″S 023°18′00″E	
FLSO	KIW	Southdowns Airport	Kitwe	12°54′01″S 028°08′59″E	
FLSS	SJQ	Sesheke Airport	Sesheke	17°28′36″S 024°18′20″E	
FLSW	SLI	Solwezi Airport	Solwezi	12°10′27″S 026°22′00″E	
FLWA		West One Airport		12°51′27″S 027°04′16″E	
FLWB		West Two Airport		13°45′45″S 027°31′20″E	Closed
FLWC		West Three Airport		13°21′13″S 026°36′00″E	
FLWD		West Four Airport		13°38′43″S 025°25′19″E	
FLWE		West Five Airport		13°57′51″S 024°27′38″E	
FLWF		West Six Airport		12°13′06″S 027°29′20″E	
FLWG		West Seven Airport		11°54′46″S 025°41′04″E	
FLWW		Waka Waka Airport		12°25′26″S 032°16′06″E	
FLYA		Samfya Airport		11°21′55″S 029°32′53″E	Closed
FLZB	BBZ	Zambezi Airport	Zambezi	13°32′10″S 023°06′20″E	

== FM – Comoros, Mayotte, Réunion, and Madagascar ==
=== Comoros ===
Also see airport category and list.

ICAO	IATA	Airport name	Community	Coordinates
FMCH	HAH	Prince Said Ibrahim International Airport	Moroni	11°32′12″S 043°16′17″E
FMCI	NWA	Mohéli Bandar Es Eslam Airport	Mohéli	12°17′53″S 043°45′59″E
FMCN	YVA	Iconi Airport	Moroni	11°42′45″S 043°14′35″E
FMCV	AJN	Ouani Airport	Anjouan	12°07′52″S 044°25′50″E

=== Mayotte ===
Also see airport category and list.

- FMCZ (DZA) – Dzaoudzi Pamandzi International Airport – Dzaoudzi, Mayotte – 12°48′33″S 045°16′55″E

=== Réunion ===
Also see airport category and list.

ICAO	IATA	Airport name	Community	Coordinates
FMEE	RUN	Roland Garros Airport	Saint-Denis	20°53′25″S 055°31′02″E
FMEP	ZSE	Pierrefonds Airport	Saint-Pierre	21°19′09″S 055°25′21″E

=== Madagascar ===
Also see airport category and list.

ICAO	IATA	Airport name	Community	Coordinates	Notes
FMMA		Arivonimamo Air Base	Antananarivo	19°01′45″S 047°10′19″E	
FMMB		Ambatomainty Airport	Ambatomainty	17°41′12″S 045°37′26″E	
FMMC	WML	Malaimbandy Airport	Malaimbandy	20°21′21″S 045°32′33″E	
FMME	ATJ	Antsirabe Airport	Antsirabe	19°50′20″S 047°03′50″E	
FMMG	WAQ	Antsalova Airport	Antsalova	18°42′04″S 044°36′53″E	
FMMH		Mahanoro Airport	Mahanoro	19°49′59″S 048°48′00″E	
FMMI	TNR	Ivato International Airport	Antanànarìvo	18°47′49″S 047°28′44″E	
FMMJ		Ambohijanahary Airport	Ambohijanahary	17°27′54″S 048°19′32″E	
FMMK	JVA	Ankavandra Airport	Ankavandra	18°48′22″S 045°16′27″E	
FMML	BMD	Belo sur Tsiribihina Airport	Belo sur Tsiribihina	19°41′12″S 044°32′31″E	
FMMN	ZVA	Miandrivazo Airport	Miandrivazo	19°33′46″S 045°27′03″E	
FMMO	MXT	Maintirano Airport	Maintirano	18°02′59″S 044°01′58″E	
FMMP		Amparafaravola Airport	Amparafaravola	17°39′16″S 048°12′51″E	
FMMQ	ILK	Ilaka-Est Airport	Ilaka-Est	19°34′59″S 048°48′11″E	
FMMR	TVA	Morafenobe Airport	Morafenobe	17°50′59″S 044°55′14″E	
FMMS	SMS	Sainte Marie Airport	Île Sainte-Marie	17°05′38″S 049°48′57″E	
FMMT	TMM	Toamasina Airport	Toamasina	18°06′34″S 049°23′33″E	
FMMU	WTA	Tambohorano Airport	Tambohorano	17°28′34″S 043°58′22″E	
FMMV	MOQ	Morondava Airport	Morondava	20°17′05″S 044°19′03″E	
FMMX	WTS	Tsiroanomandidy Airport	Tsiroanomandidy	18°45′34″S 046°03′15″E	
FMMY	VAT	Vatomandry Airport	Vatomandry	19°22′30″S 048°56′20″E	
FMMZ	WAM	Ambatondrazaka Airport	Ambatondrazaka	17°47′43″S 048°26′33″E	
FMNA	DIE	Arrachart Airport	Antsiranana	12°20′57″S 049°17′30″E	
FMNB		Ankaizina Airport	Ankaizina	14°32′24″S 048°41′23″E	
FMNC	WMR	Mananara Nord Airport	Mananara Nord	16°09′50″S 049°46′25″E	
FMND	ZWA	Andapa Airport	Andapa	14°39′06″S 049°37′14″E	
FMNE		Ambilobe Airport	Ambilobe	13°11′12″S 048°59′15″E	
FMNF	WBD	Befandriana Nord Airport	Befandriana Nord	15°12′27″S 048°28′57″E	
FMNG	WPB	Port Bergé Airport	Boriziny	15°35′03″S 047°37′25″E	
FMNH	ANM	Antsirabato Airport	Antalaha	14°59′57″S 050°19′12″E	
FMNJ	IVA	Ambanja Airport	Ambanja	13°29′06″S 048°37′58″E	
FMNK		Andrakaka Navy Field	Andrakaka	12°15′10″S 049°15′13″E	
FMNL	HVA	Analalava Airport	Analalava	14°37′47″S 047°45′50″E	
FMNM	MJN	Amborovy Airport	Mahajanga	15°40′01″S 046°21′06″E	
FMNN	NOS	Nosy Be Airport	Nosy Be	13°18′43″S 048°18′53″E	
FMNO	DWB	Soalala Airport	Soalala	16°06′06″S 045°21′31″E	
FMNP	WMP	Mampikony Airport	Mampikony	16°04′18″S 047°38′34″E	
FMNQ	BPY	Besalampy Airport	Besalampy	16°44′30″S 044°28′53″E	
FMNR	WMN	Maroantsetra Airport	Maroantsetra	15°26′12″S 049°41′18″E	
FMNS	SVB	Sambava Sud Airport	Sambava Sud	14°16′41″S 050°10′36″E	
FMNT	TTS	Tsaratanana Airport	Tsaratanana	16°45′03″S 047°37′08″E	
FMNV	VOH	Vohemar Airport	Vohemar	13°22′33″S 050°00′10″E	
FMNW	WAI	Ambalabe Airport	Antsohihy	14°53′49″S 047°59′38″E	
FMNX		Mandritsara Airport	Mandritsara	15°50′46″S 048°50′05″E	
FMNZ		Ampampamena Airport	Ampampamena	13°29′06″S 048°37′58″E	
FMSA		Ambalavao Airport	Ambalavao	21°48′55″S 046°54′48″E	
FMSB	WBO	Antsoa Airport	Beroroha	21°36′13″S 045°08′08″E	
FMSC	WMD	Mandabe Airport	Mandabe	21°02′47″S 044°56′25″E	
FMSD	FTU	Tôlanaro Airport	Tôlanaro	25°02′23″S 046°57′14″E	
FMSE		Betroka Airport	Betroka	23°16′28″S 046°07′30″E	
FMSF	WFI	Fianarantsoa Airport	Fianarantsoa	21°26′29″S 047°06′42″E	
FMSG	RVA	Farafangana Airport	Farafangana	22°48′19″S 047°49′15″E	
FMSI	IHO	Ihosy Airport	Ihosy	22°24′23″S 046°10′00″E	
FMSJ	MJA	Manja Airport	Manja	21°25′00″S 044°19′00″E	
FMSK	WVK	Manakara Airport	Manakara	22°07′11″S 048°01′18″E	
FMSL	OVA	Bekily Airport	Bekily	24°14′11″S 045°18′16″E	
FMSM	MNJ	Mananjary Airport	Mananjary	21°12′06″S 048°21′29″E	
FMSN	TDV	Tanandava-Samangoky Airport	Tanandava-Samangoky	21°42′00″S 043°43′59″E	Closed
FMSR	MXM	Morombe Airport	Morombe	21°45′14″S 043°22′31″E	
FMST	TLE	Toliara Airport	Toliara	23°23′00″S 043°43′42″E	
FMSU		Vangaindrano Airport	Vangaindrano	23°21′03″S 047°34′54″E	
FMSV	BKU	Betioky Airport	Betioky	23°43′59″S 044°23′20″E	
FMSY	AMP	Ampanihy Airport	Ampanihy	24°41′59″S 044°44′03″E	
FMSZ	WAK	Ankazoabo Airport	Ankazoabo	22°17′47″S 044°31′54″E	
