= List of airports in Eswatini =

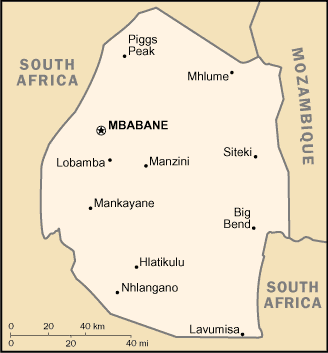
Map of Eswatini

This is a list of airports in Eswatini, sorted by location.

Eswatini is a landlocked country in southern Africa, bordered to the north, south and west by South Africa, and to the east by Mozambique. The nation, as well as its people, are named after the 19th-century king Mswati II. Eswatini is divided into four districts: Hhohho, Lubombo, Manzini, and Shiselweni. The capital of Eswatini is Mbabane, while the country's traditional and legislative capital is Lobamba.

== Airports ==
Names shown in bold indicate the airport has scheduled passenger service on commercial airlines.

Most of the airfields listed below are unpaved. The exceptions are Matsapha Airport and King Mswati III International Airport, previously called Sikhuphe International Airport.

Location served	ICAO	IATA	Airport name	Runway length/surface	Coordinates
Big Bend	FDBT		Tambuti Airfield	800 m (2,600 ft) Grass	26°44′10″S 31°46′35″E
Big Bend	FDUB		Ubombo Ranches Airfield	730 m (2,400 ft) unpaved	26°46′07″S 031°56′12″E
Bhunya			Bhunya Airfield	1,250 m (4,100 ft) Gravel	26°35′0″S 30°56′35″E
Kubuta	FDKS / FDKB		Kubuta Airfield	847 m (2,779 ft) grass	26°52′54″S 031°29′23″E
Manzini	FDMS	MTS	Matsapha (International) Airport	2,600 m (8,500 ft) paved	26°31′44″S 031°18′27″E
Manzini	FDSK	SHO	**King Mswati III International Airport**	3,600 m (11,800 ft) Asphalt	26°21′24″S 31°43′01″E
Mhlume	FDMH		Mhlume Airfield	709 m (2,326 ft) unpaved	26°01′33″S 031°48′36″E
Ngonini	FDNG		Piggs Peak Airfield	823 m (2,700 ft) unpaved	25°47′53″S 031°24′43″E
Nhlangano	FDNH		Nhlangano Airfield	671 m (2,201 ft) unpaved	27°07′12″S 031°12′45″E
Nsoko	FDNS		Nsoko Airfield	671 m (2,201 ft) unpaved	27°01′06″S 031°56′07″E
Simunye	FDSM		Simunye Airfield	1,100 m (3,600 ft) unpaved	26°11′46″S 031°55′48″E
Siteki	FDST		Siteki Airfield	1,006 m (3,301 ft) unpaved	26°28′19″S 031°56′35″E
Tambankulu	FDTM		Tambankulu Airfield	875 m (2,871 ft) unpaved	26°06′22″S 031°55′11″E
Tshaneni	FDTS		Tshaneni Airfield	756 m (2,480 ft) unpaved	25°59′06″S 031°45′07″E

The airstrip at Tshaneni is not to be confused with "Tshaneni Airport", a planned transportation hub based around the airstrip in Mkuze, a nearby town on the other side of the South African border.

== See also ==
- King Mswati III International Airport (SHO)
- Transport in Eswatini
- List of airports by ICAO code: F#FD - Eswatini
- Wikipedia: WikiProject Aviation/Airline destination lists: Africa#Eswatini
