= Telephone numbers in Eswatini =

- Country: Eswatini
- Continent: Africa
- Country code: +268
- International access: 00
- Long-distance: n/a

Eswatini, then known as Swaziland, was allocated the country code +268 by the International Telecommunication Union, in the late 1960s. To call a telephone number in Eswatini, the following format is used:

yy xx xxxx
calls from within Eswatini
+268 yy xx xxxx
calls from outside Eswatini

== List of allocations ==
List of allocations
NDC (National Destination Code) or leading digits of NSN (National Significant Number)	NSN number length	Usage of E.164 number			
22	8	Geographic number	Fixed line	EPTC	Shiselweni region
23	8	Geographic number	Fixed line	EPTC	Lubombo region
24	8	Geographic number	Fixed line	EPTC	Hhohho region
25	8	Geographic number	Fixed line	EPTC	Manzini region
76	8	Non-geographic	GSM	MTN Eswatini	-
77	8	Non-geographic	CDMA	EPTC	-
78	8	Non-geographic	Mobile GSM	MTN Eswatini	-
79	8	Non-geographic	Mobile GSM	Eswatini Mobile	-

== Changes as of March 2010 ==
Subscriber numbers were extended by a digit with '2' prepended to fixed numbers and '7' to mobile/GSM numbers.

Expanded mobile numbers (+268 6xxxxxx) took effect 1 March 2010. Old dialling format was allowed until the mandatory date of 1 June 2010.

Fixed numbers were expanded on 1 February 2011, postponed from the previously scheduled 1 August 2010, with mandatory use on 1 May 2011 (previously scheduled 1 November 2010).

List of changes
Old format	New format	Service/region	Effective	Mandatory
+268 2xxxxxx	+268 22xxxxxx	Shiselweni	1 Feb 2011	1 May 2011
+268 3xxxxxx	+268 23xxxxxx	Lubombo	1 Feb 2011	1 May 2011
+268 4xxxxxx	+268 24xxxxxx	Hhohho	1 Feb 2011	1 May 2011
+268 5xxxxxx	+268 25xxxxxx	Manzini	1 Feb 2011	1 May 2011
+268 6xxxxxx	+268 76xxxxxx	mobile (GSM)	1 Mar 2010	1 Jun 2010

== List of prefixes in Eswatini ==
LIST OF PREFIXES
Area/City	Prefix
Bhunya	2452 2453
Big Bend	2363 2364
Hlathikulu	2217
Hluthi	2227
Lobamba	2416
Ludzeludze	2548
Mahamba	2237
Mahwalala	2472
Malkerns	2528
Mankayane	2538
Manzini	2505 2506
Maphiveni	2373
Matsapha	2517 2518
Mbabane	2404 2405 2406
Mhlambanyatsi	2467
Mhlume	2312 2313
Mpaka	2333
Ngwenya	2442
Nhlangano	2207
Nsoko	2303
Pigg's Peak	2437
Sidwashini	2422
Simunye	2382 2383
Siphocosini	2482
Siphofaneni	2344
Siteki	2343
Tshaneni	2322 2323

== Calls to and from neighbouring countries ==
Until the 1990s, Swaziland was integrated into the South African telephone numbering plan; calls from South Africa to Swaziland were made using the code 0194. Calls to South Africa from Swaziland, however, required the use of the regional code 07. Calls to Lesotho were similarly made using the regional code 05 while those to Mozambique were made using the code 06.
