= List of cities in Eswatini =

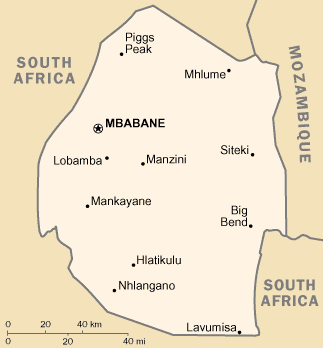
Kingdom of Eswatini

This is a list of cities and towns in Eswatini. The table below also includes the population and region information.

== List ==
Rank	City	1986	1997	2005 est.	Region
1.	Manzini	18,844	25,571	110,537	Manzini
2.	Mbabane	38,290	57,992	76,218	Hhohho
3.	Big Bend	9,676	9,374	10,342	Lubombo
4.	Malkerns	4,830	7,400	9,724	Manzini
5.	Nhlangano	4,107	6,540	9,016	Shiselweni
6.	Mhlume	6,509	7,661	8,652	Lubombo
7.	Hluti		5,806	6,763	Shiselweni
8.	Simunye	8,762	5,633	6,512	Lubombo
9.	Siteki	2,271	4,157	6,152	Lubombo
10.	Piggs Peak	3,223	4,581	5,750	Hhohho
11.	Lobamba		3,625	4,557	Hhohho
12.	Ngomane		3,902	4,511	Lubombo
13.	Vuvulane		3,594	4,155	Lubombo
14.	Mpaka	1,007	2,144	3,586	Lubombo
15.	Kwaluseni		2,701	3,395	Manzini
16.	Bhunya	3,361	2,650	3,046	Manzini
17.	Mhlambanyatsi	2,075	2,553	2,886	Manzini
18.	Mondi	2,886	2,703	2,872	Hhohho
19.	Tabankulu	4,651	2,551	2,815	Lubombo
20.	Hlatikulu	1,276	2,076	2,748	Shiselweni
21.	Bulembu	4,850	2,443	2,260	Hhohho
22.	Kubuta		1,750	2,038	Shiselweni
23.	Tjaneni	3,682	2,250	1,899	Lubombo
24.	Sidvokodvo	1,339	1,528	1,746	Manzini
25.	Lavumisa	850	1,117	1,300	Shiselweni
26.	Ngwenya	445	842	1,281	Hhohho
27.	Nsoko	2,868	963	1,175	Lubombo
28.	Mankayane	913	1,040	1,144	Manzini
