= Tambuti Airfield =

Airport in Eswatini

- IATA: none; ICAO: FDBT

Summary
- Serves: Big Bend
- Elevation AMSL: 600 ft (180 m)
- Coordinates: 26°44′10″S 31°46′35″E

Map
- Location of the airport in Eswatini

Runways
Direction	Length		Surface
Direction	m	ft	Surface
15/33	800	2,625	Grass
- Source: GCM Google Maps SkyVector

Tambuti Airfield (ICAO: FDBT) is an airstrip serving the sugar plantation region around Big Bend, a town in the Lubombo Region of Eswatini. The airport is 16 kilometres (9.9 mi) west-northwest of Big Bend.

The Ubombo non-directional beacon (Ident: UB) is located 8.9 nautical miles (16.5 km) east-southeast of the airport.

== See also ==
- Transport in Eswatini
- List of airports in Eswatini
