= Bhunya Airfield =

Airfield in Eswatini

- IATA: none; ICAO: none

Summary
- Serves: Bhunya, Eswatini
- Elevation AMSL: 4,910 ft / 1,497 m
- Coordinates: 26°35′00″S 30°56′35″E

Map
- Location of the airport in Eswatini

Runways
Direction	Length		Surface
Direction	m	ft	Surface
14/32	1,250	4,101	Gravel
- Source: Google Maps FallingRain

Bhunya Airfield is a rural airstrip serving Bhunya, a forest products community in the Manzini Region of Eswatini. It is 8 kilometres (5 mi) southwest of the town.

The Matsapha VOR-DME (Ident: VMS) is located 20.9 nautical miles (38.7 km) east of the airstrip.

The Google Earth Historical Imagery (6/2/2018) image shows the runway and airstrip boundary have been planted with trees.

== See also ==
- Transport in Eswatini
- List of airports in Eswatini
