= Simunye Airfield =

Airfield in Eswatini

- IATA: none; ICAO: FDSM

Summary
- Airport type: Public
- Serves: Simunye
- Elevation AMSL: 673 ft / 205 m
- Coordinates: 26°11′45″S 31°55′50″E

Map
- Location of the airport in Eswatini

Runways
Direction	Length		Surface
Direction	m	ft	Surface
05/23	935	3,068	Grass
- Source: GCM Google Maps SkyVector

Simunye Airfield (ICAO: FDSM) is an airstrip serving Simunye, a town in the Lubombo Region of Eswatini.

The marked runway has a 150 metres (492 ft) unpaved overrun on the northeast end.

The Sikhuphe VOR-DME (Ident: VSK) is located 15.9 nautical miles (29.4 km) southwest of the airstrip.

== See also ==
- List of airports in Eswatini
- Transport in Eswatini
