= Nsoko Airfield =

Airfield in Eswatini

- IATA: none; ICAO: FDNS

Summary
- Airport type: Private
- Serves: Nsoko
- Elevation AMSL: 614 ft / 187 m
- Coordinates: 26°59′10″S 31°56′15″E

Map
- Location of the airport in Eswatini

Runways
Direction	Length		Surface
Direction	m	ft	Surface
01/19	1,210	3,970	Gravel
- Source: GCM Google Maps

Nsoko Airfield (ICAO: FDNS) is an airstrip serving Nsoko, an agricultural village in the Lubombo Region of Eswatini. The runway is within the Nisela Game Reserve, 4 kilometres (2.5 mi) northeast of Nsoko, and 5 kilometres (3.1 mi) west of the South African border.

The Ubombo non-directional beacon (Ident: UB) is 12.1 nautical miles (22.4 km) north of the runway.

== See also ==
- Transport in Eswatini
- List of airports in Eswatini
