= Ubombo Ranches Airfield =

Airfield in Eswatini

Ubombo Ranches Airfield Big Bend
- IATA: none; ICAO: FDUB

Summary
- Airport type: Public
- Serves: Big Bend
- Elevation AMSL: 465 ft / 142 m
- Coordinates: 26°46′10″S 31°56′14″E

Map
- Location of the airport in Eswatini

Runways
Direction	Length		Surface
Direction	m	ft	Surface
01/19	810	2,657	Grass
- Source: GCM Google Maps

Ubombo Ranches Airfield (ICAO: FDUB) is an airport serving the sugar refinery town of Big Bend in Lubombo Region, Eswatini. The runway is just west of the refinery.

The Ubombo non-directional beacon (Ident: UB) is on the field.

== See also ==
- Transport in Eswatini
- List of airports in Eswatini
