= Nhlangano Airfield =

Airfield in Eswatini

- IATA: none; ICAO: FDNH

Summary
- Airport type: Public
- Serves: Nhlangano
- Elevation AMSL: 3,525 ft / 1,074 m
- Coordinates: 27°07′10″S 31°12′45″E

Map
- Location of the airport in Eswatini

Runways
Direction	Length		Surface
Direction	m	ft	Surface
09/27	710	2,329	Grass
- Source: GCM Google Maps SkyVector

Nhlangano Airfield (ICAO: FDNH) is an airport serving Nhlangano, a town in the Shiselweni Region of Eswatini.

The runway is on the southeast side of the town, and has an additional 85 metres (279 ft) of unpaved overrun on each end.

== See also ==
- Transport in Eswatini
- List of airports in Eswatini
