= Kubuta Airfield =

Airfield in Eswatini

- IATA: none; ICAO: FDKB/FDKS

Summary
- Serves: Kubuta
- Elevation AMSL: 1,590 ft / 485 m
- Coordinates: 26°52′53.5″S 31°29′20″E

Map
- Location of the airport in Eswatini

Runways
Direction	Length		Surface
Direction	m	ft	Surface
10/28	850	2,789	Grass
- Source: GCM Google Maps

Kubuta Airfield (ICAO: FDKS/FDKB) is a rural airstrip serving Kubuta, an Inkhundla in the Shiselweni Region of Eswatini.

The Matsapha VOR-DME (Ident: VMS) is located 23.8 nautical miles (44.1 km) north-northwest of the runway.

== See also ==
- Transport in Eswatini
- List of airports in Eswatini
