= Tshaneni Airfield =

Airstrip in Tshaneni, Eswatini

- IATA: none; ICAO: FDTS

Summary
- Airport type: Public
- Serves: Tshaneni
- Elevation AMSL: 1,020 ft / 311 m
- Coordinates: 25°59′10″S 31°45′05″E

Map
- Location of the airport in Eswatini

Runways
Direction	Length		Surface
Direction	m	ft	Surface
18/36	1,040	3,412	Grass
- Source: GCM Google Maps

Tshaneni Airfield (ICAO: FDTS) is an airstrip serving Tshaneni, in Eswatini.

The Sikhuphe VOR-DME (Ident: VSK) is located 23.5 nautical miles (43.5 km) south of Tshaneni. The Matsapha VOR-DME (Ident: SZ) is located 32.4 nautical miles (60.0 km) south-southeast of the airstrip.

== See also ==
- Transport in Eswatini
- List of airports in Eswatini
