= Van Eck Dam =

Artificial reservoir in Eswatini

Coordinates: 26.775°S 31.923°E

Van Eck Dam is an artificial reservoir within the Mhlosinga Nature Reserve, near Big Bend in the Lubombo District of Eswatini. Covering an area of 187 hectares, it is an important site for waterfowl and other waterbirds, as well as animals such as the Nile crocodile and hippopotamus. It has been recognised as a wetland of international importance under the Ramsar Convention.
