= Siteki Airfield =

Airfield in Eswatini

- IATA: none; ICAO: FDST

Summary
- Serves: Siteki
- Elevation AMSL: 2,220 ft / 677 m
- Coordinates: 26°28′20″S 31°56′34″E

Map
- Location of the airport in Eswatini

Runways
Direction	Length		Surface
Direction	m	ft	Surface
17/35	850	2,789	Grass
- Source: GCM Google Maps

Siteki Airfield (ICAO: FDST) is an airstrip serving Siteki, a town in the Lubombo Region of Eswatini. The runway is 2 kilometres (1.2 mi) south of the town.

The Sikhuphe VOR-DME (Ident: VSK) is located 13.3 nautical miles (24.6 km) northwest of the airstrip. There are wooded ravines east and south of the runway.

== See also ==
- List of airports in Eswatini
- Transport in Eswatini
