= Victor Sydney Leibbrandt =

Swazi politician

Victor Leibbrandt
- Born: 1924 (age 101–102)
- Other name: Gcogca Leibbrandt
- Alma mater: University of the Witwatersrand (MBBCh, 1947)
- Occupation: Politician
- Known for: Minister of Works, Power and Communications of Swaziland

Victor Sydney Leibbrandt (also known as Gcogca Leibbrandt) was a politician from Swaziland who was a Minister of Works, Power and Communications. He was a member of the Senate in the early 1970s and later a member of the House of Assembly.

He graduated in medicine from the University of the Witwatersrand in 1947. His publications included Notes on Tradition and Religion in Swaziland (1972). He was supportive of the intervention of the King during the 1973 constitutional crisis.

== Early life and education ==
Victor Sydney Leibbrandt was born in 1924 and was baptised at Bergville, Natal on 28 September 1924. The parish register index records his parents as Douglas Herbert Leibbrandt and Vera Louise Leibbrandt.

Leibbrandt graduated from the University of the Witwatersrand in 1947 with the degree of Bachelor of Medicine and Bachelor of Surgery (MBBCh).

== Political career ==
Leibbrandt was a senator by 1971, when he participated in a parliamentary debate on taxing undeveloped property.

Leibbrandt was elected to the House of Assembly on 27 October 1978. He was appointed Minister of Works, Power and Communications on 12 February 1979, as recorded in a government notice of March 1979. His tenure as Minister of Works, Power and Communications was noted by historian B. A. B. Sikhondze for short lived improvements to gravel roads between rural areas and urban areas in a study on rural economic development.

He represented Swaziland at the Sixth Commonwealth Health Ministers Meeting in Arusha, Tanzania in November 1980. Leibbrandt replaced Swaziland health minister Samuel Hynd, who was unable to attend due to cholera near Swaziland's borders. He led the delegation from Swaziland to the Plenipotentiary Conference of the International Telecommunication Union in Nairobi in 1982.

== Political views and writing ==
Leibbrandt supported the motion of the justice minister calling for King Sobhuza II to intervene in the constitutional dispute during the Senate debate on constitutional change on 12 April 1973. Leibbrandt argued that a constitution that was appropriate for England was not necessarily appropriate for Swaziland, given the differences in population, education, social conditions and development. The Senate passed the motion. On the same day, Sobhuza abrogated the independence constitution, dissolved Parliament and banned political parties, assuming supreme legislative, executive and judicial authority.

He was supportive of increased Swazi investment in land. Leibbrandt argued that unresolved demands for land reform could lead to revolution and that small farmers and businesses help sustain larger investors.

Leibbrandt published Notes on Tradition and Religion in Swaziland in Nhlangano in 1972. His 2013 history thesis, Thabani Thwala, attributes the view to Leibbrandt that missionaries encouraged young people to hold Swazi traditions, the monarchy and the country in contempt and that they contributed to a decline in moral standards.

In an interview with historian Nhlanhla Dlamini on 3 April 2004, Leibbrandt discussed schooling for children classified as Coloured in Swaziland. He recalled that schools for these children had been established because they were remaining at home without attending school.

== Personal life and property ==
Leibbrandt had children including Helen Ayiteyfio (1957–2012) whose mother was Kelinah Mdluli Leibbrandt.

Leibbrandt retained a life usufruct over properties at Matsapha and Nhlangano which were later the subject of litigation among members of his family. The subsequent sale and transfer of these properties were reversed by the Supreme Court of Swaziland in 2017. The court did not decide the remaining questions on the interpretation of the deeds of donation.
