= List of regions of Eswatini by Human Development Index =

This is a list of regions of Eswatini by Human Development Index as of 2023.

Rank	Region	HDI (2023)
High human development
1	Hhohho	0.713
Medium human development
–	Eswatini	0.695
2	Lubombo	0.691
3	Shiselweni	0.687
4	Manzini	0.683
