= Piggs Peak Airfield =

Airfield in Ngonini, Eswatini

- IATA: none; ICAO: FDNG

Summary
- Airport type: Public
- Serves: Piggs Peak
- Location: Ngonini
- Elevation AMSL: 1,410 ft / 430 m
- Coordinates: 25°47′55″S 31°24′45″E

Map
- Location of the airport in Eswatini

Runways
Direction	Length		Surface
Direction	m	ft	Surface
02/20	810	2,657	Grass
- Source: GCM Google Maps SkyVector

Piggs Peak Airfield (ICAO: FDNG) is an airport serving Piggs Peak in the Hhohho Region of Eswatini. The airport is at Ngonini, an agricultural village 24 kilometres (15 mi) northeast of Piggs Peak.

There is a power line that runs along the east side of the runway, and crosses the approach/departure path at the south end. The crossing cables are unmarked.

== See also ==
- Transport in Eswatini
- List of airports in Eswatini
