= Mhlume Airfield =

Airfield in Eswatini

- IATA: none; ICAO: FDMH

Summary
- Airport type: Public
- Serves: Mhlume
- Elevation AMSL: 928 ft / 283 m
- Coordinates: 26°01′30″S 31°48′35″E

Map
- Location of the airport in Eswatini

Runways
Direction	Length		Surface
Direction	m	ft	Surface
18/36	1,155	3,789	Grass
- Source: GCM Google Maps SkyVector

Mhlume Airfield (ICAO: FDMH) is an airstrip serving Mhlume, an agricultural town in the Lubombo Region of Eswatini. The runway is on the northwest corner of the town.

The Sikhuphe VOR-DME (Ident: VSK) is located 21.7 nautical miles (40.2 km) south of the airstrip. The Mhlume non-directional beacon (Ident: HL) is located on the field.

== See also ==
- Transport in Eswatini
- List of airports in Eswatini
