= Tambankulu Airfield =

Airfield in Eswatini

- IATA: none; ICAO: FDTM

Summary
- Airport type: Private
- Serves: Tambankulu
- Elevation AMSL: 811 ft (247 m)
- Coordinates: 26°06′25″S 31°55′10″E

Map
- Location of the airport in Eswatini

Runways
Direction	Length		Surface
Direction	m	ft	Surface
17/35	965	3,166	Grass
- Source: GCM Google Maps SkyVector

Tambankulu Airfield (ICAO: FDTM) is an airstrip serving Tambankulu, in Eswatini.

The Sikhuphe VOR-DME (Ident: VSK) is located 19.4 nautical miles (35.9 km) southwest of the airstrip.

== See also ==
- Transport in Eswatini
- List of airports in Eswatini
