= Mossel Bay Airport =

- IATA: MZY; ICAO: FAMO

Summary
- Airport type: Private
- Owner: Mossel Bay Municipality
- Operator: Mossel Bay Aero Club
- Location: Mossel Bay
- Elevation AMSL: 160 m / 526 ft
- Coordinates: 34°09′31″S 22°03′35″E
- Website: www.mosselbayaero.com
- Interactive map of Mossel Bay Airport

Runways
Direction	Length		Surface
Direction	m	ft	Surface
10/28	1,143	3,750	Asphalt

Helipads
Number	Length		Surface
Number	m	ft	Surface
7xH1	6	20	Concrete
- Sources: AIP

Mossel Bay Airport (IATA: MZY, ICAO: FAMO) is a small airport in the seaside town of Mossel Bay, located in the Western Cape province on the Garden Route of South Africa. It is privately licensed airport, owned by the Mossel Bay Municipality and managed by the Mossel Bay Aero Club.

== History ==
The original location of the Mossel Bay airport was in the area which is now as Asla Park, Kwanonqaba. It had to be relocated after that land was required for a low cost housing scheme in the late 1990s. The Mossel Bay Local Municipality acquired the land to build a new airport and facilities. This airport is leased to the Mossel Bay Aero Club until 2055.

== Facilities ==
The Airport has two runways, of which only the main runway is operational. The main runway is 1,143 m long and 18 m wide and orientated 10/28 (east west). Operations to the airport are thus restricted to aircraft with a maximum wingspan of 15 m and an outer main gear wheel span up to but not including 4,5 m.

The secondary runway is not maintained and not listed in the current version of the South African Aerodrome Information Publication (AIP).

There are 7 helipads of 6m diameter.
