= Matsapha Airport =

Airport in Manzini, Eswatini

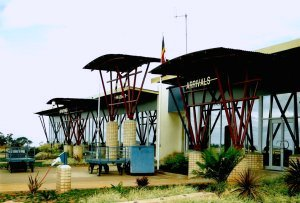
- The terminal in 2004
- IATA: MTS; ICAO: FDMS

Summary
- Airport type: Royal movements, flights of the Eswatini Government, mercy flights
- Operator: Eswatini Civil Aviation Authority (ESWACAA)
- Location: Manzini, Eswatini
- Elevation AMSL: 2,075 ft (632 m)
- Coordinates: 26°31′44″S 031°18′27″E

Map
- Location of the airport in Eswatini

Runways
Direction	Length		Surface
Direction	m	ft	Surface
07/25	2,600	8,530	Asphalt
- Source: DAFIF GCM

Matsapha Airport (IATA: MTS, ICAO: FDMS) is an airport located near Manzini, a city in Manzini District in the center-west of Eswatini. It serves flights of the Eswatini Government and mercy flights.

== History ==
Although a new airport for Manzini, King Mswati III International Airport, was inaugurated in March 2014, Airlink chose to continue flying to Matsapha. However, the Eswatini Civil Aviation Authority (ESWACAA) required the airline to end flights to Matsapha on 29 September 2014 and switch to King Mswati III Airport the following day.

The Matsapha Airport was still planned to be used by the royal family and the army. The airport recorded 70,000 passengers yearly until it closed. All the commercial flights had one destination, the O. R. Tambo International Airport in Johannesburg. The plan to replace the Matsapha Airport was announced in 2000 by King Mswati.

== Facilities ==
The airport is at an elevation of 2,075 feet (632 m) above mean sea level, the runway elevation is 2,075 feet (632 m). It has one runway designated 07/25 with an asphalt surface measuring 2,600 by 45 metres (8,530 ft × 148 ft).

== See also ==
- List of airports in Eswatini
- Transport in Eswatini
