= Nhlangano AIDS Training Information and Counseling Center =

Medical and health organisation in Eswatini

The Nhlangano AIDS Training Information and Counseling Center (NATICC) is a faith-based, non-profit NGO that provides information, training and counseling on HIV/AIDS in Nhlangano, Eswatini. The formation of the organization in 2002 was prompted by the fact that the Shiselweni region has continued to have high infection rates (42.5% in 2004) as compared to other regions in Eswatini.

NATICC is affiliated to the Free Evangelical Christian Fellowship of Eswatini. It is funded by Norwegian Agency for Development Cooperation, and Norwegian Church Aid. NATICC comprises a team of well-trained HIV/AIDS educators and counselors. The center is based at the Bethesda Mission Station in Nhlangano, but reaches out to the whole of the Shiselweni Region. NATICC is the Voluntary Counseling & Testing (VCT) Center for Nhlangano Town.

Since 2008, the Minister of Health in Eswatini has come from NATICC: first Benedict Xaba (2008–2013) and most recently Sibongile Ndlela-Simelane.
