= Maphiveni =

Village in northeastern eSwatini

Maphiveni is a village in northeastern eSwatini. It is located north of Simunye, close to the border with Mozambique.
