= Ngonini =

Village in Eswatini

Coordinates: 25°46′S 31°23′E

Ngonini is a village in the Hhohho Region of northern Eswatini. It is 25 kilometres (16 mi) northwest of Piggs Peak on route MR1, 7 kilometres (4 mi) from the border with South Africa.

It is served by Piggs Peak Airfield.

== The Ebenezer A.M.E church ==
Its an open map area situated along Piggs Peak -Matsamo road ...at Mgobodzi before Cleopas station just on your right when going to matsamo

Its an African Methodist Church which was officially opened in 2018 by Bishop Stafford Wicker from the United States of America. Its made of few families when opening the church Bro Mphumuzi Shongwe was the Trustees Proterm and sister Glenrose Mahlangu was the Steward Proterm under Rev Mehluko S Ndlangamandla
