= Regions of Eswatini =

- Also known as: Historic Divisions of Swaziland
- Subdivisions: 1 - Hhohho 2 - Manzini 3 - Lubombo 4 - Shiselweni; Sub-divisions: Tinkhundla, and sub-sub-divisions: Imiphakatsi

Eswatini (formerly Swaziland) is divided into four regions: Hhohho, Lubombo, Manzini, and Shiselweni. Each region is further divided into tinkhundla. There are 55 tinkhundla in Eswatini and each elects one representative to the House of Assembly of Eswatini. Tinkhundla are, in turn, divided into smaller imiphakatsi.

ISO 3166-2:SZ Map Key
Region #	Region	Capital	Area (km^{2})	Population (2023 census)	Density (per km^{2})
1	Hhohho	Mbabane	3,625.17	377,812	104.22
2	Manzini	Manzini	4,093.59	374,293	91.43
3	Lubombo	Siteki	5,849.11	248,594	42.5
4	Shiselweni	Nhlangano	3,786.71	235,427	62.17
