= King Mswati III International Airport =

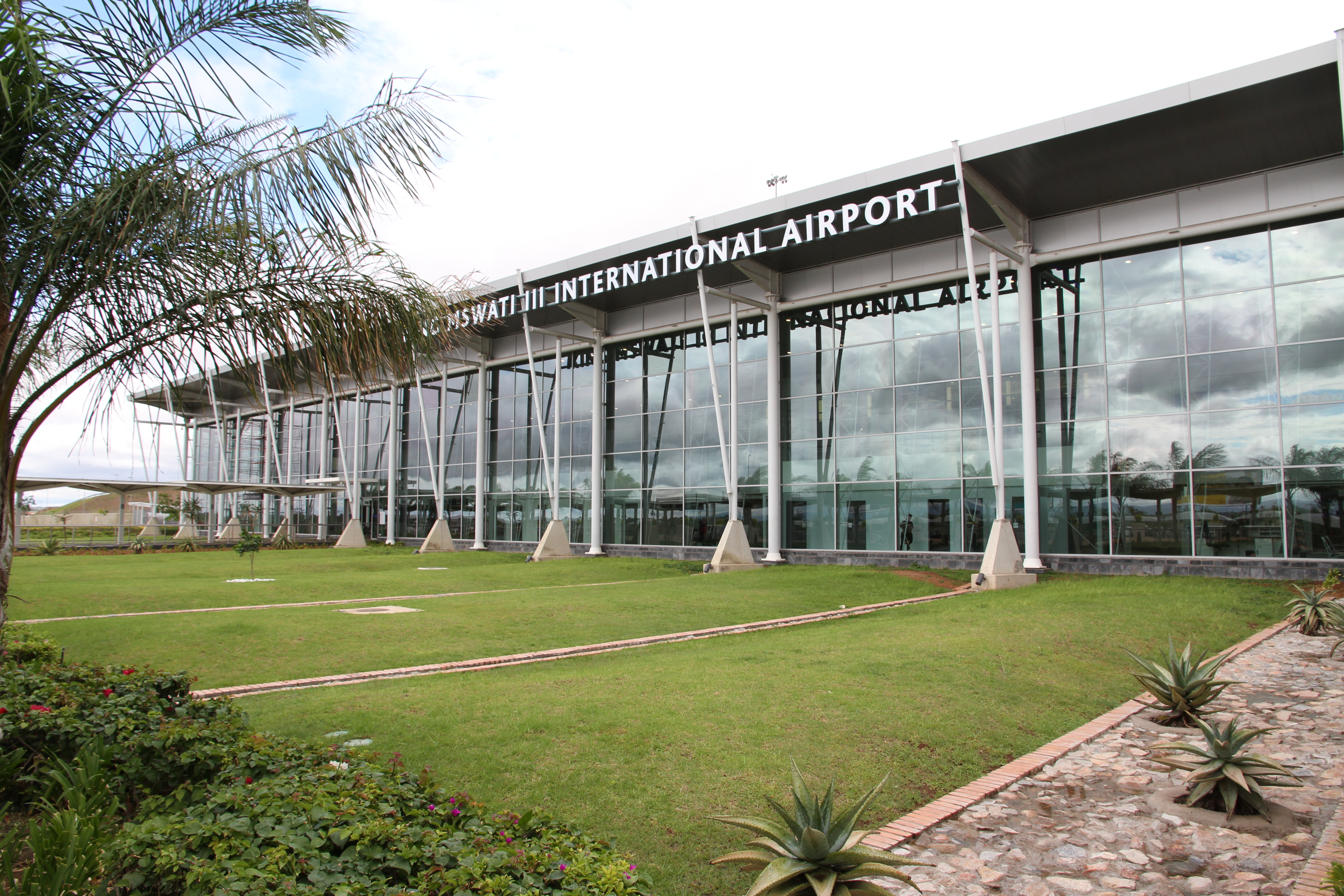
- IATA: SHO; ICAO: FDSK

Summary
- Airport type: Public
- Operator: Eswatini Civil Aviation Authority (ESWACAA)
- Location: Lubombo, Eswatini
- Elevation AMSL: 1,070 ft (330 m)
- Coordinates: 26°21′24″S 031°43′01″E
- Website: www.eswacaa.co.sz/kmiii-airport/

Map
- Airport location

Runways
Direction	Length		Surface
Direction	m	ft	Surface
02/20	3,600	11,810	Asphalt
- Source: DAFIF Google Earth

King Mswati III International Airport (IATA: SHO, ICAO: FDSK), is the primary international airport serving Eswatini. It replaced Matsapha Airport in 2014 as the only international airport in Eswatini that caters to commercial flights. It is designed to handle 360,000 passengers per year. The airport was initially named Sikhuphe International Airport in the planning and construction phase.

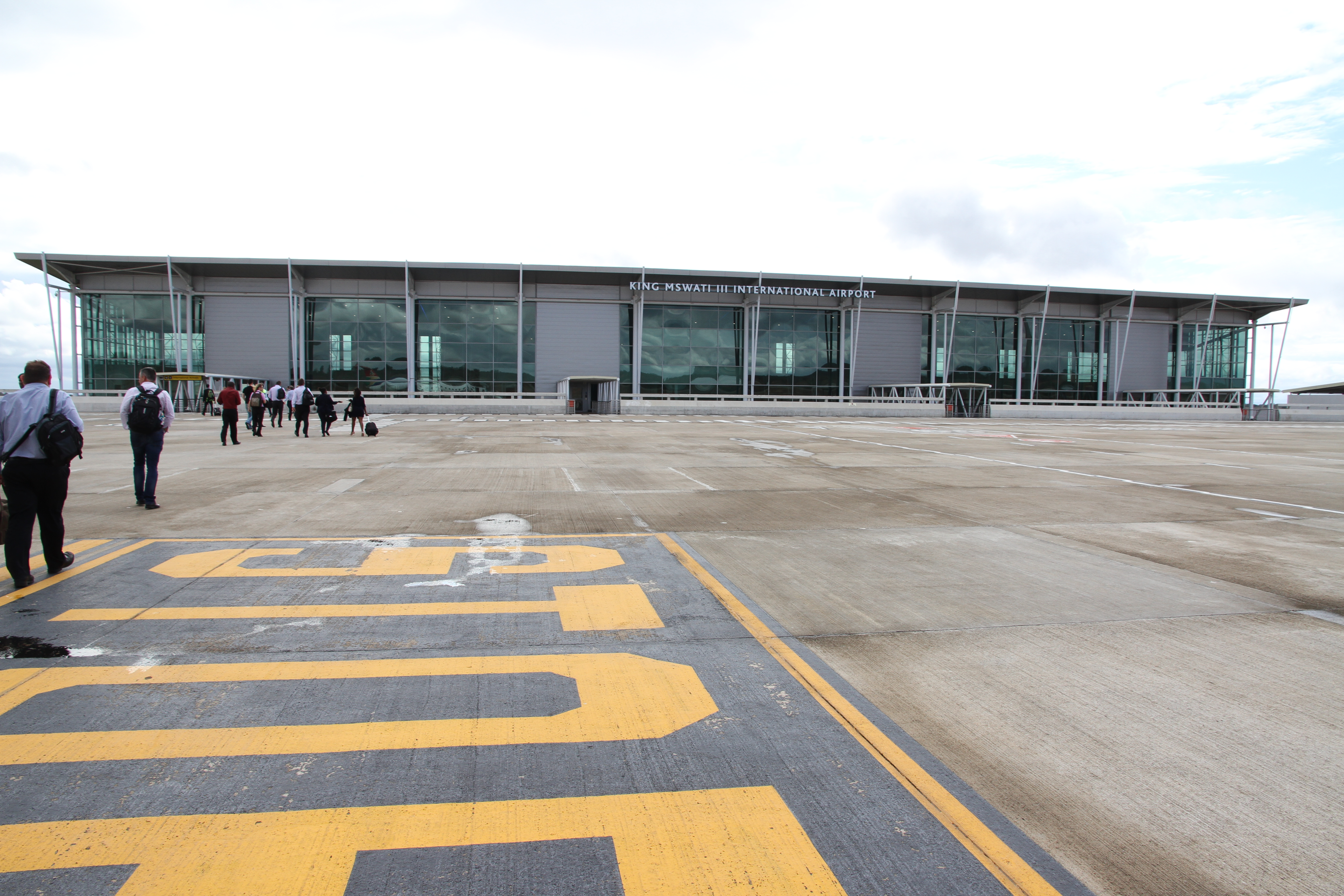
Airside view of terminal

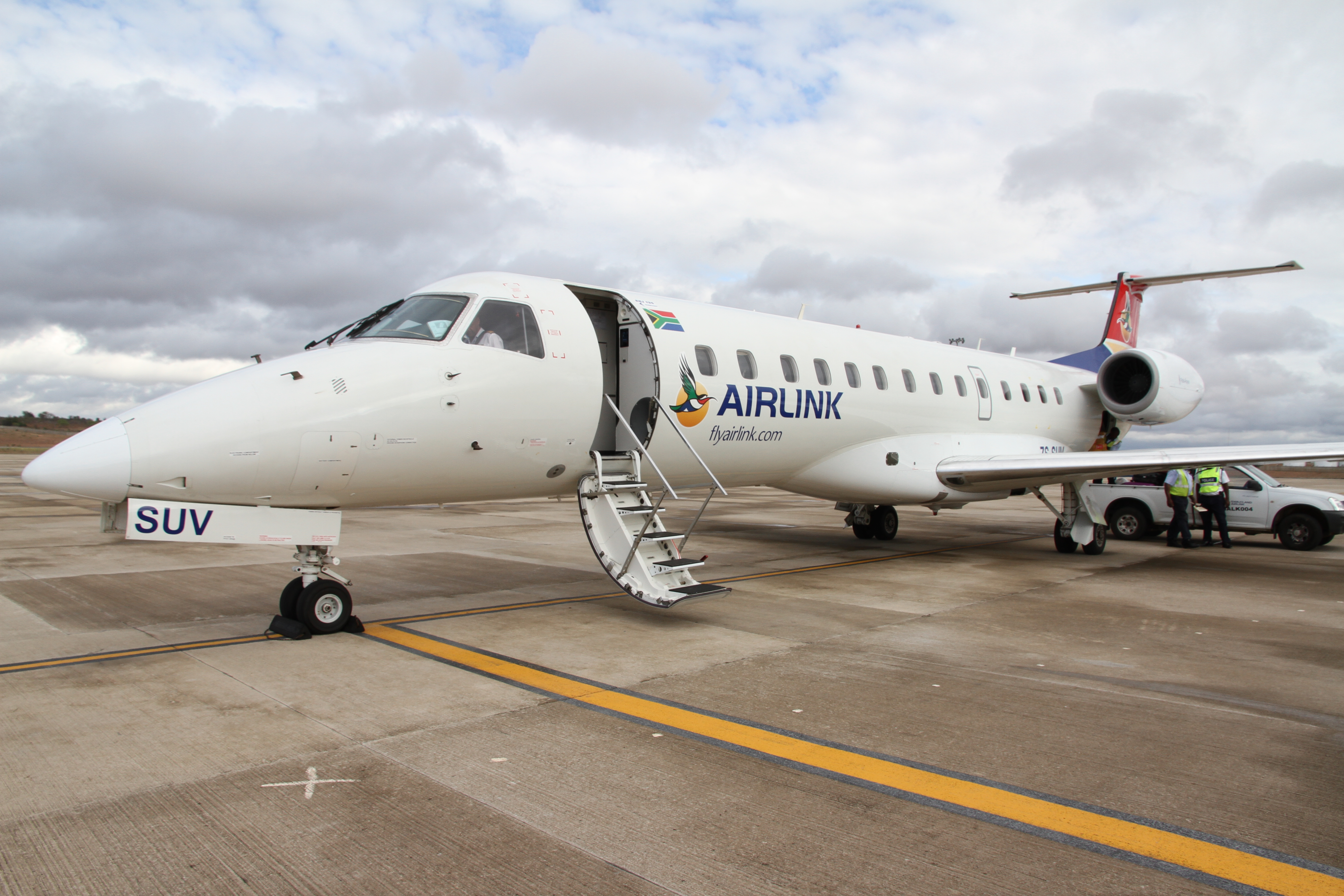
An Airlink Embraer 135 on the tarmac

== Construction ==
Construction began in 2003 on this US$150M project. The Taiwanese government contributed US$22M to the project.

It is part of King Mswati III's $1bn millennium project investment initiative to enhance Eswatini's position as a tourist destination, serving as a tourism gateway to Eswatini's game parks, either domestic or nearby located ones, such as Victoria Falls, Maputo, the Kruger National Park and KwaZulu-Natal game reserves. However, the airport has been on the drawing board since 1980, and since then Kruger Mpumalanga International Airport has opened and Maputo and Durban airports have been upgraded. There are also environmental concerns since Sikhuphe is near Hlane Royal National Park and may put rare species of eagles and vultures at risk.

King Mswati III International Airport was planned to replace Matsapha Airport by 2010, with the latter being taken over by the army.

King Mswati III International Airport was inaugurated on 7 March 2014, despite not yet having an IATA license to operate. Service began on 30 September 2014.

== Facilities ==
Plans include a 3,600m CAT 1 runway, and capacity for 300,000 passengers per year. It would be able to handle Boeing 747 aircraft, and service flights to any destination in the world.

== Airlines and destinations ==
Airlines	Destinations
Airlink	Johannesburg–O. R. Tambo
Eswatini Air	Cape Town, Durban, Harare, Johannesburg–O. R. Tambo
