= Kubuta =

Coordinates: 26°53′S 31°29′E

Kubuta is an inkhundla of Eswatini, located in the Shiselweni District. Its population as of the 2007 census was 6,922.
