= Tshaneni =

Coordinates: 25°59′S 31°43′E

Tshaneni is a town in northern Eswatini (Swaziland), near the border post on the South African border.

There are extensive sugar plantations around Tshaneni, and it is near the Sand River reservoir. It has an airstrip.

Tshaneni is overlooked by the Lubombo Mountains.

Tshaneni is in the lowveld of Eswatini. It is surrounded by game reserves, cattle ranches and sugar cane.
