= Simunye =

- Town
- Location within Eswatini
- Coordinates: 26°12′32″S 31°55′08″E
- Country: Eswatini
- District: Lubombo

Simunye is a sugar mill town on the lowveld in eastern Eswatini. Almost all of the residents of the town work for the Royal Eswatini Sugar Corporation's sugar mill located nearby.

== Location ==
The town is located about 30 kilometres (19 mi) south of the border crossing to South Africa (the border crossing is known as Bordergate on the Eswatini side and Mananga on the South African side) and about 20 kilometres (12 mi) from the border crossing to Mozambique (known as Lomahashaon the Eswatini side and Namaacha on the Mozambique side).

== Geography ==
It lies slightly west of the Lubombo Mountains, about 55 kilometres (34 mi) north-east of Siteki. The town is geographically only about 22 kilometres (14 mi) north-west of Mhlumeni on the eastern border, but because of the mountain range it is probably faster 100 kilometres (62 mi) by road detouring southwards through Siteki.

== Sport ==
The town is home to the Royal Leopards F.C. RSSC United FC is a football club that was the result of the merger between Mhlume United and Simunye FC.

== Schools ==
The town which is an RESC Estate town, has a number of schools and pre-schools. Thembelisha Preparatory School is the only private Primary school. There are two Government-aided primary schools, Ngomane primary school and Lusoti Primary school. Likewise, there are two High Schools, Ngomane High School and Lusoti High School. The Lusoti schools are right within the village, whilst the Ngomane schools are 23 kilometres (14 mi) away.
