= Nsoko =

Town in Eswatini

Coordinates: 27°02′S 31°57′E

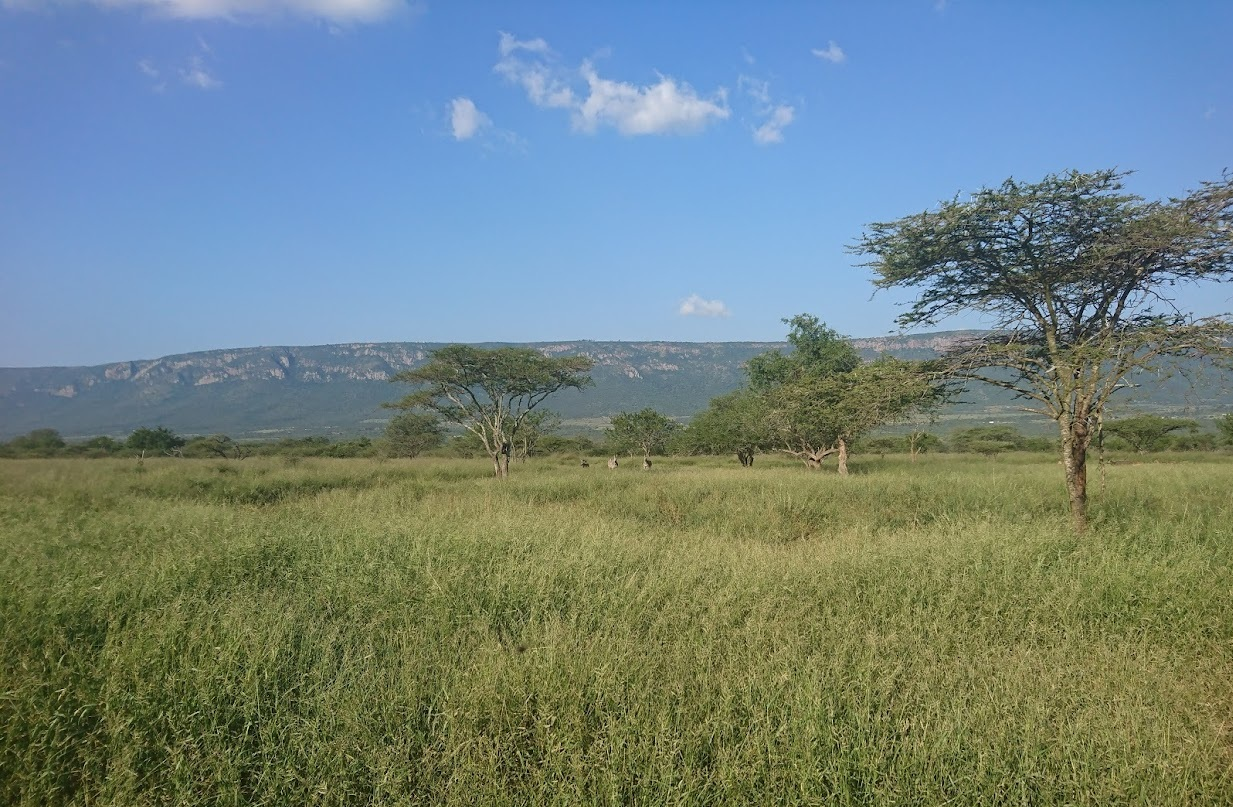
The wilderness of Nsoko with the Lebombo Mountains in the distance.

Nsoko is a town in southern Eswatini located in the Lubombo region about five kilometres (3.1 mi) from the border with South Africa. It lies about 65 kilometres (40 mi) north-east of Lavumisa and 45 kilometres (28 mi) south-east of Maloma. The town lies on the Ngwavuma river.

This small town was under the governance of one of the Mbokane Chiefs in the pre-1800. In Nsoko, the wet season is hot, muggy, and mostly clear and the dry season is warm and clear. Based on the pool score, the best time of year to visit Nsoko for hot-weather activities is from late February to mid May.
