= Manzini =

Largest city of Eswatini

- City
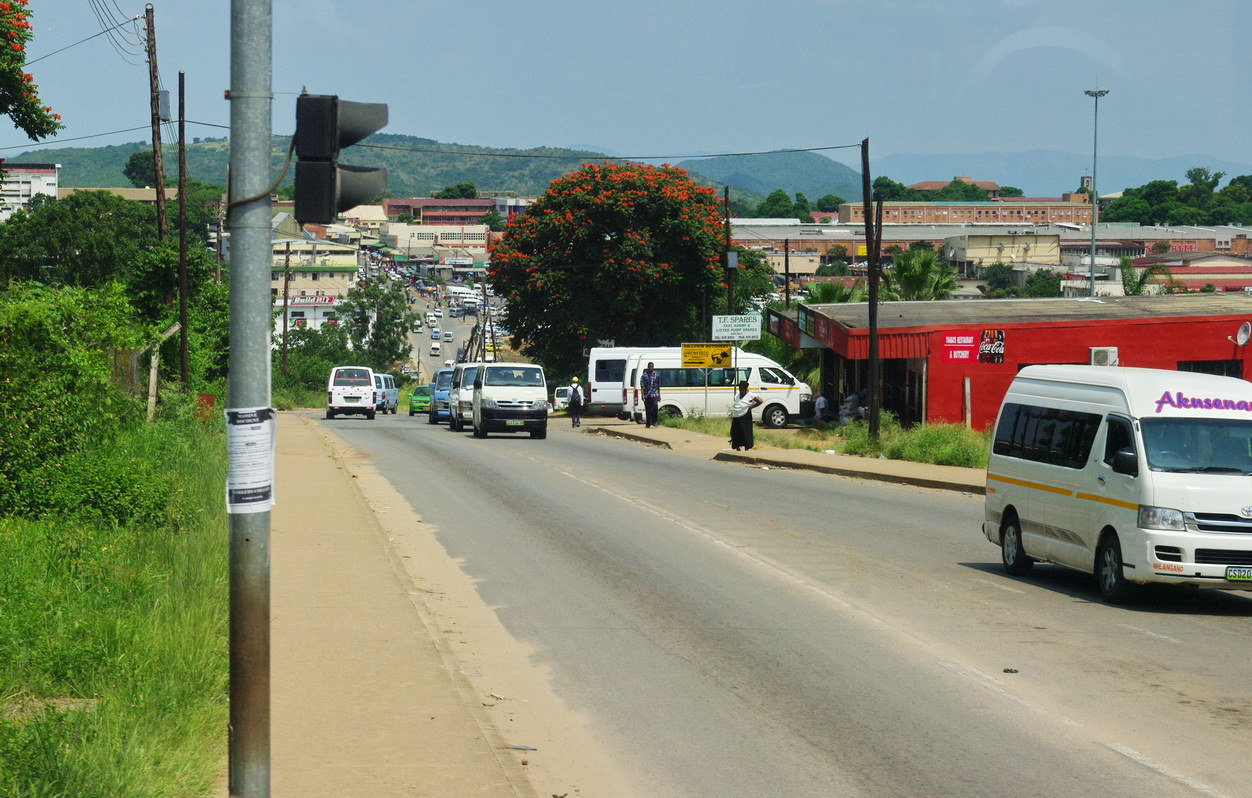

- Location within Eswatini
- Coordinates: 26°29′0″S 31°22′0″E
- Country: Eswatini
- Region: Manzini Region

Government
  - Mayor: Wesley Dlamini

Population (2008)
  - Total: 78,000
- Website: mzcitycouncil.sz

Manzini (formerly Bremersdorp) is a large city in Eswatini, which is also the city of Eswatini's Manzini Region. The city is the country's second largest urban center behind the capital Mbabane, with a population of 110,000 (2008). It is known as "The Hub" of Eswatini and lies on the MR3 road. Eswatini's primary industrial site at Matsapha lies near the town's western border.

== History ==
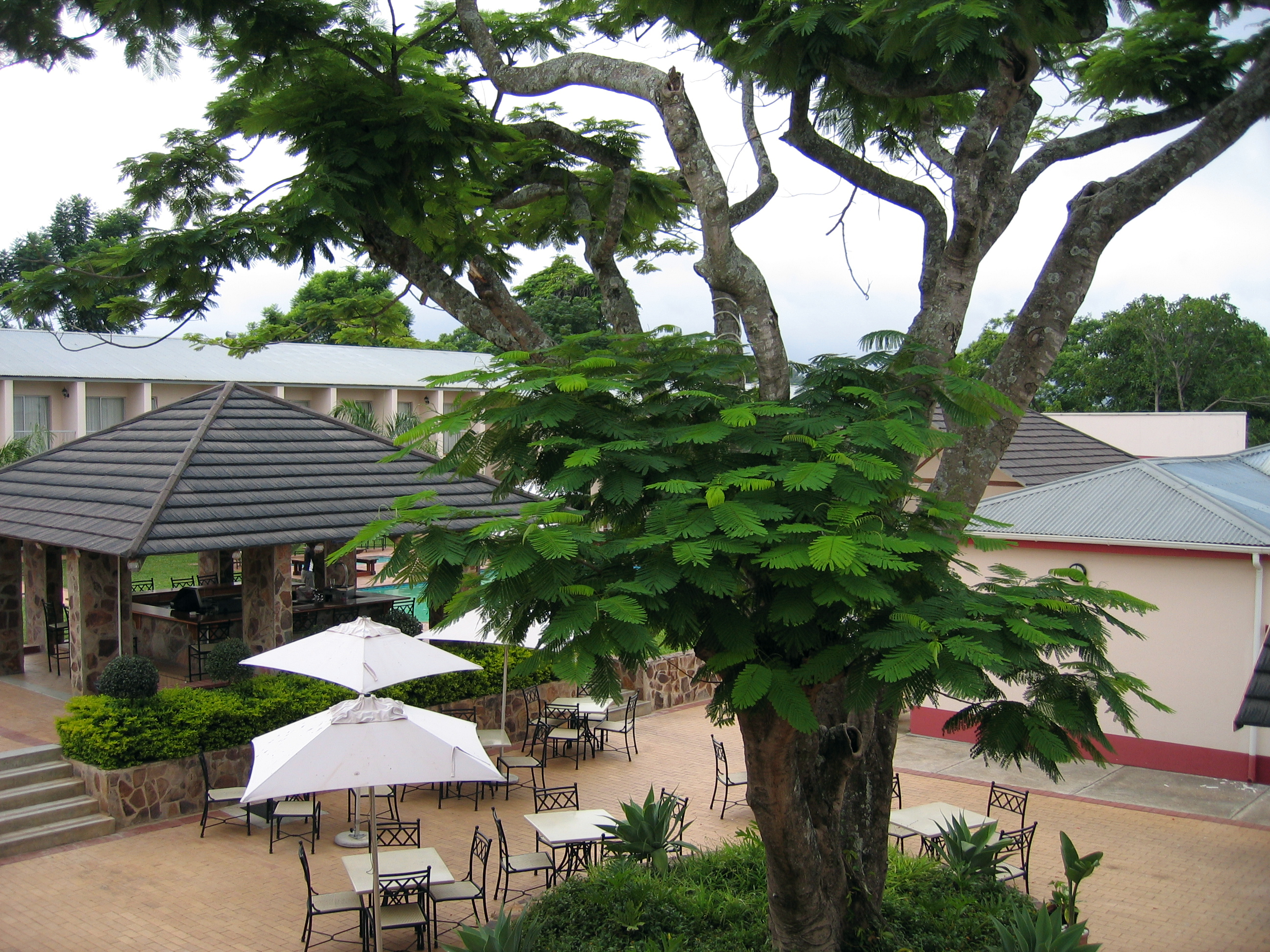
Ex Tum's George Hotel in Manzini

A commercial center from the time a trading post was opened in 1885, Bremersdorp was designated a township in 1898. Arthur Bremer sold his hotel for use to British Colonial authorities who had administered Swaziland since 1894 as their national administrative headquarters, and stipulated that the settlement would bear his name (dorp is the Afrikaans word for "village"). The name reverted to its original Swazi name, Manzini, in 1960 in honor of Chief Manzini Mbokane who was one of the trusted confidant and senior indvuna of King Mbandzeni. Chief Manzini Mbokane was the father to Ntengu kaGama Mbokane.

The town was a British/Boer colonial headquarters from 1890, but was destroyed in 1902 amid the Anglo-Boer War when the administrative center was transferred to Mbabane. However, Bremersdorp subsequently remained the commercial, agricultural, and transportation heart of Swaziland, earning the town the nickname "The Hub." Since its inception in the 1920s, the Agricultural and Mechanical Show (name later changed to the Swaziland International Trade Fair) has been the country's largest and best-attended annual event.

In 1915, the first hotel since Bremersdorp's post-Anglo/Boer War reconstruction was opened on the banks of the Mzimene River. Named the Riverside Hotel, it remained opened until 1997, changing its name over the years to the Manzini Arms Hotel and in the 1990s the Velebantfu Hotel. The buildings were intact after closure for several years but were leveled in 2008 by private developers. A shopping mall opened on the site in 2011.

Opened in the 1970s, Matsapha International Airport, Swaziland's only commercial airport, lay 10 km. to the west. As of 2014, Matsapha closed, and King Mswati III International Airport, 56.9 km east, is the new international airport. Manzini is the closest urban center. Agricultural Bank of China is a major financier of the new international airport.

Manzini was declared a city in 1994, when its administrative apparatus, the Manzini Town Council, became the Manzini City Council.

Manzini is home to a Nazarene High School, which has a successful school choir.

== Geography ==
Residential areas radiate outward from the Central Business District. At the western terminus of the city on the highway to Mbabane is KaKhoza Township, a poor neighborhood with the appearance of an informal settlement. North of downtown beyond the Mavuso International Trade Fair (opened 2004) along a bypass road (opened 1994, rebuilt 2004 for the opening of the Mavuso Trade Fair) is Helemesi Estates. Here middle-class dwellings were erected in the early 1990s on the former farm of Sydney Williams, the long-serving Resident Commissioner during British rule. Helemesi is the SiSwati corruption of the name Williams. The housing development is surrounded by Fairview Township, developed in 1964 during the twilight of colonial rule as Eswatini's first integrated residential neighborhood. The 19th-century law, reaffirmed by ordinances in the 1920s, forbade Swazis from residing or owning businesses in Bremserdorp. Until the 1960s Swazi business proprietors used Europeans as fronts in order to operate "Native Eating Houses" and other establishments.

The popularity of Fairview Township prompted the expansion of the area north of a hill occupied at its summit by St. Paul's Methodist Church and School, beside a landmark water tower. The newer development was named Fairview North and the original development became Fairview South.

Upscale residential neighborhoods were erected to the east of downtown, beginning with Coates Valley in the 1960s. Extension 6 north of Coates Valley is predominantly middle-class homes and abuts a planned community of up-market properties, Madonsa Township. Large homes were erected at Madonsa Township from the 1990s until all lots were developed ten years later.

South of downtown is the sprawling lower and middle-class Ngwane Park Township developed from a private farm since the 1970s. However, most areas surrounding Manzini are rural Swazi Nation Land administered by chiefs.

Manzini has pockets of extreme poverty: informal settlements along the river, east of Coates Valley, and west between KaKhoza Township and the industrial town Matsapha.

== Transworld Radio Swaziland ==
There is a Christian radio station called Voice of the Church based in the city. It was established in 1995 and they had one transmitter by then.

== Climate ==
Manzini has a humid subtropical climate (Köppen: Cwa) with hot, rainy summers and mild, dry winters.

Climate data for Manzini
Month	Jan	Feb	Mar	Apr	May	Jun	Jul	Aug	Sep	Oct	Nov	Dec	Year
Mean daily maximum °C (°F)	28.5 (83.3)	28.1 (82.6)	27.3 (81.1)	25.8 (78.4)	24.4 (75.9)	22.4 (72.3)	22.6 (72.7)	23.9 (75.0)	25.6 (78.1)	25.7 (78.3)	26.5 (79.7)	28.2 (82.8)	25.7 (78.4)
Mean daily minimum °C (°F)	18.6 (65.5)	18.6 (65.5)	17.7 (63.9)	15.1 (59.2)	12.0 (53.6)	8.9 (48.0)	9.1 (48.4)	10.7 (51.3)	13.3 (55.9)	14.9 (58.8)	16.3 (61.3)	17.9 (64.2)	14.4 (58.0)
Average rainfall mm (inches)	138.6 (5.46)	141.6 (5.57)	103.2 (4.06)	64.5 (2.54)	17.9 (0.70)	8.3 (0.33)	12.1 (0.48)	23.6 (0.93)	55.9 (2.20)	108.3 (4.26)	131.7 (5.19)	117.4 (4.62)	923.1 (36.34)
Average rainy days	11.5	8.3	9	5.8	2.6	1.4	1.7	3.5	5.5	9.3	13	10.9	82.5
Source: World Meteorological Organization

== Town twinning ==
Manzini is twinned with:

- Matsapha, Eswatini
- Lancaster, United States

== Notable people ==
Anna Jochemsen the paralympian skier, was born here in 1985.
