= Siteki =

- Location within Eswatini
- Coordinates: 26°27′S 31°57′E
- Country: Eswatini
- District: Lubombo
- Elevation: 619 m (2,031 ft)

Population (2013)
  - Total: 6,381

Siteki is a town in eastern Eswatini, lying west of the Lebombo Mountains, with an estimated population of 6,381 as of 2013. It is named for a declaration of Mbandzeni permitting his troops to marry. The town name was listed as Stegi in the 1966 census, and the population then was 1,457. The 1956 census counted 612 residents in Stegi.

It is also a place very dense populated in areas well known like Mzilikazi, along the road to town. It has two royal homes. Before Mzilikazi there is a Queen's home and then another one at Emoyen for the King.

Siteki is also a town that comprises different kinds of nations. As we know there is a refugee camp situated at Mpaka, thus for making a lot of mixed people trading around the town. It is served by Siteki Airfield.

It is the birthplace of politician and businesswoman Savannah Maziya.
