= Nhlangano =

- Town
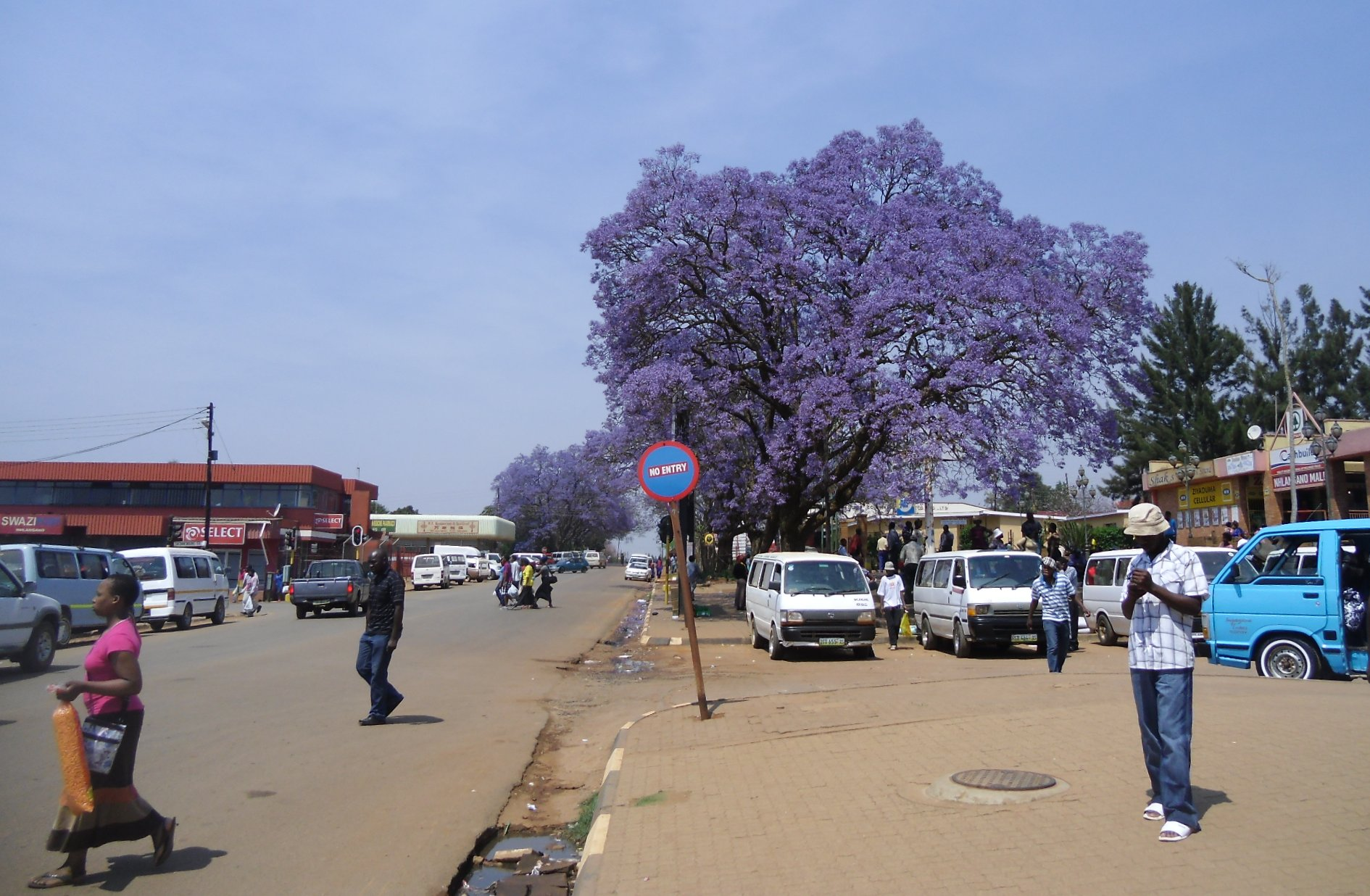
- Center of Nhlangano with flowering Jacaranda tree

- Location within Eswatini
- Coordinates: 27°7′S 31°12′E
- Country: Eswatini
- District: Shiselweni
- Named for: Swazi: nhlangano Meeting place
- Elevation: 1,050 m (3,440 ft)

Population (2005)
  - Total: 9,016
  - Rank: 4
- Climate: Cwb

Nhlangano (Swazi: [n̩ɬáŋanɔ]) is the fourth largest town in Eswatini. It is the capital of the southern district of Shiselweni. The town was formerly known as Goedgegun, but the name was changed to Nhlangano, meaning "the meeting place". Nhlangano is located beside the Ngwavuma River. King George VI of the United Kingdom met with King Sobhuza in the town in 1947 to thank him for the war effort during the Second World War. Nhlangano has a health center, a prison, a casino and an SOS Children's Village.

== Economy ==
In the 2020s the South African workwear manufacturer Jonsson Workwear built a 20,000 m^{2} garment factory in the town. In July 2026 Eswatini's minister of commerce, industry and trade, Manqoba Khumalo, told parliament that the E265-million plant was complete and that machinery installation would begin the following month, with up to 2,000 jobs projected at full capacity.

== See also ==
- Nhlangano AIDS Training Information and Counseling Center
