= Big Bend, Eswatini =

Big Bend
- Town
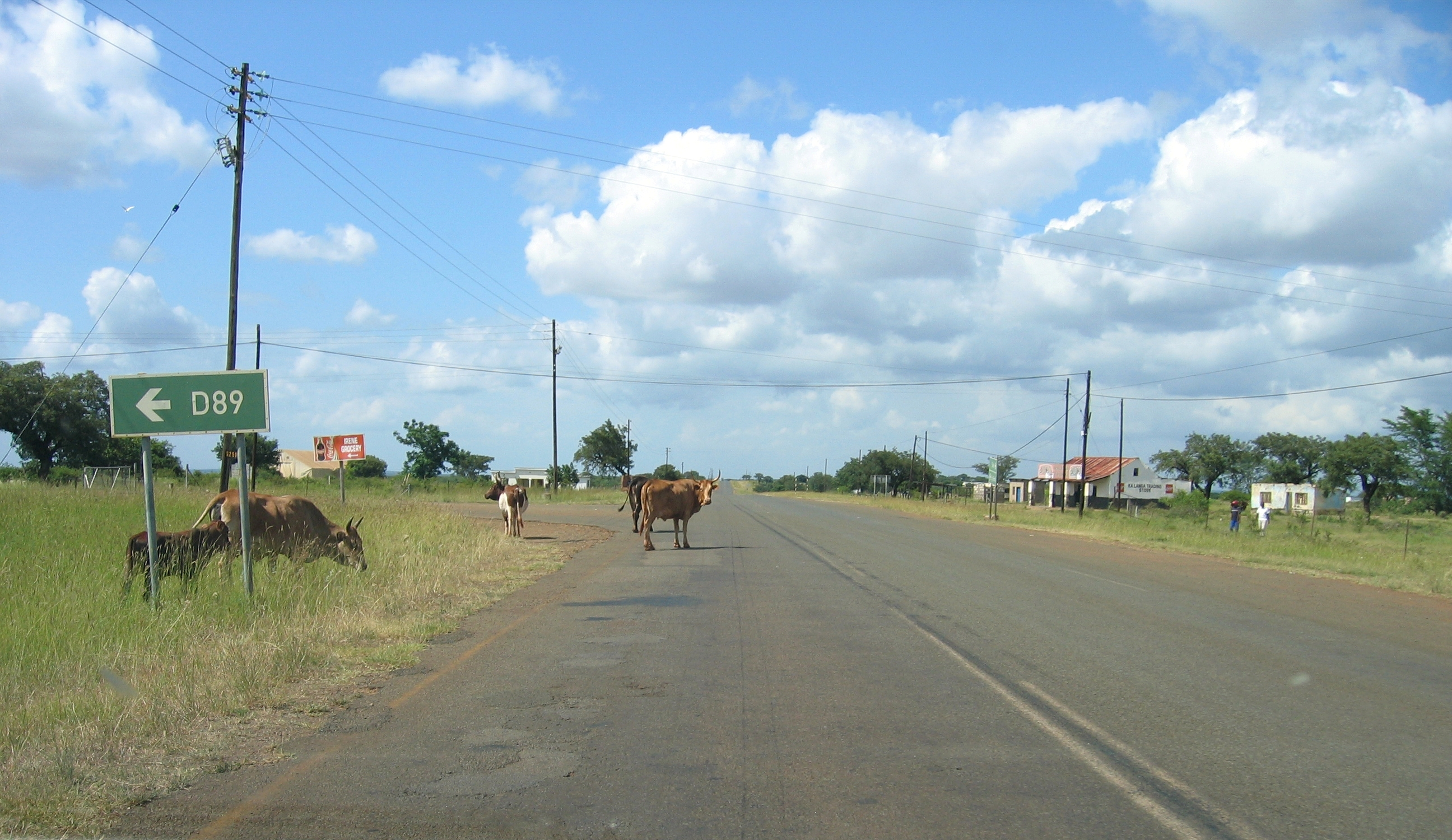
- View of Big Bend

- Location within Eswatini
- Coordinates: 26°49′S 31°56′E
- Country: Eswatini
- District: Lubombo
- Elevation: 354 ft (108 m)
- Time zone: UTC+02:00 (SAST)
- Postal code: L311
- Climate: BSh

Big Bend is a town in eastern Eswatini, lying on the Great Usutu River (Lusutfu). Its main industry is farming and it is based mostly on sugar plantations. Big Bend is also surrounded by nature/game reserves such as Mhlosinga Nature Reserve and Nisela Safaris.

== Schools ==
Big Bend has several schools, such as The Edu-care Centre which is a preschool which caters to Swazi and expatriate children along with its sister schools, Ubombo Primary School and Sisekelo High School. They were established in the late 1970s and have pioneered the high level of teaching excellence in the kingdom that paved the way for other schools to follow.

== Climate ==
Big Bend has a hot semi-arid climate (Köppen: BSh) with very hot and moderately rainy summers and warm, dry winters. The record high temperature is 44.3 °C (111.7 °F) on November 25, 2020. The lowest temperature to have ever been recorded in Eswatini, −6.7 °C (19.9 °F), was recorded at Big Bend.

Climate data for Big Bend
| Month | Jan | Feb | Mar | Apr | May | Jun | Jul | Aug | Sep | Oct | Nov | Dec | Year |
|---|---|---|---|---|---|---|---|---|---|---|---|---|---|
| Mean daily maximum °C (°F) | 32.2 (90.0) | 31.7 (89.1) | 30.6 (87.1) | 29.1 (84.4) | 27.0 (80.6) | 25.2 (77.4) | 25.2 (77.4) | 26.5 (79.7) | 28.4 (83.1) | 29.8 (85.6) | 30.2 (86.4) | 31.6 (88.9) | 29.0 (84.1) |
| Daily mean °C (°F) | 26.2 (79.2) | 26.0 (78.8) | 25.0 (77.0) | 22.8 (73.0) | 19.9 (67.8) | 17.3 (63.1) | 17.1 (62.8) | 19.0 (66.2) | 21.4 (70.5) | 23.4 (74.1) | 24.3 (75.7) | 25.6 (78.1) | 22.3 (72.2) |
| Mean daily minimum °C (°F) | 20.3 (68.5) | 20.4 (68.7) | 19.5 (67.1) | 16.6 (61.9) | 12.8 (55.0) | 9.4 (48.9) | 9.1 (48.4) | 11.5 (52.7) | 14.5 (58.1) | 17.1 (62.8) | 18.5 (65.3) | 19.6 (67.3) | 15.8 (60.4) |
| Average precipitation mm (inches) | 98 (3.9) | 75 (3.0) | 63 (2.5) | 32 (1.3) | 20 (0.8) | 9 (0.4) | 9 (0.4) | 12 (0.5) | 31 (1.2) | 51 (2.0) | 79 (3.1) | 82 (3.2) | 561 (22.3) |
Source: Climate-Data.org
