= Transport in Eswatini =

Public transport is the main means of transportation in Eswatini. Car ownership is low, at 89 cars per 1,000 people (2014), with a total of 297,000 vehicles on the local roads. The National Road Network has 1500 km of main roads and 2270 km of district roads.

== Roads ==
total: 3,594 km
paved: 1,078 km
unpaved: 2,516 km (2002)

Amongst its roadway network, the main roads are:

- MR1 Mbabane - Piggs Peak - Jeppes Reef, border with South Africa.
- MR3 Ngwenya, border with South Africa - Mbabane - Manzini - Hlane - Lomashasha, border with Mozambique. This is the most important highway.
- MR8 Manzini - Big Bend - Lavumisa, border with South Africa.
- MR9 Manzini - Nhlangano - Mahamba, border with South Africa.
- MR11 Nhlangano - Lavumisa, border with South Africa.
- MR19 Mbabane - Nertson, border with South Africa.

The MR3 road also includes a section, going from the Ngwenya border crossing, through Mbabane and until Manzini, with 4 lanes and has been upgraded as a motorway. This motorway section has a length of 56 km.

== Railways ==
total: 301 km (2008), 297 km; note - includes 71 km which are not in use (1997 est.)
narrow gauge: 301 km (2008), 297 km 1,067 mm (3 ft 6 in) gauge (1997 est.)

== Airports ==
The country's main airport is King Mswati III International Airport, which has a 3,600m runway. The other paved airport is Matsapha Airport

=== Other airports - with unpaved runways ===
total: 13
914 to 1,523 m: 6
under 914 m: 7 (2012)

== See also ==
- Eswatini
- List of airports in Eswatini
