= ICAO airport code =

Four-letter code designation for aviation facilities around the world

Map of countries labelled with their ICAO airport code prefixes and colour-coded according to each prefix's first letter

The ICAO airport code or ICAO location indicator is a four-letter code designating aerodromes around the world. These codes are defined by the International Civil Aviation Organization (ICAO) and published quarterly in ICAO Document 7910: Location Indicators.

They are used by air traffic control and airline operations such as flight planning. ICAO codes are also used to identify other aviation facilities such as weather stations, international flight service stations, or area control centers (and by extension their flight information regions), regardless of whether they are located at airports.

== History ==
The recommendations for ICAO airport codes were adopted on 24 March 1959, and came into force on 1 October the same year.

== ICAO codes versus IATA codes ==
ICAO codes are separate and different from the three-letter IATA codes, which are generally used for airline timetables, reservations, and baggage tags. For example, the IATA code for London's Heathrow Airport is LHR and its ICAO code is EGLL.

In general IATA codes are usually derived from the name of the airport or the city it serves, while ICAO codes are distributed by region and country. Far more aerodromes (in the broad sense) have ICAO codes than IATA codes, which are sometimes assigned to railway stations as well. The selection of ICAO codes is partly delegated to authorities in each country, while IATA codes, which have no geographic structure, must be decided centrally by IATA.

== Structure ==
The first one or two letters of the ICAO code indicate the country or large region of a country; the remaining letters identify the airport. For example, the ICAO code for Heathrow International Airport in London, is EGLL, with EG reflecting that it is based in the United Kingdom. By contrast, IATA codes do not provide geographic reference and do not enable one to deduce the location of the airport with any great certainty. For example, LHR represents Heathrow; whereas LHV is William T. Piper Memorial Airport in Lock Haven, Pennsylvania in the United States.

There are a few exceptions to the regional structure of the ICAO code for political or administrative reasons:

- RAF Mount Pleasant air base in the Falkland Islands, for instance, is assigned the ICAO code EGYP as though it were in the United Kingdom, but nearby civilian Port Stanley Airport is assigned SFAL, consistent with South America.
- Saint Pierre and Miquelon is controlled by France, and airports there are assigned LFxx as though they were in Europe.
- Kosovo is assigned the code BKxx grouping it with Greenland and Iceland rather than its geographical neighbors which have Lxxx (described below). This is because all prefixes starting with L have already been allocated to other countries. L is the only first letter for which this is the case.
- Jerusalem International Airport was assigned both LLJR (its Israeli persona) as well as OJJR (its Jordanian persona), but the airport itself fell into disuse.
- Western Sydney Airport, due to open in 2026 has the ICAO code YSWS. In Australia, the second letter is usually linked to the airport's FIR. However, Sydney's FIR has been non-existent since the introduction of TAAATS.

In the contiguous United States and Canada, many airports have ICAO codes that are simply copies of their three-letter IATA codes, with the geographical prefix added on (e.g., YEG and CYEG both refer to Edmonton International Airport, while IAD and KIAD both refer to Washington Dulles International Airport). This similarity does not extend to Alaska (PAxx), Hawaii (PHxx), or U.S. territories. Kahului Airport on Maui, for instance, has an IATA code of OGG and an ICAO code of PHOG.

ICAO airport codes do not begin with the following letters:

- I, though codes beginning with I (Ixx and Ixxx) are often used for navigational aids such as radio beacons
- J, but see below for its "ceremonial" use for the planet Mars
- Q; the Q code is reserved for international radiocommunications and non-geographical special use; ICAO Document 7910 uses this second provision to give the prefix of "QQ" to a "Conflict Zone Information Sharing Platform".
- X.

ICAO codes are sometimes updated. Johannesburg Airport in Johannesburg, South Africa, for instance, was formerly known as Jan Smuts International Airport, with code FAJS. When the airport was renamed O. R. Tambo International Airport, its ICAO code was updated to FAOR.

Some airports have two ICAO codes, usually when an airport is shared by civilian and military users. Frankfurt Airport in Frankfurt, Germany, for instance, has been assigned ICAO code EDDF while Rhein-Main Air Base was assigned ICAO code EDAF until its closure. Sion Airport in Switzerland has code LSGS while its military facilities have the ICAO code LSMS. Brussels Airport in Brussels, Belgium, has the ICAO code EBBR for its civilian facilities, and Melsbroek Air Base has been assigned ICAO code EBMB, even though the two airports share runways and ground and air control facilities.

== Pseudo ICAO-codes ==
In small countries like Belgium or the Netherlands, almost all aerodromes have an ICAO code. For larger countries like the UK or Germany this is not feasible, given the limited number of letter codes. While some countries have addressed this issue by requesting more prefixes, others have done so by introducing a scheme of sub-ICAO aerodrome codes; France, for example, assigns pseudo ICAO codes in the style LFddnn, where dd indicates the department while nn is a sequential counter. The French Federation of Ultralight Motorized Gliders was formally named the keeper of these codes. Aerodrome de Torreilles in France, for instance, has code LF6651. In Antarctica many aerodromes have pseudo ICAO-codes with AT and two digits, while others have proper codes from countries performing air control such as NZ for New Zealand.

In Russia, the Latin letter X, or its Morse/Baudot Cyrillic equivalent Ь, are used to designate government, military, and experimental aviation airfields in internal airfield codes similar in structure and purpose to ICAO codes but not used internationally.

ZZZZ is also a pseudo-code, used in flight plans for aerodromes with no ICAO code assigned.

The Mars helicopter Ingenuity started its flight program from a location at Jezero Crater and as the entire letter J range of ICAO codes was heretofore unassigned, ICAO "ceremonially" assigned the designation "JZRO" to the place the helicopter took off from for its first flight. Some have deduced that J must be the code for Mars, even though ICAO has never officially reserved it for this purpose.

== Prefixes ==
Prefix code	Country	Derivation of second letter
A – Western South Pacific
AG	Solomon Islands	Guadalcanal
AN	Nauru	Nauru
AY	Papua New Guinea	
B – Greenland, Iceland, and Kosovo (European Alternate)
BG	Greenland	Greenland
BI	Iceland	Iceland
BK	Kosovo	Kosovo
C – Canada
D – Eastern parts of West Africa and Maghreb
DA	Algeria	Algeria
DB	Benin	Benin
DF	Burkina Faso	Burkina Faso
DG	Ghana	Ghana
DI	Côte d'Ivoire	Côte d'Ivoire
DN	Nigeria	Nigeria
DR	Niger	Niger
DT	Tunisia	Tunisia
DX	Togo	
E – Northern Europe (EB-EG, EH-EY)
EB	Belgium	Belgium
ED	Germany (civil)	Deutschland
EE	Estonia	Estonia
EF	Finland	Finland
EG	United Kingdom (and Crown Dependencies)	Great Britain
EH	Netherlands	Holland
EI	Ireland	Ireland
EK	Denmark and the Faroe Islands	København
EL	Luxembourg	Luxembourg
EN	Norway	Norway
EP	Poland	Poland
ES	Sweden	Sweden
ET	Germany (military)	
EV	Latvia	Latvia
EY	Lithuania	
F – Most of Central Africa, Southern Africa, and the Indian Ocean (FA-FM, FN-FZ)
FA	South Africa	South Africa
FB	Botswana	Botswana
FC	Republic of the Congo	Congo
FD	Eswatini	Swaziland
FE	Central African Republic	
FG	Equatorial Guinea	Equatorial Guinea
FH	Saint Helena, Ascension and Tristan da Cunha	Saint Helena
FI	Mauritius	Mauritius
FJ	British Indian Ocean Territory	
FK	Cameroon	Kamerun (German)
FL	Zambia	Lusaka
FM	Comoros, France (Mayotte and Réunion), and Madagascar	Madagascar
FN	Angola	Angola
FO	Gabon	Gabon
FP	São Tomé and Príncipe	Principe
FQ	Mozambique	Mozambique
FS	Seychelles	Seychelles
FT	Chad	Tchad
FV	Zimbabwe	
FW	Malawi	Malawi
FX	Lesotho	
FY	Namibia	
FZ	Democratic Republic of the Congo	Zaïre
G – Western parts of West Africa and Maghreb
GA	Mali	Mali
GB	The Gambia	The Gambia
GC	Spain (Canary Islands)	Canary Islands
GE	Spain (Ceuta and Melilla)	España
GF	Sierra Leone	Freetown
GG	Guinea-Bissau	Guinea-Bissau
GL	Liberia	Liberia
GM	Morocco	Morocco
GO	Senegal	
GQ	Mauritania	
GS	Western Sahara	Western Sahara
GU	Guinea	Guinea
GV	Cape Verde	Cape Verde
H – East Africa and Northeast Africa
HA	Ethiopia	Addis Ababa
HB	Burundi	Burundi
HC	Somalia	
HD	Djibouti	Djibouti
HE	Egypt	Egypt
HH	Eritrea	
HJ	South Sudan	Juba
HK	Kenya	Kenya
HL	Libya	Libya
HR	Rwanda	Rwanda
HS	Sudan	Sudan
HT	Tanzania	Tanzania
HU	Uganda	Uganda
J – "Ceremonial" prefix for Mars; see above
K – Contiguous United States (KA-KH, KI-KP, KR-KZ)
L – Southern Europe, Israel, and Palestine (LA-LJ, LK-LZ)
LA	Albania	Albania
LB	Bulgaria	Bulgaria
LC	Cyprus and the United Kingdom (Akrotiri and Dhekelia)	Cyprus
LD	Croatia	Dalmatia
LE	Spain (mainland section and Balearic Islands)	España
LF	France (Metropolitan France, Saint-Pierre and Miquelon)	France
LG	Greece	Greece
LH	Hungary	Hungary
LI	Italy (and San Marino)	Italy
LJ	Slovenia	Ljubljana
LK	Czech Republic	Česko
LL	Israel	Israel
LM	Malta	Malta
LN	Monaco	Monaco
LO	Austria	Österreich
LP	Portugal (including the Azores and Madeira)	Portugal
LQ	Bosnia and Herzegovina	
LR	Romania	Romania
LS	Switzerland and Liechtenstein	Switzerland
LT	Turkey	Turkey
LU	Moldova	Chișinău
LV	Palestine/Occupied Palestinian territories	
LW	North Macedonia	
LX	Gibraltar	
LY	Serbia and Montenegro	Yugoslavia
LZ	Slovakia	
M – Central America, Mexico and northern/western parts of the Caribbean
MB	Turks and Caicos Islands	
MD	Dominican Republic	Dominican
MG	Guatemala	Guatemala
MH	Honduras	Honduras
MK	Jamaica	Kingston
MM	Mexico	Mexico
MN	Nicaragua	Nicaragua
MP	Panama	Panama
MR	Costa Rica	Costa Rica
MS	El Salvador	El Salvador
MT	Haiti	Haiti
MU	Cuba	Cuba
MW	Cayman Islands	
MY	Bahamas	
MZ	Belize	Belize
N – Most of the South Pacific and New Zealand
NC	Cook Islands	Cook Islands
NF	Fiji, Tonga	Fiji
NG	Kiribati (Gilbert Islands), Tuvalu	Gilbert Islands
NI	Niue	Niue
NL	France (Wallis and Futuna)	Wallis
NS	Samoa, United States (American Samoa)	Samoa
NT	France (French Polynesia)	Tahiti
NV	Vanuatu	Vanuatu
NW	France (New Caledonia)	New Caledonia
NZ	New Zealand, parts of Antarctica	New Zealand
O – Gulf States, Iran, Iraq, Pakistan, Jordan, West Bank
OA	Afghanistan	Afghanistan
OB	Bahrain	Bahrain
OE	Saudi Arabia	
OI	Iran	Iran
OJ	Jordan and the West Bank	Jordan
OK	Kuwait	Kuwait
OL	Lebanon	Lebanon
OM	United Arab Emirates	Emirates
OO	Oman	Oman
OP	Pakistan	Pakistan
OR	Iraq	Iraq
OS	Syria	Syria
OT	Qatar	Qatar
OY	Yemen	Yemen
P – Most of the North Pacific, and Kiribati
PA	US (Alaska) (also PF, PO and PP)	Alaska
PB	US (Baker Island)	Baker Island
PC	Kiribati (Canton Airfield, Phoenix Islands)	Canton Island
PF	US (Alaska) (also PA, PO and PP)	Fairbanks
PG	US (Guam, Northern Mariana Islands)	Guam
PH	US (Hawaii)	Hawaii
PJ	US (Johnston Atoll)	Johnston Island
PK	Marshall Islands	Kwajalein Atoll
PL	Kiribati (Line Islands)	Line Islands
PM	US (Midway Island)	Midway Atoll
PO	US (Alaska) (also PA, PF and PP)	
PP	US (Alaska) (also PA, PF and PO)	
PT	Federated States of Micronesia, Palau	Truk Atoll
PW	US (Wake Island)	Wake Island
R – Japan, S. Korea, Philippines
RC	Republic of China (Taiwan)	China
RJ	Japan (Mainland)	Japan
RK	South Korea (Republic of Korea)	Korea
RO	Japan (Okinawa)	Okinawa
RP	Philippines	Philippines
S – South America (SA-SC, SD-SH, SI, SJ, SK-SM, SN-SP, SQ, SS-SU, SV-SY)
SA	Argentina (including parts of Antarctica)	Argentina
SB	Brazil (also SD, SI, SJ, SN, SS and SW)	Brazil
SC	Chile (including Easter Island and parts of Antarctica) (also SH)	Chile
SD	Brazil (also SB, SI, SJ, SN, SS and SW)	
SE	Ecuador	Ecuador
SF	Falkland Islands	Falkland Islands
SG	Paraguay	Paraguay
SH	Chile (also SC)	
SI	Brazil (also SB, SD, SJ, SN, SS and SW)	
SJ	Brazil (also SB, SD, SI, SN, SS and SW)	
SK	Colombia (also SQ)	
SL	Bolivia	Bolivia
SM	Suriname	Suriname
SN	Brazil (also SB, SD, SI, SJ, SS and SW)	
SO	France (French Guiana)	
SP	Peru	Peru
SQ	Colombia (also SK)	
SS	Brazil (also SB, SD, SI, SJ, SN and SW)	
SU	Uruguay	Uruguay
SV	Venezuela	Venezuela
SW	Brazil (also SB, SD, SI, SJ, SN and SS)	
SY	Guyana	Guyana
T – Eastern and southern parts of the Caribbean
TA	Antigua and Barbuda	Antigua
TB	Barbados	Barbados
TD	Dominica	Dominica
TF	France (Guadeloupe, Martinique, Saint Barthélemy, Saint Martin)	France
TG	Grenada	Grenada
TI	US (U.S. Virgin Islands)	Virgin Islands
TJ	US (Puerto Rico)	San Juan
TK	Saint Kitts and Nevis	Saint Kitts
TL	Saint Lucia	Saint Lucia
TN	Caribbean Netherlands, Aruba, Curaçao, Sint Maarten	Netherlands
TQ	Anguilla	
TR	Montserrat	Montserrat
TT	Trinidad and Tobago	Trinidad and Tobago
TU	British Virgin Islands	
TV	Saint Vincent and the Grenadines	Saint Vincent
TX	Bermuda	
U – Former USSR except the Baltics or Moldova
UA	Kazakhstan	Almaty
UB	Azerbaijan	Baku
UC	Kyrgyzstan	
UD	Armenia	
UE	Russia (Yakutia)	
UG	Georgia	Georgia
UH	Russia (Far East)	Khabarovsk
UI	Russia (Eastern Siberia)	Irkutsk
UK	Ukraine	Ukraine
UL	Russia (Northwest)	Leningrad
UM	Belarus and Russia (Kaliningrad)	Minsk
UN	Russia (Western Siberia)	Novosibirsk
UO	Russia (Northern Siberia)	
UR	Russia (Southern)	Rostov
US	Russia (Urals Region)	Sverdlovsk
UT	Tajikistan, Turkmenistan	Tajikistan
UU	Russia (Central)	
UW	Russia (Volga Region)	
UZ	Uzbekistan	Uzbekistan
V – Many South Asian countries, mainland Southeast Asia, Hong Kong and Macau
VA	India (West India)	
VC	Sri Lanka	Ceylon
VD	Cambodia	Cambodia
VE	India (East India)	
VG	Bangladesh	Bangladesh
VH	Hong Kong	Hong Kong
VI	India (North India)	
VL	Laos	Laos
VM	Macau	Macau
VN	Nepal	Nepal
VO	India (South India)	
VQ	Bhutan	
VR	Maldives	
VT	Thailand	Thailand
VV	Vietnam	Vietnam
VY	Myanmar	Yangon
W – Most of Maritime Southeast Asia
WA	Indonesia (also WI, WQ and WR)	
WB	Brunei, Malaysia (East Malaysia)	Brunei
WI	Indonesia (also WA, WQ and WR)	Indonesia
WM	Malaysia (Peninsular Malaysia)	Malaysia
WP	Timor-Leste	Portugal
WQ	Indonesia (also WA, WI and WR)	
WR	Indonesia (also WA, WI and WQ)	
WS	Singapore	Singapore
Y – Australia (including Norfolk Island, Christmas Island, Cocos (Keeling) Islands and Australian Antarctic Territory) (YA-YG, YH-YQ, YR-YZ)
Z – China, North Korea and Mongolia
ZB	Northern China	Beijing
ZG	Southern China	Guangzhou
ZH	Central China	Wuhan
ZJ	Hainan	
ZK	North Korea	North Korea
ZL	Northwestern China	Lanzhou
ZM	Mongolia	Mongolia
ZP	Yunnan	
ZS	Eastern China	Shanghai
ZU	Southwestern China	Chengdu
ZW	Xinjiang	Wulumuqi
ZY	Northeast China	Shenyang
ZZZZ	Special, used for when no other code exists	

== See also ==
- Airspace class
- Geocode
- IATA airport code
- ICAO airline designators – a list of codes
- International Board for Research into Aircraft Crash Events
- Lists of airports by IATA and ICAO code
