= Kgalagadi South =

Parliamentary constituency in the Kgalagadi District, 2004 onwards

- Single-member constituency for the National Assembly
- District: Kgalagadi District
- Population: 35,531
- Major settlements: Tsabong
- Area: 59,330 km^{2}

Current constituency
- Created: 2004
- Party: UDC
- Created from: Kgalagadi
- MP: Tokyo Modise
- Margin of victory: 2,840 (24.0 pp)

Kgalagadi South is a constituency in Kgalagadi District represented in the National Assembly of Botswana by Tokyo Modise of the Umbrella for Democratic Change (UDC) since the 2025 by-election.

== Constituency profile ==
Kgalagadi South is a sparsely populated parliamentary constituency in southwestern Botswana, located within the Kgalagadi District. The area lies largely within the Kalahari Desert's semi‑arid environment, characterized by dry plains, sparse vegetation and widely dispersed rural settlements. The administrative centre and largest village in the area is Tsabong. The constituency was created in 2004 by splitting the Kgalagadi constituency into two.

The rural and expansive constituency encompasses the following locations:

1. Tsabong
2. Bray
3. Werda
4. Makopong
5. Draaihoek
6. Khisa
7. Maraleleng
8. Omaweneno
9. Bokspits
10. Struizendam
11. Kokotsha
12. Maubelo
13. Maleshe
14. McCarthy's Rust
15. Kolonkwaneng
16. Bogogobo
17. Middlepits
18. Khuis
19. Gakhibana
20. Rapples Pan
21. Banyana Farms
22. Khawa
23. Boshoek
24. Vaalhoek

== Members of Parliament ==
Key: BDP BNF UDC

Election	Winner
2004 election	Neo Moroka
2009 election	John Toto
2014 election	Frans van der Westhuizen
2019 election	Sam Brooks
2024 election	Micus Chimbombi
2025 by-election	Tokyo Modise

== Election results ==
=== 2025 by-election ===
By-election 2025: Kgalagadi South
Party	Candidate	Votes	%	±%
UDC	Tokyo Modise	6,766	57.08	+2.17
BDP	Diana Kaartze	3,926	33.12	−5.19
BCP	Tshepang Brooks	946	7.98	N/A
Independent	Kealeboga Kapeko	116	0.98	N/A
BPF	Phenyo Sedimonyane	99	0.84	−5.94
Margin of victory		2,840	23.96	+7.36
Total valid votes		11,853	99.61	+0.76
Rejected ballots		46	0.39	−0.76
Turnout		11,899	~64.47	~−22.38
Registered electors		~18,457		
UDC hold		Swing	+3.68	

=== 2024 election ===
General election 2024: Kgalagadi South
Party	Candidate	Votes	%	±%
UDC	Micus Chimbombi	8,700	54.91	+11.80
BDP	Diana Kaartze	6,070	38.31	−13.92
BPF	Phenyo Sedimonyane	1,074	6.78	N/A
Margin of victory		2,630	16.60	N/A
Total valid votes		15,844	98.85	−0.37
Rejected ballots		185	1.15	+0.37
Turnout		16,029	86.85	−2.56
Registered electors		18,457		
UDC gain from BDP		Swing	+12.86	

=== 2019 election ===
General election 2019: Kgalagadi South
Party	Candidate	Votes	%	±%
BDP	Sam Brooks	7,873	52.23	−2.68
UDC	Micus Chimbombi	6,498	43.11	+2.83
Independent	John Toto	702	4.66	N/A
Margin of victory		1,375	9.12	−5.51
Total valid votes		15,073	99.22	+0.39
Rejected ballots		119	0.78	−0.39
Turnout		15,192	89.41	+1.19
Registered electors		16,992		
BDP hold		Swing	−2.76	

=== 2014 election ===
General election 2014: Kgalagadi South
Party	Candidate	Votes	%	±%
BDP	Frans van der Westhuizen	6,824	54.91	+5.71
UDC	John Toto	5,006	40.28	−10.52
BCP	Richard White	456	3.67	N/A
Independent	Iven McKenzie	141	1.13	N/A
Margin of victory		1,818	14.63	N/A
Total valid votes		12,427	98.83	+0.38
Rejected ballots		147	1.17	−0.38
Turnout		12,574	88.22	+6.74
Registered electors		14,2253		
BDP gain from UDC		Swing	+8.16	

Note: UDC vote share is compared to the vote share of the BNF in 2009.

=== 2009 election ===
General election 2009: Kgalagadi South
Party	Candidate	Votes	%	±%
BNF	John Toto	4,595	50.80	+7.21
BDP	Neo Moroka	4,451	49.20	−7.21
Margin of victory		144	1.60	N/A
Total valid votes		9,046	98.45	+0.09
Rejected ballots		142	1.55	−0.09
Turnout		9,188	81.48	−1.72
Registered electors		11,276		
BNF gain from BDP		Swing	+7.21	

=== 2004 election ===
General election 2004: Kgalagadi South
Party	Candidate	Votes	%
BDP	Neo Moroka	4,398	56.41
BNF	John Toto	3,398	43.59
Margin of victory		1,000	12.83
Total valid votes		7,796	98.36
Rejected ballots		130	1.64
Turnout		7,926	83.20
Registered electors		9,526	
BDP win (new seat)			
