= List of airports in Botswana =

This is a list of airports in Botswana, sorted by location.

Note: Only airports with an ICAO airport code and/or IATA airport code have been included. Airport names shown in bold indicate the airport has scheduled service on commercial airlines.

== Airports ==
Airport name	City served	District	ICAO	IATA	Coordinates	Type of airport
Civil airports
**P.G. Matante International Airport**	Francistown	North-East	FBPM	FRW	21.160°S 27.475°E	International / military air base
Ghanzi Airport	Ghanzi	Ghanzi	FBGZ	GNZ	21.692°S 21.658°E	
Gumare Airport	Gumare	North-West	FBGM		19.367°S 22.167°E	
Hukuntsi Airport	Hukuntsi	Kgalagadi		HUK	23.990°S 21.758°E	
Jwaneng Airport	Jwaneng	Southern	FBJW	JWA	24.602°S 24.691°E	
Kang Airport	Kang	Kgalagadi	FBKG		23.683°S 22.817°E	
Kanye Airport	Kanye	Southern	FBKY		25.050°S 25.317°E	
**Kasane Airport**	Kasane	Chobe	FBKE	BBK	17.833°S 25.162°E	International
Khwai River Airport	Khwai	North-West	FBKR	KHW	19.150°S 23.783°E	
Machaneng Airport	Machaneng	Central	FBMG		23.183°S 27.467°E	Military airstrip
Makalamabedi Airport	Makalamabedi	North-West	FBMM		20.333°S 23.883°E	
Matsieng Air Strip	Rasesa	Kgatleng	FBMA		24.357°S 26.090°E	
**Maun Airport**	Maun	North-West	FBMN	MUB	19.973°S 23.431°E	International
Molepolole Airport - closed	Molepolole	Kweneng	FBML		24.389°S 25.499°E	Former airport
Nata Airport	Nata	Central	FBNT		20.216°S 26.159°E	
Nokaneng Airport	Nokaneng	North-West	FBNN		19.339°S 22.154°E	
Okwa Camp One Airport	Okwa	Ghanzi	FBOK		23.083°S 21.883°E	
Orapa Airport	Orapa	Central	FBOR	ORP	21.267°S 25.317°E	
Palapye Airport	Palapye	Central	FBPY	QPH	22.567°S 27.150°E	
Pandamatenga Airport	Pandamatenga	North-West	FBPA		18°31′53.0″S 25°39′7.1″E	
Savuti Airport	Savuti	North-West	FBSV	SVT	18.521°S 24.077°E	
Selebi-Phikwe Airport	Selebi-Phikwe	Central	FBSP	PKW	22°03′26″S 27°49′37″E	
Seronga Airport	Seronga	North-West	FB71		18°49′25″S 22°25′25″E	
Serowe Airport - closed	Serowe	Central	FBSR		22.423°S 26.757°E	Former airport
Shakawe Airport	Shakawe	North-West	FBSW	SWX	18.374°S 21.833°E	
**Sir Seretse Khama International Airport**	Gaborone	South-East	FBSK	GBE	24.555°S 25.918°E	International / military air base
Thebephatshwa Airport / Maparangwane Air Base	Thebephatshwa	Kweneng	FBTP		24°13′15.8″S 025°20′49.1″E	
Tshabong Airport	Tshabong	Kgalagadi	FBTS	TBY	26.033°S 22.400°E	
Tshane Airport	Tshane	Kgalagadi	FBTE		24.017°S 21.883°E	
Xaxaba Airfield	Xaxaba	North-West	FBXB		19.551°S 23.055°E	
Xugana Airport	Xugana	North-West	FBXG		19.050°S 23.090°E	
Private airports
Camp Okavango Airport	Camp Okavango	North-West	FBCO		19.117°S 23.100°E	
Lobatse Airport	Lobatse	South-East	FBLO	LOQ	25°11′22.1″S 25°40′56.2″E	
Sua Pan Airport	Sowa	Central	FBSN	SXN	20.553°S 26.116°E	
Tuli Lodge Airport	Tuli Lodge	Central	FBTL	TLD	22.183°S 29.117°E	
Xudum Airport	Xudum	North-East	FBXX		19°41′0.8″S 022°52′19.4″E	
Airports with unverified coordinates
Rakops Airport	Rakops	Central	FBRK		21.000°S 24.333°E	

== See also ==
- Transport in Botswana
- List of airports by ICAO code: F#FB - Botswana
- Wikipedia: WikiProject Aviation/Airline destination lists: Africa#Botswana
