= Botswana–South Africa border =

International border

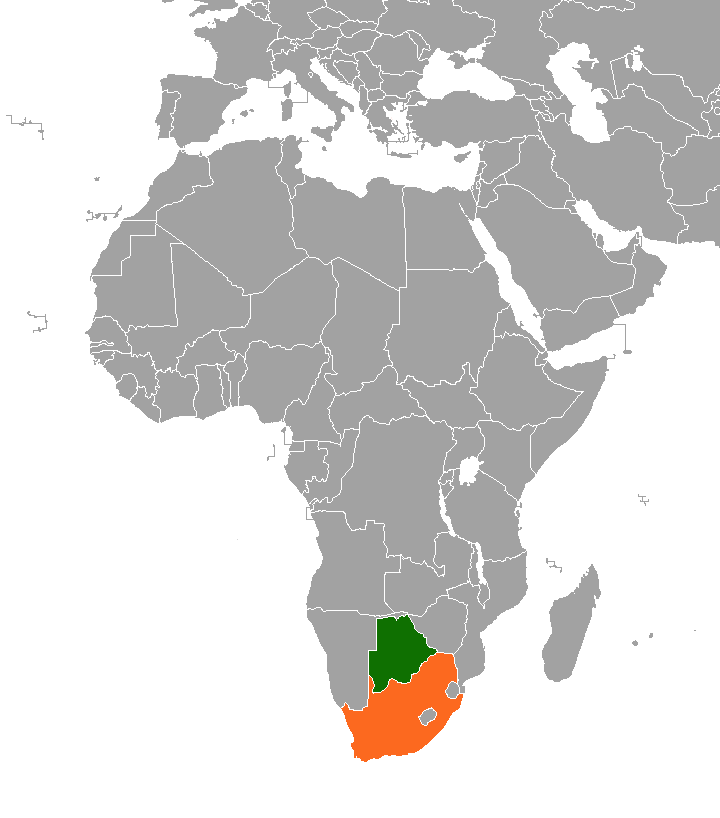
Botswana (green) and South Africa (orange)

The border between Botswana and South Africa is 1,969 kilometres (1,223 mi) long. More than 90% of the border follows rivers, including the Nossob, Molopo, Marico and Limpopo.

== Geography ==
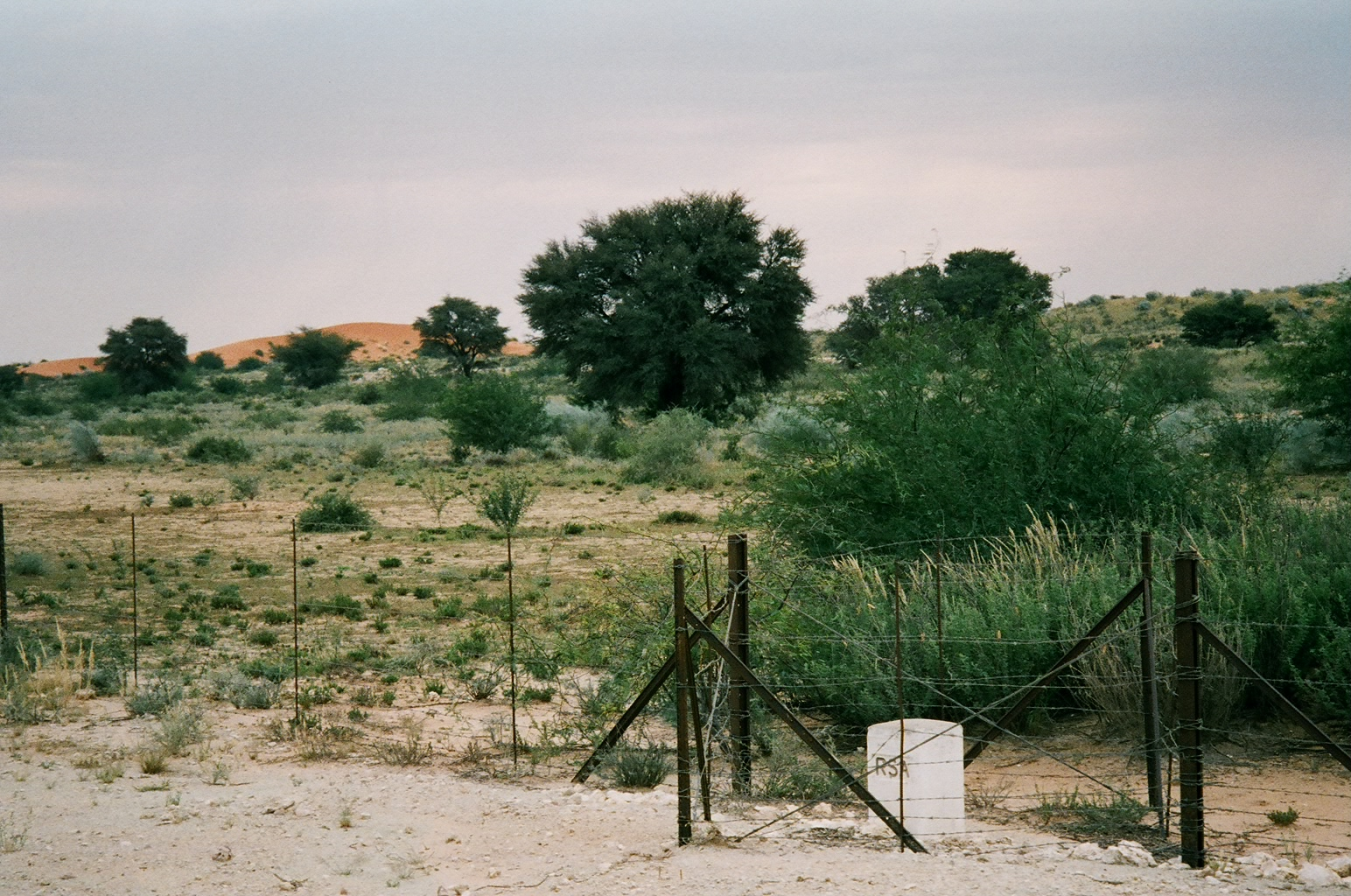
Border fence in the dry Nossob riverbed

The western terminus of the border is at the tripoint with Namibia, located where the Nossob River crosses the 20th meridian east. From this terminus the border runs south-east along the Nossob River to its confluence with the Molopo River; in this area the border passes through the Kgalagadi Transfrontier Park. From the confluence the border runs generally eastwards along the Molopo River as far as the Ramatlabama Spruit, and then up the Spruit as far as the pool at Ramatlabama.

From Ramatlabama the border turns northwards, and is made up of a series of straight lines through beacons at Matlhase, Sebataole, Schaapkuil and Pytlanganyane to Sengoma on the Ngotwane River. It then follows the Ngotwane past Ramotswa to its confluence with the Metsemaswaane Stream. The border turns eastwards along a series of straight lines joining beacons on the Moshweu Hills, Wildebeeskop and the Sikwane Hills to Derdepoort on the Marico River. It then follows the Marico River to its confluence with the Crocodile River. The Marico and the Crocodile join to form the Limpopo River, and the border runs along the Limpopo to its confluence with the Shashe River, which is the tripoint with Zimbabwe.

== History ==
The western portion of the border from the Namibian tripoint to Ramatlabama was the border between British Bechuanaland to the south and the Bechuanaland Protectorate to the north. British Bechuanaland was constituted as a Crown Colony by proclamation in 1885, and incorporated the lands of the Tswana people situated to the south of the Molopo River, west of the South African Republic (the Transvaal) and not already part of the Cape Colony. The Tswana lands north of the Molopo were at the same time brought under British protection as the Bechuanaland Protectorate. British Bechuanaland was annexed to the Cape Colony in 1895. The Order in Council authorising the annexation also extended the border northwards to include the land between the Molopo and the Nossob River, which is now the Mier area and the South African section of the Kgalagadi Transfrontier Park.

The Order in Council of 3 October 1895 defined the northern border of British Bechuanaland as

...on the north, by that [Nossob] river to its junction with the Molopo River, thence by that river to its junction with the Ramathalbana Spruit, and thence by that river to its junction with the [South African] Republic.

The eastern portion of the border from Ramatlabama to the Zimbabwean tripoint was the border between the South African Republic (ZAR) and the Bechuanaland Protectorate, and was defined by the Pretoria Convention of 1881 and the London Convention of 1884 which superseded it. These conventions settled the bounds of the ZAR, which subsisted until it was annexed to the British Empire during the Second Anglo-Boer War, becoming the Transvaal Colony. The London Convention defined the western border of the ZAR as

thence up the course of the Limpopo River to the point where the Marique [Marico] River falls into it. Thence up the course of the Marique River to "Derde Poort," where it passes through a low range of hills, called Sikwane, a beacon (No. 10) being erected on the spur of said range near to, and westward of, the banks of the river; thence, in a straight line, through this beacon to a beacon (No. 9), erected on the top of the same range, about 1,700 yards [1,600 m] distant from beacon No. 10; thence in a straight line to a beacon (No. 8) erected on the highest point of an isolated hill called Dikgagong [Dikgogone], or "Wildebeest Kop," situated south-eastward of and about 3 1/3 miles [5.4 km] distant from a high hill, called Moripe [Modipe]; thence in a straight line to a beacon (No. 7) erected on the summit of an isolated hill or "koppie" forming the eastern extremity of the range of hills called Moshweu, situated to the northward of and about two miles [3 km] distant from a large isolated hill called Chukudu-Chochwa [Tshukudutshojwe]; thence, in a straight line, to a beacon (No. 6) erected on the summit of a hill forming part of the same range, Moshweu; thence, in a straight line, to a beacon (No. 5) erected on the summit of a pointed hill in the same range; thence, in a straight line, to a beacon (No. 4) erected on the summit of the western extremity of the same range; thence, in a straight line, to a beacon (No. 3) erected on the summit of the northern extremity of a low, bushy hill, or "koppie," near to and eastward of the Notwane River; thence, in a straight line, to the junction of the stream called Metsi-Mashwane [Metsemaswaane] with the Notwane River (No. 2); thence up the course of the Notwane River to Sengoma, being the Poort where the river passes through the Dwarsberg Range; thence, as described in the Award given by Lieutenant-Governor Keate, dated 17 October 1871, by Pitlanganyane [Pytlaganyane] (narrow place), Deboaganka or Schaapkuil, Sibatoul [Sebataole] (bare place), and Maclase [Matlhase] to Ramatlabama, a pool on a spruit north of the Molopo River.

== Crossings ==
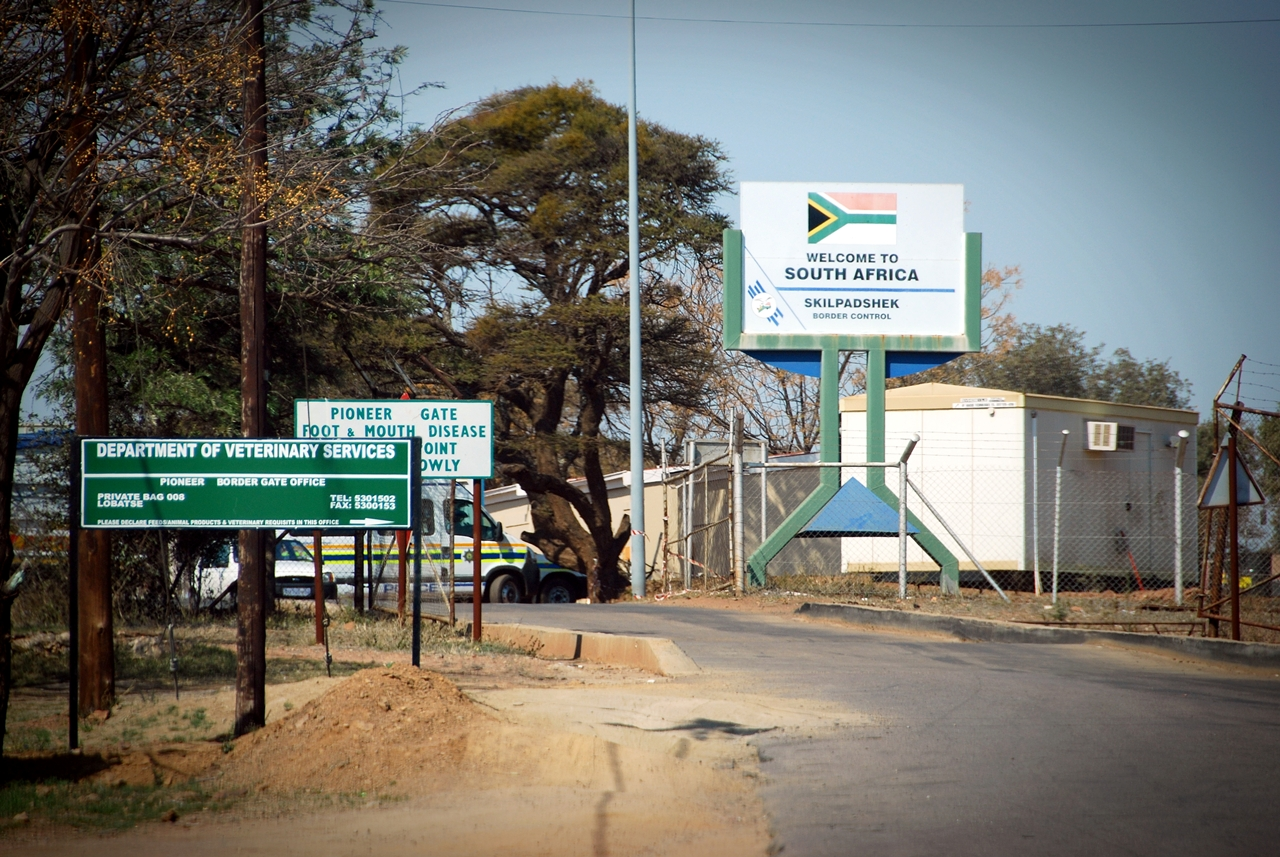
Skilpadshek/Pioneer Gate border checkpoint

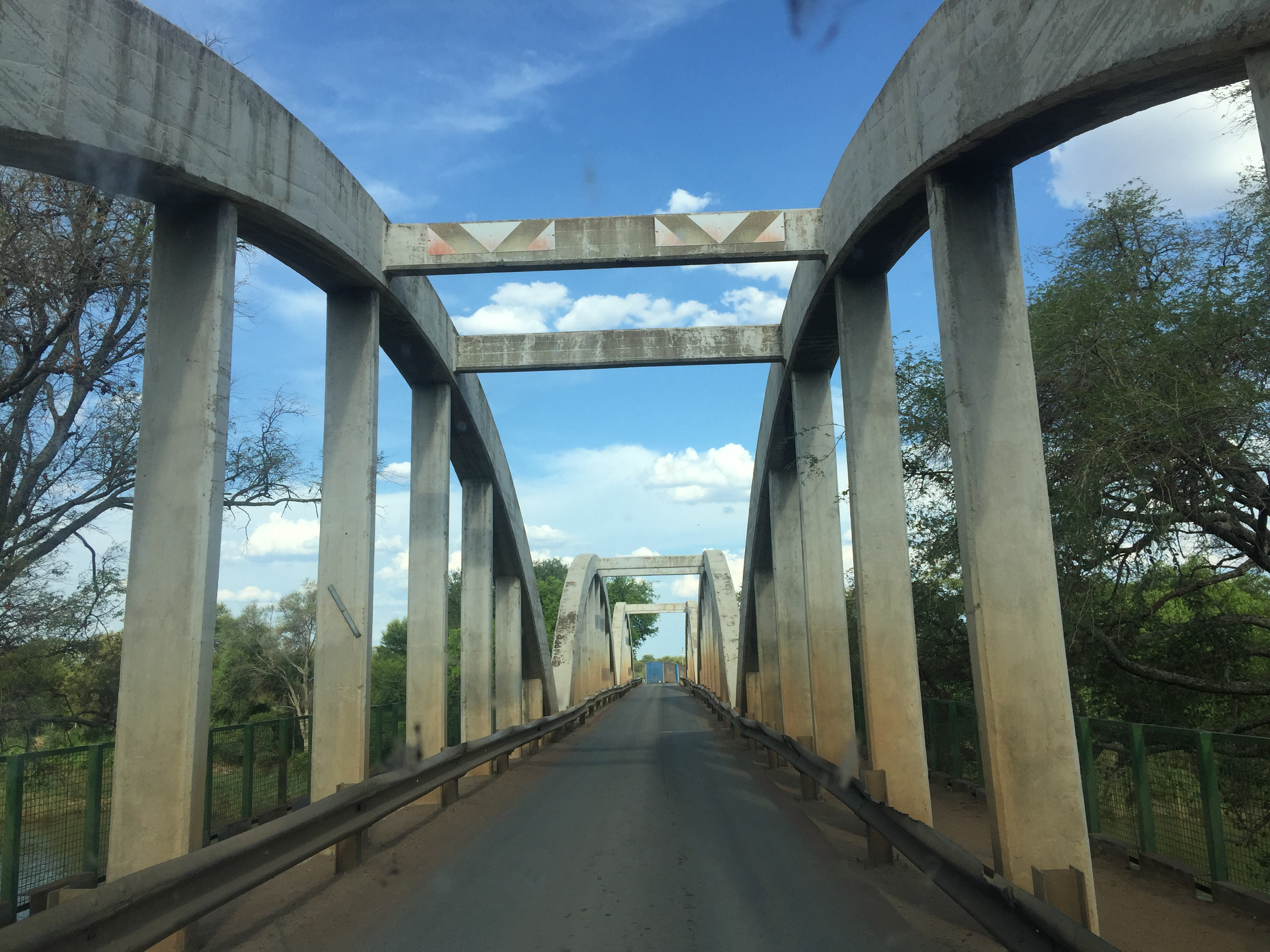
Crossing at Martin's Drift

The border has a large number of official crossings, the most important of which are Skilpadshek/Pioneer Gate on the Trans-Kalahari Corridor and Ramatlabama on the road and railway from Mahikeng to Gaborone. The crossings are listed from west to east in the table below.

Botswana		South Africa		Opening hours	Notes	Geographical coordinates
Road	Border post	Road	Border post	Opening hours	Notes	Geographical coordinates
	Twee Rivieren	R360	Twee Rivieren	07:30–16:00	Crossing in the Kgalagadi Transfrontier Park; tourist use only.	26.4701°S 20.6156°E
	Middlepits		Middelputs	07:30–16:00		26.6705°S 21.8826°E
B210	McCarthy's Rest	R380	McCarthy's Rest	06:00–18:00		26.2015°S 22.5679°E
A20	Makopong	R375	Makopong	08:00–16:00		25.3653°S 22.9747°E
	Bray	R375	Bray	07:00–16:00		25.4566°S 23.7141°E
A1	Ramatlabama	N18	Ramatlabama	06:00–22:00	Main line of Botswana Railways also crosses the border here.	25.6419°S 25.5742°E
A2	Pioneer Gate	N4	Skilpadshek	06:00–00:00	Trans-Kalahari Corridor	25.2756°S 25.7138°E
A11	Ramotswa		Swartkopfontein	06:00–22:00		24.8725°S 25.8826°E
A12	Tlokweng	R49	Kopfontein	06:00–24:00		24.7064°S 26.0939°E
	Sikwane		Derdepoort	06:00–19:00		24.6426°S 26.4035°E
B145	Parr's Halt	R572	Stockpoort	05:00–18:00		23.4027°S 27.3567°E
B140	Martin's Drift	N11	Groblersbrug	06:00–22:00		22.9981°S 27.9419°E
	Zanzibar	R561	Zanzibar	08:00–16:00	Temp. closed – Impassable when the Limpopo is in flood.	22.5719°S 28.4663°E
	Platjan		Platjan	08:00–16:00	Impassable when the Limpopo is in flood.	22.4855°S 28.8337°E
	Pontdrif	R521	Pontdrif	08:00–16:00	Impassable to vehicles when the Limpopo is in flood; a cable car carries pedestrians.	22.2148°S 29.1382°E
