= Maker =

Maker(s) or The Maker(s) may refer to:

== Film and television ==
- The Maker (film), a 1997 American drama film
- Maker Studios, now part of Disney Digital Network, an American multi-channel TV network
- Makers, a 2014 British documentary series on Channel 4 written by Pete Williams
- Makers: Women Who Make America, a 2013 American TV documentary, a 2014 TV series, and related media

== Literature ==
- Maker (character), a Marvel Comics superhero turned supervillain
- The Maker (book), or Dreamtigers, a 1960 collection by Jorge Luis Borges
- Makers (novel), a 2009 novel by Cory Doctorow
- Makers: The New Industrial Revolution, a 2012 book by Chris Anderson
- Maker Media, publisher of Make magazine and the 2006 book Makers

== Music ==
=== Bands ===
- The Makers (American band), a garage rock/rock-n-roll band formed in 1991
- The Makers (Australian band), a rock group formed in 1988

=== Albums ===
- The Maker (Chris August album) or the title song, 2015
- The Maker (Pat Martino album), 1994
- Makers (album), by Rocky Votolato, or the title song, 2006

=== Songs ===
- "Maker", a song by the Hollies from Butterfly, 1967
- "Maker", a song by Terror Jr from Unfortunately, Terror Jr, 2019
- "The Maker", a song by Daniel Lanois from Acadie, 1989
- "The Maker", a song by Martha Wainwright from Martha Wainwright, 2005

== Other uses ==
- Maker (surname), a list of people with the name
- Maker, Cornwall, a village in England
- Maker culture, a contemporary subculture
- Super Mario Maker, a 2015 side-scrolling platform game
- T/Maker, a personal computer software company
- The Maker (hotel), a hotel in Hudson, New York
- Artisan

== See also ==
- Makar (disambiguation)
- Make (disambiguation)
- Creator deity
