= Phuduhudu =

Phuduhudu may refer to:

- Phuduhudu, a village in North-West District, Botswana
- Phuduhudu, a village in Kgalagadi District, Botswana
- the Steenbok, called Phuduhudu in the Tswana language
