= Tsabong Unified Secondary School =

School in Tsabong, Botswana

Tsabong Unified Secondary School is a school in Tsabong, Kgalagadi District, Botswana, which opened in 2016. It is the first unified secondary school in Tsabong, kgalagadi South district. It started as Tsabong Junior Secondary School and it had form one to three. Previously, students from the area had to attend senior secondary school in Kang, 400 km away.

== Construction ==
The school was constructed by the Zhongan Chinese Construction Company and cost 550 million BWP to construct. Construction was in progress during 2015, with 20 Chinese workers and 470 Batswana workers on site.

== Buildings ==
The new buildings consist of two floors: the ground floor and the first floor. The school now has a new administration block, a Multi-Purpose hall, 4 building hostels, a new dining hall and kitchen, a new design and technology lab, a new Home Economics Lab, a nultidisciplinary block, science labs, 2 tennis courts, 2 basketball courts, 2 netball courts, 1 football court, 2 volleyball courts, 1 softball court, 11 teacher accommodation buildings (4 units per building), and 3 buildings of water system toilets.

== Enrollment ==
Every year the school enrols about 400 students, 200 students each to start their Form 1 and Form 4. The school has 40 classes, a minimum of 200 students each stream. The school is capable of housing 2000 students, but for the past years it has been enrolling from 1000 to 1500 students; the number varies each year.

== Controversy ==
In 2019, staff at the school complained that they were overworked because they had to teach for both the Junior Certificate (JC) and the Botswana General Certificate of Secondary Education (BGCSE).
