= Kang Airport =

- IATA: none; ICAO: FBKG

Summary
- Location: Kang, Botswana
- Elevation AMSL: 1,073 m / 3,520 ft
- Coordinates: 23°40′40″S 22°49′05″E

Map
- Location of airport in Botswana

Runways
Direction	Length		Surface
Direction	m	ft	Surface
06/24	1,200	3,937	Asphalt
- Source: Great Circle Mapper Google Maps

Kang Airport (ICAO: FBKG) is an airport serving the village of Kang, in the Kgalagadi District of Botswana.

The Kang VOR (Ident: KGV) is located on field.

== See also ==
- Transport in Botswana
- List of airports in Botswana
