= Botswana Prison Service =

Corrections agency of Botswana

- Founded: 11 May 1979

The Botswana Prison Service (BPS) is the corrections agency of Botswana. The agency oversees imprisonment and rehabilitation of pre-trial and convicted prisoners detained in the country's prisons.

== Prisons ==
- Kanye Prison (Kanye)
- Letlhakane Prison (Letlhakane)
- Lobatse Prison (Lobatse)
- Machaneng Prison (Machaneng)
- Mahalapye Prison (Mahalapye)
- Mochudi Prison (Mochudi)
- Molepolole Prison (Molepolole)
- Selebi Phikwe Prison (Selebi-Phikwe)
- Serowe New Prison (Serowe)
- Tsabong Prison(Tsabong)
- First Offenders Prison (Gaborone)
- Boro Prison (Boro)
- Ghanzi Prison (Ghanzi)
- Moshupa Boys Prison (Moshupa)
- Gaborone Maximum Prison (Gaborone)
- Gaborone Women's Prison (Gaborone)
- Tshane Prison (Tshane)
- Francistown Prison (Francistown)
- Maun Prison (Maun)
