= Middlepits =

Coordinates: 26°39′45″S 21°53′17″E

Location of Middlepits

Middlepits is a village in Kgalagadi District of Botswana. It borders South Africa and has an immigration border post. Middlepits is located in the Kgalagadi desert. The land is flat and sandy and large calcium stones are found underneath the sand. As wind erosion persists these stones are becoming more visible. They often interfere with projects such as pit latrine construction. The climate in Middlepits tends to be very dry, even during the wet season, which makes growing food crops quite difficult.

== Wards ==
Middlepits is divided into three wards which are: 1. Lesedi Ward 2. Moshetlhogo Ward 3. Manyamu Ward

== Culture ==
The majority of people in Middlepits speak Setswana. Afrikaans is also spoken as a first language by some. English is commonly understood as well.

== Economy ==
There are several businesses located in Middlepits. There are two bars, two general dealers, a bakery and multiple tuck shops. Many of the people living in Middlepits, however, are unemployed.

== Education ==
Middlepits has two schools. Middlepits Primary School teaches children from standard one to seven. Kgolagano Community Junior Secondary School teaches from forms one to three. Up to seventy percent of the students at Kgolagano CJSS school are boarders. Many of the boarding students come from the Boravast area (Bokspits and surrounding villages). Students who are accepted to senior secondary school typically go to Matsha in Kang to continue their education.

== Demographics ==
The population was 966 in the 2022 census.

== Transportation ==
Transportation in and around Middlepits can be difficult. There is a bus that travels from Gachibana to Tshabong and back twice a day. There is also a bus that goes from Bokspits to Tshabong and back although it does not run consistently. Many people rely on hitchhiking to get to and from Tshabong. There are no taxis or combis in Middlepits.

== Recreation ==
There are two football grounds in Middlepits and basketball and tennis courts on the police compound. There is an aerobics club which meets weekly.

== Public Services ==
There is a health clinic located in Middplepits and in addition to serving this village, it also overlooks the health posts of five neighboring villages (Khuis, Khawa, Kolokwaneng, Bogogobo, and Gachibana). The clinic distributes ARVs once a week. There is also a social and community development office. The post office has an internet café which can be used for a small hourly fee. There is a small library trailer in Middlepits.
