= Basadi Seipone III =

Kgosi Basadi Seipone III is the traditional leader of the village Kang in the Kgalagadi District of Botswana. She ascended the throne after the death of her father, Kgosi Church Seipone II, who after a 38-year rule died in 2010. She was installed in 2014 after a prolonged chieftaincy dispute between the Seipone and Motaung families. Kgosi Basadi Seipone III is the second woman to be installed as a chief in Botswana.

Kgosi Basadi Seipone III is one of the several women traditional leaders whose leadership is being studied under a University of Ghana project titled "Women and Political Participation in Africa: A Comparative Study of Representation and Role of Female Chiefs", which is funded by the Andrew W. Mellon Foundation. In this project, a mixed-methods approach is adopted to comparatively study women's representation in the institution of chieftaincy and their influence on women's rights and wellbeing in Botswana, Ghana, Liberia, and South Africa. Lead researchers on the project, Peace A. Medie, Adriana A. E Biney, Amanda Coffie and Cori Wielenga, have also published an opinion piece titled "Women traditional leaders could help make sure the pandemic message is heard" in The Conversation news, which discusses how women traditional leaders can educate their subjects on COVID-19.
