= SVT =

SVT may refer to:

== Medicine ==
- Superficial vein thrombosis, a type of problematic blood clot
- Supraventricular tachycardia, an abnormal heart condition

== Music ==
- SVT (band), an early-1980s American rock band
- Seventeen (South Korean band), sometimes abbreviated as SVT

== Organisations ==
- Soqosoqo ni Vakavulewa ni Taukei or the Fijian Political Party
- Special Vehicle Team, division of the Ford Motor Company
- Sudbury Valley Trustees, a regional land trust in eastern Massachusetts
- Sveriges Television, public broadcaster in Sweden
  - SVT1, main TV channel
  - SVT2, specialist TV channel
- Subtle Vandalism Taskforce, an anti-vandalism group within Wikipedia

== Technology ==
- S-VT, sequential valve timing
- Ampeg SVT, a super valve technology amplifier
- SVT-40, Samozaryadnaya Vintovka Tokareva, a WW2 semi-automatic rifle

== Transport ==
- DRG Class SVT 877 and DRG Class SVT 137, series of streamlined diesel trainsets of the former Deutsche Reichsbahn-Gesellschaft
- Sturtevant (Amtrak station)'s train station code
- Savuti Airport's IATA code

== Other uses ==
- Superfluid vacuum theory
