= Hukuntsi Airport =

Airport in Kgalagadi, Botswana

- IATA: HUK; ICAO: none; LID: BW-HUK

Summary
- Serves: Hukuntsi, Botswana
- Elevation AMSL: 3,720 ft / 1,134 m
- Coordinates: 23°59′20″S 21°45′30″E

Map
- Location of airport in Botswana

Runways
Direction	Length		Surface
Direction	m	ft	Surface
04/22	1,240	4,068	Dirt
- Source: GCM Google Maps

Hukuntsi Airport (IATA: HUK) is an airport serving the village of Hukuntsi in the Kgalagadi District of Botswana. The runway is 2.5 kilometres (1.6 mi) west of the village, near a large salt pan.

== See also ==
- Transport in Botswana
- List of airports in Botswana
