= B. K. Taoana =

Mosotho writer and playwright

B. K. Taoana was a Mosotho writer and playwright known for his contribution to Sesotho literature and drama during the mid-20th century. He is best known for his plays Obe (1957) and Moshoeshoe (1981), works that draw on Basotho folklore and history. His writing forms part of the broader development of written drama in the Sesotho language.

== Life and career ==
Taoana was active during the mid-20th century and wrote mostly in Sesotho, contributing to the growth of published drama in Southern Sotho literature. His work reflects the transition from oral storytelling traditions (ditshomo) to written dramatic literature. Taoana was among a generation of writers who helped formalize Sesotho drama in print and educational contexts.

== Works ==
=== Obe (1957) ===
Obe is a Southern Sotho drama first published in 1957. The play is based on a folktale and incorporates themes of witchcraft, secrecy, morality, and social discipline within Basotho society. The narrative centers on Obe, a character drawn from oral tradition, and explores tensions between family members after allegations of witchcraft are revealed. In the drama, a character named Seipati is disciplined by her mother-in-law after disclosing the latter's alleged witchcraft, illustrating tensions around secrecy, power, and communal values.

The work was later republished in South Africa and is listed in theater and literary bibliographies of Southern African drama.

=== Moshoeshoe (1981) ===
Moshoeshoe is a historical dialogue play published by Mazenod Book Centre in 1981. The drama portrays the life and leadership of Moshoeshoe I, founder of the Basotho nation.

The play dramatizes key moments in Moshoeshoe's leadership, including the unification of clans and responses to regional conflict and early colonial pressures. It forms part of a tradition of historical plays in Sesotho literature that celebrate national heritage.

== Literary context ==
Taoana is often mentioned alongside other contributors to Sesotho drama, such as B. M. Khaketla and J. J. Moiloa, who similarly integrated oral sources with written theatrical form.

== Selected bibliography ==
- Taoana, B. K. Obe. 1957.
- Taoana, B. K. Moshoeshoe. Mazenod Book Centre, 1981.
