= FBMA =

FBMA may refer to:

- Fernandina Beach Municipal Airport, Florida, US
- Matsieng Air Strip, Botswana, by ICAO code
- FBMA Trophy in figure skating
