= TBY =

TBY may refer to:

- Tshabong Airport, Tsabong, Botswana
- Thornaby railway station, North Yorkshire, England
- Thornbury railway station, Melbourne
