= Make =

Make or MAKE may refer to:

- Make (magazine), a tech DIY periodical
- Make (software), a software build tool
- Make, Botswana, in the Kalahari Desert of Africa
- Make Architects, an architecture studio
- Make or marque, any car brand of the automotive industry

== See also ==
- Makemake (disambiguation)
