= Maralaleng =

Village in Botswana

Coordinates: 25°47′40″S 22°41′7″E

Location of Maralaleng

Maralaleng is a village in Kgalagadi District of Botswana. It is located east of the district capital Tsabong and has a primary school. The climate in Maraleng is considered to be a desert climate. The population is 702 according to a 2022 census.
