= Gakhibane =

Village in Botswana

Coordinates: 26°42′56″S 21°46′15″E

Location of Gakhibane

Gakhibane (Gakeybane) is a village in Kgalagadi District of Botswana. It is located close to the border with South Africa. Gakhibane has a primary school, and the population was 746 in 2011 census. Ghakhibane is known for its road through the Molopo fossil river valley. It is located at the upper right side of the river.
