= Selebi-Phikwe Airport =

Airport in Botswana

- IATA: PKW; ICAO: FBSP

Summary
- Airport type: Public
- Operator: Government
- Serves: Selebi-Phikwe, Botswana
- Elevation AMSL: 2,925 ft (892 m)
- Coordinates: 22°03′30″S 27°49′45″E

Map
- Location of airport in Botswana

Runways
Direction	Length		Surface
Direction	m	ft	Surface
12/30	1,780	5,840	Asphalt
- Sources: CAA Botswana WAD GCM

Selebi-Phikwe Airport (IATA: PKW, ICAO: FBSP) is an airport serving Selebi-Phikwe, a town in the Central District of Botswana. Both the town and airport names are sometimes given as Selebi Phikwe.

The Selebi Phikwe non-directional beacon (Ident: SP) is located on the field.

The airport is 12 kilometres (7.5 mi) southeast of the city. It is also near the gateway of the Tuli Block area, where wildlife and resorts are popular. No scheduled services currently operate at the airport. Private and charter traffic serve the airport.

== See also ==
- Transport in Botswana
- List of airports in Botswana
