= Seronga Airport =

Airport in Botswana

- IATA: none; ICAO: FB71; LID: BW-0003

Summary
- Airport type: Public
- Serves: Seronga
- Elevation AMSL: 3,240 ft / 988 m
- Coordinates: 18°49′25″S 22°25′25″E

Map
- Location of the airport in Botswana

Runways
Direction	Length		Surface
Direction	m	ft	Surface
12/30	1,100	3,609	Gravel
- Source: Google Maps OurAirports

Seronga Airport (ICAO: FB71) is an airport serving the village of Seronga in the North-West District of Botswana. The well-marked runway is on the northern edge of the Okavango Delta.

== See also ==
- Transport in Botswana
- List of airports in Botswana
