= Maubelo =

Village in Botswana

Coordinates: 26°4′38″S 22°22′39″E

Location of Maubelo

Maubelo is a village in Kgalagadi District of Botswana. It is located south of the district capital Tsabong and has a primary school. The population was 832 in the 2022 census.
