= Xugana Airport =

Airport in Botswana

- IATA: none; ICAO: FBXG

Summary
- Airport type: Private
- Serves: Xugana Island
- Elevation AMSL: 3,100 ft / 945 m
- Coordinates: 19°03′00″S 23°05′20″E

Map
- Location of the airport in Botswana

Runways
Direction	Length		Surface
Direction	m	ft	Surface
01/19	1,050	3,445	Gravel
- Source: Google Maps GCM

Xugana Airport (ICAO: FBXG) is an airstrip serving the Xugana Island Lodge, a safari resort in the Okavango Delta of Botswana.

== See also ==
- Transport in Botswana
- List of airports in Botswana
