= Xaxaba Airfield =

Airport in Botswana

- IATA: none; ICAO: FBXB

Summary
- Airport type: Public
- Serves: Xaxaba
- Elevation AMSL: 3,140 ft / 957 m
- Coordinates: 19°33′00″S 23°3′15″E

Map
- Location of Xaxaba Airfield in Botswana

Runways
Direction	Length		Surface
Direction	m	ft	Surface
14/32	1,100	3,609	Sand
- Sources: Landings.com Google Maps GCM

Xaxaba Airfield (ICAO: FBXB) is an airstrip 3.5 kilometres (2.2 mi) west of Xaxaba, a village in the Okavango Delta of Botswana. It serves several safari camps in the area. The runway is just outside the Moremi Game Reserve.

== See also ==
- Transport in Botswana
- List of airports in Botswana
