= Inalegolo =

Coordinates: 23°57′3″S 22°58′30″E

Location of Inalegolo

Inalegolo is a village in Kgalagadi District of Botswana. It is located in the north-east part of the district, in Kalahari Desert, it has a primary school and a health post. The population was 853 in the 2022 census. The chief of the village is Kgosi Keamogetse Ghubi.
