= Lobatse Airport =

Airport in Botswana

- IATA: LOQ; ICAO: FBLO

Summary
- Serves: Lobatse, Botswana
- Elevation AMSL: 3,823 ft (1,165 m)
- Coordinates: 25°11′50″S 25°42′52″E

Map
- Location of airport in Botswana

Runways
Direction	Length		Surface
Direction	m	ft	Surface
05/23	1,170	3,839	Dirt
- Source: GCM

Lobatse Airport (IATA: LOQ, ICAO: FBLO) is an airstrip serving Lobatse, a town in the South-East District of Botswana. The runway is 2 kilometres (1.2 mi) east of the town, and 3.2 kilometres (2 mi) west of the border with South Africa. There is a ridge between the town and airstrip that parallels the runway.

The Gaborone VOR-DME (Ident: GBV) is located 36.6 nautical miles (67.8 km) north of the airport.

== See also ==
- Transport in Botswana
- List of airports in Botswana
