= Maleshe =

Coordinates: 25°52′29″S 22°20′51″E

Location of Maleshe

Maleshe is a village in Kgalagadi District of Botswana. It is located close the capital of the district, Tshabong, and it has a primary school. The population was 494 in the 2022 census. Maleshe also has a clinic, small business tuckshops and retailers.
