= Sam Brooks (politician) =

Botswana politician

Member of Parliament for Kgalagadi South
- In office 2019–2024
- Preceded by: Frans van der Westhuizen
- Succeeded by: Micus Chimbombi

Personal details
- Party: Botswana Democratic Party

Sam J. Brooks is a politician from Botswana. He was elected the Member of Parliament for Kgalagadi South for the Botswana Democratic Party in the 2019 Botswana general election.

In the 2024 Botswana general election for parliament, Brooks was defeated in a primary election.
