= Phepheng =

Coordinates: 25°28′27″S 22°51′20″E

Location of Phepheng

Phepheng, also known as Phepeng, Draaihoek or Draihoek, is a village in Kgalagadi District of Botswana. It is located north-east of the district capital Tshabong. The population was 1,411 in the 2022 census.
