= Khisa =

Village in Botswana

Coordinates: 25°39′43″S 22°49′15″E

Location of Khisa

Khisa or Kisa is a village in Kgalagadi District of Botswana. It is located close to the border with South Africa, north-east of the district capital Tshabong. The population was 433 in the 2022 census.
