= Orapa Airport =

- IATA: ORP; ICAO: FBOR

Summary
- Airport type: Public
- Owner: Debswana
- Location: Orapa, Botswana
- Elevation AMSL: 3,100 ft / 945 m
- Coordinates: 21°16′00″S 25°19′05″E

Map
- Location of airport in Botswana

Runways
Direction	Length		Surface
Direction	m	ft	Surface
07/25	1,675	5,495	Asphalt
- Source: SkyVector GCM

Orapa Airport (IATA: ORP, ICAO: FBOR) is an airport serving Orapa, a town in the Central District of Botswana. It is owned by Debswana, which also owns the Orapa diamond mine.

There is no scheduled airline service. Landing permission must be obtained from Debswana at least 48 hours prior to arrival. Orapa is an airport of entry and departure for common customs only. Immigration should handled through Botswana's international airports.

The Orapa non-directional beacon (Ident: OR) is located on the field.

== See also ==
- Transport in Botswana
- List of airports in Botswana
