= Molepolole Airport =

Airport in Botswana

- IATA: none; ICAO: FBML

Summary
- Airport type: Closed
- Serves: Molepolole, Botswana
- Elevation AMSL: 3,790 ft (1,160 m)
- Coordinates: 24°23′22″S 25°29′55″E

Map
- Location of Molepolole Airport in Botswana

Runways
Direction	Length		Surface
Direction	ft	m	Surface
Closed
- Source: Landings.com Google Maps

Molepolole Airport (ICAO: FBML) was an airport serving Molepolole, Botswana.

Google Earth Historical Imagery (September 2002) shows a 1,125 metres (3,691 ft) dirt runway. Current Google Maps imagery shows the runway overbuilt with buildings and a large parking area.

Other airports in the area include Thebephatshwa Airport, 22 kilometres (14 mi) northwest, and Sir Seretse Khama International Airport, 44 kilometres (27 mi) southeast, by Gaborone.

== See also ==
- Transport in Botswana
- List of airports in Botswana
