= Moroka =

Moroka may refer to:

== People ==
- James Moroka, South African doctor and politician
- Neo Moroka, Botswanan businessman and politician

== Places ==
- Moroka River, river in Victoria, Australia
- Moroka, Victoria, locality in the Shire of Wellington, Victoria, Australia
- Moroka, Botswana, town in the North-East District, Botswana

== See also ==
- Dr JS Moroka Local Municipality, municipality in Mpumalanga Province, South Africa
- Grevillea miqueliana subsp. moroka, subspecies of the flowering plant species Grevillea miqueliana
- Maria Moroka Nature Reserve, nature reserve in Free State Province, South Africa
- Moroka Swallows F.C., former South African football club
