= Khawa, Botswana =

Coordinates: 26°16′51″S 21°22′2″E

Location of Khawa in Botswana

Khawa is a village in Kgalagadi District of Botswana. It is located in the southern part of the district and has a primary school. It has a Christian church and a primitive clinic. The annual Khawa desert challenge is held here. The people speak Setswana as well as Afrikaans, English is understood. The vegetation in and around the village is highly overgrazed and it may seem like a desert inside the village although it is located in a grassland area. All the roads in and around the village are dirtroads. The population was 1,299 in the 2022 census.
