= Xudum Airport =

- IATA: none; ICAO: FBXX

Summary
- Airport type: Private
- Elevation AMSL: 3,140 ft (960 m)
- Coordinates: 19°40′45″S 22°52′05″E

Map
- Location of Xudum Airport in Botswana

Runways
Direction	Length		Surface
Direction	m	ft	Surface
15/33	1,065	3,494	Sand/grass
- Source: Landings.com Google Maps GCM

Xudum Airport (ICAO: FBXX) is a private airstrip that serves the Xudum Okavango Delta Lodge, a wildlife safari camp in the Okavango Delta of Botswana.

== See also ==
- Transport in Botswana
- List of airports in Botswana
