= Shakawe Airport =

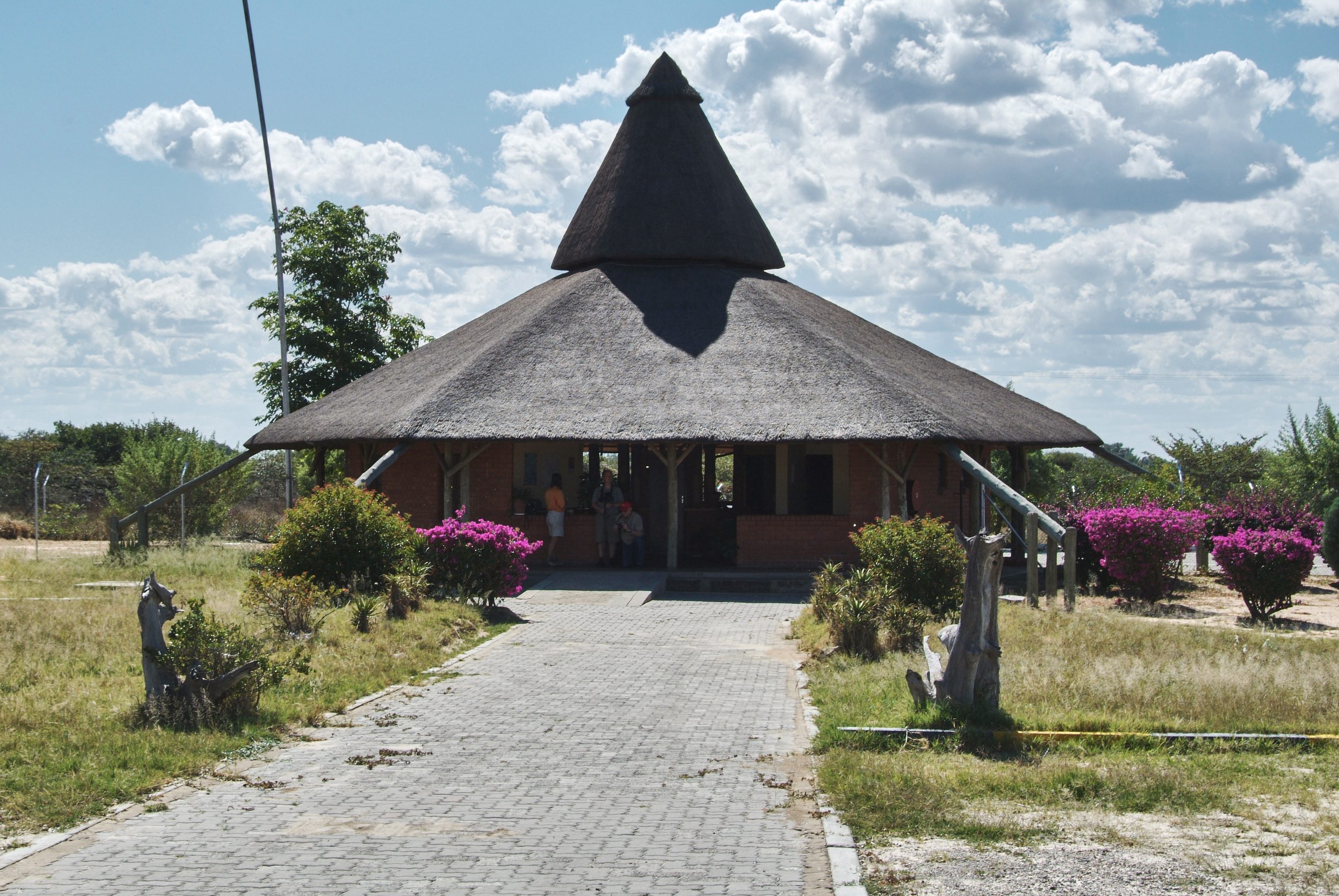
- IATA: SWX; ICAO: FBSW

Summary
- Airport type: Public
- Owner: Department of Civil Aviation
- Location: Shakawe, Botswana
- Elevation AMSL: 3,380 ft (1,030 m)
- Coordinates: 18°22′25″S 21°50′00″E
- Website: www.dca.gov.bw/...

Map
- Location of airport in Botswana

Runways
Direction	Length		Surface
Direction	m	ft	Surface
09/27	1,860	6,102	Asphalt
- Sources: CAA Botswana GCM

Shakawe Airport (IATA: SWX, ICAO: FBSW) is an airport serving Shakawe, a village in the North-West District of Botswana.

It is the gateway to the northern part of the Okavango Delta and the Linyati area. Direct charter flights are operated to the aerodrome. It is owned by the Department of Civil Aviation.

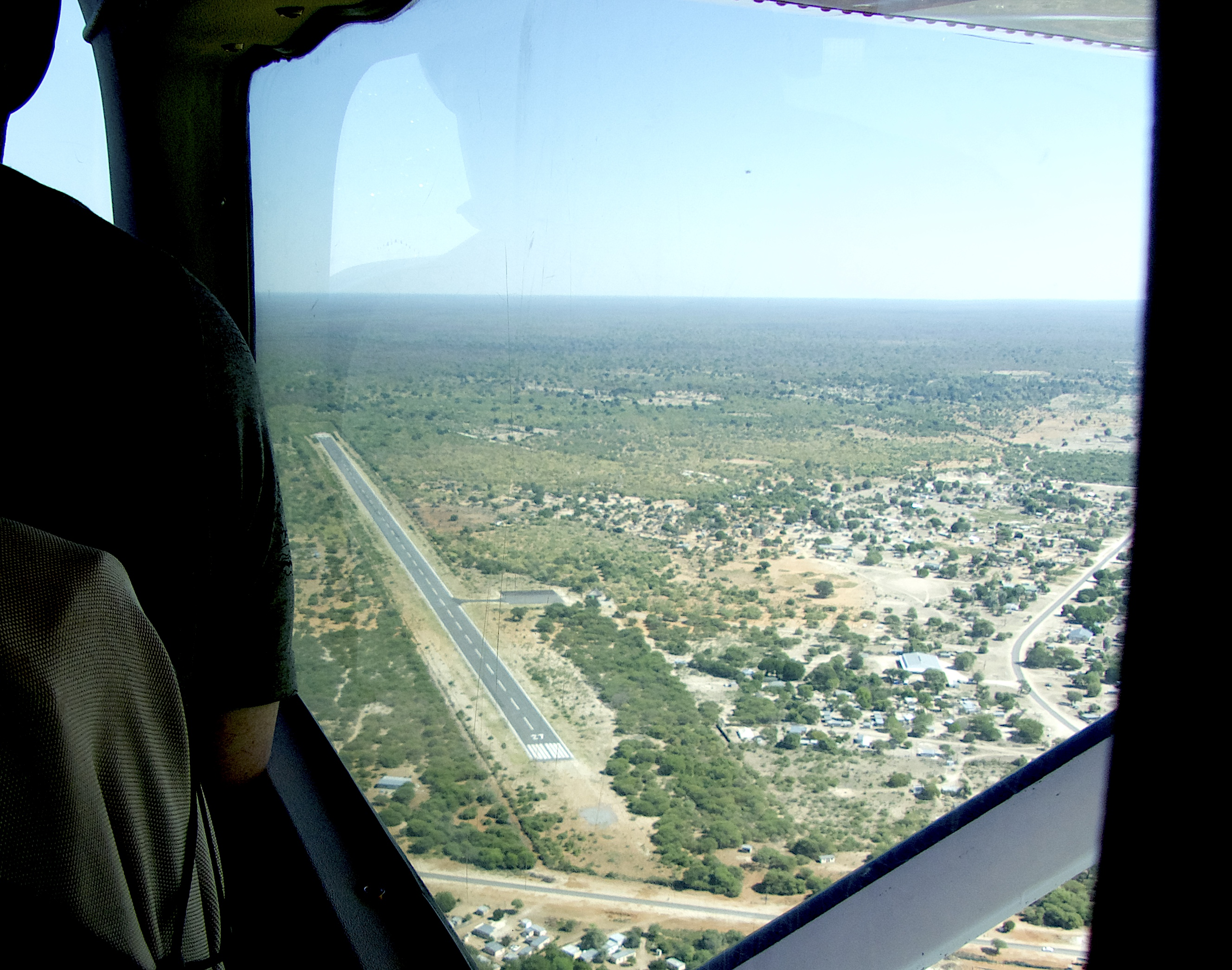
Aerial view of airport Shakawe (2019)

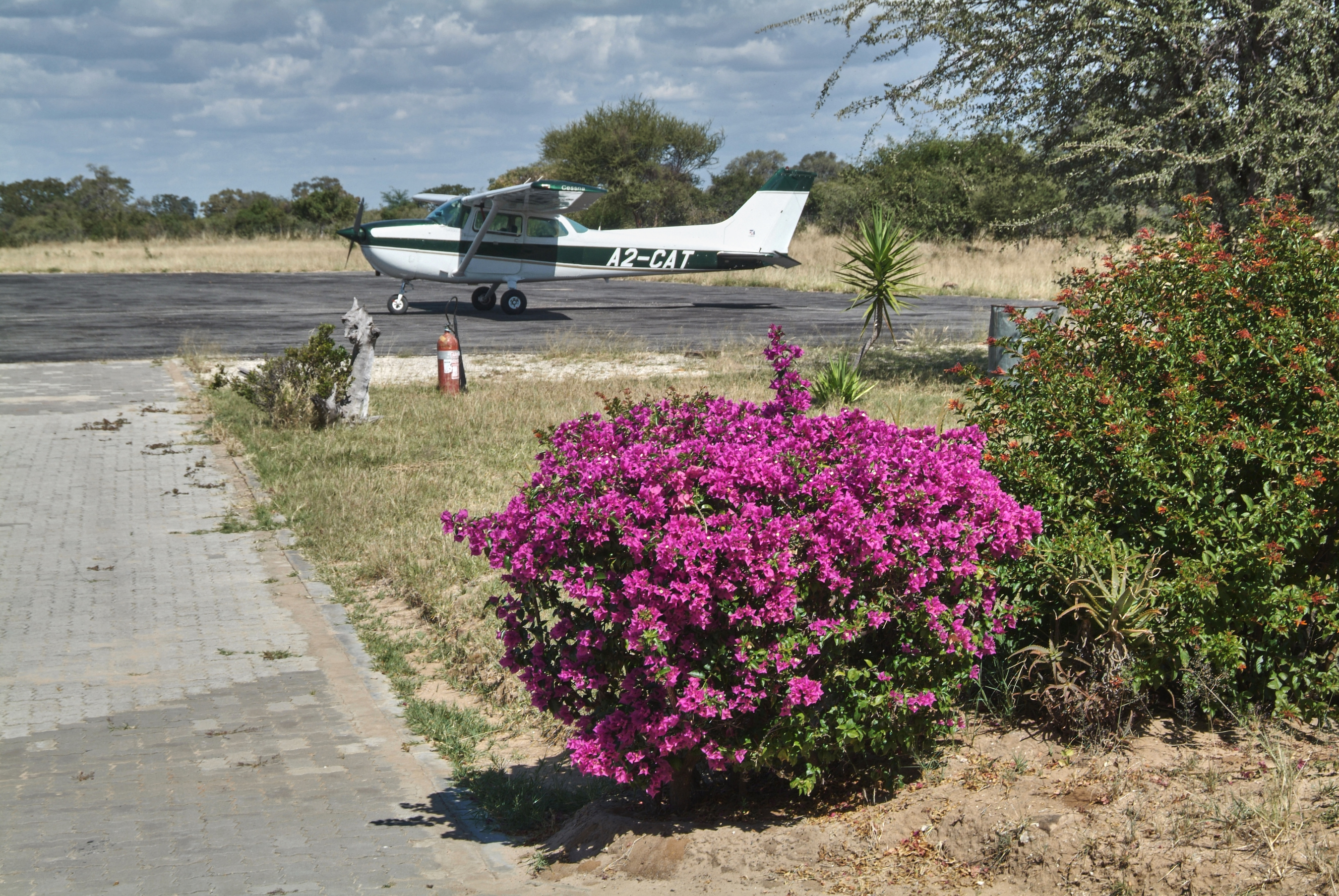
Apron

== See also ==
- Transport in Botswana
- List of airports in Botswana
