= Kokotsha =

Village in Botswana

Coordinates: 24°55′12″S 23°13′18″E

Location of Kokotsha

Kokotsha is a village in Kgalagadi District, Southern Botswana Botswana. It is located in the eastern part of the district, north of Werda. The population was 1,696 in the 2022 census.
