= James Jantjies Moiloa =

South African Sesotho-language writer and dramatist

J. J. Moiloa
- Born: James Jantjies Moiloa; 16 June 1916 (age 110); Wepener District, Free State, South Africa
- Education: University of South Africa
- Occupations: Playwright, poet, novelist, educator
- Writing career
- Notable works: Jaa, o siele motswalle, Che’– lia bua!, Molomo wa Badimo, Mosadi a ntlholla

James Jantjies Moiloa (born 16 June 1916) was a South African dramatist, poet, novelist, linguist, and educator, notable for his contributions to Sesotho literature and theater. Most of his artifacts are kept at the Sesotho Literature Museum in Bloemfontein.

== Early life and education ==
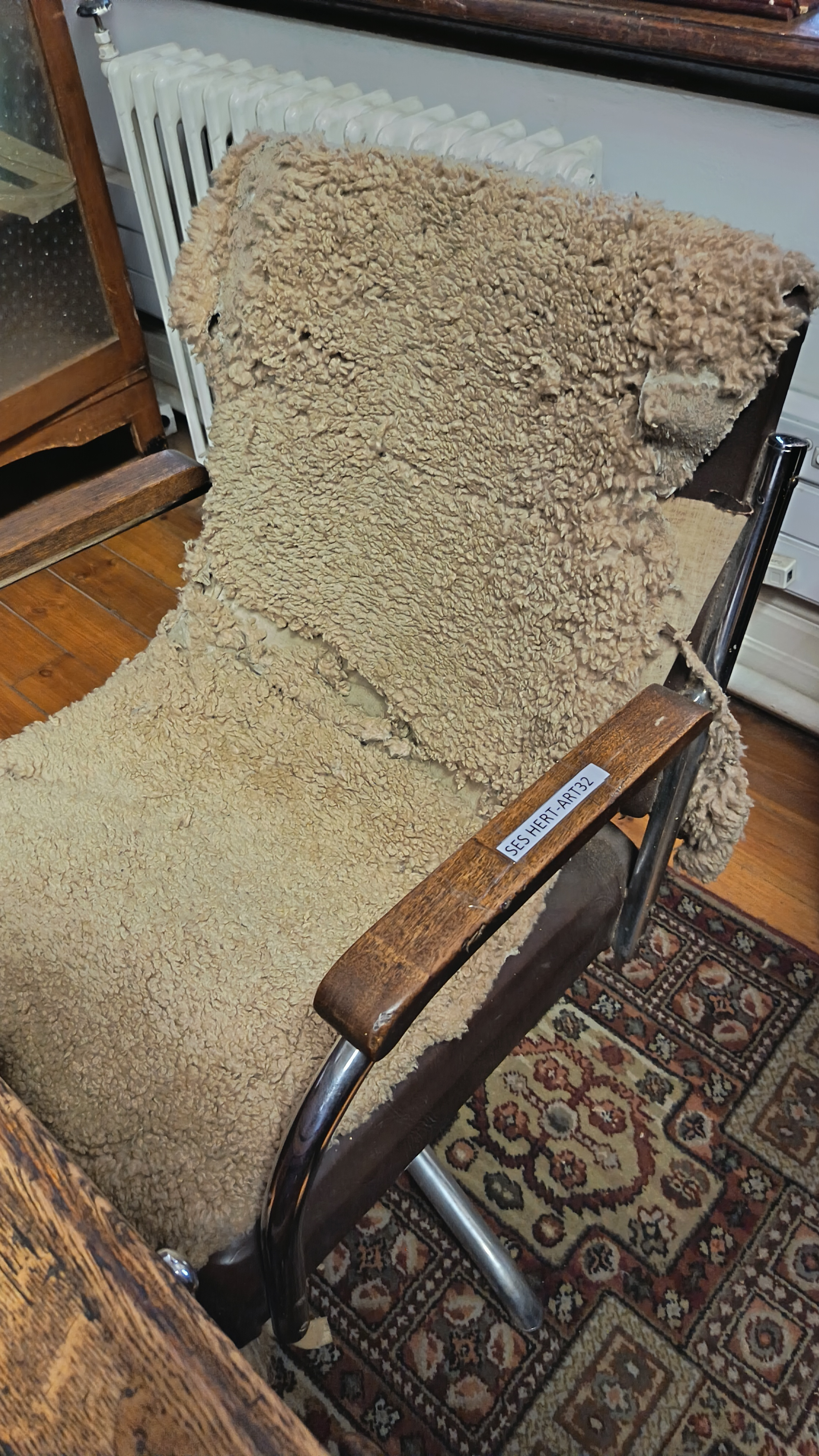
J.J Moiloa's chair next to the table he used to write on. Now part of the collection of the Sesotho Literature Museum, Dingolweng, Bloemfontein 2025.

James Jantjies Moiloa was born on 16 June 1916 in Wepener District, Free State.

He began his primary education in 1924 at Jammerdrift Primary School and later passed “Standard Four.” Despite working as a kitchen boy, he continued his studies and in 1938 passed the Junior Certificate at Bloemfontein High School.

In 1940, he completed a teacher-training course at the Moroka Missionary Institute in Thaba N'chu. From 1941 to 1951, he taught in Brandfort. In 1958, he obtained a BA degree from the University of South Africa (UNISA).

== Career ==
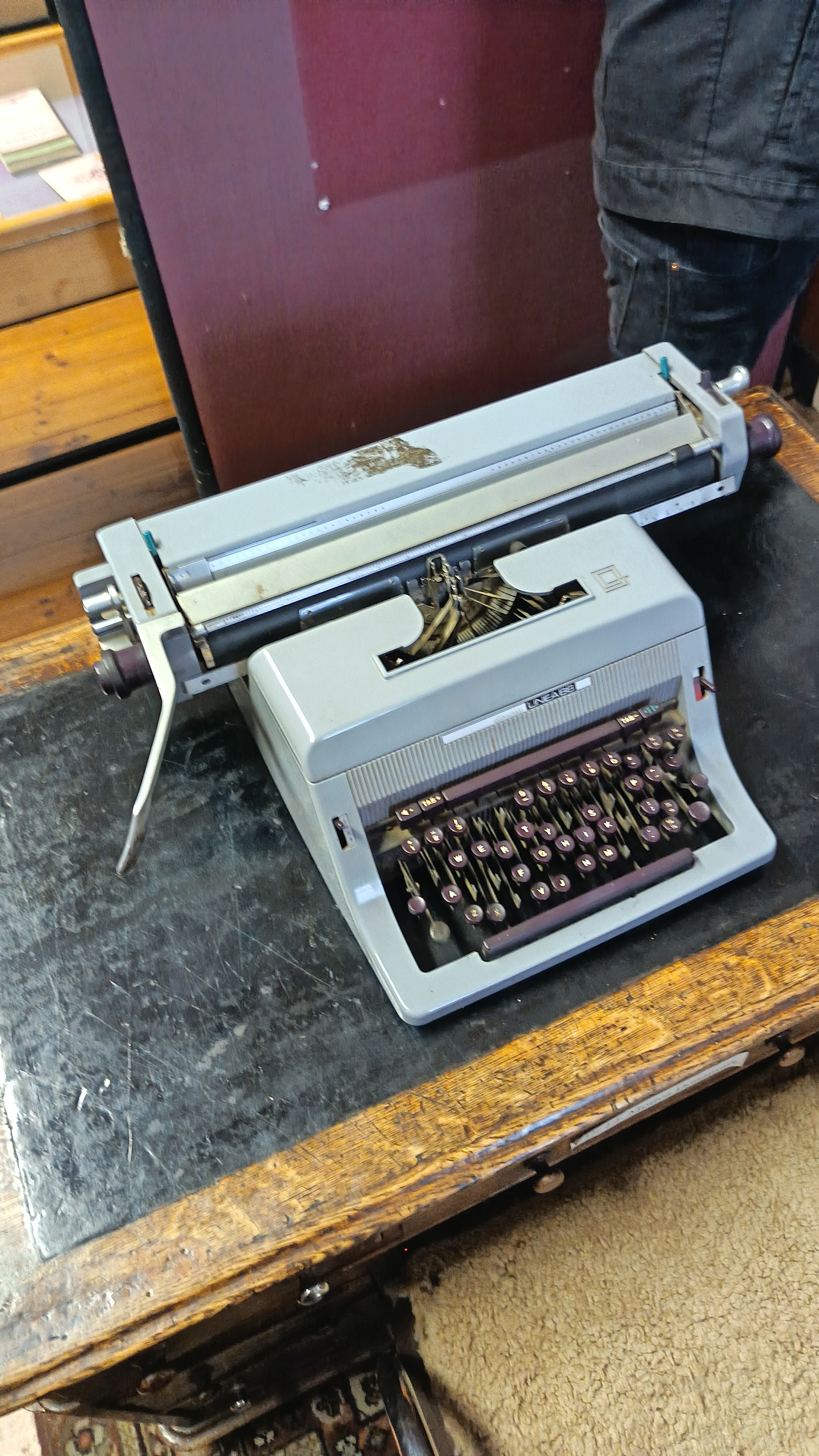
The typewriter belonging to J.J Moiloa, now a collection of Sesotho Literary Museum. 2025

Moiloa did his teachers' training at Moroka. In 1966, Moiloa was appointed as principal of Lereko Secondary School in Bloemfontein. In 1970, he became the first African to be appointed as a Sesotho-language lecturer at the then University of the Orange Free State.

== Literary and artistic work ==
J. J. Moiloa is regarded as a pioneering figure in Southern Sotho literature and drama. Through his writings and plays, Moiloa helped shape and formalize Southern Sotho literary and theatrical expression, offering narratives rooted in the culture and language of the Sesotho-speaking community.

One of his first books was published in 1969.

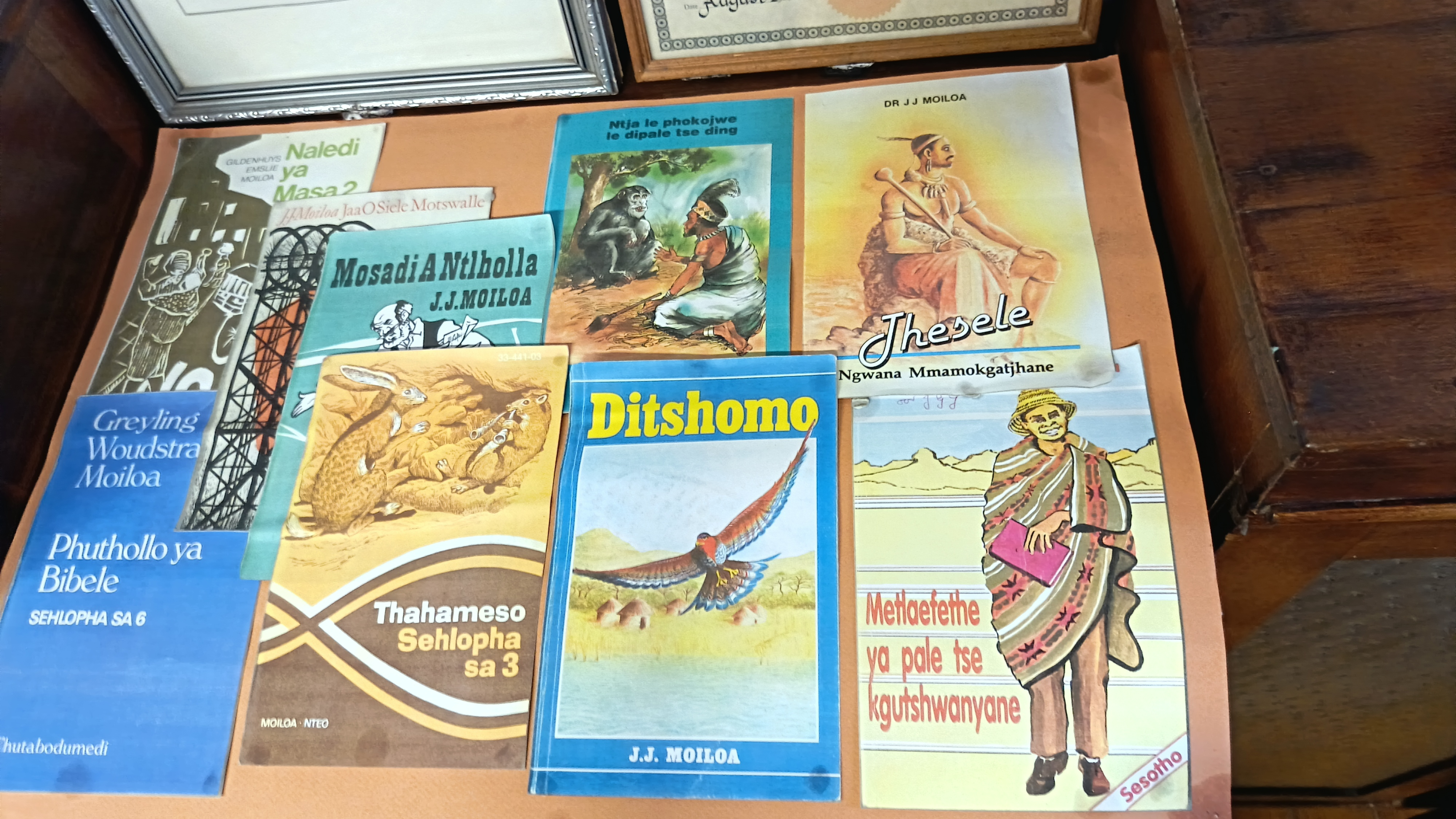
James Jantjies Moiloa's artefacts and books at the Sesotho Literary Museum collection, Bloemfontein.

=== Plays ===
- Jaa, o siele motswalle (1966) – "Yes — she has forsaken/abandoned a friend"
- Tjhe’– Dia bua! (1977) – "Gosh! They Talk!"
- Modimo wa Badimo (1977) – "The Voice of the Gods"
- Mosadi a ntlholla (1981) – "The woman surprised/disgusted me"
- Tjhee! di a bua! ...: ho llang? (1986)

=== Books / prose / poetry ===
- Sediba sa Meqoqo (1962)
- Dipale le Metlae (1963)
- Mohahlaula Dithota (1965)
- Tsietsi e latella Tshotehjo
- Monna Mosotho (1984)

== Significance and legacy ==
As an educator and writer, Moiloa contributed significantly to Sesotho language scholarship and literature, helping build a corpus of written and dramatic work in a language and cultural context that was historically marginalized. His appointment during apartheid in 1970 as the first African Sesotho lecturer at the University of the Orange Free State marked an important milestone in higher-education representation and validation of indigenous languages in South Africa.

His dramatic works remain influential in South African theatre and academic settings: his plays are studied for structure, language, cultural themes, and character development. He was founder and member of several organizations, like the Language and Culture in the homeland of Qwaqwa and the African Library Association of Southern Africa."

Dr JJ Moiloa Floating Trophy for Best Sesotho Poetry Book of the Year is named in his honor. Between 2005 and 2007 Moiloa was honoured with the South African Literary Awards for his work.

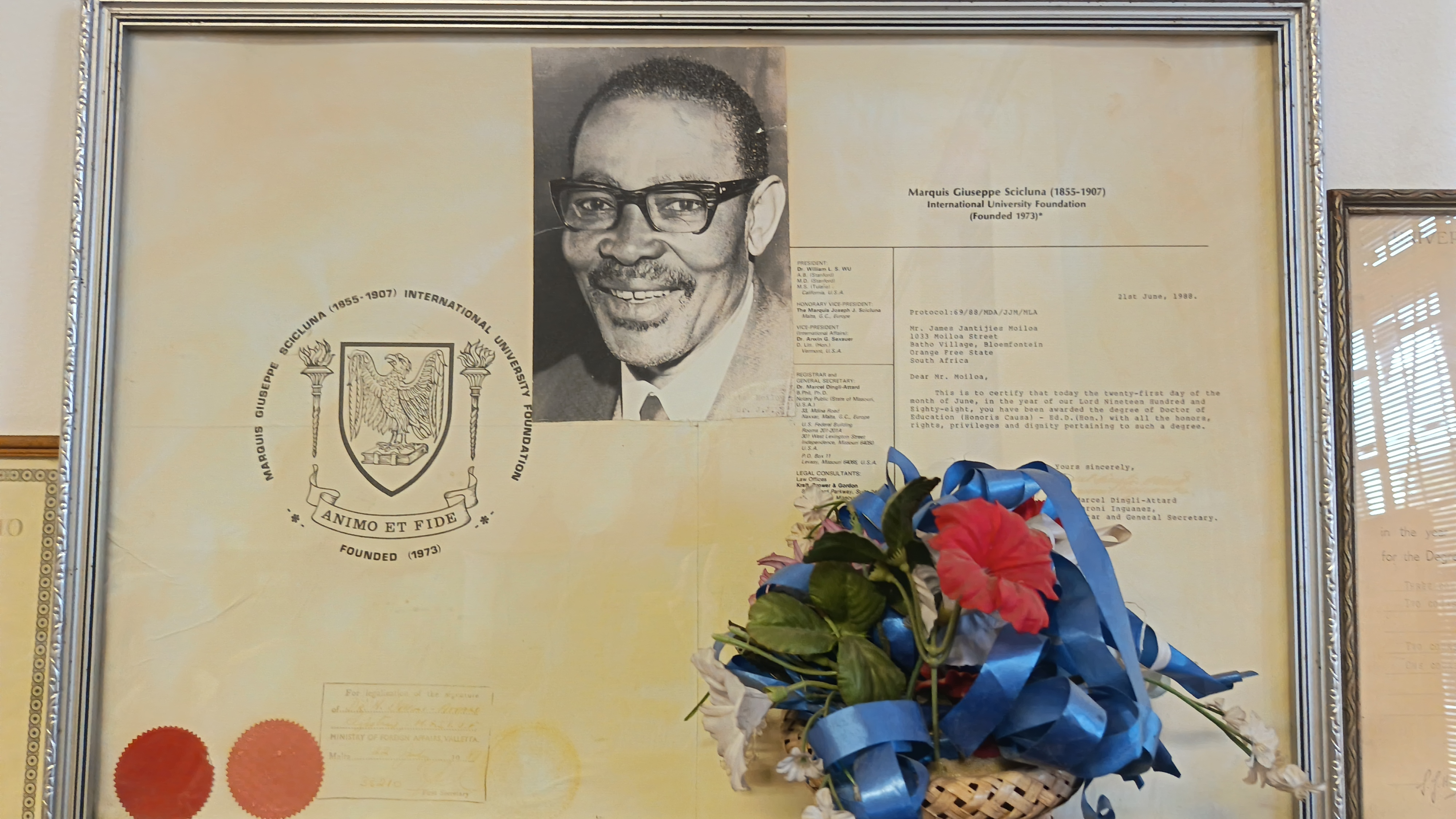
J.J Moiloas corner at Dingolweng, Sesotho Literary Museum

Moiloa's work and collection of artifacts is housed at the Sesotho Literary Museum, Dingolweng, in Bloemfontein.

== Personal life ==
Moiloa was married to Anna Mmadijelwang, and the couple had two sons and four daughters.

== See also ==
- Southern Sotho literature
- South African theatre
