= Makalamabedi Airport =

Airport in Botswana

- IATA: none; ICAO: FBMM

Summary
- Serves: Makalamabedi, Botswana
- Elevation AMSL: 3,100 ft (940 m)
- Coordinates: 20°18′40″S 23°54′25″E

Map
- Location of airport in Botswana

Runways
Direction	Length		Surface
Direction	m	ft	Surface
08/26	1,025	3,363	Dirt
- Source: Great Circle Mapper Google Maps

Makalamabedi Airport (ICAO: FBMM) is an airport serving the village of Makalamabedi in the Central District of Botswana. The runway is across the Boteti River from the village, in North-West District.

== See also ==
- Transport in Botswana
- List of airports in Botswana
