= Machaneng Airport =

Airport in Botswana

- IATA: none; ICAO: FBMG

Summary
- Airport type: Military
- Serves: Machaneng, Botswana
- Elevation AMSL: 2,900 ft (880 m)
- Coordinates: 23°11′05″S 27°30′00″E

Map
- Location of Machaneng Airport in Botswana

Runways
| Direction | Length | | Surface |
| Direction | m | ft | Surface |
|---|---|---|---|
| 11/29 | 1,280 | 4,199 | Sand |
- Source: Landings Google Maps GCM

Machaneng Airport (ICAO: FBMG) is a military airstrip on the northeast side of Machaneng, a town in the Central District of Botswana. The runway is 11 kilometres (6.8 mi) west of the Limpopo River, locally Botswana's border with South Africa.

== See also ==
- Transport in Botswana
- List of airports in Botswana
