= Vaalhoek =

Village in the Kgalagadi District

Coordinates: 26°52′8″S 20°42′40″E

Location of Vaalhoek in Botswana

Vaalhoek is a village in Kgalagadi District of Botswana. It is located at the southern tip of Botswana near Bokspits, close to the border with South Africa, and it has a primary school. The population counted 588 in the 2022 census.
