= Ncaang =

Village in Kgalagadi, Botswana

Coordinates: 23°27′5″S 21°13′33″E

Location of Ncaang

Ncaang is a village in Kgalagadi District of Botswana. It is located in the northern part of the district, in Kalahari Desert. The population was 358 in the 2022 census.
