= Tuli Lodge Airport =

Airport in Botswana

Limpopo Valley Airfield Limpopo Valley Airport
- IATA: TLD; ICAO: FBTL

Summary
- Airport type: Private
- Serves: Mashatu Game Reserve and other lodges in the Northern Tuli Game Reserve, Botswana
- Elevation AMSL: 1,770 ft / 539 m
- Coordinates: 22°11′30″S 29°07′55″E

Map
- Location of airport in Botswana

Runways
| Direction | Length | | Surface |
| Direction | m | ft | Surface |
|---|---|---|---|
| 12/30 | 1,505 | 4,938 | Asphalt |
- GCM Google Maps

Limpopo Valley Airfield (IATA: TLD, ICAO: FBTL) is an airport serving the Northern Tuli Game Reserve, an area of public and private game reserves in eastern Botswana. The airport is owned by Mashatu Game Reserve with a superseded ICAO code of FBLV.

The runway is 2.5 kilometres (1.6 mi) north of Pont Drift, a ford and border crossing station on the Limpopo River, which is locally the border between Botswana and South Africa.

== See also ==
- Transport in Botswana
- List of airports in Botswana
