= Hukuntsi =

- Location in Botswana
- Coordinates: 23°59′56″S 21°46′48″E
- Country: Botswana
- District: Kgalagadi District

Population (2011)
  - Total: 4,654
- Climate: BWh

Hukuntsi is a village in Kgalagadi District (Kalahari) in Botswana.

Hukuntsi, meaning "many corners", is named for its status as one of the four major villages in its region of the Kgalagadi Desert. It's located 114 kilometres away from the village of Kang, off of the Gaborone-Ghanzi highway. It had a population of 5,224 in the 2022 census. The majority of Hukuntsi's population are Bangologa people, a Tswana clan (List of Sotho-Tswana clans).

Hukuntsi is the headquarters for the Kgalagadi North Sub-District thus it is home to the Rural Administration Centre for government offices. Also located in Hukuntsi are a hospital and a clinic, 3 elementary school and 1 community junior secondary school. Amenities available in Hukuntsi include guest houses, several take away restaurants, an independently owned supermarkets, two wholesalers, butcheries and variety shops. The village is served by Hukuntsi Airport.

Weather in Hukuntsi varies dramatically- very cold nights in the winter and very hot days in the summer.

== Lokgwabe ==
Lokgwabe is a village in Kgalagadi District of Botswana. It is located in the Kalahari Desert and the village has a primary school. The population was 1,304 in 2001 census.

In Hukuntsi there is Entabeni Hotel which has up to 20 rooms. The other is Shi Hotel with also up to 20 rooms. There is a bed and breakfast named CM apartments.

== Notable people ==
- Collen Kebinatshipi
