= Camp Okavango Airport =

Airport in North-West, Botswana

Camp Okavango Airstrip
- IATA: none; ICAO: FBCO

Summary
- Airport type: Private
- Serves: Camp Okavango
- Elevation AMSL: 3,150 ft (960 m)
- Coordinates: 19°07′50″S 23°06′05″E

Map
- Location of Camp Okavango Airstrip in Botswana

Runways
Direction	Length		Surface
Direction	m	ft	Surface
13/31	960	3,150	Grass
- Sources: Landings.com Google Maps GCM

Camp Okavango Airstrip (ICAO: FBCO) is a private airstrip serving Camp Okavango, a safari camp in the Okavango Delta, in the North-West District of Botswana.

== See also ==
- Transport in Botswana
- List of airports in Botswana
