= Omaweneno =

Coordinates: 25°45′42″S 22°34′9″E

Location of Omaweneno

Omaweneno is a village in Kgalagadi District of Botswana. It is located north-east of the district capital, Tshabong. The population was 1,256 in the 2022 census. Omaweneno is a Herero word meaning "Where people meet"
