= Tshabong Airport =

Airport in Tsabong, Botswana

- IATA: TBY; ICAO: FBTS

Summary
- Serves: Tsabong, Botswana
- Elevation AMSL: 3,179 ft / 969 m
- Coordinates: 26°02′05″S 22°24′05″E

Map
- Location of airport in Botswana

Runways
Direction	Length		Surface
Direction	m	ft	Surface
03/21	1,050	3,445	Gravel
- Sources: GCM Google Maps

Tshabong Airport (IATA: TBY, ICAO: FBTS), also known as Tsabong Airport, is an airport serving Tsabong, a town in the Kgalagadi District of Botswana.

== See also ==
- Transport in Botswana
- List of airports in Botswana
