= Mpandamatenga =

Coordinates: 18°31′33″S 25°40′17″E

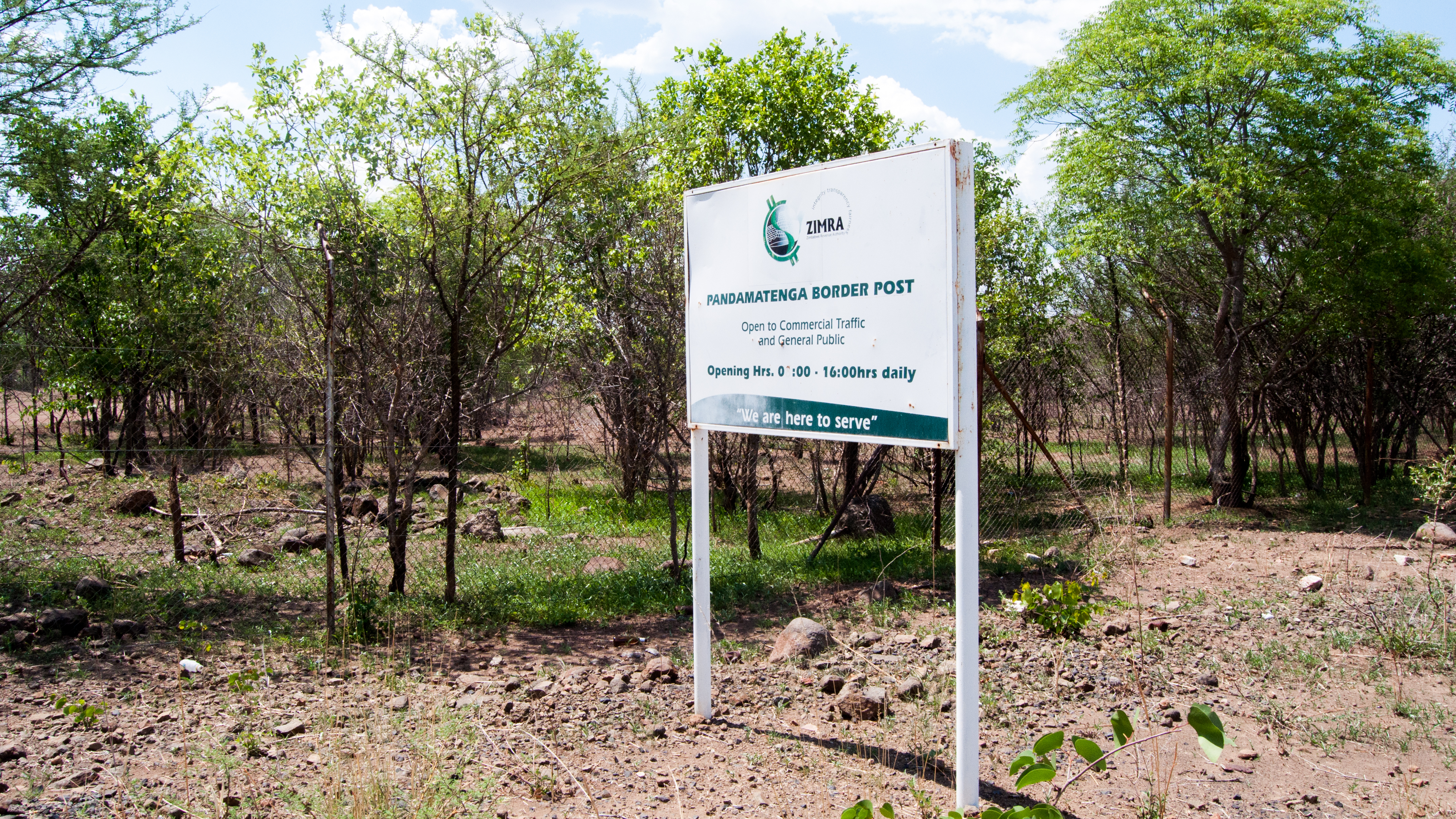
Pandamatenga Border Post Sign

Mpandamatenga is a border post and settlement in Matabeleland North, Zimbabwe, adjacent to the Pandamatenga area in Botswana. It is located within Matetsi Safari Area. It can be reached by road from Hwange town and Hwange National Park.

The village was established in 1871 by a trader, George Westbeech, who set up camp here. He called the place panda-ma-tenga which means "the tree from where trade is done".
