= Zutswa =

Village in Botswana

Coordinates: 24°8′7″S 21°14′50″E

Location of Zutswa

Zutswa is a village in Kgalagadi District of Botswana. It is located in the Kalahari Desert and it has a primary school. The population was 469 in 2011 census.

In 2022, the population had grown to 680. It has the lowest rate of literacy amongst all villages in the district.
