= Kolonkwane =

Village in southwest Botswana

Coordinates: 26°38′37″S 21°59′46″E

Location of Kolonkwane

Kolonkwaneng is a village in Kgalagadi District of Botswana. It is located close to the border with South Africa and it has a primary school. The population was 634 in the 2022 census.
