= Lehututu =

Village in Botswana

Coordinates: 23°55′1″S 21°49′35″E

Location of Lehututu

Lehututu is a village in Kgalagadi District of Botswana. It is in the Kalahari Desert, and it has primary and secondary schools. The population was 2,035 in the 2022 census.
