= Pandamatenga Airport =

Airport in Botswana

- IATA: none; ICAO: FBPA

Summary
- Airport type: Public
- Serves: Pandamatenga
- Elevation AMSL: 3,490 ft (1,060 m)
- Coordinates: 18°31′55″S 25°39′10″E

Map
- Location of Pandamatenga Airport in Botswana

Runways
Direction	Length		Surface
Direction	m	ft	Surface
12/30	1,240	4,068	Grass
- Source: Landings.com Google Maps GCM

Pandamatenga Airport (ICAO: FBPA) is an airstrip serving Pandamatenga, a town in the North-West District of Botswana. Pandamatenga is on Botswana's border with Zimbabwe.

== See also ==
- Transport in Botswana
- List of airports in Botswana
