= Tshane Airport =

Airport in Botswana

- IATA: none; ICAO: FBTE

Summary
- Serves: Tshane, Botswana
- Elevation AMSL: 1,128 m / 3,700 ft
- Coordinates: 24°01′S 021°53′E

Map
- Location of airport in Botswana

Runways
| Direction | Length | | Surface |
| Direction | m | ft | Surface |
|---|---|---|---|
| 08/26 | 1,000 | 3,281 | Salt pan |
- Source: Great Circle Mapper Google Maps

Tshane Airport (ICAO: FBTE) is an airport serving the village of Tshane, Botswana. The Tshane salt pan is very flat and has many tracks but no marked runway.

== See also ==
- Transport in Botswana
- List of airports in Botswana
