= Matsieng Aerodrome =

Airfield in Botswana

- IATA: none; ICAO: FBMA

Summary
- Airport type: Public
- Serves: Rasesa, Botswana
- Elevation AMSL: 3,320 ft (1,010 m)
- Coordinates: 24°21′25″S 26°05′25″E

Map
- Location of Matsieng Aerodrome in Botswana

Runways
Direction	Length		Surface
Direction	m	ft	Surface
06/24	1,300	4,265	Gravel
17/35	850	2,789	Gravel

Matsieng Aerodrome is a general aviation airfield near Rasesa, 44 kilometres (27 mi) north of Gaborone, Botswana. It was built in 2011. The airfield has been the venue for several international air shows.

== Accidents and incidents ==
- On 23 March 2019, a Beechcraft B200 King Air was, reportedly intentionally, flown into the control tower and an adjacent building housing the local flying club after several low-altitude passes. An evacuation had been ordered before the crash and the pilot, who was the sole occupant of the aircraft, was the only person killed; both the control tower and the club building were destroyed.

== See also ==
- Transport in Botswana
- List of airports in Botswana
