= Monong =

Village in Kgalagadi District of Botswana

Coordinates: 23°39′56″S 21°30′50″E

Location of Monong

Monong is a village in Kgalagadi District of Botswana. It is located in Kalahari Desert, and it has a primary school. The population was 392 in the 2022 census.
