= Lokgwabe =

Village in Kgalagadi District of Botswana

Coordinates: 24°5′46″S 21°46′41″E

Location of Lokgwabe

Lokgwabe is a village in Kgalagadi District of Botswana, located in the Kalahari Desert. The population was 1,417 in the 2011 census. The village has a primary school.

Lokgwabe is located in the Central Africa region. Its official currency is the Botswanan pula (BWP).
