= Ngwatle =

Village in Botswana

- Village
- Location within Botswana
- Coordinates: 23.697778°S 21.081667°E
- Country: Botswana
- District: Kgalagadi District

Population (2011)
  - Total: 271

Ngwatle is a village in the Kgalagadi District of Botswana. It is located in the Kalahari Desert, in the north-west part of the district. The population was 461 in the 2022 census.
