= Hunhukwe =

Village in Kgalagadi District of Botswana

Coordinates: 23°24′43″S 21°36′34″E

Location of Hunhukwe

Hunhukwe is a village in Kgalagadi District of Botswana. It is located in the northern part of the district, and it has a primary school and a clinic. The population was 565 in the 2022 census.
