= Rakops Airport =

Airport in Botswana

- IATA: none; ICAO: FBRK

Summary
- Serves: Rakops, Botswana
- Elevation AMSL: 914 m / 3,000 ft
- Coordinates: 21°00′S 024°20′E

Map
- Location of airport in Botswana

Runways
Direction	Length		Surface
Direction	m	ft	Surface
	1,015	3,330
- Source: Great Circle Mapper

Rakops Airport (ICAO: FBRK) is an airport serving the village of Rakops, Botswana.
