= Machaneng =

Village in Botswana

Coordinates: 23°11′21″S 27°29′18″E

Location of Machaneng

Machaneng is a village in Central District of Botswana. It is 11 kilometres (6.8 mi) from the Limpopo river and the border with South Africa, 80 kilometres (50 mi) east of Mahalapye. The population was 2,050 in 2001 census.

The Botswana Prison Service (BPS) operates the Machaneng Prison.

It is served by Machaneng Airport.
