= Sikwane =

Village in Botswana

- Village
- Interactive map of Sikwane
- Coordinates: 24.6370°S 26.4047°E
- Country: Botswana
- District: Kgatleng

Population
  - Total: 1,580

Sikwane is a village in Kgatleng District of Botswana. It had a population of 1,580 in the 2022 Census. It is located along the Madikwe River.

The village is located 55 km east of Gaborone, and also approximately 30 km northwest of Mochudi, the district capital. It is close to the border with South Africa, Deertepoort Border Post. The village is predominantly inhabited by the Bakgatla people, who are part of the larger Tswana ethnic group.

== Economy ==
The main economic activities in Sikwane include subsistence farming, livestock rearing, and small-scale trading. Many residents also commute to nearby Mochudi or Gaborone for employment opportunities.

== Infrastructure ==
Sikwane has a primary school, a clinic, and a few shops. The village is connected to the national electricity grid, and many households have access to piped water. The village is home to several important cultural sites, including the Sikwane Kgotla (traditional meeting place).
