= Neo Moroka =

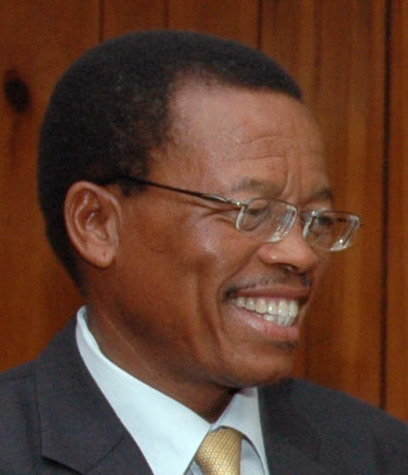

Minister of Trade and Industry
- In office 2004–2009

Personal details
- Political party: Botswana Democratic Party

Neo Moroka is Chairman of De Beers Botswana. He formerly was a politician in Botswana, serving as Minister of Trade and Industry from 2004 to 2009.

Moroka earned degrees in ecology and was an agricultural advisor to Barclays Bank from 1984 to 1991. He subsequently worked as managing director at BP Botswana. He was elected to the National Assembly for the first time in the October 2004 general election from Kgalagadi South constituency, representing the governing Botswana Democratic Party. Following the election, he was appointed as Minister of Trade and Industry on November 9, 2004.

Moroka owns a farm near Makopong in Kgalagadi District.
