= Bogogobo =

- Village
- Location within Botswana
- Coordinates: 26°39′42″S 21°55′50″E
- Country: Botswana
- District: Kgalagadi District

Population (2011)
  - Total: 360

Bogogobo is a village in the Kgalagadi District of Botswana. It is located near the border with South Africa and has a primary school. The population was 354 in the 2022 census.

== Demographics ==
According to the 2022 census the village population was 354.
