= Khuis =

Coordinates: 26°39′27″S 21°50′19″E

Location of Khuis

Khuis is a village in Kgalagadi District of Botswana. It is located close to the border with South Africa. Khuis has a primary school, and the population was 950 in the 2022 census.
