= Rapples Pan =

Coordinates: 26°49′50″S 20°48′55″E

Location of Rapples Pan

Rapples Pan is a village in Kgalagadi District of south-western Botswana. It is located at the far south-western tip of the country, close to the South African border.

== Education ==
It has a primary school.

== Population ==
The population was recorded as 338, by the 2022 census.
