= The Maker (hotel) =

Historic inn in Maine, United States

- Interactive map of the The Maker area

General information
- Location: Hudson, New York, U.S., 302 Warren Street
- Coordinates: 42.25297°N 73.79096°W
- Opening: August 6, 2020 (5 years ago)
- Owner: Lev Glazman; Alina Roytberg

Technical details
- Floor area: 14,000 sqft

Other information
- Number of rooms: 11
- Number of suites: 4
- Number of restaurants: 3
- Facilities: swimming pool gymnasium

Website
- www.themaker.com

The Maker is a hotel in Hudson, New York, United States. Owned by Lev Glazman and Alina Roytberg, it opened on August 6, 2020.

The hotel, which has eleven bedrooms, occupies three historic buildings: a 19th-century carriage house, a Georgian mansion and a Greek Revival building. Its library featured several hundreds of books from the Strand Book Store in New York City. Its four suites are named the Architect, the Artist, the Writer and the Gardener.

The hotel, which is 14,000 square feet (1,300 m^{2}), has three dining areas: a café, a lounge and a restaurant (located in a conservatory).
