= Make, Botswana =

Coordinates: 23°41′28″S 21°46′57″E

Location of Make

Make is a village in Kgalagadi District of Botswana. It is located in the Kalahari Desert and it has a primary school. The population was 502 in the 2022 census.
