= Struizendam =

Village in southwestern Botswana

Coordinates: 26°39′30″S 20°38′28″E

Location of Struizendam

Struizendam is a village in Kgalagadi District of Botswana. It is located at the southern tip of Botswana, close to the border with South Africa, and it has a primary school. The population was 727 according to the 2022 census.
