= Rakops =

Coordinates: 21°2′13″S 24°24′33″E

Location of Rakops

Rakops, also known as Tsienyane, is a village in Central District of Botswana. It is located south-west of Makgadikgadi Pan, and is served by local Rakops Airport. The population was 6,396 in 2011 census.
