= Makalamabedi =

Coordinates: 20°19′25″S 23°53′16″E

Location of Makalamabedi

Makalamabedi is a village in North-West District of Botswana. It is located in the south-east part of the district, and is served by the local Makalamabedi Airport. The population was 344 in 2001 census.
