= Pandamatenga =

Village in Chobe District, Botswana

Coordinates: 18°32′35″S 25°38′35″E

Location of Pandamatenga

Pandamatenga is a village in the Chobe District, Botswana. It is located close to the country's border with Zimbabwe, whose border post is known as Mpandamatenga.

Both commercial and communal farming takes place in the lands around Pandamatenga. Approximately 40 000 hectares are planted to crops such as sweet sorghum, cowpeas and sunflower. The introduction of Australian farming techniques has increased productivity in the area. The population of Pandamatenga was 1,545 in the 2001 census.

Pandamatenga is served by the Pandamatenga Airport.
