= Savuti Airport =

Airport in Botswana

- IATA: SVT; ICAO: FBSV

Summary
- Serves: Savuti, Botswana
- Elevation AMSL: 3,150 ft / 960 m
- Coordinates: 18°31′14″S 24°04′36″E

Map
- Location of airport in Botswana

Runways
Direction	Length		Surface
Direction	m	ft	Surface
04/22	2,200	7,218	partially paved
- Source: GCM Google Maps

Savuti Airport (IATA: SVT, ICAO: FBSV) is an airport serving the Chobe National Park in the North-West District of Botswana. The runway is 4.5 kilometres (2.8 mi) north of the village and campsites of Savuti.

== See also ==
- Transport in Botswana
- List of airports in Botswana
