= Bray, South Africa =

Bray
- Location within North West (South African province) Location within South Africa
- Coordinates: 25.465°S 23.702°E
- Country: South Africa
- Province: North West
- District: Dr Ruth Segomotsi Mompati
- Municipality: Kagisano-Molopo

Area
  - Total: 4.24 km^{2} (1.64 sq mi)

Population (2011)
  - Total: 1,357
  - Density: 320/km^{2} (829/sq mi)

Racial makeup (2011)
  - Black African: 95.4%
  - Coloured: 3.6%
  - Indian/Asian: 0.4%
  - White: 0.4%
  - Other: 0.1%

First languages (2011)
  - Tswana: 92.8%
  - Afrikaans: 3.2%
  - S. Ndebele: 1.5%
  - English: 1.3%
  - Other: 1.1%
- Time zone: UTC+2 (SAST)
- Postal code (street): 8620
- PO box: 8620
- Area code: 053

Bray is a village in Kagisano-Molopo Local Municipality in the North West province of South Africa. It is situated on the border with Botswana opposite a village of the same name in that country.
