= Makemake (disambiguation) =

Makemake is a dwarf planet in the Kuiper belt.

Makemake may also refer to:

- Makemake (deity), the creator of humanity in the mythology of Easter Island
- "Make Make", a song by Mike Oldfield from Heaven's Open
- Make-Make, an album by Jabberwocky
- The Makemakes, an Austrian pop-rock band
