= Phuduhudu, Kgalagadi =

Coordinates: 23°56′50″S 22°59′3″E

Location of Phuduhudu

Phuduhudu is a village in Kgalagadi District of Botswana. It is located in the northeast part of the district, in the Kalahari Desert, and it has a primary school. The population was 661 in the 2022 census.
