= Tshane =

Coordinates: 24°1′1″S 21°52′8″E

Location of Tshane

Tshane is a village in Kgalagadi District of Botswana. It is situated in Kalahari Desert, and is served by local Tshane Airport. The village has a primary school and the population was 1092 in the 2022 census. The lowest temperature registered in Tshane was −8.0 °C (17.6 °F). The record high temperature registered in Tshane was 41.0 °C (105.8 °F).

Around Tshane there are large villages like Lehututu, Hukuntsi and Lokwabe. The most populated place is Lehututu with two primary schools, secondary and Matcheng Bridgate school. Almost all tourists visit Lehututu for accommodation and leisure as there is a hotel with a night club.
