= Rasesa =

- Location in Botswana
- Coordinates: 24°22′27″S 26°4′21″E
- Country: Botswana
- District: Kgatleng District

Population (2001)
  - Total: 2,461

Rasesa is a village in the Kgatleng District of Botswana. The village is located 10 km west of Mochudi, along the Gaborone–Mahalapye road (A1 road). The population was 2,461 in the 2001 census.
