= Werda, Botswana =

Village in the Kgalagadi District

Coordinates: 25°16′6″S 23°16′30″E

Location of Werda

Werda is a village in Kgalagadi District of Botswana. It is located close to the border with South Africa. The population was 3349 in the 2022 census.
