= Bray, Botswana =

Village in Botswana

Bray
- Village
- Location within Botswana
- Coordinates: 25°27′02″S 23°42′43″E
- Country: Botswana
- District: Kgalagadi

Population (2011)
  - Total: 1,041
- Time zone: UTC+2:00 (SAST)

Bray is a village in Kgalagadi District of Botswana. It is located in the eastern part of the district, on the border with South Africa opposite a village of the same name in that country. The population was 1,286 in the 2022 census. It has a primary school.
