= Bokspits =

Coordinates: 26°53′50″S 20°41′26″E

Location of Bokspits

Bokspits is a village in Kgalagadi District of Botswana. It is the southernmost village in Botswana and has a border post with South Africa near the Kgalagadi Transfrontier Park. The population counted 705 in the 2022 census.

== Etymology ==
There is a popular theory that the name of the town is named after someone called Bok, who was one of the settlers who owned a well in the region.
