= Makopong =

Village in Kgalagadi District, Botswana

Coordinates: 25°19′53″S 22°58′43″E

Location of Makopong

Makopong is a village in Kgalagadi District of Botswana. It is located close to the border with South Africa. The population was 1,788 in the 2022 census.

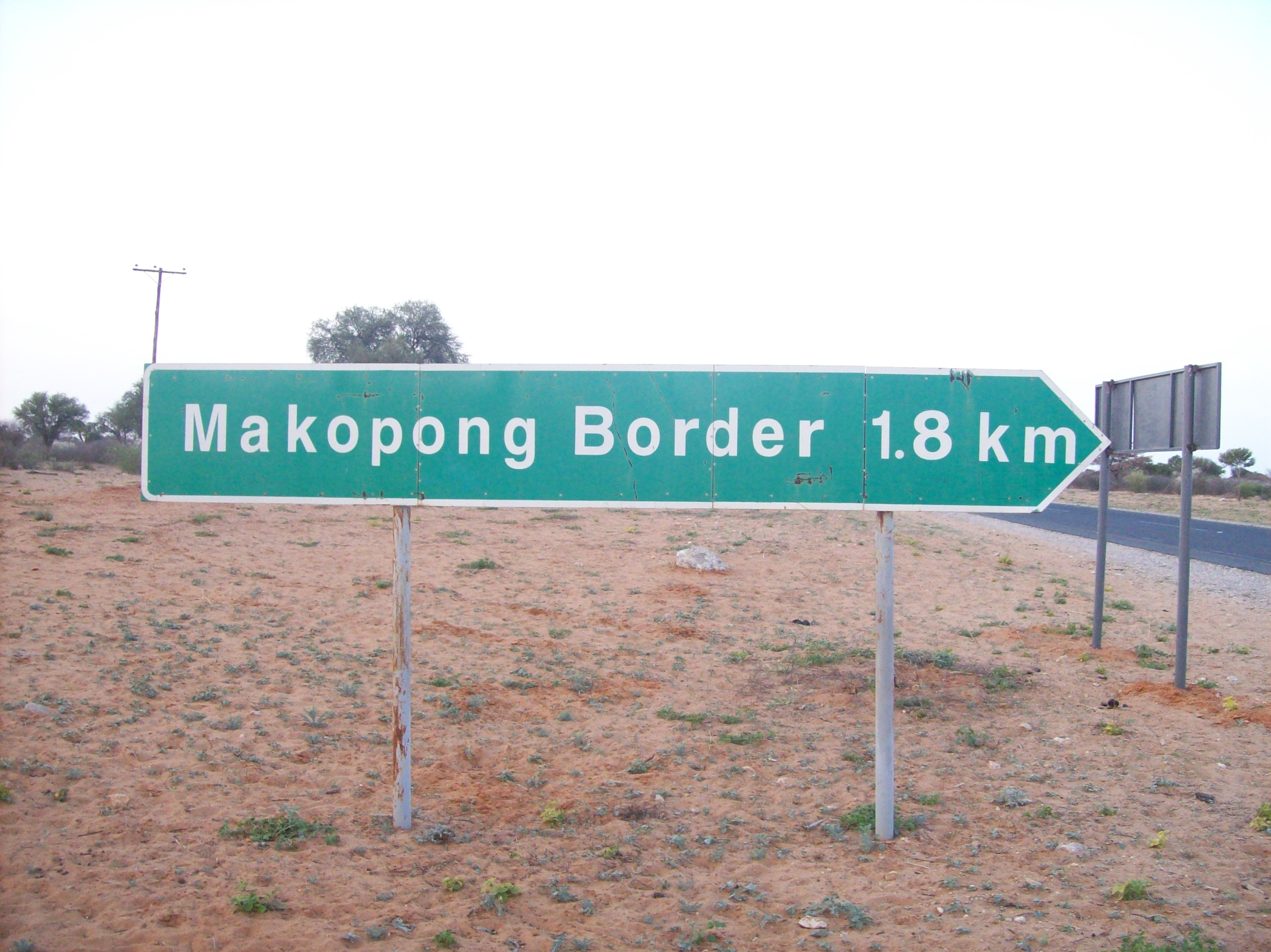
