= Kang, Botswana =

Village in Kgalagadi District of Botswana

Coordinates: 23°40′16″S 22°47′21″E

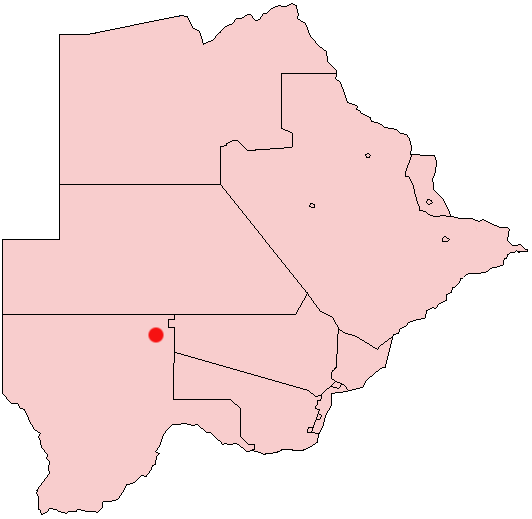
Location of Kang in Botswana

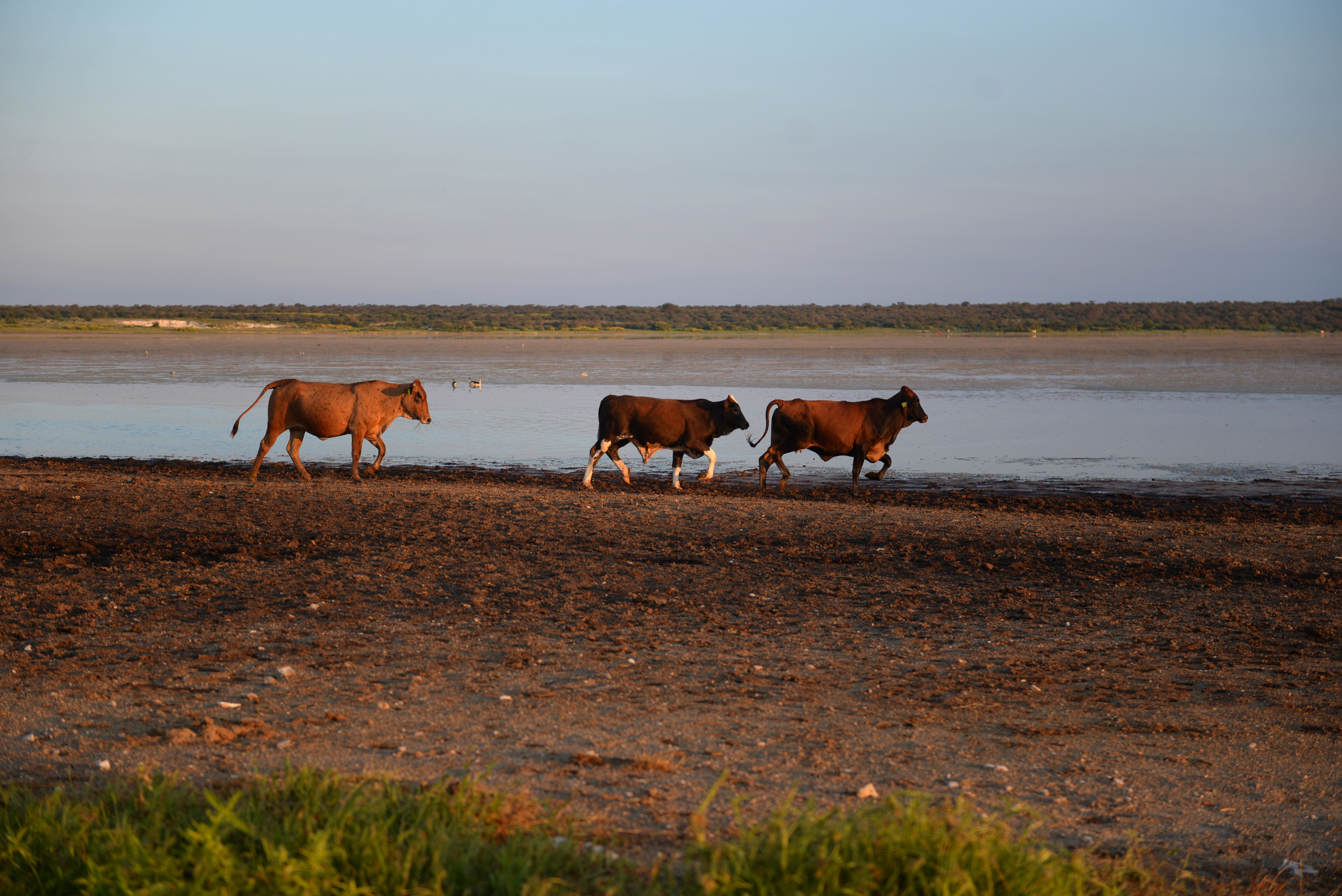
Landscape with cattle

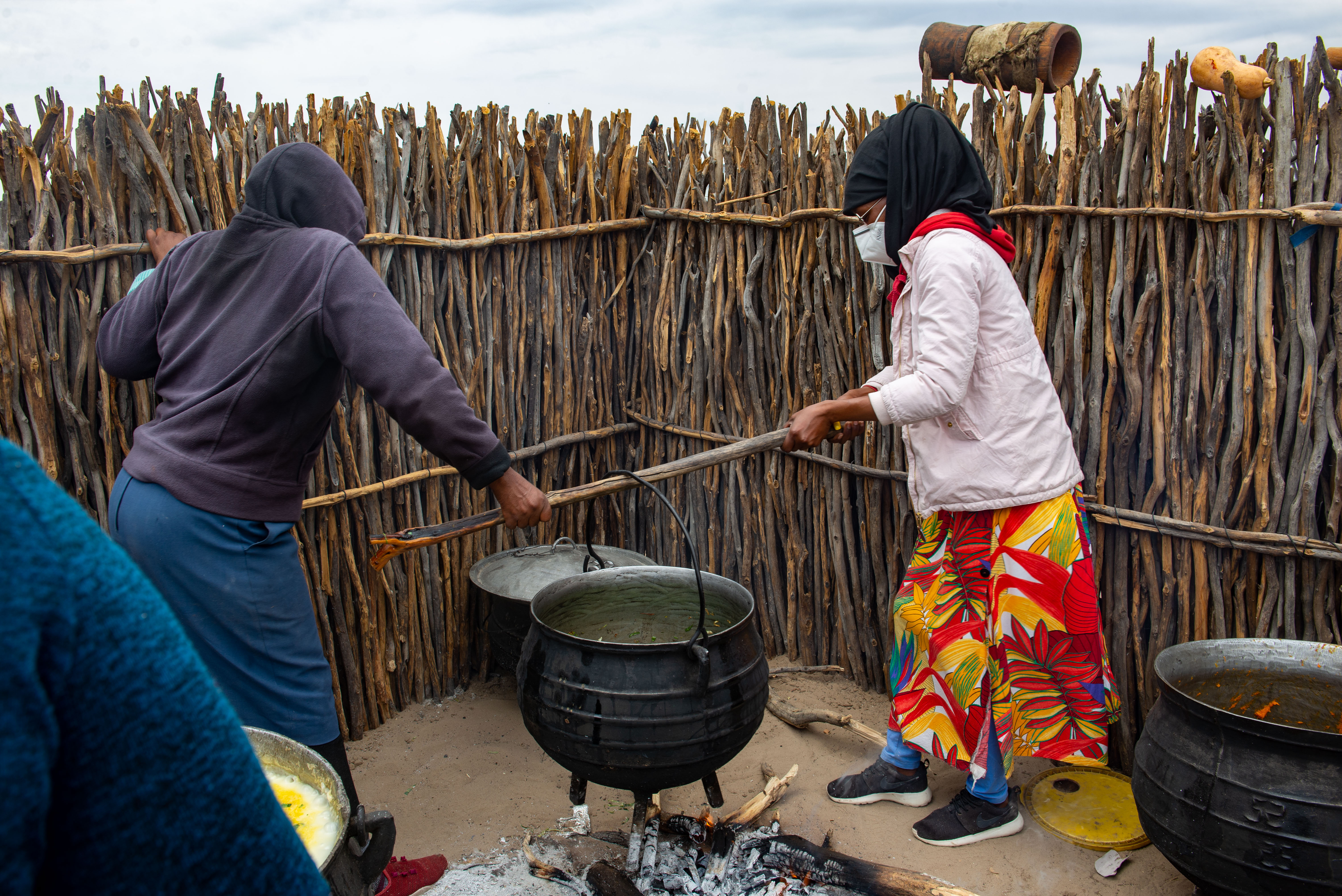
Food preparation

Kang (ǃXóõ: ′ǀná̰m) is a village in Kgalagadi District of Botswana.

== Geography ==
It is situated in the Kalahari Desert on the Trans-Kalahari Highway between Ghanzi in the north and Sekoma in the south. Kang provides access to the Kgalagadi Transfrontier Park in the south-west and the Central Kalahari Game Reserve in the north-east. The route via Ghanzi reaches the Namibian border, whilst that to Sekoma leads to Gaborone, the capital of Botswana.

== Demographics ==
The population was 6,764 according to the 2022 census. The village is growing rapidly.

== Governance ==
Kang falls under the Kgalagadi North constituency, whose Member of Parliament is Hon. Talita Monnakgotla. The village is divided into seven wards: Gasekgalo, Gamonyemana (main ward), Gamotshoto, Gapanyana, Gamoriti, Kaatshwene, and Tshwaragano ward. The village is led by a female chief, Kgosi Basadi Seipone, daughter of late former chief Churchill Pego Seipone.

The village's key development areas include the Central Roads Depot, Central Transport Organisation (with a fuel point), Airstrip/Landing ground (along Kang-Tsetseng road). Department Road Transport Service offices are present. A mini Rural Administration Centre/ Service Centre is present. A Brigade Centre and police station are there. Health Clinic, Magistrate Court, Wildlife offices, Botswana Power Corporation Offices, Water Utilities Corporation offices, Facility Management offices.

== Education ==
A Botswana Open University Regional Campus is present along with a Senior Secondary, Junior Secondary School and two primary schools.
