= Tsabong =

Tshabong
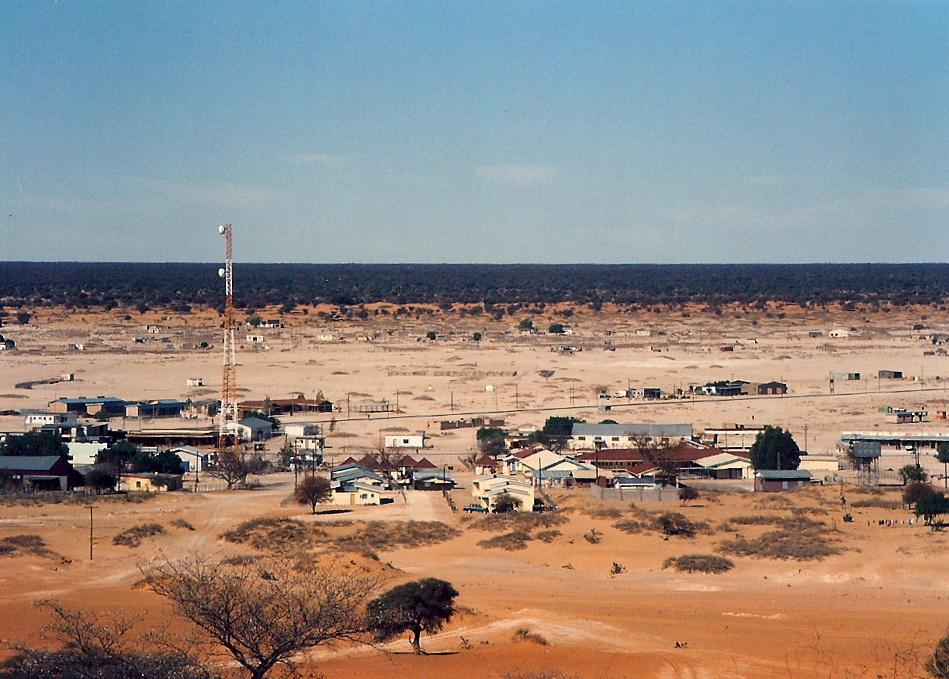
- The town of Tsabong

- Location in Botswana
- Coordinates: 26°1′12″S 22°24′20″E
- Country: Botswana
- District: Kgalagadi District
- Elevation: 962 m (3,156 ft)

Population (2011)
  - Total: 8,939
- Time zone: 0200 UTC
- Climate: BWh

Tshabong, also spelled Tsabong, is the administrative centre of the Kgalagadi District in Botswana. It is located in the Kalahari Desert. The population was 8939 in the 2011 census.

The primary hospital in Tshabong serves a huge outlying area and includes several tuberculosis refuges where patients and their families can stay while undergoing lengthy outpatient treatment.

Near the town is the Tshabong kimberlite field, one of the largest diamondiferous kimberlite fields in the world. The field covers a large area of southwestern Botswana and contains dozens of known kimberlite bodies. A 2019 study of Botswana's kimberlite fields recorded 86 kimberlites in the Tshabong field. The field is notable for the exceptionally large size of several of its kimberlites, particularly the MK1 pipe, which covers approximately 140–180 hectares and has been described as one of the largest known diamondiferous kimberlites in the world.

Tshabong is the site of Botswana's coldest recorded temperature, registering a temperature of −15.0 °C (5.0 °F). The record high temperature registered in Tsabong was 42.6 °C (108.7 °F).

The town is served by Tshabong Airport.

The Botswana Prison Service (BPS) operates the Tsabong Prison.

In September 2023, Botswana's first carbon credit program, led by the startup Gazelle Ecosolutions, began in and around Tsabong.

The solar eclipse of November 25, 2030 will be visible in Tsabong.

== Schools ==
- Tsabong Primary school
- Nhake Primary school
- Seetelo Memorial Primary school
- Tsabong Unified Secondary School

== Notable residents ==
- Neo Moroka, Government minister 2004–2009
