= Kgalagadi District =

Kgalagadi
- District
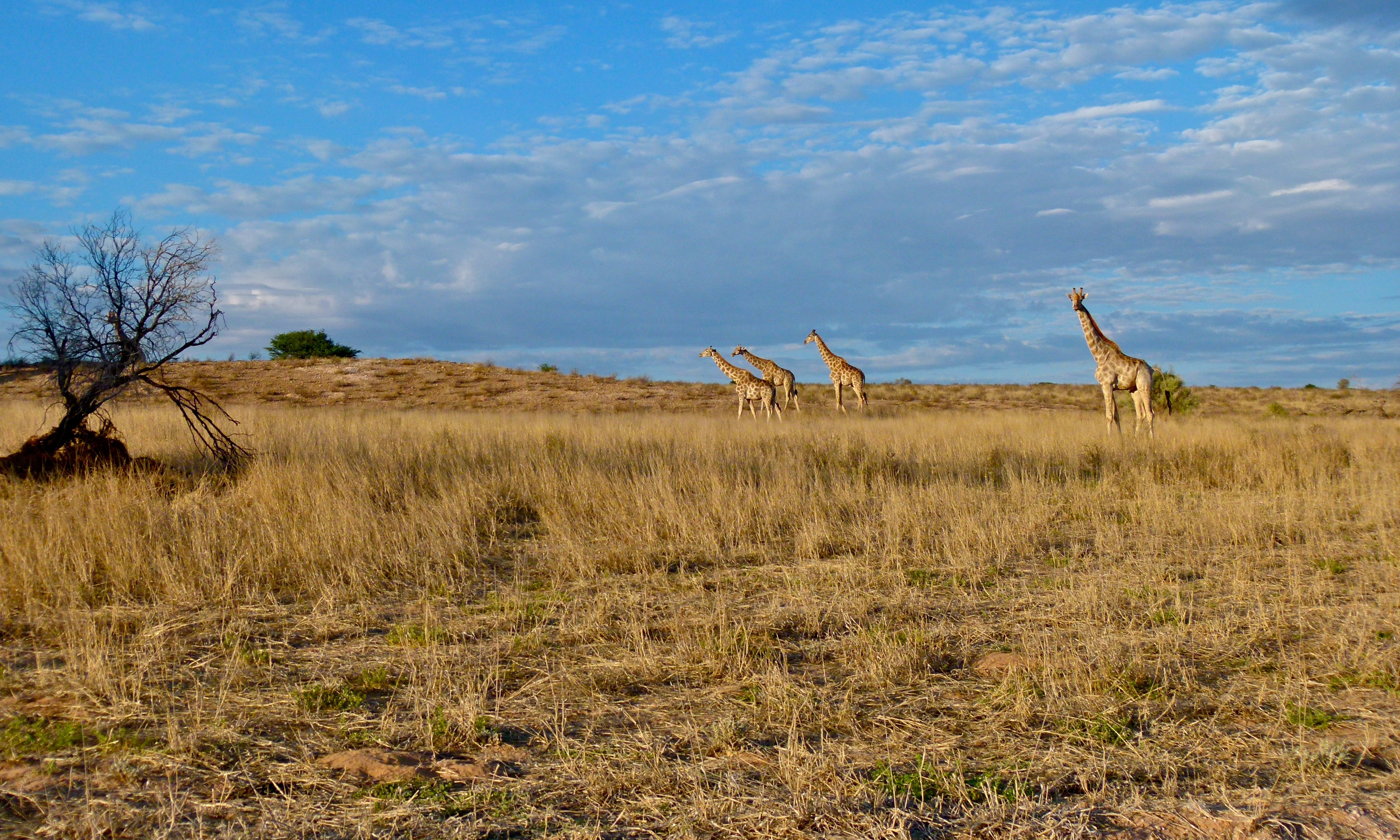
- Kgalagadi Transfrontier Park

- Location within Botswana
- Coordinates: 25°00′S 22°00′E
- Country: Botswana
- Capital: Tsabong

Area
  - Total: 105,200 km^{2} (40,600 sq mi)

Population (2001 census)
  - Total: 42,049
  - Density: 0.3997/km^{2} (1.035/sq mi)
- Time zone: UTC+2 (Central Africa Time)
- HDI (2017): 0.683 medium · 8th

Kgalagadi is a district in southwest Botswana, lying along the country's border with Namibia and South Africa. The administrative center is Tsabong. The district of Kgalagadi covers a large part of the Kalahari Desert. It has a total area of 105,200 km^{2} and has a population of 42,000 (2001). More than one-third of the district is covered by the Kgalagadi Transfrontier Park, which extends into South Africa, and which is a major tourist attraction.

As of 2011, the total population of the district was 50,492 (compared to 42,049 in 2001). The growth rate of population during the decade was 1.85. Kgalagadi's population represents 2.49 per cent of the total population of Botswana. The majority of employees (in 2011 there were 10,530 people in work) were working within the transport & communication and public administration sectors. The district is administered by a district administration and district council.

== Geography ==
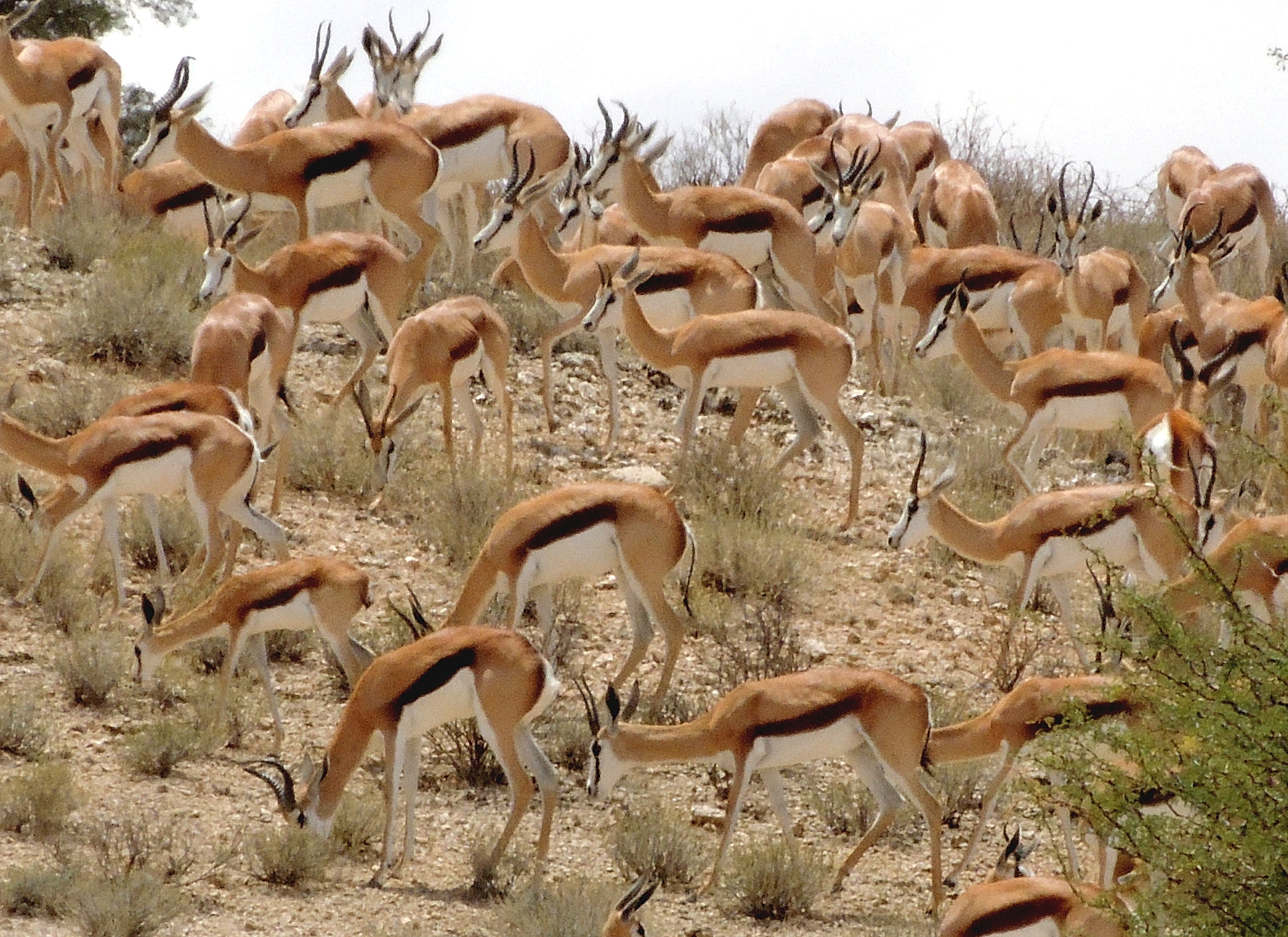
Springbok in Kgalagadi

Kgalagadi borders Omaheke Region, Namibia in the northwest, Hardap Region, Namibia in the southwest, Northern Cape Province, South Africa in the south, North West Province, South Africa in the southeast and domestically, Ghanzi District in the north, Kweneng District in the northeast, and Southern District in the east. Kgalagadi means "land of the thirst". The largest settlement in the district is Tsabong, which had a population of 8939 in 2011 census while Hukuntsi and Kang had 4654 and 5985, respectively. Most part of Botswana has tableland slopes sliding from east to west. The region has an average elevation of around 915 m (3,002 ft) above the mean sea level. The vegetation type is Savannah, with tall grasses, bushes and trees. The annual precipitation is around 25 cm (9.8 in), most of which is received during the summer season from November to May. Most of the rivers in the region are seasonal, with Limpopo River, which are prone to flash floods, being the most prominent. The tourist and game reserves in the region are Ghanzi, Central Kalahari Game Reserve, Deception Valley, Ghanzi Craft, Kgalagadi Transfrontier Park, Khutse Game Reserve and Kuru Museum and Cultural Centre.

== Demographics ==
Historical population
Year	Pop.	±%
1981	24,059	—
1991	31,134	+29.4%
2001	42,049	+35.1%
2011	50,492	+20.1%

As of 2011, the total population of the district was 50,492 compared to 42,049 in 2001. The growth rate of population during the decade was 1.85. The population in the district was 2.49 per cent of the total population in the country. The sex ratio stood at 101.78 for every 100 males, compared to 101.18 in 2001. The average house hold size was 3.12 in 2011 compared to 4.31 in 2001. There were 1,576 craft and related workers, 628 clerks, 4,039 people working in elementary occupation 256 legislators, administrators and managers 614 Plant & machine operators and assemblers, 266 professionals, 1,278 service workers, shop and market sales workers, 1,309 skilled agricultural and related workers 771 technicians and associated professionals, making the total work force to 10,770.

== Economy and education ==
As of 2011, there were a total of 41 schools in the district, with no private schools. The total number of students in the Council schools was 8,869 while there were none in private schools. The total number of students enrolled in the district was 8,869: 4,211 girls and 4,658 boys. The total number of qualified teachers was 445, 315 female and 130 male. There were around 23 temporary teachers, 10 male and 13 female. There were no untrained teachers in the district.

As of 2006, 3,353 were involved in agriculture, 294 in construction, 774 in education, 86 in electricity and water, 32 in finance, 344 in health, 375 in hotels and restaurants, 413 in manufacturing, 91 in other community services, 842 in private households, 1,880 in public administration, 195 in real estate, 65 in transport and communications, 1,786 in wholesale and retail trade. The total number of workers was 10,530: 6,334 male and 4,195 female.

== Administration ==
Botswana gained independence from the British in 1966 and adapted the colonial administration framework to form its district administration. The policies were modified during 1970-74 to address some of the basic issues. The district is administered by a district administration and district council which are responsible for local administration. The policies for the administration are framed by the Ministry of Local Government. The major activities of the council are Tribal Administration, Remote Area Development and Local Governance. The executive powers of the council are vested on a commissioner appointed by the central government. Technical services wing of the Department of Local Government is responsible for developing roads, infrastructure in villages like water supply, schools and recreational facilities. All the staff of the local administration expect District Administration are selected via Unified Local Government Services (ULGS) and the Ministry of Local Government is responsible for their training, deployment and career development.

=== Sub-districts and Villages ===
Kgalagadi consists of 2 sub-districts, namely:

Sub-district	Number of villages
Tshabong	21
Hukuntsi	14

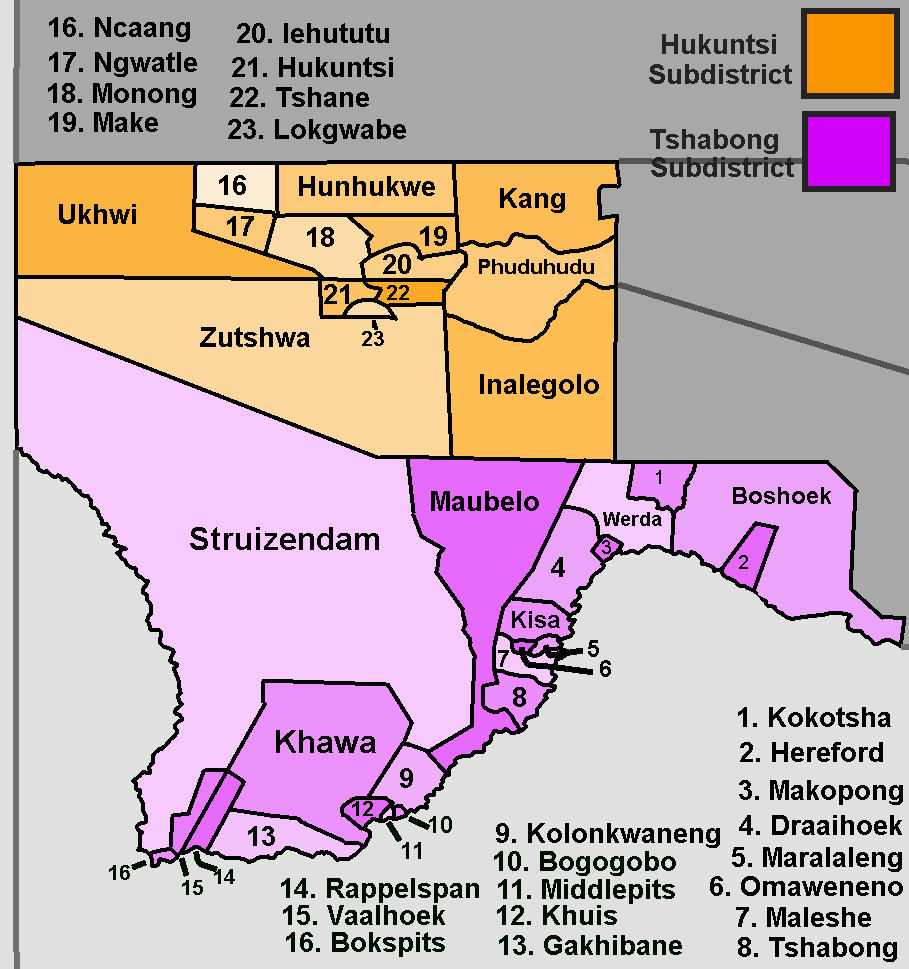
Map of the sub-districts and village divisions of Kgalagadi

These sub-districts are further subdivided into 35 villages.

- Tshabong has the following villages: Bogogobo, Bokspits, Bray, Gachibana, Khisa, Khuis, Khwawa, Kokotsha, Kolonkwane, Makopong, Maleshe, Maralaleng, Maubelo, Middlepits, Omaweneno, Phepheng (Draaihoek), Rapples Pan, Struizendam, Tsabong, Vaalhoek, Werda.
- Hukuntsi has the following villages: Hukuntsi, Hunhukwe, Inalegolo, Kang, Lehututu, Lokgwabe, Make, Monong, Ncaang, Ngwatle, Phuduhudu, Tshane, Ukwi, Zutswa.

== See also ==
- Sub-districts of Botswana
