= Eswatini Railways =

Railway operator in Eswatini

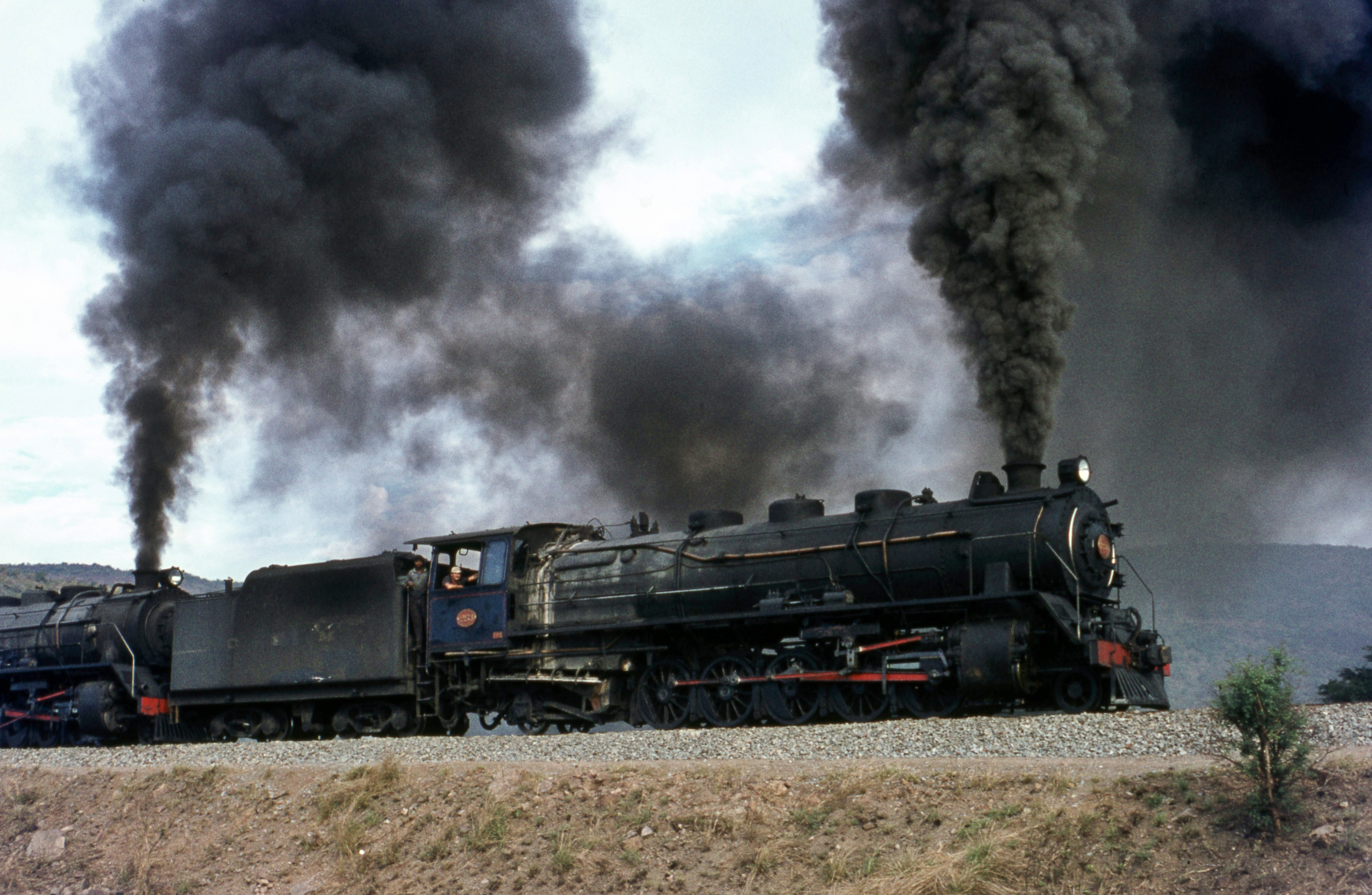
Portos e Caminhos de Ferro de Moçambique (CFM) Series 250 steam locomotive no. 253 (Henschel, 1955) (centre) and a sister engine (left) with a train of iron ore wagons (not visible in the photograph) on the Goba railway, Eswatini

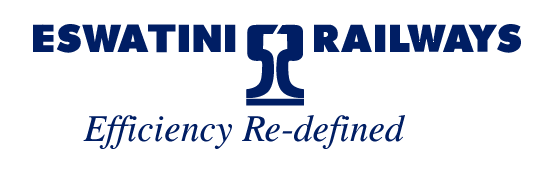

Eswatini Railways (ESR), formerly known as Swaziland Railway or Swazi Rail, is the national railway corporation of Eswatini.

== Overview ==
Map of the Eswatini Railways network

As in the rest of Southern Africa, the 301 kilometres (187 mi) rail system of Eswatini is built to the narrow Cape gauge of 1,067 mm (3 ft 6 in). ESR only provides service for transportation of goods, not passengers.

ESR's rail system is used to connect the land-locked country to the sea. The east-west link, called the Goba line, leads from Matsapha (near Manzini) through Sidvokodvo, Phuzumoya and Mpaka to Goba in Mozambique. From Goba a Mozambique Ports and Railways line connects to the ports of Matola and Maputo. Swazi Rail also has two connections to South Africa: a northern link from Mpaka to Komatipoort in Mpumalanga on the Pretoria–Maputo railway, and a southern link from Phuzumoya to Golela in KwaZulu-Natal, from where the Transnet network connects to the ports of Richards Bay and Durban.

== History ==
In 1902 the British administration of Eswatini agreed with the Portuguese administration of Mozambique to construct a railway line from Lourenço Marques (now Maputo) to Eswatini. The Mozambican section as far as Goba was opened in 1905, but the line was not continued across the border. In 1927 the Zululand Railway in South Africa reached Golela on the southern border of Eswatini. The development of the Ngwenya Mine in the 1960s gave a new impetus to railway construction in Eswatini. Between 1961 and 1964, the east-west line was constructed from Goba to Matsapha and onwards to Ngwenya. Mining at Ngwenya ceased by 1980, and the railway beyond Matsapha was abandoned.

The Mozambican War of Independence and the subsequent Mozambican Civil War caused disruption to Swazi trade through the Mozambican ports, and in 1977 the South African Railways agreed to the construction of a link from the railhead at Golela to the existing line at Phuzumoya. This line, opened in 1978, gave Eswatini rail access to Durban and Richards Bay. In 1986, the northern link from Komatipoort to Mpaka was opened, providing a shorter route for traffic from Phalaborwa and the Lowveld to Richards Bay.

== Managed infrastructure ==
The company manages three main railway lines, the Goba railway, the Komatipoort railway and the Richards Bay railway.

=== Goba railway line ===
It is the main railway trunk in Eswatini. It serves as a link between the city of Matsapha and the city of Mlawula, allowing connection with the port of Maputo, in Mozambique.

=== Komatipoort railway line ===
It serves as a connection between the cities of Komatipoort, in South Africa, and Mpaka, in Eswatini.

=== Richards Bay railway line ===
It serves as a connection between the cities of Richards Bay, in South Africa, and Siphofaneni/Phuzumoya, in Eswatini.

== Passenger Service ==
Eswatini Rail advertises a tourist train, but does not offer a certain date for the next course.

== Interconnection projects ==
=== Swazilink ===
In January 2012, the Swazilink project was announced, which would connect Sidvokodvo to Lothair in Mpumalanga in South Africa. This would divert freight traffic from the Richards Bay line and the Goba line. In June 2014, SR estimated that the link would cost R17 billion and could enter service in 2017.

== See also ==
- Transport in Eswatini
