= Goba railway =

Overview
- Status: Operational
- Termini: Port of Maputo, Maputo, Mozambique; Matsapha, Eswatini

Service
- Type: Cape gauge
- Operator(s): CFM and ESR

History
- Opened: 1912

Technical
- Line length: 466.8 km (290.1 mi)
- Track gauge: 1,067 mm (3 ft 6 in)

Goba railway, also called Swaziland-Maputo railway and Matsapha-Maputo railway, is a railway that connects the city of Maputo, Mozambique, to the city from Matsapha, in Eswatini. It is 466.8 km long, in a 1067 mm gauge.

On the Mozambican stretch, between Maputo and Goba, the managing company is Mozambique Ports and Railways (CFM); on the Eswatinean (swazi) stretch, between the cities of Mlawula and Matsapha, the administration is done by the company Eswatini Railways (ESR).

Its main maritime logistics facility is the port of Maputo.

== History ==
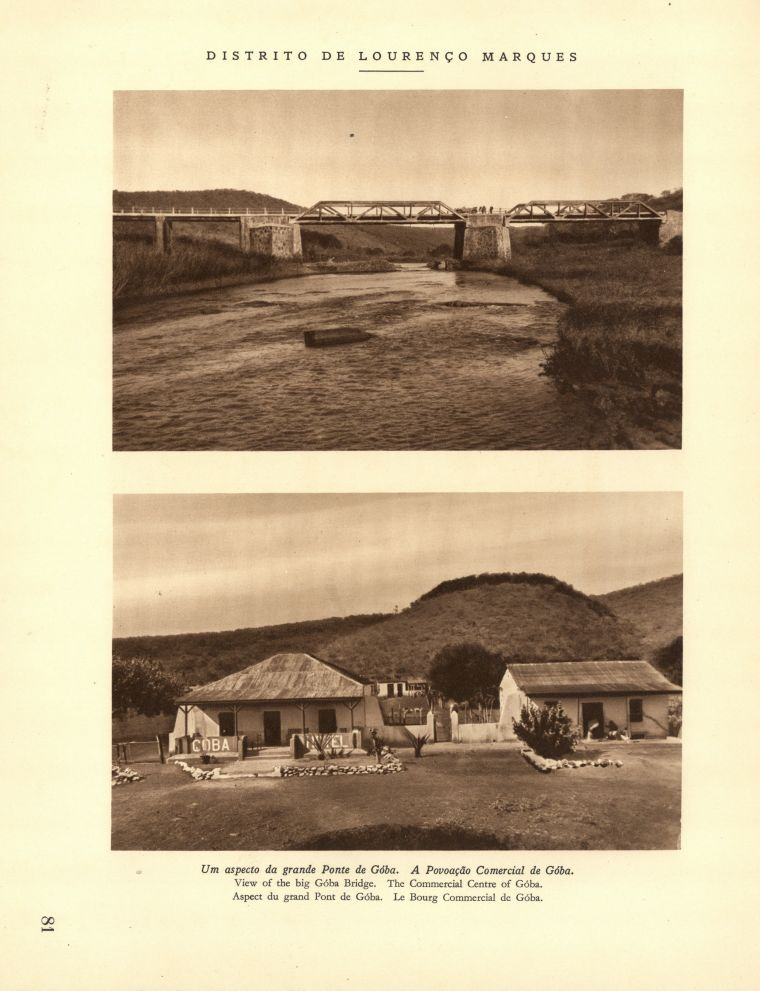
Image above: Goba railroad bridge, in 1929; image below: aspect of the Goba train station, in 1929.

In 1902, the British administration of Eswatini signed a term of commitment with the Portuguese administration of Mozambique for the construction of a railway line that would depart from the port of Maputo, reaching Mbabane. The works started in 1903, but the Mozambican stretch until Goba was only opened in 1912. After reaching the border, the railroad did not go into the interior of the Eswatini, with the works paralyzing.

In 1927, the Zululand railway (current Richards Bay railway), in the South African Union, reached Golela, on the southern border of Eswatini, but still did not reach the Swazi interior lands. The development of the Ngwenya Mine in the 1960s gave new impetus to the construction of railways at Eswatini. Between 1961 and 1964, the east–west line was built from Goba to Matsapha and then to Ngwenya. Mining in Ngwenya ceased in 1980 and the railway section between this city and Matsapha was abandoned.

The Mozambican War of Independence and the subsequent Mozambican Civil War caused disruptions in Eswatini's port trade through Mozambique, and in 1977, the South African Railways Company agreed to build a link between the Golela train station and the stretch existing in Siphofaneni/Phuzumoya and Mpaka. This line, opened in 1978, gave Eswatini rail access to Durban and Richards Bay.

In 1986, the northern link was opened, connecting Komatipoort to Mpaka, providing a shorter and alternative route for freight and passenger traffic from Eswatini and East South Africa to the port of Richards Bay, breaking much of the traffic and cargo transported by the port of Maputo.

== Railway branches ==
The Goba railway has two important branches:

- Salamanga branch: connects the village of Boane to the village of Salamanga.
- Railway maneuvering branch of Mpaka: in the city of Mpaka.

== Railway connections ==
In Mpaka, the Goba line connects with the Komatipoort railway.

In Siphofaneni/Phuzumoya, the Goba line connects with the Richards Bay railway.

In Maputo, the Goba line connects with the Pretoria-Maputo railway and the Limpopo railway.

== Main railway stations ==
The main railway stations of the Goba railway are:

- Maputo
- Matola
- Boane
- Goba
- Mlawula
- Mpaka
- Phuzumoya/Siphofaneni
- Matsapha
