= South African Class 15AR 4-8-2 =

South African Class 15AR 4-8-2 may refer to one of the following steam locomotive classes that were reclassified to Class 15AR after being reboilered with Watson Standard no. 2A boilers:

- South African Class 15 4-8-2
- South African Class 15A 4-8-2
