= Lonhlupheko =

Community in Eswatini

- Community
- Location within Eswatini
- Coordinates: 26.400°S 31.856°E
- Country: Eswatini
- District: Lubombo
- Inkhundla: Lugongolweni
- Time zone: UTC+2:00 (SAST)

Lonhlupheko is a community in Lugongolweni inkhundla, Lubombo Region, eastern Eswatini. It is located on a major junction on the MR3 road, between Siteki and Mpaka. The area is semi-arid and vulnerable to drought.
