= Maloma =

- Town
- Interactive map of Maloma
- Coordinates: 27°01′S 31°39′E
- Country: Eswatini
- Region: Lubombo
- Time zone: UTC+2 (SAST)

Maloma is a town in south-eastern Eswatini. It lies about 15 kilometres south-west of Sithobela. It is best known as the location of the Maloma Colliery, an underground anthracite coal mine.

== Geography ==
Maloma is located in south-eastern Eswatini at an elevation of approximately 363 metres above sea level. Geographic data place the settlement at approximately 27°01′S 31°39′E in the Lubombo Region of Eswatini. The nearest towns include Sithobela to the north-east and Hlatikulu about 32 kilometres to the west, while the South African town of Pongola lies about 41 kilometres to the south.

The settlement is connected to surrounding communities by a network of regional roads. The MR14 connects the Siphofaneni–Sithobela–Maloma corridor with Nsoko, where it connects with the MR8. The MR21 branches from the Maloma area and provides a route towards Siphambanweni. The road network links communities in both the Lubombo and Shiselweni regions.

The Government of Eswatini has identified the roads around Maloma as part of the Eswatini Road Infrastructure Improvement Programme. The first phase includes upgrading sections of the MR14 and MR21 from gravel to paved-standard roads, with the stated objectives of improving regional connectivity, access to social and economic services and transport conditions.

== Maloma Colliery ==
The mine that gives the area its economic importance is Maloma Colliery, an underground anthracite operation owned and run by Maloma Colliery Limited. The colliery sits roughly 8 kilometres south-east of the Maloma settlement, about 25 kilometres west of Nsoko.

=== Ownership ===
Tibiyo TakaNgwane and the Government of Eswatini have held a 50% majority shareholding in the company since its early years, and have partnered with a succession of commercial shareholders over time. These have included:

- Carbonex (1991)
- Koch Industries (1996)
- Xstrata Alloys (2001)
- Chancellor House Holdings (2010)

In December 2020, it was announced that Mine-X, a company led by entrepreneur Michello Shakantu, had acquired the commercial stake, making the colliery 100 percent Eswatini-owned for the first time in 28 years. Shakantu serves as the company's Executive Chairman.

As of the most recent information available, Mine-X holds 50 percent of the colliery. Tibiyo TakaNgwane holds a further 25 percent in trust, and the remaining 25 percent is held by the Government of Eswatini through the Ministry of Natural Resources and Energy.

=== Production and expansion ===
Global Energy Monitor records that the colliery had an annual capacity of 310,000 tonnes of anthracite in 2002. Its coal is used mainly by the steel and metallurgical industries in neighbouring South Africa.

In March 2024, the company invested E700 million over 18 months in modernising the mine, including a new shaft opened by King Mswati III, which was said to extend the mine's expected life from three years to twenty. The mine has proven reserves of 19 million saleable tonnes and a workforce that had grown from about 500 in 2021 to over 1,000 in 2024. The company's chief executive is Jabulile Shabangu.

== See also ==
- Mining industry of Eswatini
