= Lomahasha Mahlalela =

Swazi chief

- Born: c. 1825; Eswatini
- Died: 1892; Lomahasha, Eswatini
- Burial place: Lomahasha
- Occupations: Chief, warrior
- Title: Chief of the Mahlalela
- Children: Mbhudula
- Father: Makhuneni Mahlalela

Lomahasha Mahlalela (sometimes Nomahasha, also known as Lomahasha kaMakhuneni; born c. 1825 – died 1892), was a 19th-century Swazi chief and warrior. He led the Mahlalela clan in the northern part of the Lubombo region in Eswatini as a chief and served as military man during the reigns of King Mswati II and his successor, King Mbandzeni. The border town in Eswatini known as Lomahasha in the Lubombo District was named after him.

He fought in the Gaza region of present-day Mozambique during the Swazi expedition of February 1862 under the command of Sandlana Zwane against Prince Mawewe's forces when he was engaged in a succession conflict with his brother Prince Mzila. Mahlalela served as a warrior for the iNyatsi yaMswati and they defeated Mzila’s forces at Macarretane.

== Early life and background ==
Lomahasha Mahlalela was born around 1825 at Emalibeni, north of the present-day Mbabane city in Swaziland (now Eswatini) to Makhuneni Mahlalela. His son was Mbhudula.

Lomahasha is mentioned in the booklet of Bishop Nils Astrup of 1891 titled En Missionreise til Limpopo gjennem Zululand, Swaziland og Tongaland ind i Riget Umgasa ("A Missionary Journey to Limpopo through Zululand, Swaziland and Tongaland into the Kingdom of Umgasa") as one of the chiefs he met when he entered the Eswatini Kingdom in 1889.

In the 1890s, Lomahasha became involved in disputes with Portuguese colonial officials about the boundary in northeastern where he ruled as chief. On 29 August 1892, Theophilus Shepstone reported that Portuguese authorities had instructed Lomahasha to pay tax as he was living on Portuguese territory and Shepstone disputed the Portuguese claim, stating that Lomahasha was living in an area belonging to the Swazis.

This dispute formed part of the subsequent demarcation of the western Swazi-Portuguese boundary in the Lubombo range.

The border town in Eswatini known as Lomahasha in the Lubombo District was named after him. The Mahlalela traditional leadership continues through the Mlambo Traditional Council in Mbuzini, Mpumalanga.
