= Mining industry of Eswatini =

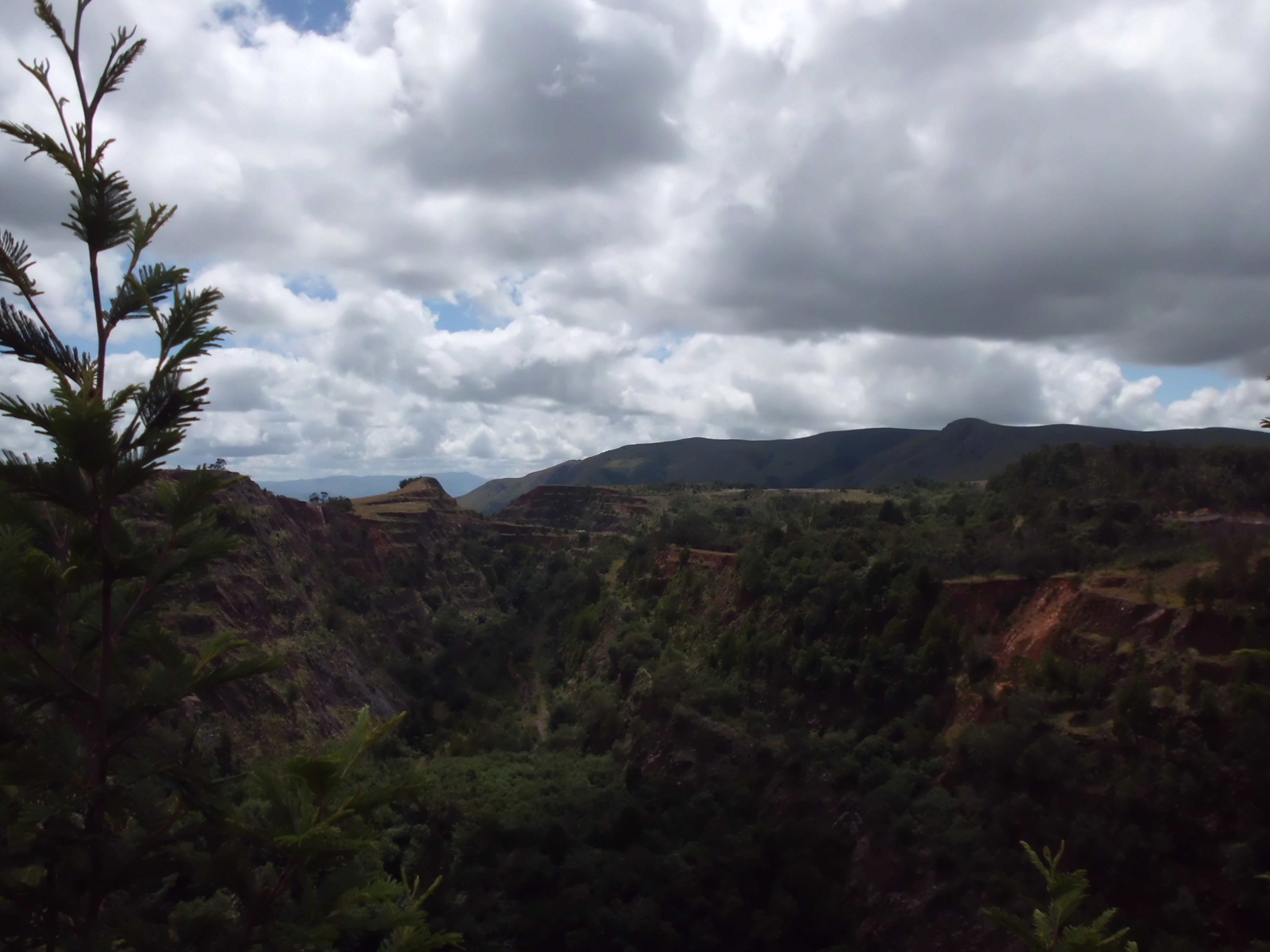
Ngwenya Mine

The mining industry of Eswatini vests with the Ngwenyama (the king) who authorizes mineral rights after due consultation with the Minerals Committee, which he appoints. Fiscal contribution from mining operations to Eswatini's GDP is 2% and also accounts for 2% of export earnings.

== History ==
The history of the mining sector of the country is ancient, traced to the iron ore mine of the western Ngwenya mountains, which has since 1975 been closed. Ngwenya Mine is said to be the oldest iron ore mine in the world, dating back more than 40,000 years. In recent years there is resurgence of this sector. In December 2023, the Geological Survey of Eswatini began the second phase of a geoscience mapping initiative in cooperation with South Africa's Council for Geoscience to improve the location and extraction of mineral resources, in particular iron ore, gold, coal, and aggregate.

== Legal framework ==
The Mining Department is responsible for the mining and minerals industry. Laws promulgated in this respect are the Mines and Minerals Act No, 4 of 2011, Diamond Act No. 3 of 2011, Explosives Act, Mines and machinery regulations, and Mines and Quarries (safety) Regulations. Additional regulations are under review.

== Production and impact ==
Important mines in the country include the Bulembu asbestos mine, the Emaswati colliery and the Dvokolwako diamond mines and quarries. While the high quality anthracite coal of the Maloma Coal mine continues to be extracted, the quality of the coal produced is eight-ash grade compared to the earlier ten-ash variety. Based on a 2011 estimate, diamond production from the Dvokolwako mine was expected to achieve a yield of 80,000 carats per year.

Asbestos production, which was exploited to a large extent, is faced with problems due to decrease in international pricing. The tailings of the Ngwenya iron ore mine (the mine itself closed in 1977) are planned to be reworked to extract 2 million metric tons of iron ore concentrate annually. Gold extractions from the northwestern region of the country have been planned, with the Piggs Peak mine getting revived. More sites have been prospected for extraction to sustain the economic development of the mining sector.

== Commodities ==
Minerals under extraction in the country include coal, diamonds, gold, kaolin and silica. Other minerals such as arsenic, copper, manganese and tin are also found but are not found economical to extract. Coal and diamonds are mined for exports while quarries cater to the local needs.

In addition to existing mining operations, soft earth minerals, including tantalum and lithium, have been located in recent mineralogical surveys which may substantially increase mining's share of the country's GDP.

== Outlook ==
The mineral industry is faced with a low level of exploration and exploitation, which is unlikely to change in the near future on account of inadequate infrastructure facilities, and also due to a high degree of HIV/AIDS among its population.
