= Eswatini in World War II =

Eswatini (known at the time as Swaziland) remained a British protectorate throughout World War II. As such, it fought alongside the Allies against the Axis. While no large scale battles or major military operations took place in or around Eswatini, the colony did supply the Allies with troops during the war. World War II was also responsible for several important domestic developments in Eswatini.

== History ==
Sobhuza II, the King of Eswatini at the time the war broke out, struck a deal with the British government, agreeing to help gather volunteers for the war effort within the country in exchange for the British allowing for greater Swazi autonomy in the future. A few thousand Swazi men ended up volunteering to fight alongside the Allies. Swazis enlisted into the African Auxiliary Pioneer Corps which went on to serve in Egypt and Libya during the Western Desert campaign, part of the larger North Africa campaign, and also participated in the Allied invasion of Italy. One notable Swazi veteran of the war is Mnikwa Dlamini, who later became the Chief of Hhelehhele.

Domestically, World War II led directly to the Swazi government's implementation of new administrative subdivisions in Eswatini called tinkhundla. Those Swazi soldiers who served in the war and had spent time in modern African port cities like Tripoli and Durban relayed their wartime experiences to King Sobhuza II and recommended to their monarch that he establish several community centers across the kingdom. These community centers, called inkhundla, eventually developed into the tinkhundla system found in Eswatini today. Swazi veterans of World War II also influenced their home country in that they eventually came to occupy several important leadership positions within the Swazi military.

The political and economic situation of the post-war world eventually allowed Eswatini to gain independence from the British Empire in 1968, as part of a much larger trend of decolonization across the world.

A memorial to Swazi soldiers who served in World War II was constructed near the mission of Bethany, located just outside of the town of Matsapha. The memorial records the names of 53 Swazi soldiers who died after returning to their home country, as well as those of 24 Swazi soldiers who died in Egypt. All Swazi soldiers not mentioned by name elsewhere are commemorated on the memorial's plaque, written in Siswati.
