= Dvokodvweni =

Coordinates: 26°25′06″S 31°53′29″E

Dvokodvweni is an inkhundla of Eswatini in the Lubombo District.

In 2019, the member of parliament (MP) from Dvokodvweni was Mdudzi Magagula.

In August 2023, the Elections and Boundaries Commission announced that Dvokodvweni inkhundla would hold by-elections after two candidates tied.

== Populated places ==
- Lonhlupheko
- Mpaka
- Malindza
