= South African Class 15A 4-8-2 =

1914 design of steam locomotive

South African Class 15A & 15AR 4-8-2
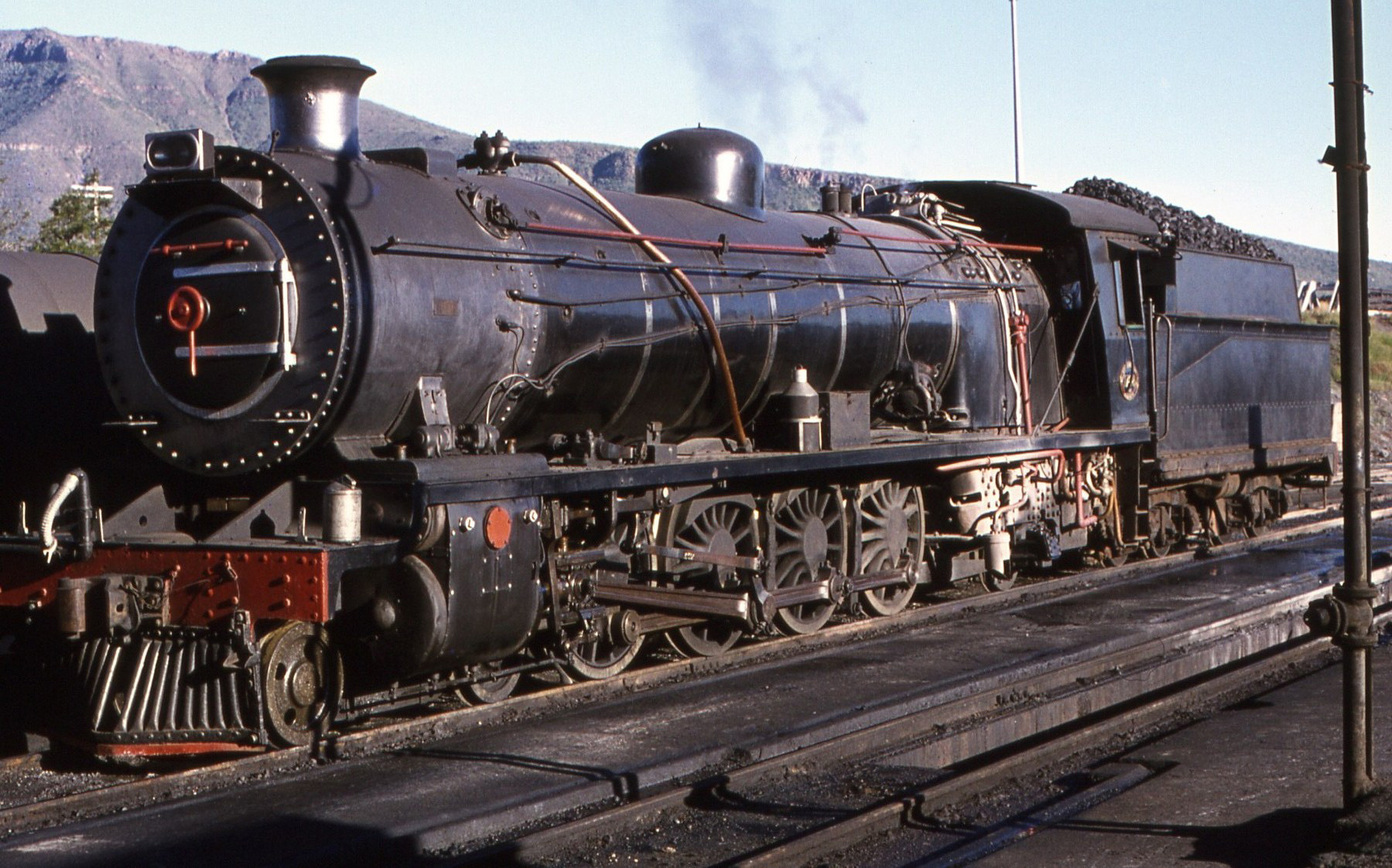
- Class 15AR 1788, Graaff Reinet, 4 April 1978
Type and origin
- ♠ Class 15A as built with a Belpaire firebox ♥ Class 15AR rebuilt with a Watson Standard boiler ♣ Steel firebox - ♦ Copper firebox
- Power type: Steam
- Designer: South African Railways
- Builder: North British Locomotive Company; Beyer, Peacock & Company; J.A. Maffei
- Serial number: NBL 20556-20560, 20843-20850, 21054-21063, 21436-21441, 21502-21505, 21718-21737, 22736-22750; BP 5955-5974, 5978-5987; Maffei 5625-5645
- Model: Class 15A
- Build date: 1914-1925
- Total produced: 119
Specifications
- Configuration
  - Whyte: 4-8-2
- Driver: 2nd coupled axle
- Gauge: 3 ft 6 in (1,067 mm) Cape gauge
- Leading dia.: 28 1/2 in (724 mm)
- Coupled dia.: 57 in (1,448 mm)
- Trailing dia.: 33 in (838 mm)
- Tender wheels: 34 in (864 mm)
- Wheelbase: 60 ft 6 3/4 in (18,459 mm)
  - Engine: 33 ft 8 in (10,262 mm)
  - Leading: 6 ft 2 in (1,880 mm)
  - Coupled: 15 ft (4,572 mm)
  - Tender: 16 ft 9 in (5,105 mm)
  - Tender bogie: 4 ft 7 in (1,397 mm)
- Length
  - Over couplers: 68 ft 11 1/8 in (21,009 mm)
- Height: ♠ 12 ft 10 in (3,912 mm) ♥ 12 ft 11 3/4 in (3,956 mm)
- Frame type: Plate
- Axle load: ♠♥♣ 16 LT 11 cwt (16,820 kg) ♥♦ 16 LT 14 cwt (16,970 kg)
  - Leading: ♠ 15 LT 14 cwt (15,950 kg) ♥♣ 16 LT 1 cwt (16,310 kg) ♥♦ 16 LT 6 cwt (16,560 kg)
  - 1st coupled: ♠♥♣ 16 LT 10 cwt (16,760 kg) ♥♦ 16 LT 13 cwt (16,920 kg)
  - 2nd coupled: ♠ 16 LT 10 cwt (16,760 kg) ♥♣ 16 LT 9 cwt (16,710 kg) ♥♦ 16 LT 6 cwt (16,560 kg)
  - 3rd coupled: ♠♥♣ 16 LT 11 cwt (16,820 kg) ♥♦ 16 LT 14 cwt (16,970 kg)
  - 4th coupled: ♠♥♣ 16 LT 9 cwt (16,710 kg) ♥♦ 16 LT 11 cwt (16,820 kg)
  - Trailing: ♠ 12 LT 6 cwt (12,500 kg) ♥♣ 12 LT (12,190 kg) ♥♦ 12 LT 7 cwt (12,550 kg)
  - Tender bogie: Bogie 1: 27 LT 10 cwt (27,940 kg); Bogie 2: 23 LT 11 cwt (23,930 kg)
  - Tender axle: 13 LT 15 cwt (13,970 kg)
- Adhesive weight: ♠ 66 LT (67,060 kg) ♥♣ 65 LT 19 cwt (67,010 kg) ♥♦ 66 LT 4 cwt (67,260 kg)
- Loco weight: ♠ 94 LT 16 cwt (96,320 kg) ♥♣ 94 LT 6 cwt (95,810 kg) ♥♦ 94 LT 17 cwt (96,370 kg)
- Tender weight: 51 LT 1 cwt (51,870 kg)
- Total weight: ♠ 145 LT 17 cwt (148,200 kg) ♥♣ 145 LT 7 cwt (147,700 kg) ♥♦ 145 LT 18 cwt (148,200 kg)
- Tender type: MP1 (2-axle bogies); MP, MP1, MR, MS, MT, MT1, MT2, MX, MY, MY1 permitted
- Fuel type: Coal
- Fuel capacity: 10 LT (10.2 t)
- Water cap.: 4,250 imp gal (19,300 L)
- Firebox
  - Type: ♠ Belpaire, combustion chamber ♥ Round-top
  - Grate area: ♠ 40 sq ft (3.7 m^{2}) ♥ 37 sq ft (3.4 m^{2})
- Boiler
  - Model: Watson Standard no. 2A
  - Pitch: ♠ 7 ft 9 in (2,362 mm) ♥ 8 ft 1/2 in (2,451 mm)
  - Diameter: ♠ 5 ft 4 5/8 in (1,641 mm) ♥ 5 ft 7 1/2 in (1,714 mm)
  - Tube plates: ♠ 19 ft (5,791 mm) ♥♣ 21 ft 8 in (6,604 mm) ♥♦ 21 ft 7 5/8 in (6,594 mm)
  - Small tubes: ♠ 113: 2 1/4 in (57 mm) ♥ 87: 2 1/2 in (64 mm)
  - Large tubes: ♠ 21: 5 1/2 in (140 mm) ♥ 30: 5 1/2 in (140 mm)
- Boiler pressure: ♠ 185 psi (1,276 kPa) ♥ 190 psi (1,310 kPa)
- Safety valve: ♠ Ramsbottom - ♥ Pop
- Heating surface
  - Firebox: ♠ 192 sq ft (17.8 m^{2}) ♥ 142 sq ft (13.2 m^{2})
  - Tubes: ♠ 1,834 sq ft (170.4 m^{2}) ♥ 2,171 sq ft (201.7 m^{2})
  - Total surface: ♠ 2,026 sq ft (188.2 m^{2}) ♥ 2,313 sq ft (214.9 m^{2})
- Superheater
  - Heating area: ♠ 478 sq ft (44.4 m^{2}) ♥ 537 sq ft (49.9 m^{2})
- Cylinders: Two
- Cylinder size: 22 in (559 mm) bore 28 in (711 mm) stroke
- Valve gear: Walschaerts
- Valve type: Poppet (No. 2100), Piston (Others)
- Couplers: Johnston link-and-pin AAR knuckle (1930s)
Performance figures
- Tractive effort: ♠ 32,990 lbf (146.7 kN) @ 75% ♥ 33,880 lbf (150.7 kN) @ 75%
Career
- Operators: South African Railways; Swaziland Railway
- Class: Class 15A & 15AR
- Number in class: 119
- Numbers: 1571-1575, 1781-1828, 1839-1858, 1961-1970, 2011-2025, 2080-2100
- Delivered: 1914-1925
- First run: 1914
- Withdrawn: 1980s
- Most leading coupled axles had flangeless wheels

The South African Railways Class 15A 4-8-2 of 1914 was a steam locomotive.

Between 1914 and 1925, the South African Railways placed 119 Class 15A steam locomotives with a 4-8-2 wheel arrangement in service, delivered in ten batches from three manufacturers.

== Manufacturers ==
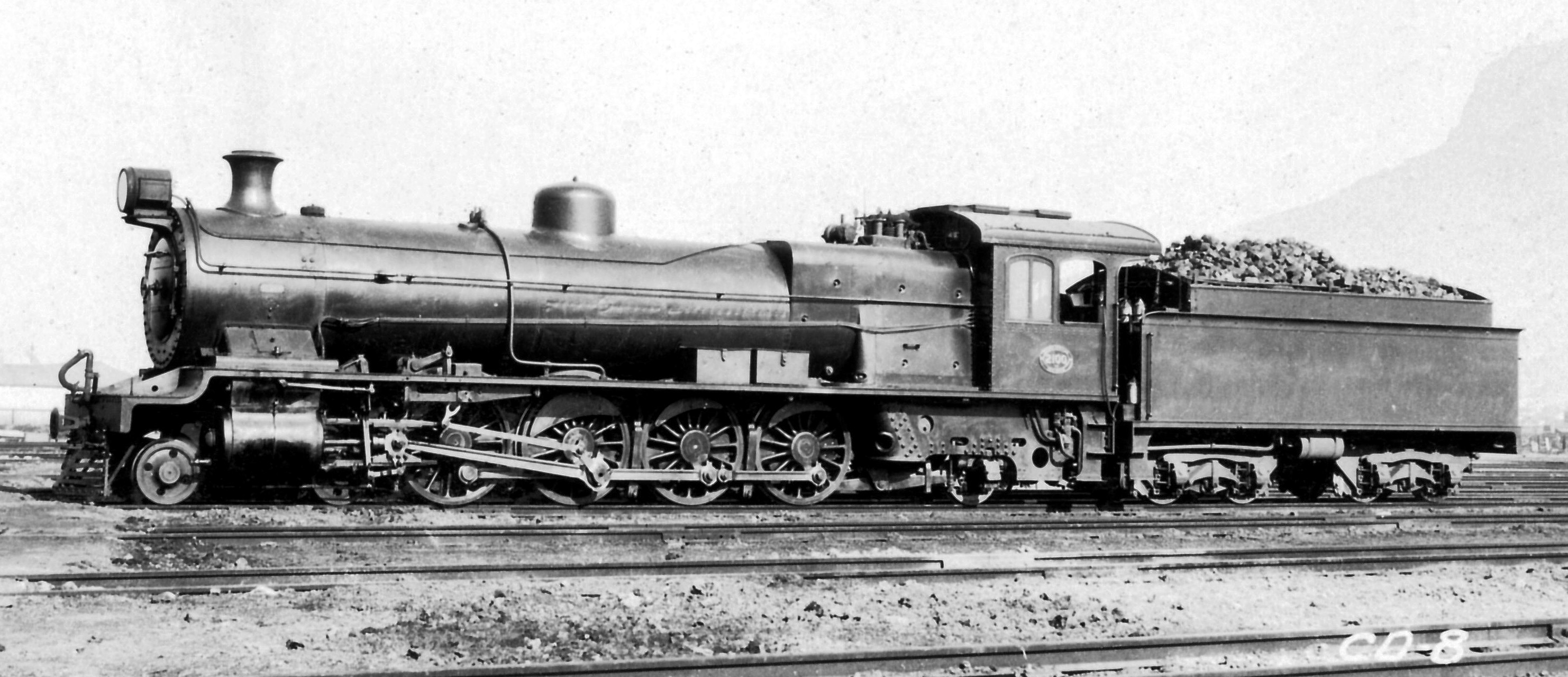
Class 15A no. 2100 (1925 Maffei with Lentz Rotary Cam Poppet valve gear) at Paardeneiland, c. 1930

The Classes 15 and 15A were the final development of the plate-framed 4-8-2 Mountain locomotive designed by D.A. Hendrie, Chief Mechanical Engineer (CME) of the South African Railways (SAR) from 1910 to 1922. Of the whole Hendrie Mountain family, the Class 15A was the most numerous and proved to be his most useful.

The predecessor Class 15 locomotives had one flaw, their excessively long fire tubes. When more locomotives of the type were ordered, Hendrie improved the boiler by adding a combustion chamber in the firebox, which shortened the distance between tube plates from 21 feet 9 inches (6,629 millimetres) to 19 feet (5,791 millimetres). When the first five of these redesigned locomotives were delivered in 1914, they were designated Class 15A. Altogether 119 were ultimately built in ten batches by three manufacturers. Being wartime, initial production and delivery occurred in dribs and drabs.

- Five were delivered by the North British Locomotive Company (NBL) in July 1914, numbered in the range from 1571 to 1575.
- Eight more were delivered by NBL, also in 1914, numbered in the range from 1781 to 1788. Like the Class 15, these first thirteen locomotives had narrow cabs, rear end running boards which curved down below their cabs and Belpaire fireboxes, but unlike the Class 15, the firebox had a combustion chamber.
- Ten more were delivered by NBL in 1915, numbered in the range from 1789 to 1798. While the first two batches were delivered with all coupled wheels flanged, beginning with this third batch the leading coupled wheels were flangeless to cope with the sharp curves on the Hex River Pass. These and subsequent locomotives had rear end running boards which continued straight through underneath their cabs.
- Six more were delivered by NBL in 1916, numbered in the range from 1799 to 1804.
- Four more were delivered by NBL in 1917, numbered in the range from 1805 to 1808.
- Twenty more were delivered by NBL in 1920, numbered in the range from 1809 to 1828. These twenty and all subsequent Class 15A locomotives were delivered with wider cabs.
- Twenty were delivered by Beyer, Peacock & Company in 1920, numbered in the range from 1839 to 1858.
- Ten more were delivered by Beyer, Peacock in 1921, numbered in the range from 1961 to 1970.
- Fifteen were delivered by NBL in 1921, numbered in the range from 2011 to 2025.
- Twenty-one were delivered by J.A. Maffei in 1925, numbered in the range from 2080 to 2100.

== Characteristics ==
The locomotives had 1 1/4 inches (32 millimetres) thick plate frames and piston valves, actuated by Walschaerts valve gear.

=== Firebox ===
To reduce the weight on the trailing wheels, steel fireboxes were originally used instead of copper. Some locomotives in Natal had been fitted with steel fireboxes years previously and the results were fairly good, but wherever water supplies were of poor quality, steel fireboxes gave a lot of trouble and necessitated the introduction of water treatment plants to prevent corrosion. This reintroduction of steel fireboxes eventually led to its widespread use on all the larger locomotive types, but it also forced the SAR to adopt locomotive water treatment as a general policy.

The first five locomotives of 1914 were delivered with steel fireboxes. In the case of the Classes 15 and 15A, it was still early days for water treatment and enough trouble was experienced to result in their steel fireboxes being replaced with copper fireboxes. Hendrie followed a conservative policy in this respect and the majority of the rest of the Class 15A fleet were originally fitted with copper fireboxes. Steel fireboxes were only to be fitted in large numbers by his successor, Colonel F.R. Collins DSO, and only the last batch of 1925, supplied by Maffei, were delivered with steel fireboxes.

=== Valve gear experiment ===
The last Class 15A locomotive, Maffei-built no. 2100, was fitted with Lentz Rotary Cam Poppet valve gear as an experiment, but this was later replaced with Walschaerts valve gear and piston-valve cylinders, thereby turning no. 2100 into a standard Class 15A.

== Watson Standard boilers ==
During the 1930s, many serving locomotives were reboilered with a standard boiler type designed by A.G. Watson, CME of the SAR from 1929 to 1936, as part of his standardisation policy. Such Watson Standard reboilered locomotives were reclassified by adding an "R" suffix to their classification.

When Class 15A locomotives were reboilered with Watson Standard no. 2A boilers, they were therefore reclassified to Class 15AR. Early conversions were equipped with copper and later conversions with steel fireboxes. In the process, they were also equipped with Watson cabs with their distinctive slanted fronts, compared to the conventional vertical fronts of their original cabs, while the cab platform was extended over the front end of the tender underframe. Many of the reboilered engines were later fitted with Type MR or Type MT tenders.

Since the only difference between the as-delivered Class 15 and Class 15A lay in the length of their boilers and whether they were built with or without combustion chambers, both models were reclassified to Class 15AR when they were reboilered with Watson Standard boilers. In the case of the Class 15A engines, reboilering replaced their combustion-chambered Belpaire boilers with less efficient Watson Standard boilers without combustion chambers and it was found that the rebuilds were inferior steamers compared with their non-rebuilt sister engines.

Their original Belpaire boilers were fitted with Ramsbottom safety valves, while the Watson Standard boiler was fitted with Pop safety valves. Another obvious difference between an original and a Watson Standard reboilered locomotive is usually a rectangular regulator cover, just to the rear of the chimney on the reboilered locomotive. In the case of the Class 15A and Class 15AR, two even more obvious differences are the Watson cab and the absence of the Belpaire firebox hump between the cab and boiler on the reboilered locomotives. In addition, during reboilering the early Class 15A models with curved down rear end running boards and narrow cabs were altered to straight rear end running boards with Watson cabs.

== Service ==
The Class 15A, one of the best classes of mainline mixed traffic locomotives to see service in South Africa, was placed in service on the Cape mainline to Kimberley where they formed the mainstay of motive power for many years. The engine was a good utility type and gave a good account of itself on goods and passenger working alike. It is noted for reducing the running time of the Union Limited by 2½ hours in March 1922. When they were superseded on this section by more powerful types, they ended up working in all parts of the country and proved to be reliable, free-steaming locomotives which ran up high mileage figures between major overhauls.

As the reboilered Class 15AR, many ended up working in the Eastern Transvaal around Waterval Boven, in the Western Transvaal, Eastern Cape and the Orange Free State. During the 1960s, many were transferred to the Cape Midland and used mainly on the section from Port Elizabeth to Klipplaat and in passenger service on the Uitenhage suburban.

Near the end of their service lives in the early 1980s, they were all relegated to shunting work at centres all around the country, except for some which were hired out to Swaziland and which were still employed in mainline service on the Swaziland Railway until they were eventually replaced by diesel traction and retired. By the time they were withdrawn after more than sixty years in service, many of these locomotives had completed three million miles of heavy-duty mainline work.

== Works numbers ==
The table lists the Class 15A engine numbers, builders, years built, works numbers and eventual classifications.

Class 15A 4-8-2 Builders & Works Numbers
SAR no.	Builder	Year	Works no.	Class
1571	NBL	1914	20556	15AR
1572	NBL	1914	20557	15AR
1573	NBL	1914	20558	15AR
1574	NBL	1914	20559	15AR
1575	NBL	1914	20560	15AR
1781	NBL	1914	20843	15AR
1782	NBL	1914	20844	15AR
1783	NBL	1914	20845	15AR
1784	NBL	1914	20846	15AR
1785	NBL	1914	20847	15AR
1786	NBL	1914	20848	15AR
1787	NBL	1914	20849	15AR
1788	NBL	1914	20850	15AR
1789	NBL	1915	21054	15AR
1790	NBL	1915	21055	15AR
1791	NBL	1915	21056	15A
1792	NBL	1915	21057	15AR
1793	NBL	1915	21058	15AR
1794	NBL	1915	21059	15AR
1795	NBL	1915	21060	15AR
1796	NBL	1915	21061	15AR
1797	NBL	1915	21062	15AR
1798	NBL	1915	21063	15AR
1799	NBL	1916	21436	15AR
1800	NBL	1916	21437	15AR
1801	NBL	1916	21438	15AR
1802	NBL	1916	21439	15AR
1803	NBL	1916	21440	15AR
1804	NBL	1916	21441	15AR
1805	NBL	1917	21502	15AR
1806	NBL	1917	21503	15AR
1807	NBL	1917	21504	15AR
1808	NBL	1917	21505	15AR
1809	NBL	1919	21718	15AR
1810	NBL	1919	21719	15AR
1811	NBL	1919	21720	15AR
1812	NBL	1919	21721	15AR
1813	NBL	1919	21722	15AR
1814	NBL	1919	21723	15AR
1815	NBL	1919	21724	15AR
1816	NBL	1919	21725	15AR
1817	NBL	1919	21726	15AR
1818	NBL	1919	21727	15AR
1819	NBL	1919	21728	15AR
1820	NBL	1919	21729	15AR
1821	NBL	1919	21730	15AR
1822	NBL	1919	21731	15AR
1823	NBL	1919	21732	15AR
1824	NBL	1919	21733	15A
1825	NBL	1919	21734	15AR
1826	NBL	1919	21735	15AR
1827	NBL	1919	21736	15AR
1828	NBL	1919	21737	15AR
1839	BP	1920	5955	15AR
1840	BP	1920	5956	15AR
1841	BP	1920	5957	15AR
1842	BP	1920	5958	15AR
1843	BP	1920	5959	15AR
1844	BP	1920	5960	15AR
1845	BP	1920	5961	15A
1846	BP	1920	5962	15AR
1847	BP	1920	5963	15AR
1848	BP	1920	5964	15AR
1849	BP	1920	5965	15AR
1850	BP	1920	5966	15AR
1851	BP	1920	5967	15A
1852	BP	1920	5968	15AR
1853	BP	1920	5969	15AR
1854	BP	1920	5970	15AR
1855	BP	1920	5971	15AR
1856	BP	1920	5972	15AR
1857	BP	1920	5973	15AR
1858	BP	1920	5974	15AR
1961	BP	1921	5978	15AR
1962	BP	1921	5979	15AR
1963	BP	1921	5980	15AR
1964	BP	1921	5981	15AR
1965	BP	1921	5982	15AR
1966	BP	1921	5983	15AR
1967	BP	1921	5984	15AR
1968	BP	1921	5985	15AR
1969	BP	1921	5986	15AR
1970	BP	1921	5987	15A
2011	NBL	1921	22736	15AR
2012	NBL	1921	22737	15AR
2013	NBL	1921	22738	15AR
2014	NBL	1921	22739	15AR
2015	NBL	1921	22740	15AR
2016	NBL	1921	22741	15AR
2017	NBL	1921	22742	15AR
2018	NBL	1921	22743	15AR
2019	NBL	1921	22744	15AR
2020	NBL	1921	22745	15AR
2021	NBL	1921	22746	15AR
2022	NBL	1921	22747	15AR
2023	NBL	1921	22748	15AR
2024	NBL	1921	22749	15AR
2025	NBL	1921	22750	15AR
2080	Maffei	1925	5625	15AR
2081	Maffei	1925	5626	15AR
2082	Maffei	1925	5627	15AR
2083	Maffei	1925	5628	15AR
2084	Maffei	1925	5629	15AR
2085	Maffei	1925	5630	15AR
2086	Maffei	1925	5631	15AR
2087	Maffei	1925	5632	15AR
2088	Maffei	1925	5633	15AR
2089	Maffei	1925	5634	15AR
2090	Maffei	1925	5635	15AR
2091	Maffei	1925	5636	15AR
2092	Maffei	1925	5637	15AR
2093	Maffei	1925	5638	15AR
2094	Maffei	1925	5639	15AR
2095	Maffei	1925	5640	15AR
2096	Maffei	1925	5641	15AR
2097	Maffei	1925	5642	15AR
2098	Maffei	1925	5643	15AR
2099	Maffei	1925	5644	15AR
2100	Maffei	1925	5645	15AR

== Preservation ==
Number	Works number	THF / Private	Leaselend / Owner	Current Location
1791		THF		Bloemfontein Locomotive Depot
1970		Private	Greg Mc.Lennan	Epping, Cape Town
1798		THF		Queenstown Locomotive Depot
1820	BP 6884	THF		Krugersdorp Locomotive Depot
1840		THF		Klipplaat Locomotive Depot
1850		THF		Bloemfontein Locomotive Depot
1963			Railway Society of South Africa	
1966		THF		Queenstown Locomotive Depot
2012		THF		Queenstown Locomotive Depot
2016		Private	Municipality	Queenstown Casino
2093		THF		Queenstown Locomotive Depot
2100		THF		Queenstown Locomotive Depot
