= Lubombo =

Lubombo may refer to:

- Lubombo District, Eswatini
- Lubombo Mountains, Southern Africa
