= Kavuma =

Kavuma is a surname. Notable people with the surname include:

- Ali Kavuma (born 1967), Ugandan weightlifter
- Catherine Samali Kavuma (born 1960), Ugandan novelist
- Grace Kavuma, Ugandan businessman
- Habib Kavuma (born 1991), Ugandan footballer
- Joyce Kavuma, is a Ugandan lawyer
- Nvumetta Ruth Kavuma, Ugandan politician
- Paulo Kavuma (1901–1989), Ugandan politician
- Richard M Kavuma, Ugandan journalist
- Sam Kavuma, Ugandan military officer
- Steven Kavuma, Ugandan judge
