= Lothair, Mpumalanga =

Lothair
- Location within Mpumalanga Location within South Africa
- Coordinates: 26.383333°S 30.433333°E
- Country: South Africa
- Province: Mpumalanga
- District: Gert Sibande
- Municipality: Msukaligwa

Area
  - Total: 4.28 km^{2} (1.65 sq mi)

Population (2011)
  - Total: 6,099
  - Density: 1,420/km^{2} (3,690/sq mi)

Racial makeup (2011)
  - Black African: 96.4%
  - Coloured: 1.2%
  - Indian/Asian: 0.4%
  - White: 1.2%
  - Other: 0.7%

First languages (2011)
  - Zulu: 74.7%
  - Swazi: 17.9%
  - Afrikaans: 1.6%
  - English: 1.2%
  - Other: 4.5%
- Time zone: UTC+2 (SAST)
- Postal code (street): 2370
- PO box: 2370
- Area code: 017

Lothair is a village located 65 kilometres (40 mi) northeast of Ermelo and 29 kilometres (18 mi) southeast of Chrissiesmeer, in the Msukaligwa Local Municipality in the Mpumalanga province of South Africa. Situated on the Bonny Brook in an area settled by Scottish immigrants, it was surveyed in 1878 and named after Lothair, the novel written by Benjamin Disraeli and published in 1870.

Lothair is at the end of a railway line from Ermelo; the Swazilink project aims to connect this line to the Eswatini Railways network at Sidvokodvo in Eswatini.

It houses a small community that depends on working on the farms for a living.
