= Sand River Dam =

Reservoir in Lubombo District, Eswatini

Coordinates: 25.992°S 31.704°E

Sand River Dam is an artificial reservoir found in the Lubombo District in Eswatini. Covering an area of 768 hectares, it is an important site for waterfowl and other waterbirds, and has been recognised as a wetland of international importance under the Ramsar Convention.
