= 11 SAI =

South African Army motorised infantry unit

11 South African Infantry Battalion
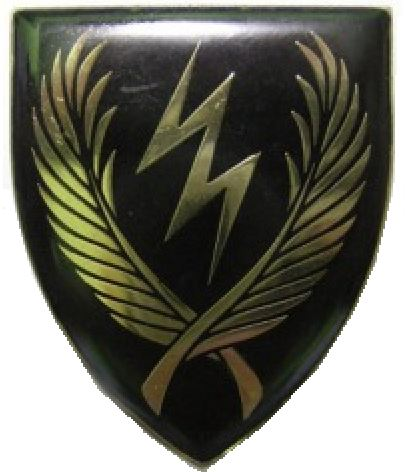
- 11 SAI emblem
- Country: South Africa
- Branch: South African Army
- Type: Motorised infantry
- Part of: South African Army Infantry Formation
- Garrison/HQ: Jozini, KwaZulu-Natal
- Motto(s): Celeri Igtu Fuminis
- Equipment: Mamba APC
- Engagements: South African Border War

Insignia
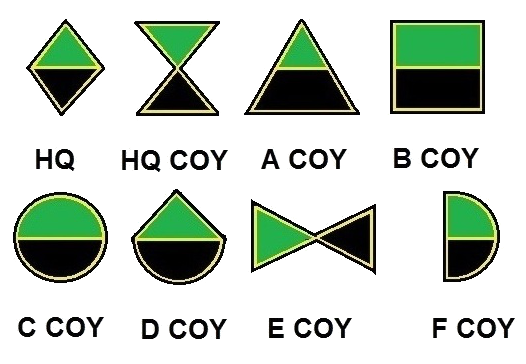
- Company level insignia

- SA Motorised Infantry beret bar circa 1992: SA Motorised Infantry beret bar

11 South African Infantry Battalion was a motorised infantry unit of the South African Army. Infantry men are soldiers who are specifically trained for the role of fighting on foot, historically this infantry has provided the most among of casualties during war.

== History ==
=== Border protection and localised training ===
11 SA infantry Battalion, was a border protection unit responsible for the area around Pongola to Kosi mouth including the Makhatini Flats.

The unit was established originally as a base to demonstrate presence in the area. It was originally a section of the Natal Command Training Wing. One of its original purposes was to conduct training in counter insurgency for local commando units. It had no permanent troops only a Headquarters units, a signal troop, a log component with its own base below the dam, MP station and a sick bay. Troops from other units were deployed here for border control units.

Satellite Bases:

- Pongola Comdo Base responsible for Swaziland border west and south.
- Ndumu Base East Swaziland Border, Mozambique border to the sea
- Jozini Base main base with living quarter (tents for one coy).

=== Zulu recruits ===
By 1973, 73 Zulu speaking troops were recruited and trained at the base. The base was also tasked to plant sisal along the South African (Natal)- Mozambique border in an attempt to curtail illegal border crossings.

=== Operations ===
By 1980, the base became the HQ of the Northern Natal Military operational area and the first illustrated flash was issued.

By 1981 the unit was deployed to assist the government with the containment of a cholera epidemic.

In 1984 the unit was involved in humanitarian operation in the wake of Cyclone Demoina.

In 1991, the unit was instructed to establish a border post at Golela.

In April 1994, the base was used as a voting station in the first fully democratic national elections. Vote counting was done by the officers and senior non-commissioned offices, for the region. Officer in command at the time was Lt Col. Leon Jacobs.

In 1995, the unit hosted the Army Command strategic planning round, led by Gen. George Meiring (Chief of the SANDF) and Lt Gen Reginald Otto (Chief of the Army)

=== 11 SAI ===
In June 1993, the units status was officially changed to 11 SAI, while another border post was opened at Fanarella.

11 SAI received its National colours on 4 July 1992.

=== Disbandment ===
11 SAI was disbanded in 1996.

== Insignia ==
=== Dress Insignia ===
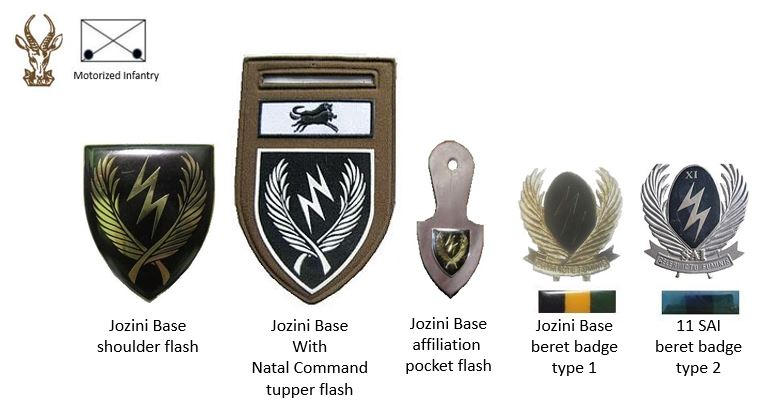
SADF era Jozini Base 11 SAI insignia
