= South African Class 15 4-8-2 =

1914 design of steam locomotive

South African Class 15 & 15AR 4-8-2
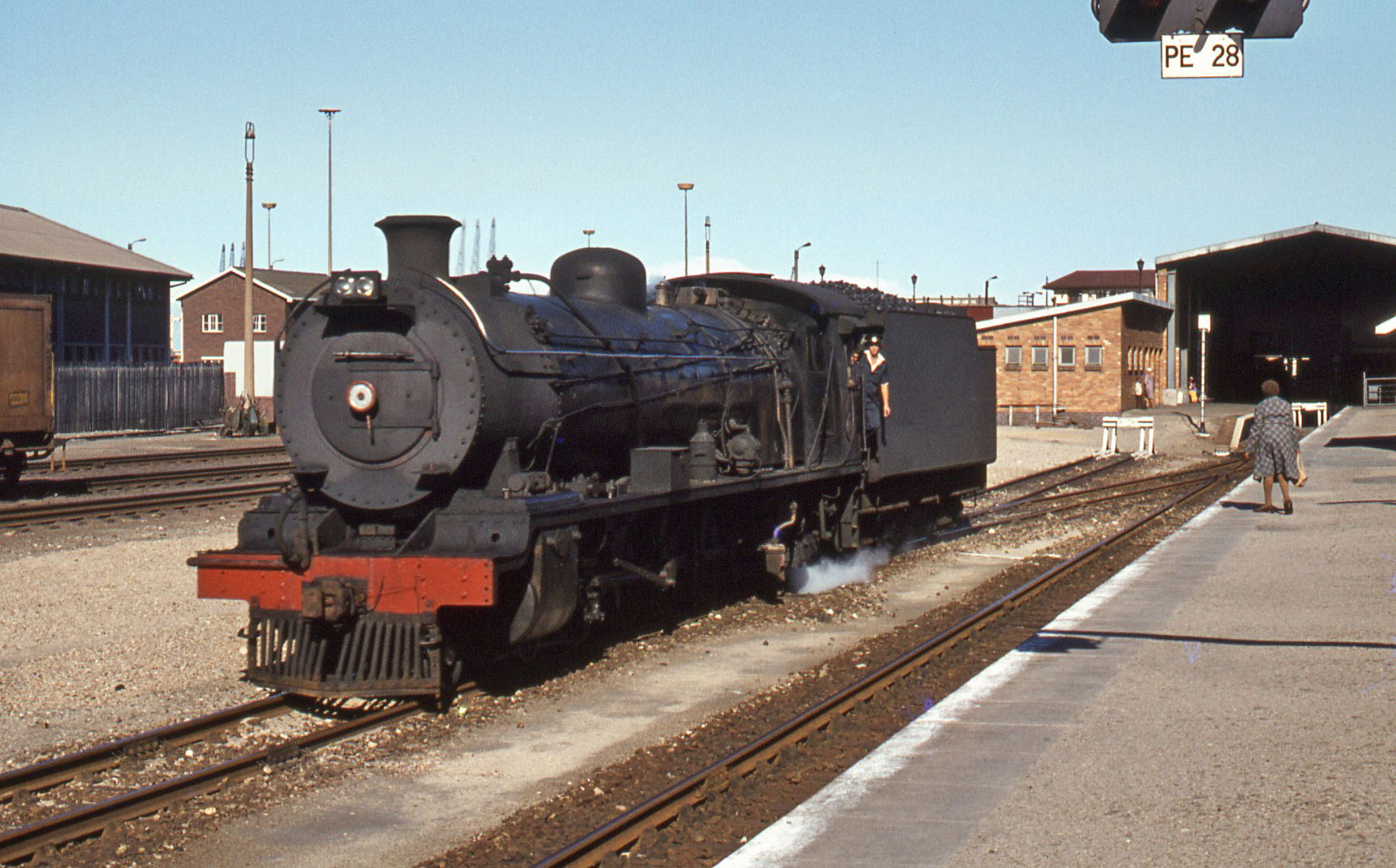
- No. 1566, reboilered and reclassified to Class 15AR, Port Elizabeth, 3 April 1978
Type and origin
- ♠ Class 15 as built with a Belpaire firebox ♥ Class 15AR rebuilt with a Watson Standard boiler ♣ Steel firebox - ♦ Copper firebox
- Power type: Steam
- Designer: South African Railways (D.A. Hendrie)
- Builder: North British Locomotive Company
- Serial number: 20364-20373
- Model: Class 15
- Build date: 1914
- Total produced: 10
Specifications
- Configuration
  - Whyte: 4-8-2 (Mountain)
  - UIC: 2'D1'h2
- Driver: 2nd coupled axle
- Gauge: 3 ft 6 in (1,067 mm) Cape gauge
- Leading dia.: 28 1/2 in (724 mm)
- Coupled dia.: 57 in (1,448 mm)
- Trailing dia.: 33 in (838 mm)
- Tender wheels: 34 in (864 mm)
- Wheelbase: 60 ft 6 in (18,440 mm)
  - Engine: 33 ft 8 in (10,262 mm)
  - Leading: 6 ft 2 in (1,880 mm)
  - Coupled: 15 ft (4,572 mm)
  - Tender: 16 ft 9 in (5,105 mm)
  - Tender bogie: 4 ft 7 in (1,397 mm)
- Length
  - Over couplers: 68 ft 10 3/4 in (20,999 mm)
- Height: ♠ 12 ft 10 in (3,912 mm) ♥ 12 ft 11 3/4 in (3,956 mm)
- Frame type: Plate
- Axle load: ♠♥♣ 16 LT 11 cwt (16,820 kg) ♥♦ 16 LT 14 cwt (16,970 kg)
  - Leading: ♠ 15 LT 14 cwt (15,950 kg) ♥♣ 16 LT 1 cwt (16,310 kg) ♥♦ 16 LT 6 cwt (16,560 kg)
  - 1st coupled: ♠♥♣ 16 LT 10 cwt (16,760 kg) ♥♦ 16 LT 13 cwt (16,920 kg)
  - 2nd coupled: ♠ 16 LT 10 cwt (16,760 kg) ♥♣ 16 LT 9 cwt (16,710 kg) ♥♦ 16 LT 6 cwt (16,560 kg)
  - 3rd coupled: ♠♥♣ 16 LT 11 cwt (16,820 kg) ♥♦ 16 LT 14 cwt (16,970 kg)
  - 4th coupled: ♠♥♣ 16 LT 9 cwt (16,710 kg) ♥♦ 16 LT 11 cwt (16,820 kg)
  - Trailing: ♠♥♣ 12 LT 6 cwt (12,500 kg) ♥♦ 12 LT 7 cwt (12,550 kg)
  - Tender bogie: Bogie 1: 27 LT 10 cwt (27,940 kg); Bogie 2: 23 LT 11 cwt (23,930 kg)
  - Tender axle: 13 LT 15 cwt (13,970 kg)
- Adhesive weight: ♠ 66 LT (67,060 kg) ♥♣ 65 LT 19 cwt (67,010 kg) ♥♦ 66 LT 4 cwt (67,260 kg)
- Loco weight: ♠ 94 LT (95,510 kg) ♥♣ 94 LT 6 cwt (95,810 kg) ♥♦ 94 LT 17 cwt (96,370 kg)
- Tender weight: 51 LT 1 cwt (51,870 kg)
- Total weight: ♠ 145 LT 1 cwt (147,400 kg) ♥♣ 145 LT 7 cwt (147,700 kg) ♥♦ 145 LT 18 cwt (148,200 kg)
- Tender type: MP1 (2-axle bogies); MP, MP1, MR, MS, MT, MT1, MT2, MX, MY, MY1 permitted
- Fuel type: Coal
- Fuel capacity: 10 LT (10.2 t)
- Water cap.: 4,250 imp gal (19,300 L)
- Firebox
  - Type: ♠ Belpaire - ♥ Round-top
  - Grate area: ♠ 40 sq ft (3.7 m^{2}) ♥ 37 sq ft (3.4 m^{2})
- Boiler
  - Model: Watson Standard no. 2A
  - Pitch: ♠ 7 ft 9 in (2,362 mm) ♥ 8 ft 1/2 in (2,451 mm)
  - Diameter: ♠ 5 ft 4 5/8 in (1,641 mm) ♥ 5 ft 7 1/2 in (1,714 mm)
  - Tube plates: ♠ 21 ft 9 in (6,629 mm) ♥♣ 21 ft 8 in (6,604 mm) ♥♦ 21 ft 7 5/8 in (6,594 mm)
  - Small tubes: ♠ 131: 2 1/4 in (57 mm) ♥ 87: 2 1/2 in (64 mm)
  - Large tubes: ♠ 24: 5 1/2 in (140 mm) ♥ 30: 5 1/2 in (140 mm)
- Boiler pressure: ♠ 185 psi (1,276 kPa) ♥ 190 psi (1,310 kPa)
- Safety valve: ♠ Ramsbottom - ♥ Pop
- Heating surface
  - Firebox: ♠ 155 sq ft (14.4 m^{2}) ♥ 142 sq ft (13.2 m^{2})
  - Tubes: ♠ 2,423 sq ft (225.1 m^{2}) ♥ 2,171 sq ft (201.7 m^{2})
  - Total surface: ♠ 2,578 sq ft (239.5 m^{2}) ♥ 2,313 sq ft (214.9 m^{2})
- Superheater
  - Heating area: ♠ 601 sq ft (55.8 m^{2}) ♥ 537 sq ft (49.9 m^{2})
- Cylinders: Two
- Cylinder size: 22 in (559 mm) bore 28 in (711 mm) stroke
- Valve gear: Walschaerts
- Valve type: Piston
- Couplers: Johnston link-and-pin AAR knuckle (1930s)
Performance figures
- Tractive effort: ♠ 32,990 lbf (146.7 kN) @ 75% ♥ 33,880 lbf (150.7 kN) @ 75%
Career
- Operators: South African Railways; Swaziland Railway
- Class: Class 15 & 15AR
- Number in class: 10
- Numbers: 1561-1570
- Delivered: 1914
- First run: 1914
- Withdrawn: 1980s
- The leading coupled axle had flangeless wheels

The South African Railways Class 15 4-8-2 of 1914 was a steam locomotive.

In 1914, the South African Railways placed ten Class 15 steam locomotives with a 4-8-2 Mountain type wheel arrangement in service.

== Manufacturer ==
D.A. Hendrie, Chief Mechanical Engineer (CME) of the South African Railways (SAR), commenced with design work on the Class 15 in 1913. It was intended as a mixed-traffic locomotive for use in the Orange Free State, where gradients and curvature were less severe than on the coastal sections. The locomotive was similar in general layout to the Classes 12 and 14, but with larger 57 inches (1,448 millimetres) coupled wheels. Ten locomotives were built by the North British Locomotive Company (NBL) and delivered in February and March 1914, numbered in the range from 1561 to 1570.

== Characteristics ==
The engines had plate frames, Walschaerts valve gear, Belpaire fireboxes without combustion chambers and were superheated. They were delivered with Type MP1 tenders which had a coal capacity of 10 long tons (10.2 tonnes) and a water capacity of 4,250 imperial gallons (19,300 litres).

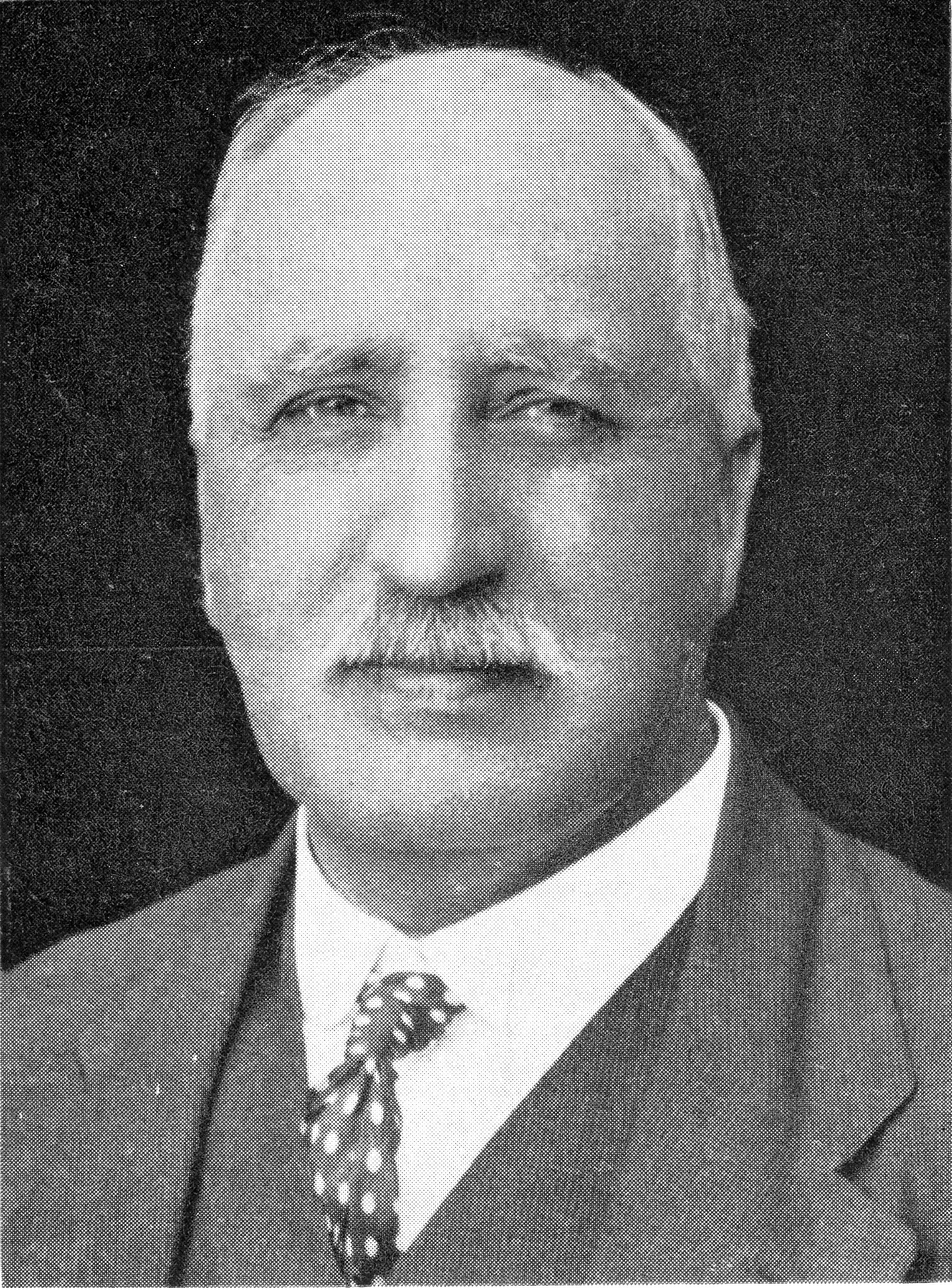
D.A. Hendrie

To reduce the weight on the trailing wheels, steel fireboxes were originally used instead of copper since the water quality in the Free State was considered suitable for this metal. Some locomotives in Natal had been fitted with steel fireboxes years previously and the results were fairly good, but wherever water supplies were of poor quality, steel fireboxes gave a lot of trouble and necessitated the introduction of water treatment plants to prevent corrosion.

This reintroduction of steel fireboxes eventually led to its widespread use on all the larger locomotive types, but it also forced the SAR to adopt locomotive water treatment as a general policy. There was no settled policy on water treatment for some years, but engines with copper fireboxes were used mainly in areas where the water was not of good quality. Hendrie followed a conservative policy in this respect and steel fireboxes were only to be fitted in large numbers by his successor, Colonel F.R. Collins DSO.

In the case of the Class 15, it was still early days for water treatment and enough trouble was experienced to result in their steel fireboxes being replaced with copper fireboxes. The locomotive's one flaw was excessively long fire tubes. On later models like the Class 15A, Hendrie improved the boiler by adding a combustion chamber, which shortened the distance between tube plates from 21 feet 9 inches (6,629 millimetres) to 19 feet (5,791 millimetres).

== Watson Standard boilers ==
During the 1930s, many serving locomotives were reboilered with a standard boiler type designed by A.G. Watson, CME of the SAR from 1929 to 1936, as part of his standardisation policy. Such Watson Standard reboilered locomotives were reclassified by adding an "R" suffix to their classification.

When all ten Class 15 locomotives were reboilered with Watson Standard no. 2A boilers, they were reclassified to Class 15AR since the only differences between the as-delivered Class 15 and the Class 15A lay in the length of their boilers and whether they were built with or without combustion chambers. In the process, the locomotives were also equipped with Watson cabs with their distinctive slanted fronts, compared to the conventional vertical fronts of their original cabs. During reboilering, some were equipped with steel and others with copper fireboxes.

Their original Belpaire boilers were fitted with Ramsbottom safety valves, while the Watson Standard boiler was fitted with Pop safety valves. Another obvious difference between an original and a Watson Standard reboilered locomotive is usually a rectangular regulator cover, just to the rear of the chimney on the reboilered locomotive. In the case of the Classes 15 and 15AR, two even more obvious differences are the Watson cab and the absence of the Belpaire firebox hump between the cab and boiler on the reboilered locomotives.

== Service ==
The Class 15 was placed in service in the Orange Free State, shedded at Bloemfontein. After reboilering and reclassification, they became part of the much larger Class 15AR fleet and saw service widely throughout the country, getting used in every kind of role from dock shunting to mainline passenger work.

The Cape Northern examples were scattered between De Aar, Kimberley and Klerksdorp. The Cape Midland was a major user of the Class, with locomotives shedded at Sydenham in Port Elizabeth, Klipplaat, Graaff Reinet and Noupoort. The Class 15AR also worked the suburban services between Port Elizabeth and Uitenhage until they were replaced by diesel power.

Near the end of their service lives in the early 1980s, they were all relegated to shunting work at centres all around the country, except for some which were hired out to Swaziland and which were still employed in mainline service on the Swaziland Railway until they were also eventually replaced by diesel traction and retired.

== Preservation ==
Number	Works nmr	THF / Private	Leaselend / Owner	Current Location	Outside South Africa	?
1791		THF		Bloemfontein Locomotive Depot		
1970		Private	Greg Mc.Lennan			
1798		THF		Queenstown Locomotive Depot		
1820		THF		Krugersdorp Locomotive Depot		
1840		THF		Klipplaat Locomotive Depot		
1850		THF		Bloemfontein Locomotive Depot		
1963		Private	Railway Society of South Africa			
1966		THF		Queenstown Locomotive Depot		
2012		THF		Queenstown Locomotive Depot		
2016		Private	Municipality	Queenstown Casino		
2093		THF		Queenstown Locomotive Depot		
2100		THF		Queenstown Locomotive Depot		

== Illustration ==
The main picture, showing the reboilered and reclassified Class 15AR no. 1566 at Port Elizabeth, and the following illustrate the Class before and after modification.

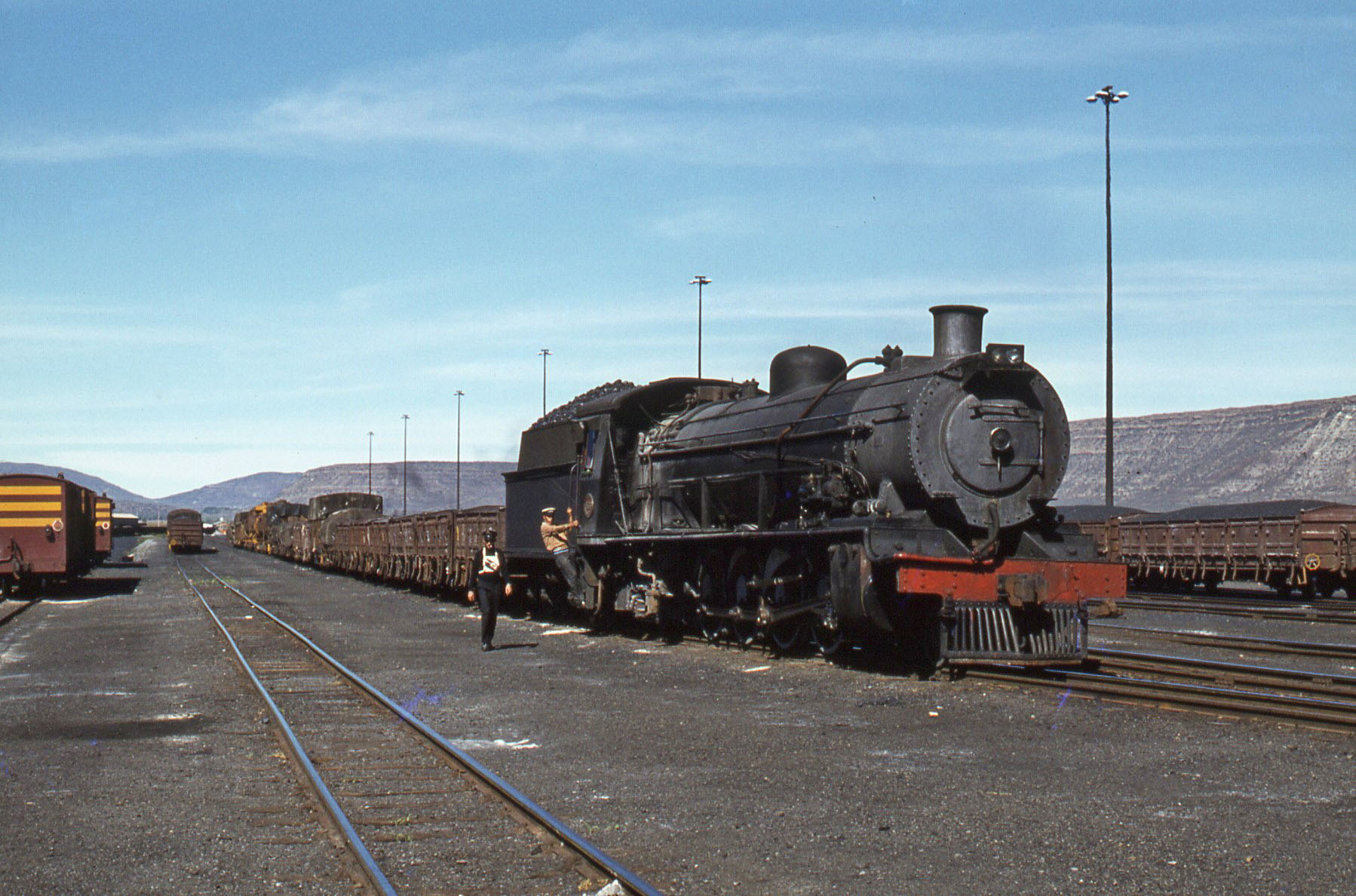
Class 15AR No. 1568 with a modified Type MP1 tender, Midlandia, 1979

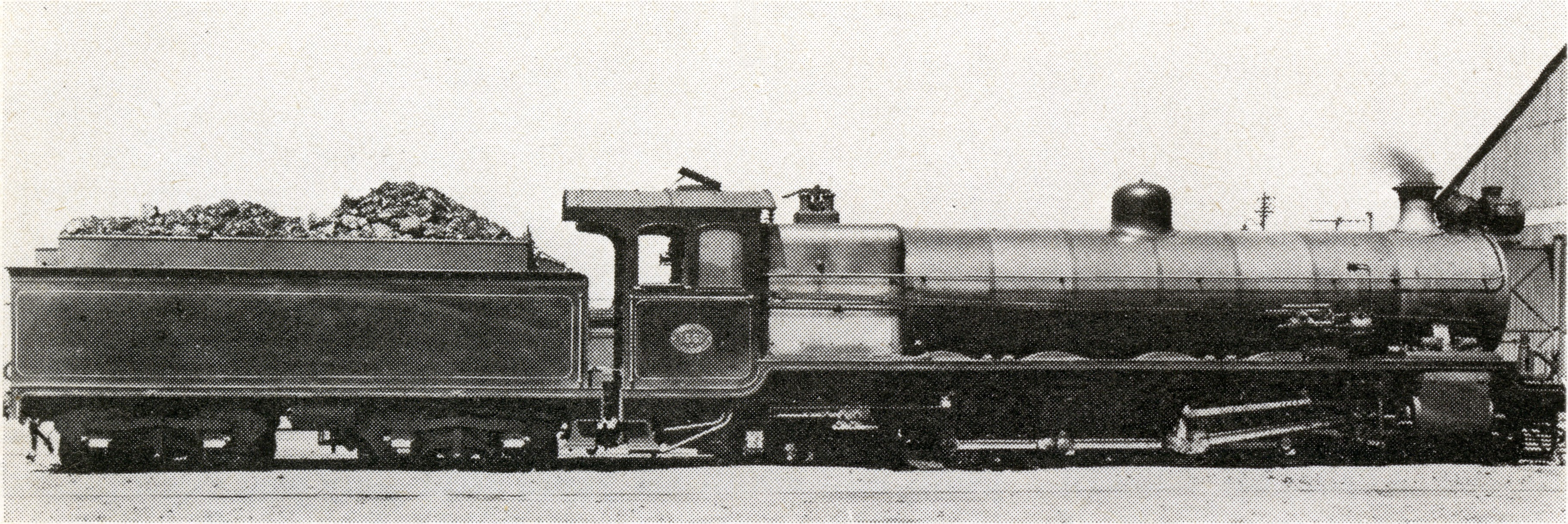
No. 1561 as built, with an as-delivered Type MP1 tender and Belpaire firebox, c. 1914
