= Salamanga =

- Town
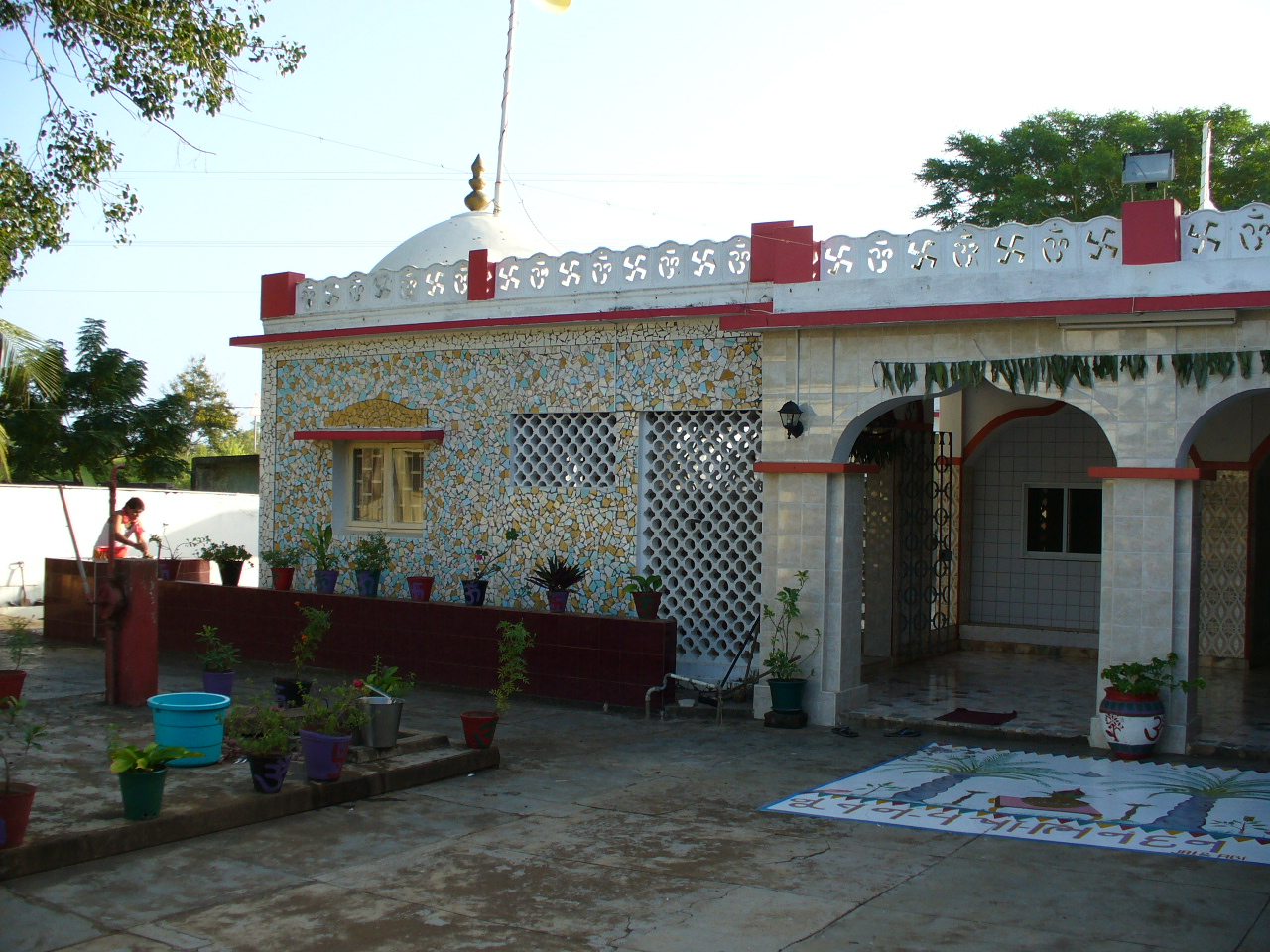
- A Hindu temple in Salamanga

- Location within Mozambique
- Coordinates: 26°28′31″S 32°38′54″E
- Country: Mozambique
- Elevation: 18 m (59 ft)

Salamanga is a town in southern Mozambique.

== Transport ==
The town is served by a terminus of a branchline of the Goba railway of the national railway network. The main traffic is limestone used in the manufacture of cement.

In 2008, $8m was to be spent rebuilding the line.

== See also ==
- Railway stations in Mozambique
