= Nkilongo =

Inkhundla of Eswatini

Coordinates: 26.821270°S 31.877609°E

Nkilongo is an inkhundla of Eswatini, located in the Lubombo District. Its population as of the 2007 census was 15,907.
