= Transnet Freight Rail =

Railway operator in South Africa

- Formerly: Spoornet
- Type: Division
- Industry: Transport; Logistics
- Predecessor: South African Railways and Harbours; Spoornet
- Founded: 2007; 19 years ago
- Headquarters: Johannesburg, Gauteng, South Africa
- Area served: South Africa; Various export markets
- Key people: Russell Baatjies (CEO)
- Services: Freight rail transport
- Revenue: ▲ R45.8 billion (2025/26)
- Owner: Government of South Africa
- Number of employees: 11,018 (2025/26)
- Parent: Transnet
- Website: transnet.net

Transnet Freight Rail (TFR) is a South African freight rail transport company, and an operating division of major state-owned transport and logistics company Transnet. Founded in 2007, the company is based in Johannesburg, Gauteng, and provides rail services to domestic and specific export markets.

As of 2026, TFR has a total of 30,400 km of track under management.

== History ==
Rail network of the Central South African Railways in 1910, immediately before the creation of the Union of South Africa

Railways were first developed in the area surrounding Cape Town and later in Durban around the 1840s. The first line opened in Durban on 27 June 1850. The initial network was created to serve the agricultural production area between Cape Town and Wellington.

The news that there were gold deposits in the Transvaal Republic moved the Cape Colony Government (supported by British Government) to link Kimberley as soon as possible by rail to Cape Town as part of the colonial dream.

The Central South African Railways (CSAR) was, from 1902 to 1910, the operator of public railways in the Transvaal Colony and Orange River Colony in what is now South Africa. During the Anglo-Boer War, as British forces moved into the territory of the Orange Free State and the South African Republic, the Orange Free State Government Railways, the Netherlands-South African Railway Company and the Pretoria-Pietersburg Railway were taken over by the Imperial Military Railways under Lieutenant-Colonel Sir Percy Girouard.

After the war had ended, the Imperial Military Railways became the Central South African Railways in July 1902, with Thomas Rees Price as general manager. With the creation of the Union of South Africa in 1910, the CSAR was merged with the Cape Government Railways and the Natal Government Railways to form the South African Railways, which is now Transnet Freight Rail.

As part of a project to reform the rail freight sector, Transnet's rail infrastructure manager responsibilities were separated from Transnet Freight Rail and placed under the control of Transnet Rail Infrastructure Manager (TIMM).

TIMM signed operating agreements in May 2026 with 11 private sector companies to access the national rail network. The selected operators are ARC South Africa, Barberry, Grindrod Rail, Interlinks, IRACEMA, Menar Ports & Rail, Minrail, Motheo Logistics, The Railway Corporation, Sharp Logistics and TLD Marine.

== Operations ==
Transnet Freight Rail is a freight logistics and passenger transport railway. It is the largest freight hauler in Africa. The company comprises several businesses:

- GFB Commercial (General Freight Business) – Transnet's largest division; handles over 50% of its freight;
- Coal Line, serving coal exporters on the Mpumalanga – Richards Bay line; second largest coal railway in the world, delivering 62 million tonnes of coal (also known as "Black Gold") in the year ending on 31 March 2010;
- Ore Export Line – dedicated to iron ore transport on the Sishen to Saldanha line;
- Luxrail – The operation of the Blue Train, which is designed as a five-star hotel on wheels.

Transnet also formerly owned Shosholoza Meyl, the non-luxury long-distance passenger rail service. Shosholoza Meyl was transferred to the Passenger Rail Agency of South Africa on 23 December 2008. A line in the Eastern Cape is leased to Kei Rail.

== Business units ==
Transnet Freight Rail is divided into 6 business units:

- Agriculture and Bulk Liquids ("ABL")
- Coal Business Unit (Coal Line)
- Intermodal (Container) and Automotive Business Unit ("CAB") (Johannesburg-Durban Line)
- Iron Ore and Manganese Business Unit (Kimberley-Port Elizabeth & Ore Export Line)
- Mineral Mining and Chrome Business Unit ("MMC") (Witbank-Komatipoort & Phalaborwa-Komatipoort Lines)
- Steel and Cement Business Unit ("SAC")

The launch of the business units took place in a company wide event for all managerial staff on 18 April 2012.

== Links to neighbouring countries ==
The South African rail network

The Transnet rail network is linked to all of South Africa's neighbouring countries:

TransNamib of Namibia, at Nakop;
Botswana Railways at Ramatlabama;
National Railways of Zimbabwe and the Beitbridge Bulawayo Railway at Beitbridge;
Mozambique Ports and Railways at Ressano Garcia;
Eswatini Railways of Eswatini at Golela and Mananga;
Maseru in Lesotho on the Maseru branch line (owned by Transnet).

== Ongoing projects ==
- Maputo Corridor: Transnet Freight Rail is developing a plan with the Railroad Development Corporation to transport magnetite from Phalaborwa to Maputo as feedstock for a proposed steel plant in Maputo.
- In May 2010, Transnet revealed a five-year-plan involving rail projects costing R52Bn. Most of this would be spent on new rolling stock, including 304 locomotives and 7,231 wagons. R4Bn would be spent on infrastructure connecting Majuba coal-fired power station with the Richards Bay freight railway.
- Transnet is upgrading the rail corridor which connect the Port of Ngqura with manganese mines around Hotazel in the Northern Cape. The corridor would be 1,003 kilometres (623 mi) long, and would mostly involve upgrades of existing lines; capacity is expected to increase from 5·5 million tonnes / year to 16 mpta.
- Swazilink is expected to connect from Lothair to Sidvokodvo in Eswatini, at a cost of R17 billion.

== Publication ==
The South African Railways & Harbours Magazine was the house organ of the SAR. Founded in April 1907 as the South African Railway Magazine, it was renamed in January 1914 after the SAR and harbours board merged to form the South African Railways & Harbours Administration. It was published monthly until March 1967.

== See also ==
- Logistics in South Africa
- Transport in South Africa
