= Disa intermedia =

Conservation status
- Vulnerable (IUCN 3.1)
- CITES Appendix II

Scientific classification
- Kingdom: Plantae
- Clade: Tracheophytes
- Clade: Angiosperms
- Clade: Monocots
- Order: Asparagales
- Family: Orchidaceae
- Subfamily: Orchidoideae
- Genus: Disa
- Species: D. intermedia

Binomial name
- Disa intermedia H.P.Linder

Species of flowering plant

Disa intermedia is a species of orchid (family Orchidaceae), native to Eswatini, formally Swaziland.

Mining operations are a threat to D. intermedia which is protected and grows exclusively in the Ngwenya Mine region (the world's oldest mine). Among many environmental issues, the mining operations have led to heavy pollution of the water sources that feed the nearby city of Mbabane. Cases of corruption to get the mining license were reported, including a $28 million donation to the king Mswati III by Salgaocar Swaziland Limited Company. The deal established a 25% ownership of the mine for the king, 25% for the government, and 50% to Salgaocar. Reports also claimed that Salgaocar was using Mozambican and South African trucks to avoid paying import taxes. 2,500 jobs were announced after the Salgaocar-Swazi deals, but the positions were never created. Salgaocar ceased its mining activities in Ngwenya in 2014. However, in January 2018, the Mineral Management Board announced it was ready to relaunch prospecting activities at the Ngwenya mine.
