= Hlane =

Inkhundla of Eswatini

Coordinates: 26.298320°S 31.874900°E

Hlane is an inkhundla of Eswatini, located in the Lubombo District. Its population as of the 2007 census was 7,091.
