= Matsapha =

Town in Eswatini

Coordinates: 26°31′00″S 31°19′00″E

Matsapha is a town in central Eswatini. The Matsapha urban boundary is defined in the Urban Government Act of 1969, as amended in 2012, and covers an area of approximately 2,000 hectares (4,900 acres). Matsapha was established as an industrial park in 1965 and was officially gazetted as an urban area in 1969. Matsapha is located in the Upper Middleveld of Eswatini in the Manzini region, which is in the centre of the country. Matsapha is 11 km (7 mi) from the city of Manzini, the country's commercial capital, and 35 km (22 mi) from Mbabane, the administrative capital of the country. It is well located as it is on Eswatini's main east–west axis between South Africa and Mozambique, 16 km (10 mi) from the junction of the Lavumisa road that leads to Durban and KwaZulu Natal. It lies at an altitude of 625 m (2,051 ft) above sea level.

== Transport ==
Matsapha is served by a railway station on the Goba railway, which connects to the city of Siphofaneni to the east.

Matsapha is also served by the Matsapha International Airport.

== Bethany ==
Bethany is a neighbourhood a few kilometres to the west of Matsapha. A memorial to Swazi soldiers who served in World War II was constructed near the mission there. The memorial records the names of 53 Swazi soldiers who died after returning to their home country, as well as those of 24 Swazi soldiers who died in Egypt. All Swazi soldiers not mentioned by name elsewhere are commemorated on the memorial's plaque, written in Siswati.
