= Matsanjeni North =

Coordinates: 26.6311°S 32.0503°E

Matsanjeni North (also known as Tikhuba) is an inkhundla of Eswatini, located in the Lubombo District. Its population at the 2007 census was 12,940.
