= Mpholonjeni =

Coordinates: 26.588921°S 31.829201°E

Mpholonjeni is an inkhundla of Eswatini, located in the Lubombo District. Its population as of the 2007 census was 20,563.
