= Lubuli =

Town in Eswatini

Coordinates: 27°01′S 31°54′E

Lubuli is a town in southeastern Eswatini (Swaziland). It is located close to the South African border just to the northwest of the town of Nsoko on the MR14 road between there and Maloma.
