= The Observer (Uganda) =

Ugandan newspaper

- Type: Weekly newspaper
- Publisher: Observer Media Limited
- Editor: Robert Spin Mukasa
- Founded: March 25, 2004
- Language: English
- Headquarters: Kampala, Uganda
- Website: http://www.observer.ug/

The Weekly Observer is a Ugandan weekly newspaper headquartered in Kamwookya, Kampala. It is one of the largest privately owned papers in the country co-founded by maverick journalist John Kevin Aliro and nine other directors In 2007, its reporter Richard M Kavuma won the CNN Multichoice African Journalist of the Year award. The newspaper was founded in 2004 and celebrated 10 years of existence in March 2014.

== See also ==
- List of newspapers in Uganda
- Media in Uganda
