= Pongola =

Pongola may refer to:

- Pongola, KwaZulu-Natal, a town in South Africa
- Pongola River, a river in South Africa
- Pongola glaciation, a glaciation period 2900 million years ago

== Other uses ==
- Pongola (thrips), a monotypic genus of thrips
