= Mahlalela =

Mahlalela is a surname. Notable people with the surname include:

- Cengi Mahlalela (1957–2000), South African politician
- Dumisa Mahlalela (fl. 1992 – d. 2012), Swazi football coach
- Fish Mahlalela (born 1962), South African politician
- Jama Mahlalela (born 1980), Swazi-Canadian basketball coach
