= Mpaka =

Town in Eswatini

Coordinates: 26.412°S 31.780°E

Mpaka is a town in eastern central Eswatini in western Lubombo District. It lies about 22 kilometres (14 mi) northwest of Siteki on the MR3 highway. It has a defunct coal mine, though some corporate entities are looking into re-starting coal production in the area which continues to be controversial.

== Transports ==
Mpaka has one of the main railway stations in the country, serving as a connection between the Goba railway (Siphofaneni-Mpaka-Mlawula) and the Komatipoort railway (Mpaka-Mananga). It is connected to the MR3 highway.
