= Lugongolweni =

Coordinates: 26.341709°S 32.008209°E

Lugongolweni is an inkhundla of Eswatini, located in the Lubombo District. Its population at the 2007 census was 15,519. It is divided into four umphakatsi, or chiefdoms: Ka-Langa, Makhewu, Mlindazwe, and Sitsatsaweni.

== Populated places ==
- Siteki
