= Richard M Kavuma =

Ugandan journalist

Richard M. Kavuma
- Born: Uganda
- Citizenship: Uganda
- Occupations: Journalist, Editor
- Employer: The Observer (Uganda)
- Notable work: Coverage of Katine project; Book: *Good Policies, Poor Policing*
- Awards: United Nations Foundation Award (2006) CNN Multichoice African Journalist of the Year (2007)

Richard M. Kavuma is a Ugandan journalist and editor with The Observer newspaper. He also writes for the London newspapers Guardian and The Observer about the Katine project in Uganda. Kavuma has won international awards including the 2006 United Nations Foundation award for Development and Humanitarian coverage and the 2007 CNN Multichoice African Journalist of the Year Award. In 2008 his award-winning articles, about Millennium Development Goals, were published into a book by the United Nations Millennium Campaign. The book, Good Policies, Poor Policing, was launched in Accra, Ghana, in July 2008. Richard M. Kavuma is the editor of The Observer newspaper a tri - weekly that publishes on Monday, Wednesday and Friday.

== Sources ==
- http://images.cnn.com/WORLD/africa/africanawards/press.july07.html
- http://www.standagainstpoverty.org/en/node/57
- guardian.co.uk
- http://cms.unca.com/content/view/6/10/
- http://www.observer.ug/index.php?option=com_content&view=article&id=2208:uganda-and-the-millennium-development-goals&catid=61:special-report&Itemid=90
