= Grace Kavuma =

- Born: Uganda
- Education: Makerere University (Bachelor of Commerce) (Master of Business Administration)
- Occupations: Accountant and business executive
- Years active: 1995 - present
- Title: chairman Capital Markets Authority of Uganda

Grace Jethro Kavuma is a businessman, accountant, and administrator in Uganda. He is the chairman of the Capital Markets Authority of Uganda.

== Background and education ==
Kavuma was born in the Central Region of Uganda. He graduated from Makerere University with a Bachelor of Commerce degree. He is a member of the Institute of Certified Public Accountants of Uganda and of the Institute of Certified Public Accountants of Kenya.

== Career ==
He previously served as the chief executive officer of Tullow Uganda Limited. He has also worked at Barclays Bank of Uganda and at DFCU Bank.

== See also ==
- Uganda Securities Exchange
