= Goba, Mozambique =

Town in Mozambique

Goba
- Town
- Location within Mozambique
- Coordinates: 26°11′59″S 32°08′18″E
- Country: Mozambique
- Province: Maputo
- Time zone: UTC+2:00 (CAT)

Goba is a small town in Mozambique. It is located in Maputo Province of southern Mozambique, near the border with Eswatini.

== Transport ==
Goba is served by a railway station on the Goba railway, which extends from Maputo into Eswatini.

== In popular culture ==
The natural landscapes around Goba were a filming location for the 2006 film Blood Diamond.

== See also ==
- Railway stations in Mozambique
