= Pongola rufianalis =

Scientific classification
- Kingdom: Animalia
- Phylum: Arthropoda
- Class: Insecta
- Order: Thysanoptera
- Family: Phlaeothripidae
- Genus: Pongola (zur Strassen, 1959)

Genus of thrips

Pongola is a monotypic genus of thrips in the family Phlaeothripidae.

== Species ==
- Pongola rufianalis
