= Phuzumoya =

Town in Eswatini

Coordinates: 26.684°S 31.745°E

Phuzumoya is a small town situated in the rural village of kaMkhweli under the chieftaincy of Mtfuso II in eastern Eswatini on the MR8 road, located close to the confluence of the Umtimphofu River and Lusutfu Rivers, some ten kilometres east of Siphofaneni. It was named after the valley Phuzumoya.

In the form Phuzamoya, the town's train station is shown in the film Wah-Wah.
