= Hhelehhele =

Coordinates: 26.488°S 31.456°E

Hhelehhele is a town in central Eswatini, ten kilometres east of Manzini.
