= Mlawula =

Village in east Eswatini

Coordinates: 26°11′00″S 31°59′00″E

Mlawula is a village an east Eswatini, near the border with Mozambique.

== Transport ==
It has a railway station, which serves as a checkpoint and border crossing for the Goba railway.
