= Lomahasha =

Sub-division in the Lubombo District, Eswatini

- Inkhundla
- Location within Eswatini
- Coordinates: 25°59′S 32°00′E
- Country: Eswatini
- District: Lubombo

Population (2007)
  - Total: 22,239
- Time zone: UTC+2:00 (SAST)

Lomahasha is an inkhundla of Eswatini, located in the Lubombo District. Its population as of the 2007 census was 22,239.
