= Sithobela =

Coordinates: 26.8794°S 31.5938°E

Sithobela is a town in southern central Eswatini about 160 kilometres directly south of the capital Mbabane.
