= Siphofaneni =

Town in Eswatini

Coordinates: 26°41′S 31°41′E

Siphofaneni is a town in the Lubombo Region of central Eswatini (Swaziland), 45 kilometres from Manzini and 20 kilometres from Big Bend, a major sugarcane-producing town on the main highway leading to Durban. It has a tropical climate, very hot during summer and cold in winter. Malaria is endemic in Lubombo. Siphofaneni has hot springs and is surrounded by several sugarcane farms. It is located on the banks of the largest river in Swaziland, the Usutu.

== Transports ==
Siphofaneni has one of the main railway stations in the country, serving as a connection between the Goba railway (Matsapha-Siphofaneni-Mpaka) and the Richards Bay railway (Siphofaneni-Lavumisa).

Goods trains of the Eswatini Railways pass through the town.
