= Golela =

- Location within Eswatini Location within South Africa
- Coordinates: 27.3183°S 31.8913°E
- Country: South Africa; Eswatini
- Province: (Kwa-Zulu Natal) KwaZulu-Natal
- District: Zululand
- Municipality: uPhongolo
- Region: (Eswatini) Shiselweni
- Time zone: UTC+2 (SAST)
- Postal code (street): 3990
- Area code: 034

Golela is a border town straddling both Kwa-Zulu Natal Province, South Africa and Eswatini, east of Pongola and south of Lavumisa. The Golela border post was recently rebuilt to meet the increasing movement of people and goods between South Africa and Eswatini.

== Overview ==
The border crossing is situated on the southern border of Eswatini, 145 km southeast of Piet Retief. The name is of Zulu origin, said to be named after Golela kaMantsholo Thabede who was a noble man of the Mahlalela clan who were living along uPhongolo river, below Ubombo mountains. Locals say that Golela used to confront the apartheid government authorities who were stationed at the border and was opposed to the border restrictions by the apartheid government of Transvaal. Before it was constructed by the Transvaal government, the border was long used by people many years ago before the arrival of European settlers. This was the hunting ground of the Mahlalela clan in former times. They would organize hunting expeditions and invite the neighboring Ntshangase, Nyawo, Mngomezulu and Buthelezi clans. Other hunters would come even as far as Zombodze in Eswatini. The portion of the town across the border, in Eswatini, was renamed Lavumisa.

== Transport ==
It is served by a railway station on the line connecting South Africa and Eswatini.
