= Ngwenya Mine =

Ancient mine in Eswatini

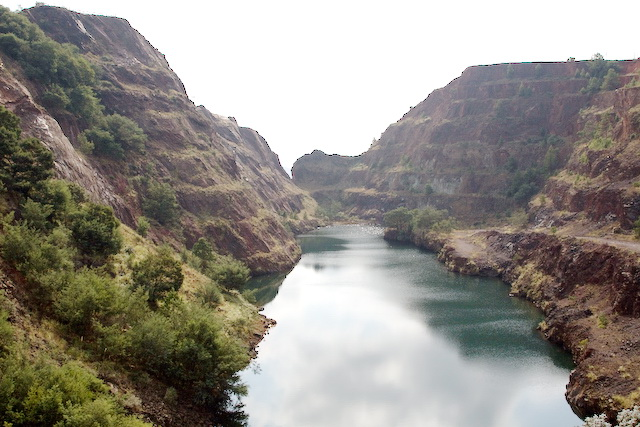
- Interactive map of Ngwenya Mine
- Location: Eswatini; 26.20178°S 31.03396°E
- Products: Iron ore (and derived specularite)
- Opened: 41,000 to 43,000 years ago (oldest mine known in History)
- Closed: 2014

The Ngwenya Mine is located on Bomvu Ridge, northwest of Mbabane and near the northwestern border of Eswatini (Swaziland). This mine is considered to be the world's oldest. The haematite ore deposit was used in the Middle Stone Age to extract red ochre, while in later times the deposit was mined for iron smelting and iron ore export.

== Etymology ==
Ngwenya means "crocodile" in siSwati. This name comes from the fact that the mountains containing the mine was crocodile-shaped, before heavy-mining began in the 1960s and defaced this ancestral shape.

== Background ==
=== Phase 1 ===
Several stone age artifacts have been found in the mine during archaeological works in the late 1960s and early 1970s. Their age was established with radiocarbon dating as older than 20,000 years. Later, radiocarbon dating yielded the age of the oldest mining activities as 41,000 to 43,000 years. This would make Ngwenya the oldest known mine. The site was known to Early Man for its deposits of red and specular haematite, used in cosmetics and rituals.

=== Phase 2 ===
Red ochre from here was extracted by the ancestors of the San and used in rock paintings, which are common in Eswatini. By about 400 AD, pastoralist Bantu tribes had been based there from the north of the Lepelle river. They were familiar with the smelting of iron ore, and traded their iron widely throughout the African continent.

=== Phase 3 ===
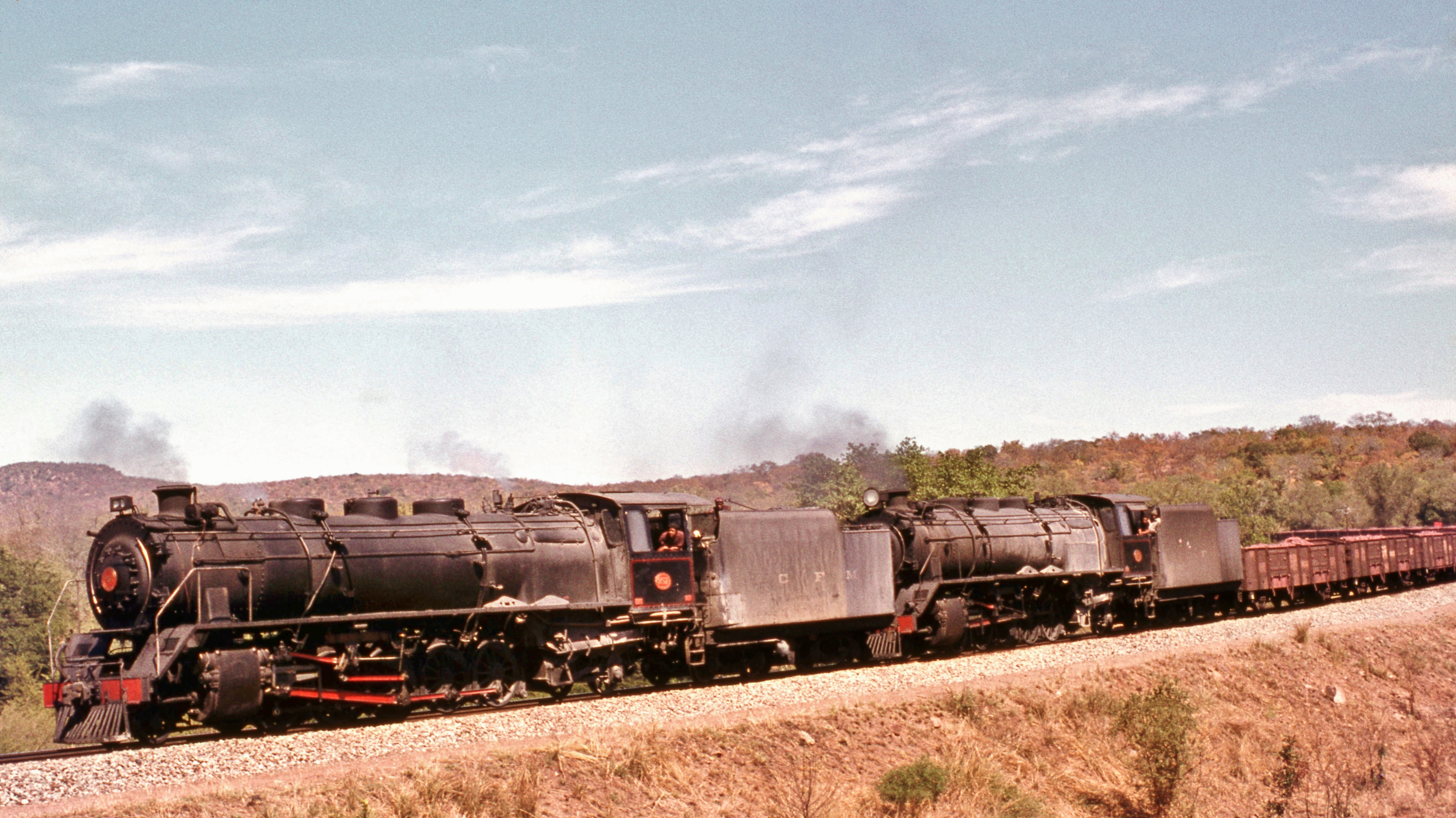
A CFM steam locomotive-hauled train of wagons loaded with iron ore from the Ngwenya Mine on the Goba railway, Eswatini (then known as Swaziland), 1970

The haematite iron ore with the iron content of up to 60% was prospected in the middle of the 19th century. The Swaziland Iron Ore Development Company (SIODC), owned by the Anglo-American Corporation, started mining of the deposit in 1964. A ten-year contract with a Japanese company made it the largest consumer of the iron ore. The open pit mining took place between 1964 and 1977, temporarily boosting the economic development of the area by establishing the Goba railway line connecting the mine with the Mozambique Railway System, and an electricity supply network (Matsapha industrial Site). An estimated 20,000,000 tonnes of iron ore have been extracted from the mine. However, an estimated 32 million tons of ore remained in the soil. Supposedly the Anglo-American Corporation stopped prospecting the mine because it got flooded.

There was a plan to revive extraction activities in the mine, but the price of iron ore fell, making the project hardly profitable. The land was eventually donated to the Swaziland National Trust Commission for management.

The mine's visitor center opened in 2005. The building was donated by the Republic of China in Taiwan, and some ancient tools displayed in the center were recovered with the help of the European Union.

In 2008, as the Swazi government was considering reopening the mine to extraction activities, the Swaziland National Trust Commission submitted the site to the UNESCO's list of World Heritage Sites to protect it, but the submission was not accepted. The inactive ancient mine is called the Lion Cavern. The modern-operations mine nearby is now flooded.

=== Phase 4 ===
The Indian group Salgaocar operated the modern-day mine from 2011 to 2014 through the Salgaocar Swaziland Limited Company. Before allocating the mine to Salgaocar, the king Mswati III dismissed the National Trust Commission's request to protect the area from new mining activities, and replaced the entire board of the Commission to permanently stop those demands.

Those operations led to a heavy pollution of the water sources that feed the city of Mbabane. Among many environmental issues, the mining operations are a threat to Disa intermedia, a protected orchid growing exclusively in the region. Cases of corruption to get the mining license were reported, including a $28 million donation to the king by Salgaocar. The deal established a 25% ownership of the mine for the king, 25% for the government, and 50% to Salgaocar. Reports also claimed that Salgaocar was using Mozambican and South African trucks to avoid paying import taxes. 2,500 jobs were announced after the Salgaocar-Swazi deals, but the positions were never created. Salgaocar ceased its mining activities in Ngwenya in 2014.

In January 2018, the Mineral Management Board announced it was ready to relaunch prospecting activities at the Ngwenya mine.

In September 2018, the visitor center burnt to ashes. The National Trust Commission declared that all the ancient artifacts in the center were lost in the fire. The officers on site did not react when the fire started to spread.

== See also ==
- Malolotja National Park
