= Swazilink =

Planned railway in southern Africa

Swazilink is a planned railway in South Africa and Eswatini.

== Route ==
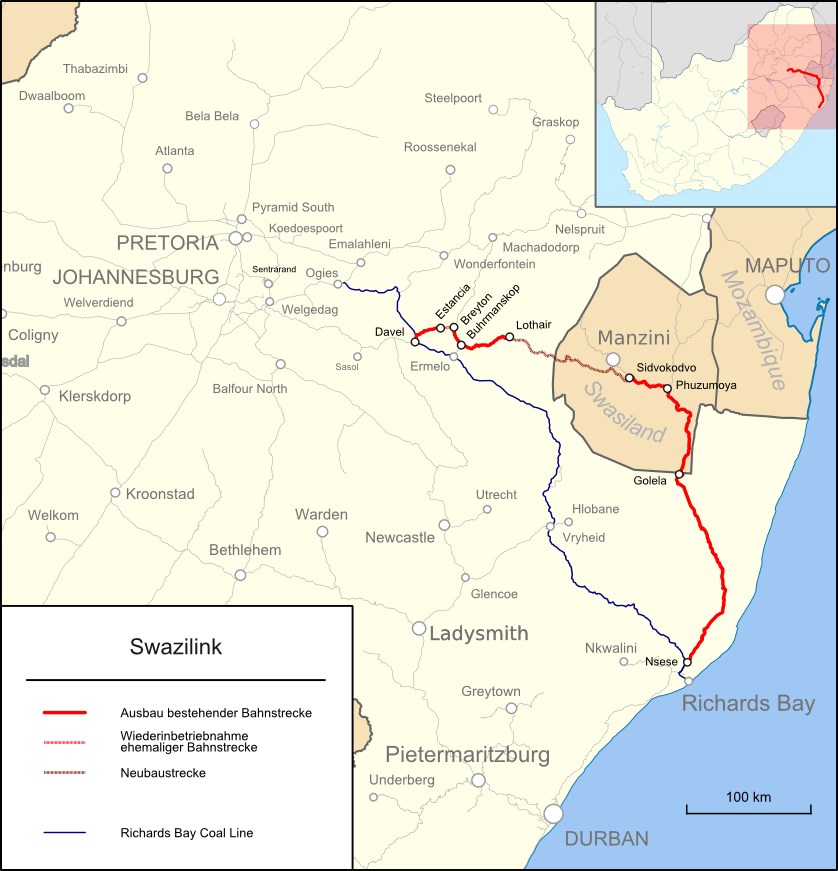
Swazilink route map Thick red line: Railway line in service Thin red line: Existing railway line out of service

The main railway would run 146 km from Lothair in Mpumalanga in South Africa to Sidvokodvo Junction in Eswatini. This would reduce the pressure on the Richards Bay line, removing general freight traffic, hence allowing more coal export trains and reducing the volume of coal transported by road. There are also plans for 600 km of connecting railways, and this route fits with several other Transnet infrastructure projects which concentrate on coal transport. This would also allow further development of the railway which takes coal from the Waterberg Coalfield via Ermelo to Richards Bay; the Waterberg coalfields have South Africa's biggest undeveloped coal reserves.

== Project ==
The project officially began in January 2012 and was initially expected to cost between R15bn and R17bn, with the South African government paying up to R12bn. The Swazi government suggested that PPP would be used, or another source of external funding. The Lothair - Sidvokodvo line itself was forecast to cost R7.3 billion, and another R8.6 billion would be spent on connecting railways. The first trains were expected to start running in 2015 or 2016.

In July 2014, Swazi Railways estimated that the link would cost R17 billion and could enter service in 2017.

Transnet is acquiring General Electric locomotives for the line.
