= Sidvokodvo =

Town in the Manzini District of Eswatini

Coordinates: 26°37′S 31°27′E

Sidvokodvo is a town in central Eswatini, situated south of Manzini. It used to host Eswatini Railway's steam shed, but steam traction has long been abandoned in Eswatini. The station area is now completely fenced and used by carriage repair industry.

Sidvokodvo is the terminus of the Swazilink rail project, which would connect Eswatini to Mpumalanga.
