= Lubombo Region =

Lubombo Region eLubonjeni
- Map of Eswatini showing Lubombo district
- Coordinates: 26°25′S 31°45′E
- Country: Eswatini
- Capital: Siteki

Government
  - Regional Administrator: Mr Esau Dube
  - Regional Secretary: Mr Eric Maziya

Area
  - Total: 5,849.11 km^{2} (2,258.35 sq mi)

Population (2017 census)
  - Total: 212,531
  - Density: 36.3356/km^{2} (94.1088/sq mi)
- Time zone: UTC+2
- HDI (2017): 0.596 medium

Lubombo is a region of Eswatini, located in the east of the country. It has an area of 5,849.11 km^{2} (2,258.35 sq mi) and a population of 212,531 (2017). Its administrative center is Siteki. It borders all three other regions: Hhohho to the north, Manzini to the west, and Shiselweni to the south. It is divided into 11 tinkhundla.

== Geography ==
Geographically, the region is dominated almost entirely by the Lowveld and Lubombo Mountains. It is the easternmost of Eswatini's four regions and its capital is Siteki. The Lowveld region is flatter, lower and warmer with a drier climate and native woody vegetation. It is suitable for large numbers of grazers and browsers, besides the Big Five game animals. Various conservation areas are located here, including Hlane Royal National Park, Mlawula Nature Reserve, Mkhaya Game Reserve and Nisela Nature Reserve. Its surface geology also differs from the country in general, being of the much younger Karoo sequence. On the region's eastern boundary the late-Jurassic Lubombo range consists of rhyolitic ignimbrites overlying basalt. These represent younger formations in the Stormberg Group, while sandstone and shale of the Stormberg and Ecca Groups are found towards the western boundary.

== Administrative divisions ==
Lubombo is subdivided to 11 tinkhundla (or constituencies). These are local administration centres, and also parliamentary constituencies. Each inkhundla is headed by an indvuna yenkhundla or governor with the help of bucopho. The tinkhundla are further divided into imiphakatsi (or chiefdoms). The present tinkhundla are:

- Dvokodvweni
  - Imiphakatsi: Enjabulweni, Etjedze, Malindza, Mampempeni, Mdumezulu, Mhlangatane, Sigcaweni
- Hlane
  - Imiphakatsi: Hlane, Khuphuka, Ntandweni, Sikhuphe
- Lomahasha
  - Imiphakatsi: Lomahasha, Mafucula, Shewula, Tsambokhulu
- Lubuli (Somntongo)
  - Imiphakatsi: Canerbury, Kavuma, Mabantaneni, Nkhanini, Sifuntaneni
- Lugongolweni
  - Imiphakatsi: Langa, Makhewu, Mlindazwe, Sitsatsaweni
- Matsanjeni North
  - Imiphakatsi: Lukhetseni, Mambane, Maphungwane, Tikhuba
- Mhlume
  - Imiphakatsi: Mhlume, Simunye, Tabankulu, Tshaneni, Vuvulane
- Mpholonjeni
  - Imiphakatsi: Kashoba, Ndzangu, Ngcina
- Nkilongo
  - Imiphakatsi: Crooks, Gamula, Lunkufu, Mayaluka, Ngcampalala
- Siphofaneni
  - Imiphakatsi: Hlutse, Kamkhweli, Macetjeni, Madlenya, Maphilingo, Mphumakudze, Nceka, Ngevini, Tambuti
- Sithobela
  - Imiphakatsi: Luhlanyeni, Mamiza, Nkonjwa
