= List of airlines of Eswatini =

This is a list of airlines operating in Eswatini.

== Active ==
Airline	Image	IATA	ICAO	Callsign	Founded	Notes
Eswatini Air		RN	SLZ	ESWATINI	2021	Flag carrier
FlyEswa					2022	Proposed

== Defunct ==
Airline	Image	IATA	ICAO	Callsign	Founded	Ceased operations	Notes
Aero Africa			RFC	AERO AFRICA	2003	2009	
African International Airways			AIN	FLY CARGO	1985	2008	
Aghalieaku Airways					2016	2017	
Air Swaziland		CW;GK	CWS		1979	1993	
Eswatini Airlink		4Z	SZL	SWAZILINK	2018	2022	
Interflight			JMV		1998	2004	
Interstate Airways					1998	1999	
Northeast Airlines			NEY	NORTHJET	2002	2005	Headquarters in Miami with hub at Fujairah Airport
ROM Atlantic Aviation					2001	2003	
Royal Swazi National Airways		ZC	RSN	ROYAL SWAZI	1978	1999	Rebranded as Swaziland Airlink
Swazi Air		WZ			1965	1977	
Swazi Airways					2016	2017	Never launched
Swazi Express Airways		Q4	SWX		1998	2008	
Swaziland Airlink		4Z	SZL	SWAZILAND	1999	2018	Renamed to Eswatini Airlink
Trans African Airways			STA		2003	2004	

== See also ==
- List of airlines
- List of airports in Eswatini
