= Special Task Force (SAPS) =

Specialised unit of the South African Police Service

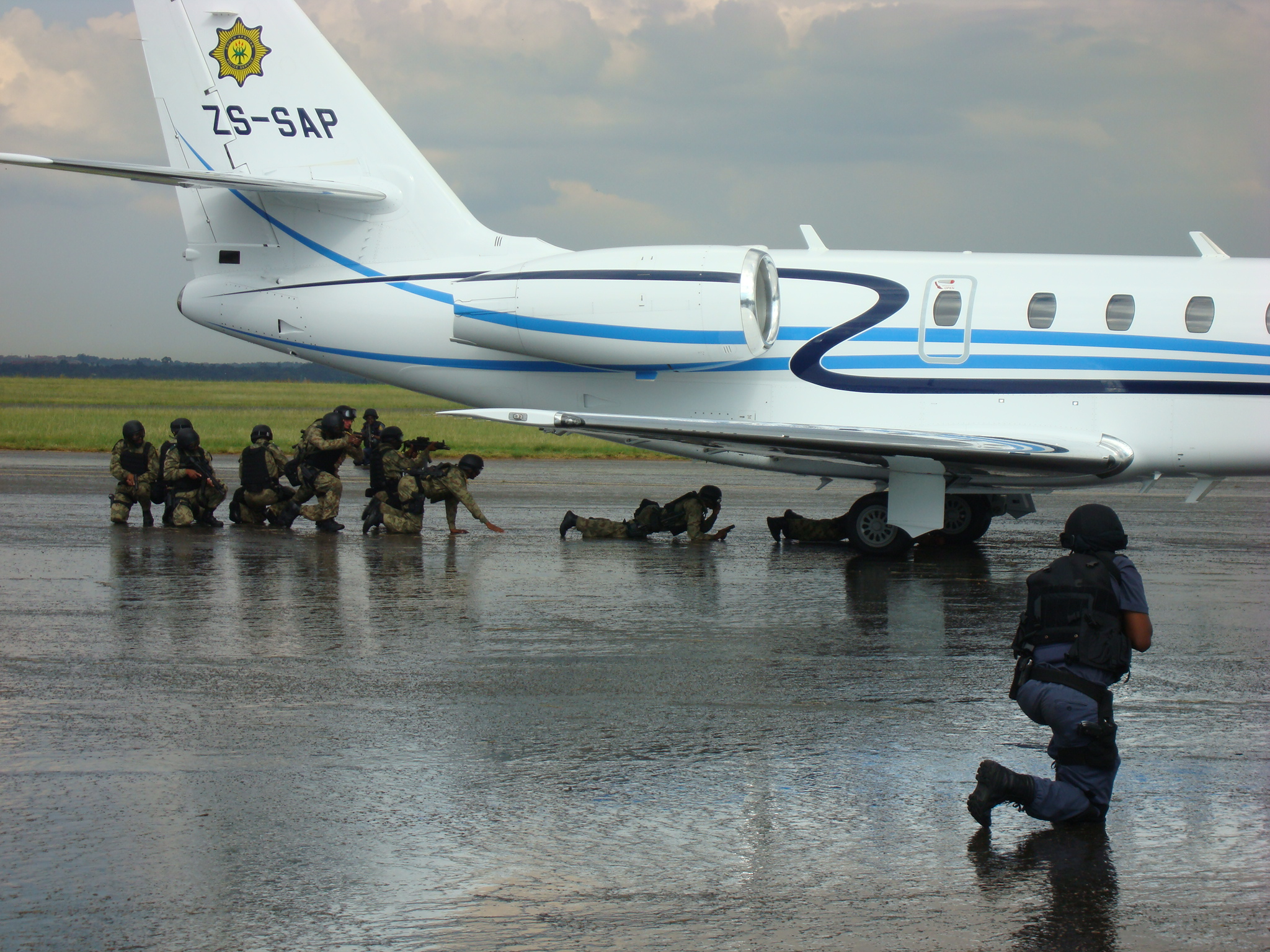
- Security simulation at Air Force Base Swartkop
- Active: 1976–present
- Country: South Africa
- Agency: South African Police Service
- Type: Police tactical unit
- Part of: Specialised operations component
- Common name: Taakies
- Abbreviation: STF

Structure
- Operators: 93 (2021)
- Stations: Cape Town; Durban; Pretoria

Commanders
- Notable commanders: Major JJ de Swardt; Colonel Bert Wandrag; Lt General Nhlanhla Mkhwanazi; Major General Jabulani Khumalo

Notables
- Significant operation(s): Rhodesia

The Special Task Force (STF) is the principal police tactical unit of the South African Police Service (SAPS). The Special Task Force handles high risk operations that fall beyond the scope of policing which require specialised skills.

== History ==
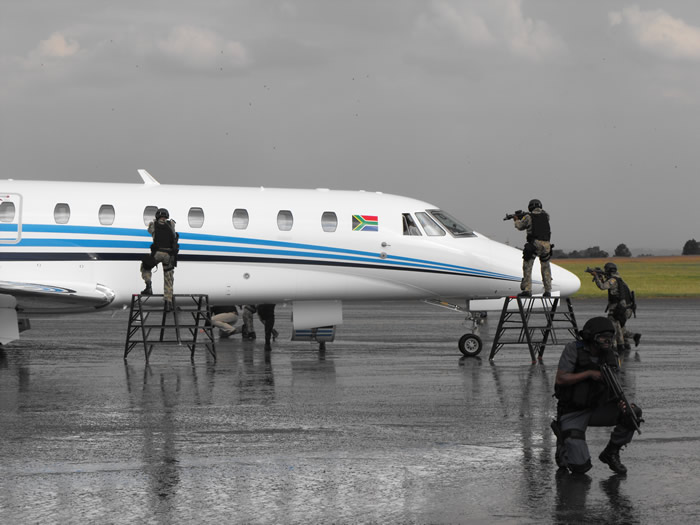
South African radio hosts, Gareth Cliff and Maurice Carpede, were taken "hostage" in a simulated hostage rescue operation by the Special Task Force to hone their skills to provide security for the 2010 FIFA World Cup.

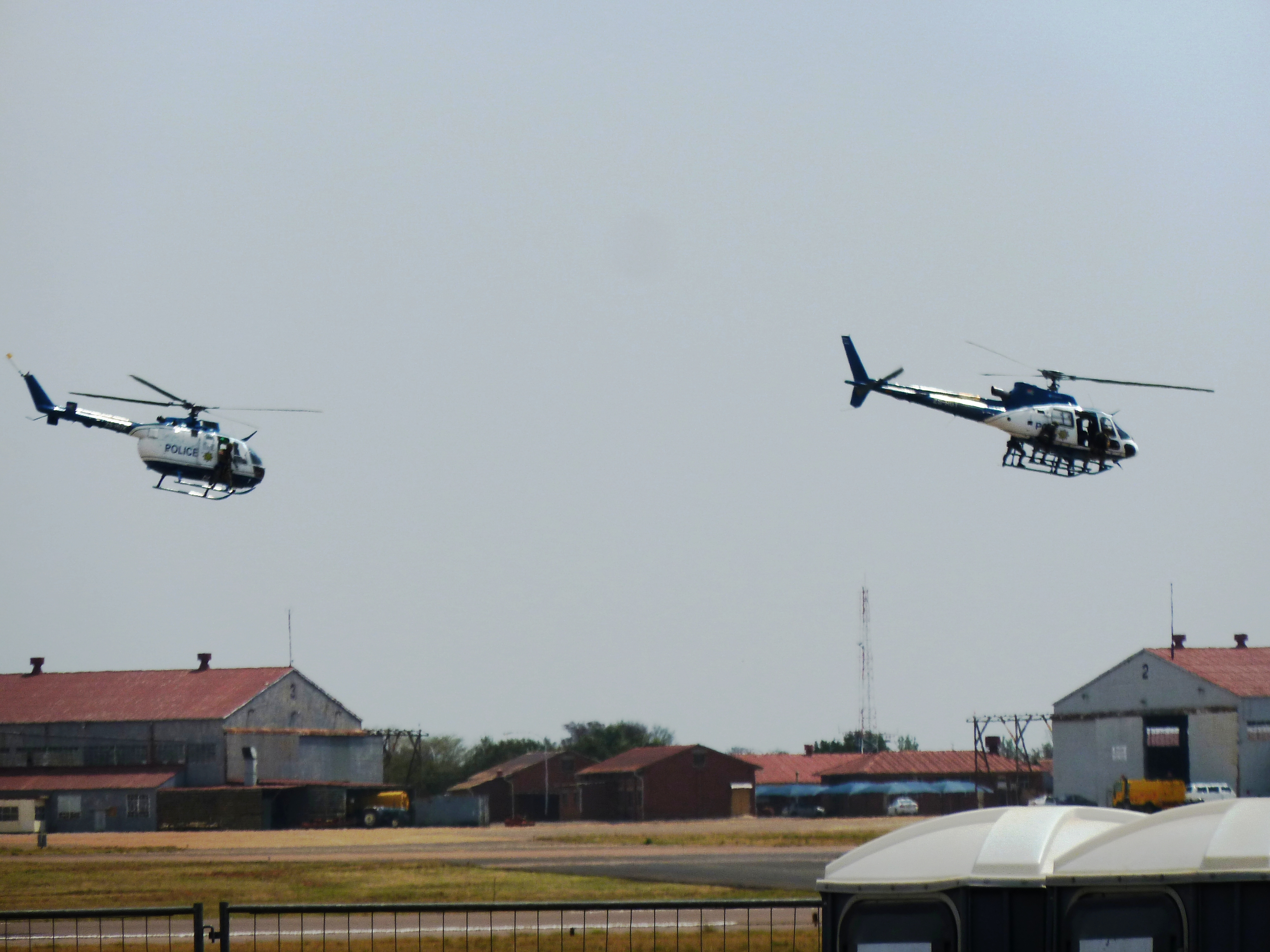
A Special Task Force demonstration at AFB Waterkloof

In 1967, about 2,000 members of the South African Police were deployed to guard the northern border of Rhodesia (modern day Zimbabwe) to assist the Rhodesian security forces as guerrilla attacks became more frequent during the Rhodesian Bush War. These police members proved to be ill-equipped and ineffective at dealing with guerrilla warfare and terrorism. As a result of these events the Security Branch of the Police began to envision a special police unit to deal with high-risk situations such as hostage situations. Captain J.J. de Swardt of the Security Branch of the Police as well as Sergeant Roelf de Plooy (a counter insurgency (COIN) instructor), both veterans of the deployments in Rhodesia against Zimbabwe African National Union rebels, began a grass roots attempt to form a group of police representatives with a shared vision of formalising a police-based special forces unit. They began to train candidate police officers in survival and bush skills to execute high-risk COIN operations and drastically reduce friendly fatalities.

The members of this ragtag group were required to join the South African Police shooting club in order to acquire R1 battle rifles. Camouflage uniforms were also unofficially acquired. Because this group, who had taken on the name of 'Bliksems', was an unofficial group within the Police Force, the normal training facilities were not accessible. A vacant area near the Baviaanspoort Correctional Services that could be used for live-fire handgun and rifle training, and which also had an urban environment with rural terrain, was eventually found by Col. van der Merwe. Capt. J.J. de Swardt then proceeded to hire instructors from Hunter Group of the South African Defence Force (SADF) such as martial arts specialist, Joe Grant Grierson. Training was based around weapons handling, rural patrol formations and tactics, ambushes and skirmishes and was based on military protocol. Rock climbing, rope access, rescue work, skydiving and parachute training also occurred later on. Other instructors of the team were Bill du Toit (an ex-special forces soldier) who specialised in terror tactics, Mr K. Lucy who was an expert in rope work and abseiling, Mr T. Segala who had an extensive knowledge of booby traps and Improvised explosive devices, Gary Magnusson and Hannes Smit who were experienced civilian skydivers and Major Jakkals de Jager who was a paratrooper in the SADF.

In 1973, during the South African Games, the Israeli government stated that it would send their team but only on the sole condition that their security would be guaranteed. Gen. Mike Geldenhuys, who was the head of the South African Police Security Branch at the time, arranged for Capt. de Swardt and his 'Bliksems' to provide security for the foreign team. For this, the South African Police received much praise and attention from the international press as well as a commendation from the South African Secretary for Foreign Affairs which solidified the idea of a police special forces unit. On 28 April 1975, however, a hostage siege occurred at the Israeli embassy and the Police (lacking an official counter terrorist force) could not resolve the situation. This became known as the Fox Street Siege. In 1975, the counter insurgency conflict in South-West Africa (now named Namibia) also broke out and police and military manpower was now stretched between two COIN campaigns. The South African Police was forced to withdraw from the South-West African border as well as from Rhodesia and earned the Battle Honour Rhodesia.

In 1975, the Bureau of State Security supported the creation of the unit and on 6 June 1975, Brigadier Vic Verster wrote an official recommendation from the South African Police Security Branch to the Commissioner of the South African Police and proposed the structure, command and control plans for the Special Task Force. Then finally on 1 February 1976 Lt. Gen. Mike Geldenhuys officially authorised the creation of the Special Task Force. Col. Dries Verwey was appointed as the first commanding officer (CO) of the Special Task Force and Capt. J.J. de Swardt and the core group of the 'Bliksems' were transferred to the Special Task Force as instructors. During the first phase of selection the unit received 113 applications, yet only 38 were accepted including 4 reserve members including one medic.

After Gen. Mike Geldenhuys was appointed as the Commissioner of the South African Police in 1978, he transferred command and control of the Special Task Force from the Security Branch of the SAP over to Counter Insurgency (COIN) under the command of Major General Vic Verster. The divisional commander was Colonel Bert Wandrag with operational command under Major JJ de Swardt.

== Functions ==
=== Primary functions ===
- To resolve high risk situations which cannot be dealt with efficiently by ordinary members of the South African Police Service.
- To resolve hostage situations on land (buses, trains and buildings such as national key points and embassies), sea (oil platforms, ships in harbors and own territorial waters) and air (civilian local and international aircraft).
- To combat urban and rural terror.
- To provide assistance to other divisions of the SAPS, which require the specialized skills, techniques and equipment of the unit, such as Murder and Robbery, Motor Vehicle Theft, etc.
- To provide assistance to units responsible for the protection of high-profile VIPs, as well as the periodic unassisted protection of high-profile VIPs where the skills required, fall beyond the capabilities of available VIP units, such as the provision of snipers for counter-sniper measures.
- To provide a specialized rescue service, and assistance during natural disasters that require high proficiency in mountaineering, emergency diving and other rescue operations.
- To provide a specialized operational, tactical and continuation training to all members of the Special Task Force to enable the unit to perform the primary and secondary functions of the unit.
- To provide a specialized policing service to neighbouring countries' police, in accordance with agreements reached between the South African government and the countries involved.

=== Secondary functions ===
- The consultation on and the provision of specialized training to other South African Police Service divisions and other approved organizations.
- The evaluation of specialized equipment.
- The execution of any other duties that fall within the scope of high risk operations, assigned by the Minister for Safety and Security and the National Commissioner of the SAPS or the Divisional Commissioner, Crime Prevention and Response Services.
- The special task force work in an unofficial capacity within the South African Police Service Crime Intelligence Division and the State Security Agency.

== Equipment ==
The Special Task Force uses a wide variety of arms and assorted equipment:

Pistols

- H&K USP (and Compact)
- Glock 17

Sub-Machine Guns

- H&K MP5N

Assault rifles

- R5 Assault Rifle
- R3 Assault Rifle

Sniper rifles

- McMillan TAC-50
- AICS .308 & .338
- Steyr SSG 69

Shotguns

- Beretta RS202M1 (and RS200)

Machine guns

- 7.62mm FN MAG
- 7.62mm Browning Machine Gun (and 12.7mm)

Grenade launcher

- Y2 MK1 Multi Grenade Launcher (40mm)

Grenades

- M26 grenade
- Stun and smoke grenades

Other equipment

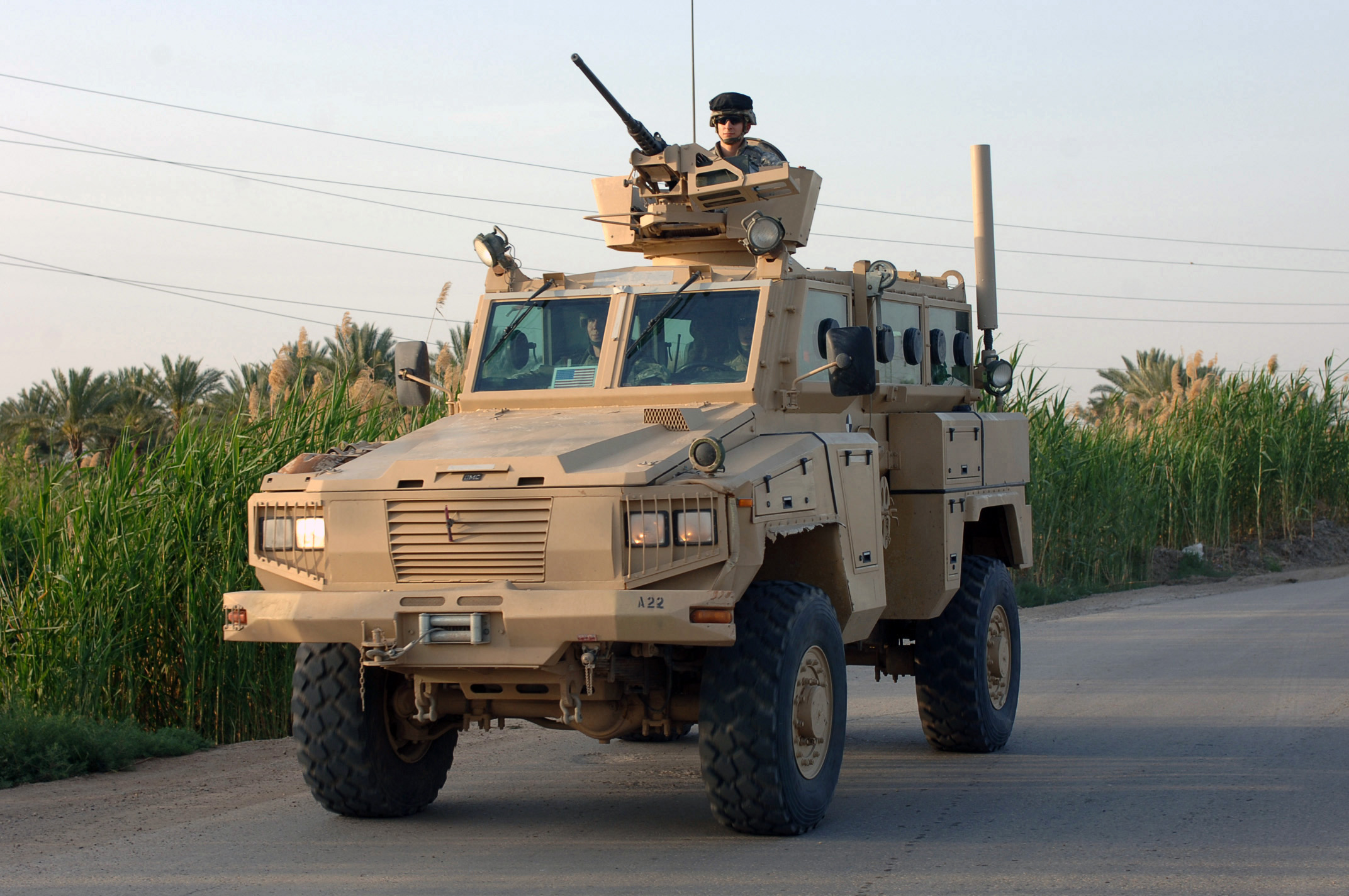
RG-31 armoured personnel carrier

- Night vision and thermography
- Short-range radar imaging equipment
- Unmanned aerial vehicle
- Breaching and bomb disposal equipment

Vehicles

- RG-12 armoured personnel carrier
- RG-31 infantry mobility vehicle
- Casspir mine-resistant ambush protected vehicle

Aircraft

- MBB Bo 105 helicopter

== Major operations ==
=== 25 January 1980 ===
Three MK Cadres – Stephen Mafoko, Humphrey Makhubo and Wilfred Madela – were allegedly on their way to carry out a planned MK sabotage mission on petrol depots at Waltloo near Mamelodi. En route, 'the Trio' realised they were being tailed by the police. In an attempt to escape, they took refuge in a branch of Volkskas Bank in Silverton, Pretoria. They held 25 civilians in the bank hostage, making a number of demands, including a meeting with State President Vorster, the release of Nelson Mandela and a man called Mange, as well as R100 000 in cash and an aircraft to fly them to Maputo.

After a series of negotiations, which included the police handing over food to the cadres and hostages, in the ensuing release operation, Special Task Force members killed all three cadres. Two civilians, Valerie Anderson and Anna de Klerk, were killed and many others were wounded in the shootout. General Coetzee was awarded the South African Police Star for Outstanding Service for the bravery he showed when he walked into the bank, unarmed, to negotiate with the cadres.

=== 25–30 January 1981 ===
Laingsburg flood disaster. The Special Task Force lead the search and rescue operations. Forty-seven bodies were recovered in five days. The Special Task Force also rendered disaster relief assistance to the local population.

=== 30 July 1988 ===
Hostage situation, Goedemoed Prison. Using sharpened objects, 22 prisoners attacked the prison warders at Goedemoed Prison in the southern Free State. One of the warders failed to escape and was taken hostage in a cell. The hostage was stabbed twice in the neck while one of the warders was trying to negotiate with the prisoners. The SAPS Special Task Force was called in to assist in the matter. Nine members of the Special Task Force were flown to Goedemoed Prison. The Special Task Force freed the hostage with the assistance of the negotiator (warder) and the Reaction Unit of Bloemfontein. The two prisoners who held the warder hostage, were wounded, one of them fatally.

=== 14 September 1988 ===
The Bus Capture at Lesotho. The Pope visited Maseru on the above date. Four members of the Lesotho Freedom Alliance hijacked a bus transporting 74 passengers at the British Embassy. The SAPS Special Task Force was called in to assist in the matter. When negotiations failed, the terrorists began shooting at the bystanders in the British Consulate. They then attempted to use the bus to ram through the embassy gates. The Special Task Force stormed the bus, killing three terrorists and capturing one. They disarmed an improvised booby trap (explosive device). 17 hostages who were injured by hostile gunfire were stabilised by Special Task Force medics.

=== 13 December 1989 ===
Body recovery at Selby Mine, Johannesburg. Two members of the Special Task Force assisted the Brixton Murder and Robbery Unit in recovering a corpse from the Selby mineshaft, Johannesburg. The corpse was found at a depth of 141 meters. Obstructions, bad construction and the threat of toxic gases created additional hazards. Two members of the Special Task Force were individually lowered into the shaft, but were forced to return to the surface owing to respiratory difficulties. One member was given oxygen apparatus and lowered down the shaft again. After securing the corpse to a rope, he was hoisted to the surface. Both members were awarded the South African Police Cross for Bravery for their unselfish deed.

=== 11 January 1993 ===
Hostage situation in Walmer, Port Elizabeth. An ex-defence force member took a woman hostage and held her at gunpoint. As negotiations failed, the Special Task Force entered the building and incapacitated the captor with 2 shots. The hostage was not hurt.

=== 4 July 1993 ===
Hijacked Fokker F-28 at Jan Smuts International Airport. A Fokker F-28 airliner of Royal Swazi Airlines with 21 passengers on board was hijacked and diverted to Jan Smuts Airport, near Johannesburg. The SAPS Special Task Force was summoned to the scene and 22 members were dispatched to the airport to contain the situation and release the hostages. After being informed by the psychologist on the scene that the hijacker was emotionally unstable and irrational and a threat to the hostages, the Special Task Force was given the command to recapture the aircraft and to release the hostages. The hijacker was wounded in the head during the storming of the aircraft. A hostage was wounded in the shoulder and the pilot in the leg. No casualties were sustained by members of the Special Task Force.

=== 10 July 1994 ===
Arrest of Weapon Smugglers at Nduma. Weapons were regularly smuggled from Mozambique to South Africa via the Kruger National Park which borders on Mozambique. The Organized Crime Unit and Firearm Tracing Unit requested the Special Task Force to be of assistance by way of observation duties of specified areas which had been identified by informers as areas which the smugglers readily use. Ten members of the Special Task Force were deployed to the Nduma area in the Kruger National Park where they established observation posts. The operation was successful and three Mozambicans were traced and arrested. The members seized 30 AK-47 rifles and three SAM-7 ground-to-air missiles.

=== 27 October 1994 ===
Hostage Situation and Attempted Suicide at Telkom Offices, Pretoria. A man armed with a firearm and was upset about the non-payment of his salary, entered the Telkom Distribution offices where he worked and took a number of people hostage. The hostage negotiators and 21 members of the Special Task Force were deployed to the scene. After prolonged negotiations, all the hostages were released but the man refused to surrender and threatened to take his own life. The Special Task Force were still in position and ready to take action while the negotiations with the man continued. While the negotiations were taking place, the man decided, without warning, to move to another office. The man was overwhelmed in the passage after his attention had been drawn by a stun grenade and he was disarmed. Neither the man nor the people who disarmed him were injured in the incident.

=== 15 June 1994 ===
Rescue Operation SALU Building, Pretoria. 28 members of the Special Task Force raced to the city center to assist with a rescue operation. A building with a number of floors was on fire and personnel working in the building above the floors which were on fire, were trapped. Members of the Special Task Force, SAPS Air Wing and SA Air Force using helicopters rescued people from the top of the building. Other members used roping equipment to evacuate the trapped people to safety. Only a small number of people were treated for minor burns and smoke inhalation.

=== 1 March 1995 ===
Hostage Situation Bella Vista, Johannesburg. A man took his fiancee and her little daughter hostage after a family dispute. The hostage negotiators and six members of the Special Task Force were deployed to the scene. During negotiations, the man continually held a knife against the throat of his fiancee and also sodomised her in the presence of her daughter. The child was also ill-treated by the man while his fiancee had to watch. A tactical release of the hostages was the only way out. One member of the Special Task Force was employed as a sniper and during the tactical release of the hostages, the man was fatally wounded. A firearm was found in the room where the man had held the woman and child hostage.

=== 27 November 1995 ===
Kidnapping and Hostage Situation, Vereeniging. The Intelligence Service and CID of Secunda and Vereeniging requested the assistance of the Special Task Force in an operation to locate the whereabouts of a man who had been kidnapped and was being held hostage. Information at hand was that the man had been kidnapped by 3 men and was being held hostage in a Daleside, Vereeniging house. Nine members of the Special Task Force were made available for the operation and the kidnapped man was released uninjured during a tactical release. All three men were arrested without a single shot being fired. Five firearms which had been used by the hostage takers were seized.

=== 6 August 1995 ===
Hostage Situation Hollywood Café, Sunnyside. A man fleeing from the SAPS on 6 August 1995, took a woman hostage in the Hollywood Café, Esselen Street, Sunnyside. The Special Task Force was summoned to the scene by Radio Control, after which the hostage taker was arrested and the hostage tactically released. The man was found guilty of armed robbery, kidnapping, pointing of a firearm and possession of an unlicensed firearm.

=== 24 to 25 February 1995 ===
Hostage Situation, St Albans Prison – Port Elizabeth. Twenty-two members of the Special Task Force were summoned to St Albans Prison, Port Elizabeth where approximately 105 prisoners had taken a prison warder hostage. During the night of 24–25 February 1995, after prolonged negotiations the prison warder was released after a tactical release lasting 20 seconds. One hostage taker was fatally wounded. One injured and the other prisoners were arrested. The hostage was released without injuries. Two firearms and a M26 hand grenade were seized after the operation.

=== 12 August 1996 ===
Hostage Situation 34 Baccus Street, Irene. On 12 August 1996, a man took a year old baby hostage at 34 Baccus Street, Irene. The Special Task Force deployed 21 members to the scene. During negotiations, snipers were deployed in the vicinity. The snipers observed that the man held the baby in front of him with a knife to its throat all the time. The hostage taker only moved a curtain occasionally to see what was going on outside, but never let go of the baby. Negotiations which had lasted a long time did not succeed and it was decided on a tactical release of the baby by members of the Special Task Force. During the tactical release, both snipers fired simultaneously, fatally wounding the hostage taker. The baby was safely released without any injuries.

=== 22 May 1997 ===
Hostage Situation Nandos, Johannesburg. Three robbers trying to rob Nandos on the corner of Cromhout and Kimberley Streets, Johannesburg were cornered by members of the SAPS Johannesburg after being alerted by members of the public. The robbers took the employees of Nandos hostage. A gun-battle between the robbers and the SAPS took place during which two members of the SAPS were wounded. 19 members of the Special Task Force were deployed. During the release of the hostages, the three robbers were wounded and arrested. No members of the public were injured.

=== 25 June 2006 ===
The Jeppestown Massacre, Jeppestown, central Johannesburg. After a robbery, 23 robbers were followed by a police helicopter to a safe house. Four SAPS members were murdered and eight robbers were killed in the siege before the remaining 15 gang members surrendered. Members of the Special Task Force were deployed to assist the SAPS in ending the siege.

=== 15 December 2009 ===
Special Task Force snipers ended a 20-hour-long hostage situation at a farm outside Petrusburg in the Free State when two armed attackers took a farmer hostage when he and his son-in-law confronted them, after they had robbed another farmer. Thereafter the attackers hijacked the farmers' vehicle. His son-in-law managed to escape by diving out of the moving vehicle. Police chased after the vehicle at about 14:00, but the hijackers refused to hand themselves over and negotiations were carried out by the police hostage negotiator at about 16:00. The Special Task Force arrived on the scene between 17:00 and 18:00. At about 7:00 Special Task Force snipers shot and killed both attackers. The hostage only had minor injuries and was taken to the hospital.

=== 10 August – 20 September 2012 ===
Marikana Miners Strike, Rustenburg. Members of the Special Task Force were deployed to the Lonmin owned mine in the Marikana area after two police officials, two security guards and four miners were murdered by striking miners between 12 and 14 August. On 16 August, after storming police forces with traditional weapons and small arms, 34 miners were shot dead by SAPS members and another 78 miners were injured. This became known as the Marikana Massacre.

=== 24 November 2012 ===
Protea Coin cash compound, Robertsville, western Johannesburg. At around 17:00, the Special Task Force confronted a group of 20 heavily armed cash-in-transit robbers in a foiled robbery. After the robbers were cornered and opened fire on the members of the Task Force, they returned fire killing seven and wounding nine of the robbers. None of the Task Force members were injured in the shootout.

=== December 2013 ===
The Special Task Force was deployed to provide additional security when about 91 heads of state and leaders attended the state memorial service of Nelson Mandela and his funeral after he died on 5 December 2013.

=== 10 December 2016 ===
Eight suspected ATM bombers were killed in a shoot-out when Special Task Force officers intercepted them as they were travelling to Howick. No Special Task Force members were injured.

== Recruitment and training ==
Prospective members have to be under 32 years old and must have served at least two years in operational policing in the South African Police Service. The volunteer must also show certain traits such as:

- Physical strength and ability
- A sense of responsibility
- Mental Endurance
- Maturity
- Leadership skills
- Sound judgement
- Perseverance
- Rational and methodical thinking
- Handling stress
- Observation and orientation skills

Applicants for a career in the Special Task Force must be:

- Willing to undergo and pass psychometric evaluations;
- Medically fit (with doctor's recommendations);
- Able to and skilled at swimming;
- Prepared to undergo training for nine months, (basic & advanced training);
- Voluntary applicants;
- Permanent members of the SAPS with the rank of constable, sergeant or warrant officer;
- Comply with the specific physical requirements for male or female candidates respectively; and
- Prepared to do advanced courses for three years.

All Task Force applicants are volunteers and have to comply with stringent physical requirements before being admitted to the basic training and selection course. The basic training course is twenty-six weeks long and includes weapons, rural and urban combat as well as basic parachute training courses. Compulsory advanced courses include special skills such as diving, VIP protection, explosives and medical training. The initial training period is nine months, but completing all the requisite advanced courses to become a full-fledged Special Task Force operational member may last up to three years.

Highlighting the stringent selection process during the Special Task Force Training Course in 2005, 453 applications were received. When pre-selection was done, only 108 of the 453 candidates measured up to pre-selection requirements. Of the 108 who made it through pre-selection, only 42 completed the Preparation and Condition (PREPCON) phase, and only 20 candidates managed to complete the Vasbyt phase. The recruits who did not pass the PREPCON phase admitted that their failure to do so was due to insufficient preparation for the course because they had thought that STF's standards have been lowered. Members of the unit have visited foreign units of a similar role on several occasions, to ensure that the structure and procedures of the unit is in line with international training courses, and to keep up with changes in training and other specialized fields.

According to the South African Qualifications Authority (SAQA), the recipients of the "National Diploma: South African Special Forces Operations" qualification (Qualification ID: 48879) will be able to:

- Apply special weapons and tactics.
- Apply air infiltration techniques.
- Perform building assaults.
- Sustain themselves away from base in the field.

Although membership of the Special Task Force is open to both male and female SAPS members, female operatives undergo a separate selection course.

== Current ==
In 2004, it was reported that the SAPS Special Task Force may have lost nearly 60 percent (130 operators) of its active members (230 operators) to private companies recruiting security personnel to work in Iraq and other conflict countries due to the demand for their skills.

As of 2004, with the implementation of affirmative action policy and a special course for females, the Special Task Force welcomed their first female operators in its ranks.

In 2010, top officers of the unit were sent to the United States to brush up on their crisis response skills.

In 2021-2022, the STF "responded to 280 medium to high risk incidents".

In 2023, the first female completed the selection training programme "without any amendments to the training to suit females".

== See also ==
- South African Police Service National Intervention Unit
- South African Police Service Counter Assault Team
