= National Intervention Unit =

Unit of the South African Police Service

- National Intervention Unit Operational Badge
- Active: 2000 – present
- Country: South Africa
- Agency: South African Police Service
- Type: Police tactical unit
- Part of: Division Operational Response Services
- Abbreviation: NIU

Structure
- Officers: Approx. 280-330
- Stations: Pretoria; Durban; Mthatha; Cape Town

Commanders
- Notable commanders: Brigadier ME Tsiloane

The National Intervention Unit (NIU) is a police tactical unit, part of the special operations element of the South African Police Service (SAPS).

The National Intervention Unit is one of the SAPS's elite units. It was established in 2000 to address high-risk operations and assist the Special Task Force as it was faced with an increased workload and limited resources. The NIU provides operational support for the Special Task Force.

== Mission ==
To stabilise volatile situations by combating serious and violent crimes, the policing of high-risk public violence, rendering specialised operational support to provinces/units/divisions of South Africa.

== Purpose ==
The NIU render a specialised operational support function focused on planned, intelligence-driven and targeted military deployments to address specific incidents of crime and public violence, and not day-to-day crowd management operations.

== Function overview ==
=== Primary functions ===
In situations where other South African Police Service units, sections, or stations are not trained and equipped to deal with dangerous situations, the Intervention Units will take over, contain and conduct follow-up operations of incidents of serious violent crimes such as, but not limited to:

- Taxi violence.
- Gang related crimes.
- Farm attacks.
- Acts of urban terrorism.
- Rapid response to armed robbery and Cash-in-transit & open-air heists etc.
- Address medium-risk and high-risk policing duties, specifically at incidents of violence where normal policing is deemed inadequate.
- Barricaded suspects.
- Dangerous Arrest / High Risk Warrants.
- Dangerous / High Risk / Difficult search warrants.
- Deal with high risk public violence; and
- Execute self-initiated operations to address specific incidents of crime.

The rendering of specialized operational support:

- The National Intervention Unit will render assistance to various units with -
  - The apprehension and escorting of dangerous high profile criminals
  - The safeguarding of VIPs, whenever a need arises
- Participate in planned intelligence driven operations.
- The combating of public violence (not day-to-day crowd management operations)
- The National Intervention Unit will perform specialized tasks in urban and rural areas to combat violent public collective actions, e.g. intergroup violence.

=== Secondary functions ===
- International Deployment (UN Police / SADC / African Union)
- The consultation on and the provision of specialized training to other South African Police Service divisions and other approved organizations.

== Deployment ==
Divisional Instruction: Establishing and Functioning of National Intervention Units, 20 FeNational Read more: https://briefly.co.za/south-africa/169430-2-people-killed-zimbali-police-sting-operation-linked-richards-bay/bruary 2010.

- The NIU will be activated through its various unit commanders for day-to-day operational support.
- The Divisional Commissioner of Operational Response Services will prioritise and approve the deployment of the unit to other provinces. The National Commissioner can, however, deploy the NIU to any province should she/he so desire.
- All requests for assistance must be submitted to the Divisional Commissioner of Operational Response Services.
- In provinces where the National Intervention Units are stationed, the Provincial Head of Operational Response Services will be responsible for maintaining the NIU capacity in the province.

== History ==
The National Intervention Unit can trace its origins to the Reaction Units which were established in the Riot Units in 1979. In 2000, the Division: Operational Response Services decided to standardize training and techniques for these units and formed the National High Risk Policing Capability. Four units were strategically placed at Pretoria, Durban, Mthatha and Cape Town.

These units participate in intelligence-driven operations to combat crime in the service areas of police stations and are responsible for stabilizing tense situations when normal policing is insufficient, such as intervening at incidents of public violence when Public Order Policing (POP) Units can no longer handle the situation.

Their work also includes the combating of serious and violent crime incidents such as cash-in-transit heists, ATM bombings, armed robberies and urban terrorism.

== Recruitment and training ==
Prospective members have to be at least 21 years old and must have served at least two years in the South African Police Service. The volunteer must also show certain traits such as:

- Physical strength and ability
- A sense of responsibility
- Mental Endurance
- Maturity
- Leadership skills
- Sound judgement
- Perseverance
- Rational and methodical thinking
- Handling stress
- Observation and orientation skills

Applicants for a career in the NIU must be:

- Willing to undergo and pass psychometric evaluations;
- Medically fit (with doctor's recommendations);
- Able to and skilled at swimming;
- Prepared to undergo training for five months (All phases);
- Voluntary applicants;
- Permanent members of the SAPS with the rank of Constable, Sergeant or Warrant Officer;
- Comply with the specific physical requirements for male or female candidates respectively; and
- Prepared to do advanced courses for three years.

=== Phobia testing ===
- Acrophobia
- Hydrophobia or Aquaphobia
- Claustrophobia

=== Successfully complete a pre-selection programme ===
Prospective candidates who volunteer must undergo and successfully complete a pre-selection programme which includes psychometric evaluations before they will progress to an individual endurance programme.

The 69-hour individual endurance programme assesses the individual's attributes which includes:

- Effects on the individual during sleep deprivation;
- Effects on the individual due to a lack of food;
- Ability to perform optimally under strenuous situations while deprived of sleep and food;
- Ability to perform in a team context;
- Ability to lead a group while under strenuous physical and mental stress;
- Ability to encourage group cohesion while under mental stress;
- Ability to show initiative.

Prospective members applying to join NIU Units must follow the appropriate career paths starting at the Public Order Policing Unit, and then proceed to the Tactical Response Unit before they can join the National Intervention Unit. Members who wish to grow their careers further may then join the South African Police Service Special Task Force (SAPS STF).

All National Intervention applicants are volunteers and have to comply with stringent physical requirements before being admitted to the basic training and selection course. The volunteer must also show certain personal traits such as maturity, leadership skills, and sound judgment.

The basic training course includes weapons, rural and urban combat training courses. Compulsory advanced courses include special skills such as diving, VIP protection, explosives and medical training.

Although membership of the National Intervention Unit is open to both male and female SAPS members, female operatives undergo a separate selection course.

== Current ==
The National Intervention Unit is actively involved in anti-rhino poaching operations in South Africa, stabilizing industrial and mining unrest as well as intervening in situations involving political violence.

The National Intervention Unit, as a part of the operational response services division - along with Public Order Policing units, the Special Task force, the Tactical Response Teams and the air-wing - were a central part of the police strategy that resulted in the Marikana Massacre. Their operational commander at Marikana, Lieutenant Colonel Kaizer Modiba, testified before the Farlam Commission of inquiry into the massacre in which he was shown to have ordered his officers to immediately sweep the nearby hill for more weapons rather than seeing to the injuries of the miners who had just been shot. This was "criticised because most NIU members had level-three first aid qualifications as part of their NIU training... According to the police service's official crime scene policy, the first member at the crime scene “with due consideration of the integrity of physical evidence, must assist the injured within the limitation of his or her training as a matter of priority”." When questioned, Modiba could not recall that he had read the police's crime scene policy.

The National Intervention Unit, as a part of the Formed Police Unit / African Standby Force (ASF) for SADC (Southern African Development Community) is conducting operations in Lesotho attempting to restore peace, stability and democracy.
