= Reaction Unit (South African Police Service) =

South African Police Service Reaction Unit
- Active: 1979 – 2001
- Country: South Africa
- Branch: South African Police Service
- Role: Medium to High Risk Law Enforcement
- Size: approx. 150 operatives (in 21 years)
- Part of: Under control of Regional Riot Units
- Stationed in: Pretoria, Durban, Bloemfontein or Cape Town

Commanders
- Notable commanders: Major Dantjie Haupt, Lieutenant Tony Bruytenbach, Lieutenant Robby Cook, Captain Pine Pienaar, Captain Mike Vosloo, Warrant Officer Tommy Stewart

The Reaction Unit was a counter-terrorist force within the South African Police (SAP) from 1979 to 2001, in support of the SAP Special Task Force. Elements of the Reaction Unit were attached to Regional Riot Units in locations throughout South Africa, the first of which was in Durban. Its recruits were specially selected and trained in order to maintain a small but high-quality tactical support unit.

== Mission ==
The Reaction Unit was intended to combat urban terrorism, provide specialised support during operations in rural areas, and assist with search and rescue operations anywhere in South Africa.

== History ==
Before 1979 the only police unit who had the capability of addressing high risk operations, including urban terrorism, was the Special Task Force (STF). The STF had only one base at the time, which was situated in Pretoria, and due to its scrupulous and strenuous selection-and-training process for new operators it was faced with an increased workload and limited resources. The force identified the need to expand its capacity throughout the country. In response the Reaction Unit was established in 1979 as a support unit to the STF and was tasked with counter-terrorism Operations. The unit was formed from the regional Riot Units. It was given the name 'Task Force Platoon One' and was situated in Port Natal (Durban). Initially its task was to combat urban terrorism where and when the STF was tasked elsewhere.

Task Force Platoon One was placed under the command of Captain Casper Claase. It began with twenty members, who underwent an eight-week training programme developed by Captain Mike Fryer, the lead training officer of the STF. It was later renamed as the "Reaction Unit" when it expanded to Cape Town, Bloemfontein and Diepkloof Unit 2 (Soweto).

In July 2001 the name of the Reaction Unit was changed to the "Tactical Intervention Group" (TIG). It was changed again at the end of 2004 to the National Intervention Unit (NIU).

== Recruitment and training ==
The Reaction Unit recruited volunteers from the respective Regional Riot Units until the mid 1990s, after which new applicants were also accepted from other parts of the police force. The rigorous selection process and the intense eight-week training programme, presented twice annually, attracted a low volunteer turnout and produced an even lower number of new recruits who successfully completed training. The average success rate was five percent or less. It was not uncommon for the various Reaction Units to grow by as little as one member per year. Restricting the number of members was considered to enhance the team's solidarity, secrecy and security, making the Reaction Unit a popular choice for tactical support during various high-profile police operations.

== Commendations ==
The Reaction Unit No. 9 (Durban) received 23 commendations, which included a Presidential Commendation, awarded to the unit while it was under the command of Captain Pine Pienaar. The number of commendations awarded to the Reaction Unit No. 9 was a significant consideration when the Reaction Units were brought under the National Intervention Unit (NIU).

== Badge design ==
When the Reaction Unit was first formed it had no identifying emblem. Around two years after the unit's formation the commander, Major Dantjie Haupt, decided to task each of the members of the Reaction Unit No. 9 to design and submit a badge. The badge design submitted by Constable Andy Wood was selected and became the identifiable emblem of the unit. The badge contained reference to the unit's station number, which was derived from the station number of the riot unit of the area from which most of its members were recruited.

=== Badge legend ===
Forged upon a Shield, bearing in gold, the letters SAP, is another Shield, and blazoned upon in Gold an African Fish Eagle with open claws, below in gold is the number in reference to the Unit Station, and above with an unsigned ribbon, bearing the letters REACTION UNIT Sable; below with an unsigned ribbon, bearing in gold the name of the Unit Station Sable.

== Recognised badges issued ==
Badge	Station	Province	Description	Notes
	Port Natal	KwaZulu-Natal	Issued to active duty members of the South African Police, Reaction Unit, Port Natal, 1979–1994. This badge was only worn with Camouflaged Uniform.	45 badges issued
	Port Natal	KwaZulu-Natal	Issued to active duty members of the South African Police, Reaction Unit, Port Natal, 1979–2001. This badge was only worn with the Ceremonial Dress. Later during September 1995 when the Camouflaged Uniform was recalled, this badge was also worn with the blue Field Dress Uniform.	111 badges issued
	Port Natal	KwaZulu-Natal	Issued to active duty members of the South African Police, Reaction Unit, Port Natal, 1979–2001. This badge was issued to members who had five years or more active duty experience.	10 badges issued
	Port Natal	KwaZulu-Natal	Issued to active duty members of the South African Police, Reaction Unit, Port Natal, 1979–2002. This badge was issued to members who were on active duty at the time, and remained during the transformation, when the Reaction Unit was closed down, and its members transferred to form the core group of the newly created Tactical Unit known as the Tactical Intervention Group (TIG). The Unit Commander, Operational Commander, Training Commander with seven (7) operators formed part of the new Core Group of TIG.	10 badges issued
	Port Natal	KwaZulu-Natal	Issued to all members of the South African Police, Reaction Unit who attended the Commemorative Ceremony August 2009.	Over 100 badges issued

=== Reaction Units ===
Unit Number	Station	Province	Service duration	Total operators
* RU HQ	Pretoria			
* RU 1	Pretoria (Yankee Zero)			
* RU 2	Johannesburg (Diepkloof)			
* RU 3	Soweto			
* RU 4	Potchefstroom			
* RU 6	Dunottar			
* RU 7	Middleburg TVL			
* RU 8	Pietermaritzburg			
* RU 9	Durban (Call Sign) Tango	Natal	1979-2001	150 members
* RU 10	Maitland / Cape Town	Western Cape	1985-2001	
* RU 12	Port Elizabeth			
* RU 13	East London			
* RU 14	Oudtshoorn			
* RU 15	Kimberley			
* RU 16	Welkom			
* RU 17	Bloemfontein			
* RU 18	Port Shepstone			
* RU 19	National Unit (Rosslyn, Pretoria)			
* RU 20	Colenso			
* RU 21	Newcastle			
* RU 22	Pietersburg			
* RU 25	Alrode			
* RU 27	Rustenburg			
* RU 33	Umfolozi			
* RU 38	Midrand			
* RU 41	Brits			

=== Reaction Unit Commanders ===
Unit Number	Commander	Period
* RU 9	Captain Casper Claase	1979 - 1980
* RU 9	Lieutenant Henk Fourie	1980 - 1981
* RU 9	Warrant Officer Daan Haupt	1981 - 1985
* RU 9	Lieutenant Tony Breytenbach	1986 - 1988
* RU 9	Warrant Officer Tommy Stewart	1988
* RU 9	Lieutenant Robbie Cooke	1988 - 1991
* RU 9	Warrant Officer André Broodryk	1992
* RU 9	Captain Pine Pienaar	1992 - 1997
* RU 9	W/O Keith Lenz	End of 1996 - 1997
* RU 9	Captain Phillip Oberholzer	1997
* RU 9	Captain Mike Vosloo	1997 - 2002

== See also ==
- South African Police Service
- South African Police Service Special Task Force
- National Intervention Unit
- South African Special Forces Brigade
