= Northeast Airlines (disambiguation) =

Northeast Airlines can refer to a number of airlines, including:

- Northeastern International Airways, a United States airline founded on Long Island, New York which operated 1982–1986
- Northeast Airlines, a United States airline which operated 1933–1972, merging into Delta Air Lines
- Northeast Airlines (UK), a British airline which began operations in 1951 as BKS and was merged into British Airways in 1976
- Northeast Express Regional Airlines, a defunct Maine-based regional airline which operated as an affiliate of Northwest Airlines
- Northeast Airlines (China), a defunct airline based in Shenyang, People's Republic of China
- North East Airlines, a defunct airline based in Eswatini
