= 1975 Fox Street siege =

Hostage siege in the Johannesburg Israeli consulate

- Location: Johannesburg, South Africa
- Date: 28–29 April 1975
- Target: Israeli Consulate
- Attack type: Siege, hostage crisis
- Weapon: submachine guns
- Deaths: 4
- Injuries: 6 embassy personnel, 45 pedestrians
- Perpetrators: David Protter; Charles Protter

1975 Fox Street siege occurred at the Israeli consulate in Johannesburg, South Africa in April 1975. Two assistant security officials working at the consulate, David and Charles Protter, Jewish South Africans took control of the consulate personnel as they arrived for work on Monday morning, 28 April. Twenty-one hostages were eventually taken. David Protter had convinced his brother Charles that he was conducting a test of security at the consulate. The head of security was killed soon after he arrived. By late morning, police in Johannesburg became aware of suspicious activity at the consulate but not until gunfire from the consulate started striking pedestrians in the street after midday, confirmed suspicions that the consulate had been seized. Negotiations continued throughout the day and into the early morning of 29 April before all hostages were released and David Protter surrendered and was taken into custody. A total of 4 people, 2 hostages and 2 bystanders, died during the siege.

== Background ==
=== Consulate takeover ===
David Protter, a security member of the Israeli consulate took control of the offices sometime on Sunday or early Monday morning. His brother Charles, also employed there, staffed the lobby allowing the employees to enter through the secure steel doors into the consulate as they reported to work from 8 am. After the siege, Charles was described as impressionable and believed his brother's lies concerning the latter's position in the consulate and what he was doing. The Israeli consulate was located in the Hershleigh building on the fifth floor located in Fox Street, Johannesburg CBD between Von Brandis and Kruis Streets close to the Carlton Centre. David told each person entering, that there was a security exercise happening and were escorted to a secure room. The consulate's head of security, Giora Raviv, was killed shortly after he arrived when got into a struggle with David when he realised what was happening at the consulate. Later in the morning, three children of the hostages arrived after attending a morning cinema on their school day off.

Maurice Kaplan arrived at the consulate around 10:45 am to see vice-consul Shemi Tsur, but was denied entry before persuading Charles Protter who allowed Tsur to see him outside the consulate door. Tsur warned Kaplan that the consulate had been taken over.

Shemi Tsur fled the 5th floor down to the second floor and into the Varig Airlines office looking for help and asking for the police to be called. He was followed by three men, Charles and David Protter and the third was Kaplan. The two claimed they were Israeli security and after a brief struggle the handcuffed Tsur to Vaz Pinto an airline employee. Pinto refused to leave the office and the keys had to be retrieved from the consulate to free Pinto and the Protter's returned Tsur to the consulate.

=== Police suspicions ===
At 11:45, two uniformed police officers arrived at the consulate. A message had been received at the Israeli embassy in Pretoria and in Jerusalem that something was wrong and was forwarded to the police. Constable R.F. Reynders and his partner were sent to investigate and found Charles Protter at his desk in the lobby. He assured them all was okay, there had been no shooting and that an employee's handbag had been stolen. His story was confirmed by David Protter via an intercom after police were refused entry to confirm the story. The police left and reported back to their headquarters.

Around 12:30, the Israeli ambassador contacted Major General Mike Geldenhuys commander of the SAP Security Branch asking him to investigate as the phones were not being answered at the consulate. Geldenhuys sent Detective Sergeant J Maralich from the John Vorster Square Security Branch to investigate personally and was told by Charles Protter the consulate was being decorated and the phones were not working.

=== Shooting begins ===
Soon afterwards, around 1:15pm, as lunch hour began, David started firing his Uzis, from the windows of the consulate, at cars, motorbikes and pedestrians in Fox Street wounding many people. David would move between windows shooting to convince authorities that there was more than one shooter. When police arrived, they assumed positions on the ground and in buildings around the site, firing into the fifth floor and wounding hostages.

Solly Sacks, an El Al security official at Jan Smuts International Airport, took control of communication with the consulate, with loud-hailers and two-way radios, on behalf of the police forces. Through this communication, the claim was made that the consulate had been seized by three Japanese and three Lebanese terrorists, with Protter taking on roles of the terrorist leader in a disguised voice and as well acting personally as a go-between the terrorists and police. Prottor would also use the hostages to call out demands and asking police to stop shooting from the windows of the consulate while still firing throughout the afternoon. One of the many demands shouted from windows by hostages was the terrorists' demand to see Israeli Ambassador Unna and for a doctor to treat the wounded. Dr. Gotlieb volunteered and after three attempts was allowed into the building only dressed in his underwear. Medical equipment was brought up using rope to the fifth floor.

In the late afternoon, Charles Protter left the building and appeared to be studying the building frontage while talking on a two-way radio. He was seized by police and interrogated. He admitted there were no foreign terrorists, and he suspected his brother was responsible for shootings.

Police had finally gained control of the surrounding streets around 4pm, having used police dogs to move the crowd of sightseers back from danger. SADF personnel from 2 Reconnaissance Regiment had also taken up positions as snipers in various buildings but poor radio communication hampered their moves and they had to be careful not to be shot by the police themselves.

By 5pm, Bureau of State Security head Hendrik van den Berg under the orders of Prime Minister John Vorster assumed overall command of the security forces. By 8pm Israeli Ambassador Dr. Yitzhak Unna and South African Justice Minister Jimmy Kruger arrived at the police command post near Fox Street.

Close to 10:30pm, Dr Gotlieb convinced David to release him, Raviv's body and two seriously wounded hostages, Evelyn Dakin and Edwin Molopo. Three stretchers were left in the lobby and the wounded and dead were retrieved. Police interviewed the two in hospital with Dakin too traumatised to answer. Molopo confirmed Protter was armed but was convinced the police were firing on them and Protter was defending them. Gotlieb, who left with Shemi Tsur, was interviewed at the police command post and confirmed to Van den Berg, Unna and Kruger that he had only seen one armed man, David Protter, with 4 Uzis and said he had the building rigged with explosives. The Japanese consul, who arrived early in the evening, was sent away when it was established there was no Red Army Faction involvement.

After more gunfire around midnight and police returning fire, a 5am deadline was made, which if Protter's demands were not met, he would blow up the building. Van den Berg, now convinced there was only one shooter, took direct control of the negotiation. Van den Berg would not heed to the requests for Prottor to see Ambassador Unna nor his demand to taken to the airport by helicopter and flown to Israel. By 4:30am, he had convinced Protter to give himself up and release his hostages. He was immediately arrested.

== Aftermath ==
While in police custody on 3 May, David Protter attempted to commit suicide twice. In July, David was committed to 28 days of psychiatric assessment based on reports of his previous mental health. Protter was later charged with murder, kidnapping, unlawful possession of firearms, while his brother Charles was charged with kidnapping, unlawful possession of firearms.

Soon after the siege ended, the Israeli government began to investigate Protter's background. It was established that he was an Austrian-born Jew whose family had settled in South Africa. In 1967, David was sent to Israel on a Jewish Agency study program. While in Israel, he attempted to jump from a roof and cut his wrists, which lead to him being sent home. On the way to the airport to return home, he stabbed himself and was hospitalised before being returned to South Africa. He returned to Israel in 1971 and joined the army in 1972, but was discharged after three months due to mental health reasons. He was then arrested and imprisoned for impersonating an Israeli paratrooper officer, although he continued the act several more times until he returned to South Africa. Later he was employed at the consulate as a security assistant with no access to weapons with no background check made of his history in Israel.

== Trial ==
The two brothers pleaded guilty to most of the charges, but David Protter pleaded not guilty to the murder of Giora Raviv, admitting it was a culpable homicide and claiming it occurred during a struggle. The senior State Pathologist J.J.F. Taljaardt disputed the claim as a second autopsy showed a bullet wound in the back and two in the chest.

David Protter was found guilty of murdering the Israeli consulate official and was sentenced on 12 November 1975 to 25 years in jail. His brother Charles, was sentenced to 5 years in jail with 30 months commuted.

David Protter was released from prison in July 1991.

== Police organisational changes ==
In 1976, based on lessons learnt and concerns about the police management of the siege, the South African Police Service formed the Special Task Force group to respond to urban terrorism, aircraft hijackings, and hostage situations.

== Media ==
SABC television would begin test transmissions on 5 May 1975 and would broadcast vision from the week-old event on its first news broadcast. Cliff Saunders and a camera operator had rushed to the scene when the first information of a hostage siege became known to the SABC.
