= Swazi Airways =

Airline based in Manzini, Swaziland

IATA	ICAO	Call sign
-	-	-
- Founded: 2016
- Ceased operations: 2017
- Hubs: King Mswati III International Airport (Manzini)
- Fleet size: 1
- Parent company: Royal Swazi National Airways Corporation (RSNAC)
- Key people: Guillermo Barrios, acting CEO; Nokuthula Mthembu, chairman of RSNAC
- Website: flyswazi.com

Swazi Airways was a Swazi airline based at King Mswati III International Airport in Manzini. It is the successor to Royal Swazi National Airways and is fully owned by the Swaziland Government. The airline had stated in September 2016 that it would commence flights in November, flying from Manzini to destinations in South Africa and Zimbabwe. It was closed down in July 2017.

== History ==
In 2013, the Royal Swazi National Airways Corporation was revived in order to create a new national airline. The former flag carrier of Swaziland, Royal Swazi National Airways, had collapsed in 1999. The Ministry of Public Works and Transport appointed Nokuthula Mthembu as chairman of the corporation.

The airline was revived to transform King Mswati III International Airport into a regional airline hub, which had opened in March 2014 but suffered from under-utilisation.

In early 2014, the Swaziland Government signed bilateral agreements with ten countries, nine in Africa and one in the Middle East, in order to secure air traffic rights between the nations.

Swazi Airways took delivery of a Boeing 737-300 in February 2016. However, in September the airline said that it would begin operations in November using regional, 50-seater aircraft. Short-haul flights to South Africa and Zimbabwe were to be operated initially.

== Corporate affairs ==
Swazi Airways was a subsidiary of the Royal Swazi National Airways Corporation, which is fully owned by the Swaziland Government. The acting CEO of the airline was Guillermo Barrios, a Venezuelan-Canadian.

== Destinations ==
Swazi Airways planned to operate flights from its Manzini hub to Durban, Cape Town, and Harare.

== Fleet ==
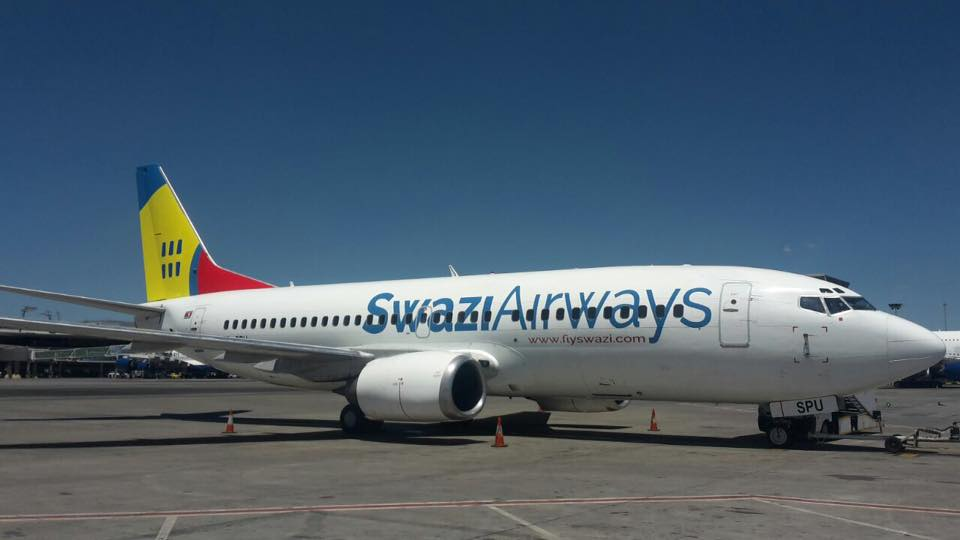
Swazi Airways Boeing 737-300

Swazi Airways obtained a single Boeing 737-300 in February 2016, but it planned to launch operations with 50-seater regional aircraft.

== See also ==
- Royal Swazi National Airways
