= Eswatini Air =

Flag carrier of Eswatini

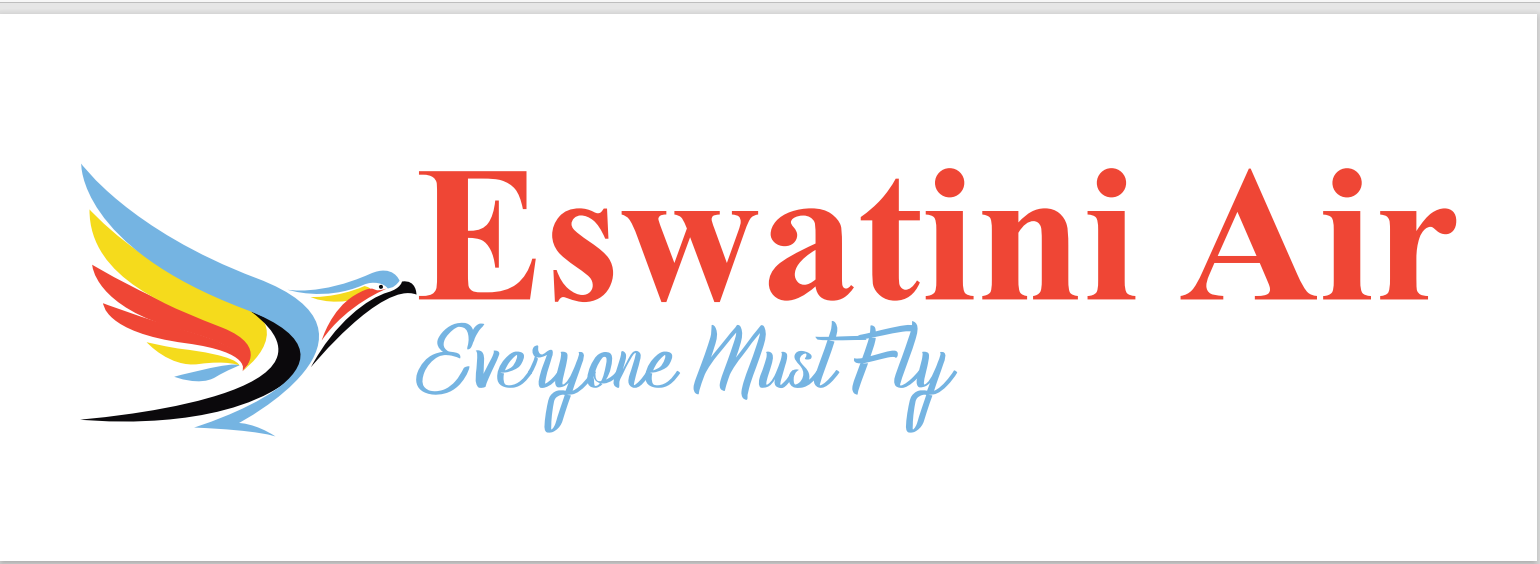
IATA	ICAO	Call sign
RN	SZL	ESWATINI
- Founded: 21 December 2021; 4 years ago
- Commenced operations: 26 March 2023; 3 years ago
- Hubs: King Mswati III International Airport
- Fleet size: 4
- Destinations: 5
- Parent company: RENAC
- Headquarters: Manzini, Eswatini
- Key people: Qiniso Dhlamini (CEO)
- Website: https://eswatiniair.co.sz/

Eswatini Air is an Eswatini-based airline and the flag carrier for the nation. Originally planning to commence operations in June 2022, the airline secured an AOC in December 2022 after some delays. Operations commenced on 26 March 2023 with twice-daily flights to Johannesburg, with the necessary foreign operator permits granted by South Africa. Harare, Zimbabwe was added in April 2023, and Durban and Cape Town were added to the network by June 2023.

== Destinations ==
Eswatini Air flies to and plans to fly to the following destinations as of April 2023:

Country / Territory	City	Airport	Notes	Refs
Eswatini	Manzini	King Mswati III International Airport	Hub	
South Africa	Cape Town	Cape Town International Airport		
South Africa	Durban	King Shaka International Airport		
South Africa	Johannesburg	O. R. Tambo International Airport		
Zimbabwe	Harare	Robert Gabriel Mugabe International Airport		

=== Interline agreements ===
- APG Airlines
- Hahn Air

== Fleet ==
=== Current fleet ===
As of July 2026, Eswatini Air operates the following aircraft:

Eswatini Air fleet
Aircraft	In service	Orders	Notes
Airbus A340-300	1	–	
Embraer ERJ 145	2	–	
McDonnell Douglas MD-87	1	–	
Total	4	–	

=== Former fleet ===
As of August 2025, Eswatini Air operated 2 Embraer ERJ 145:

== See also ==
- List of airlines of Eswatini
