= African International Airways =

South African airline

IATA	ICAO	Call sign
–	AIN	FLY CARGO
- Founded: 1985
- Ceased operations: 2008
- Hubs: OR Tambo International Airport; Kent International Airport; Ostend-Bruges International Airport
- Fleet size: 4 (at closure)
- Parent company: African International Airways (Pty) Ltd.
- Headquarters: Johannesburg, South Africa
- Key people: PJM Corbin and JL Warburton McBride (76 percent majority owners)
- Website: http://www.aiaflycargo.com/

African International Airways was an all-cargo airline based in Johannesburg, South Africa. The airline operated international chartered cargo flights out of Kent International Airport, United Kingdom, OR Tambo International Airport, Johannesburg and Ostend-Bruges International Airport, Belgium, most of which were on behalf of Intavia Limited.

== History ==
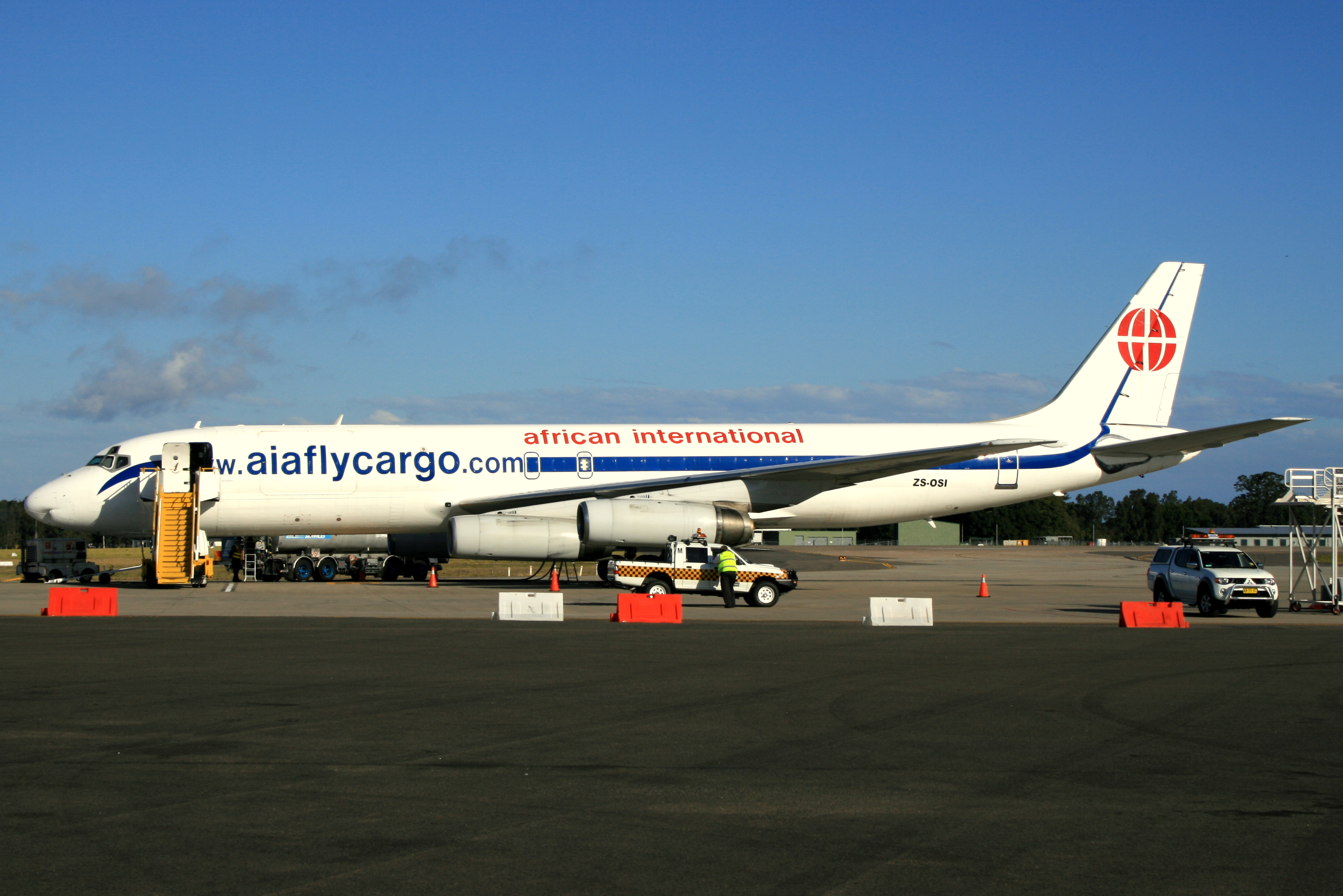
An African International Airways Douglas DC-8-62

African International Airways was established and started operations in 1985 in Swaziland. A commercial alliance with South African carrier Executive Aerospace was established in 2002. In late 2008, African International Airways was shut down.

The most notable airlines African International Airlines was operating for were Alitalia (1985–1996), and later South African Airways and British Airways World Cargo.

== Fleet ==
At March 2007, the African International Airways fleet included the following aircraft:

- 2 Douglas DC-8-54F
- 2 Douglas DC-8-62F
- 1 Douglas DC-8-62F Flown to Kemble and broken down for spares/scrap

One of the DC-8s (ZS-OZV) Is abandoned at Cape Town Airport.
