= Royal Swazi National Airways =

Airline of Swaziland

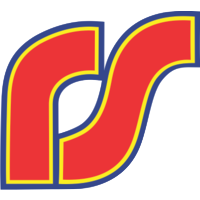
IATA	ICAO	Call sign
ZC	RSN	ROYAL SWAZI
- Founded: 1978
- Commenced operations: 1 August 1978
- Ceased operations: 12 April 1999
- Hubs: Matsapha Airport, Manzini
- Headquarters: Mbabane, Eswatini

Royal Swazi National Airways Corporation was the national airline of the Kingdom of Swaziland. Headquartered in Mbabane with its operational base at Matsapha Airport near Manzini, the airline was founded in 1978. The company, renamed the Royal Eswatini National Airways Corporation (RENAC) in 2018, continued to exist as a ground services provider until it resumed flight operations in 2023 under the name Eswatini Air.

== History ==
In March 1978, the government of Swaziland announced that it was setting up a national airline to be known as Royal Swazi National Airways Corporation, and informed the privately-owned Swazi Air that it would be required to close down operations by 1 August 1978. In mid-1978 it was announced that Royal Swazi had purchased a 63-seat Fokker F28-3000 from Fokker with which it would begin its services. F28 pilots were among other technical assistance. The airline also acquired a low-cycle Vickers Viscount 839 which had previously been operated by the Iranian government and the Sultan of Oman's Air Force.

On 1 August 1978, the airline inaugurated its services with the F28 on a flight from Manzini to Johannesburg via Durban, whilst the airlines' Viscount was on standby at Matsapha Airport. Services to Lusaka, Mauritius and Blantyre were expected to be added to the fledgling airline's route network. The airline made headlines when on 25 November 1981 a group of 44 mercenaries led by Mike Hoare boarded a scheduled Royal Swazi National Airways flight in Manzini to Mahé in the Seychelles in an attempt to overthrow Seychellois President France-Albert René. The mercenaries disguised themselves as Ancient Order of Froth Blowers rugby players and fans, but were exposed as they passed through customs when an alert official discovered a dismantled AK-47 in one of the mercenaries' luggage. The Royal Swazi National Airways F28 was damaged in the ensuing firefight between Seychellois officials and the mercenaries at Seychelles International Airport. After the incident, the airline ceased flights to the Seychelles.

By 1993 the airline served a route network that included Cape Town, Dar es Salaam, Harare, Gaborone, Johannesburg, Maseru, Lusaka, Maputo and Nairobi, of which the Manzini–Johannesburg route was the airlines' busiest. On 4 July 1993, the scheduled flight between Maputo and Manzini was hijacked by a Mozambican passenger armed with an AK-47. Not long after the aircraft departed Maputo, the hijacker stormed the cockpit with his gun, and demanded to be flown to Australia. When told that Australia was too far for the aircraft to fly, he insisted on being flown to Maseru in Lesotho. With Maseru Airport being closed, and the aircraft being low on fuel, the crew flew to Johannesburg. Three hours after arriving in Johannesburg, South African Police stormed the aircraft. The Captain and one passenger were injured in the crossfire and the hijacker was shot in the head but survived.

In 1994, the airline leased a Fokker 100 in a 12 business class and 85 economy class configuration, but it was returned to its lessor in 1996 and onward leased to Linhas Aéreas de Moçambique. The same airline Royal Swazi leased a Boeing 737-200 from several years earlier. Royal Swazi National Airways, which at the time was owned by the Swazi government and Tibiyo Taka Ngwane, a trust managed by King Mswati III, ceased operations to Harare, Lusaka, Dar es Salaam and Nairobi on 12 April 1999. The Swazi government then signed an agreement with SA Airlink on 25 April for the South African airline to take a 40% stake in a new venture, with the government holding the remaining 60%. It became known as Swaziland Airlink. Swaziland Airlink began operations in July 1999 with a Fokker F28 leased from the company.

The company still exists, as of 2018 under the name Royal Eswatini National Airways Corporation (RENAC). Although it does not own its own airline, it provides charter brokerage and ground handling services, as well as operating two travel agencies in Mbabane and Matsapha and acting as an airline ticket broker. Still wholly owned by the government, Royal Swazi National Airways Corporation operates independently under the Ministry of Public Works and Transport, with a board appointed by the Minister. In August 2009 it was revealed that the government owed the company some E13.1 million for air travel accumulated by 16 government ministries and departments.

== Fleet ==
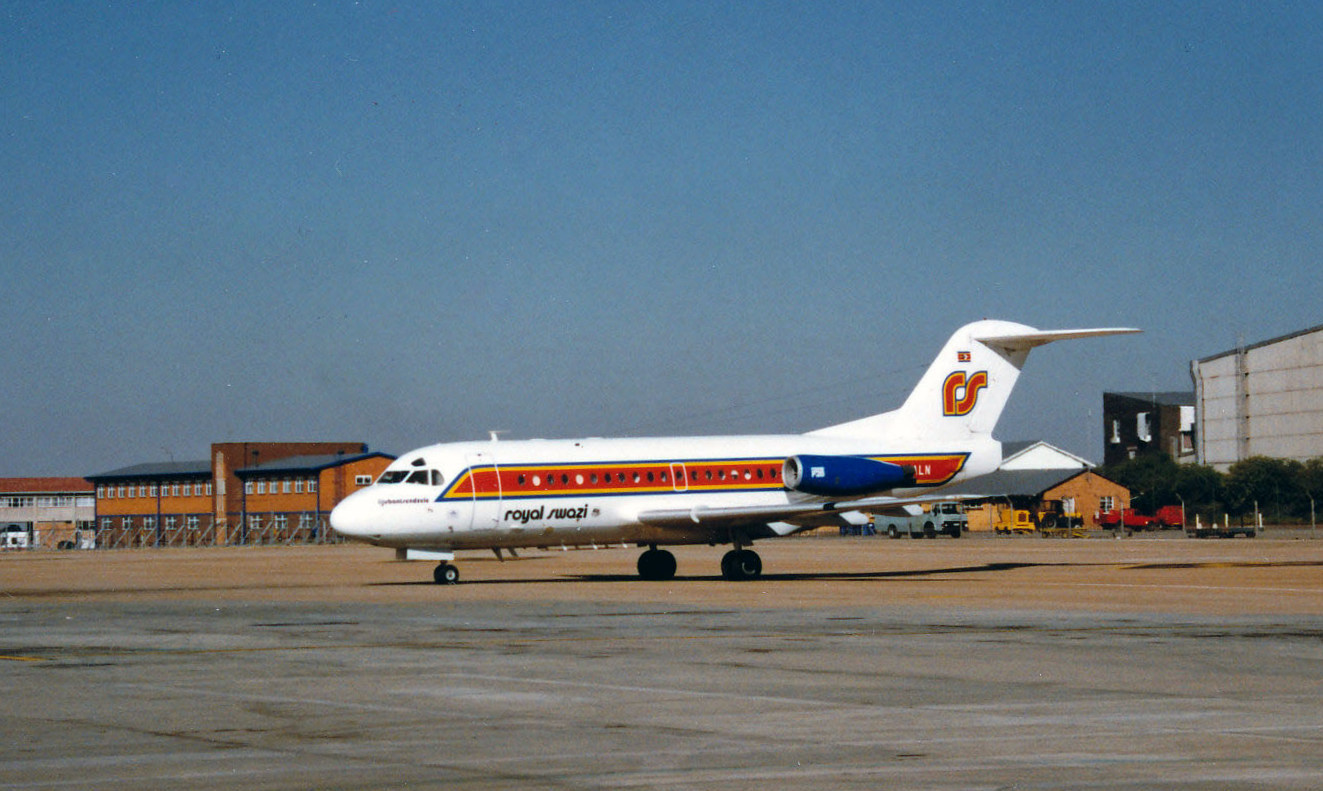
Royal Swazi Fokker F.28 "Lijubantsendzele" in Manzini

This was the fleet through its existence:

Aircraft	In Fleet	Notes
Fokker F.28 Mk.3000	1	Damaged in the 1981 Seychelles coup attempt
Fokker 100	1	Leased In
Vickers Viscount 839	1	Bought from Swazi Air
Boeing 737-200	1	Leased In
Fairchild Metro III	1	Leased In

== See also ==
- Swazi Airways
