= Urban terrorism =

Targeted use of terrorism in urban populations

Urban terrorism is the targeted use of terrorism in urban populations in order to cause the most harm, injury, death, or property damage. Since urban areas have significantly higher population densities than rural areas, targeting those areas can maximize the effect of the terrorist attack.

== Examples ==
A variety of methods for committing urban terrorism have been employed in recent history including car bombs, explosive vests, and in the case of the September 11 attacks, hijacked airplanes.

=== February 26, 1993 World Trade Center bombing ===
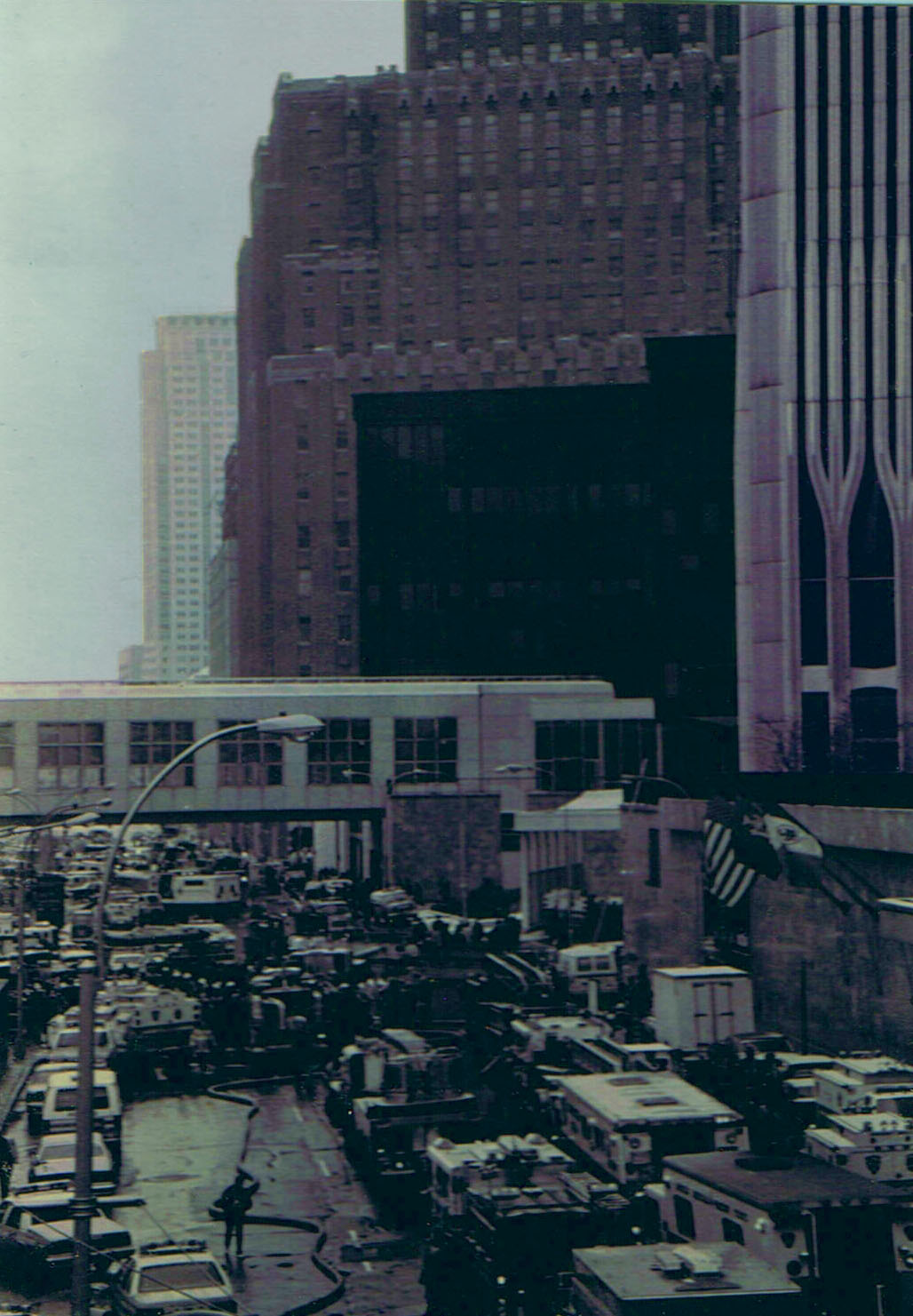
The procession of emergency vehicles immediately following the 1993 bombing

On February 26, 1993, at 12:17 p.m., a Ryder truck filled with 1,500 pounds (680 kg) of explosives, planted by Ramzi Yousef, detonated in the underground garage of the North Tower in Lower Manhattan, New York City, United States. The blast opened a 100-foot (30 m) hole through five sublevels with the greatest damage occurring on levels B1 and B2 and significant structural damage on level B3. Six people were killed, over 1,000 were injured and 50,000 other workers and visitors were left gasping for air within the 110 story towers. Many people inside the North Tower were forced to walk down darkened stairwells that contained no emergency lighting, some taking two hours or more to reach safety.

Yousef fled to Pakistan after the bombing but was arrested in Islamabad in February 1995, and was extradited back to the United States to face trial. Sheikh Omar Abdel Rahman was convicted in 1996 for involvement in the bombing and other plots. Yousef and Eyad Ismoil were convicted in November 1997 for their carrying out the bombing. Four others had been convicted in May 1994 for their involvement in the 1993 bombing. According to a presiding judge, the conspirators' chief aim at the time of the attack was to destabilize the north tower and send it crashing into the south tower, toppling both landmarks.

=== September 11, 2001 attacks ===
The September 11 attacks (often referred to as September 11th or 9/11) were a series of coordinated suicide attacks by al-Qaeda. On that morning, 19 al-Qaeda terrorists hijacked four commercial passenger jet airliners. The hijackers intentionally crashed two of the airliners into the Twin Towers of the World Trade Center in New York City, killing everyone on board and many others working in the buildings. Both buildings collapsed within two hours, destroying nearby buildings and damaging others. The hijackers crashed a third airliner into the Pentagon in Arlington, Virginia, just outside Washington, D.C. The fourth plane crashed into a field near Shanksville in rural Pennsylvania after some of its passengers and flight crew attempted to retake control of the plane, which the hijackers had redirected toward Washington, D.C., in an attempted attack on the United States Capitol. There were no survivors from any of the flights.

The death toll of the attacks was 2,973, including the 19 hijackers. The overwhelming majority of casualties were civilians, including nationals of over 70 countries. In addition, there is at least one secondary death – one person was ruled by a medical examiner to have died from lung disease due to exposure to dust from the World Trade Center's collapse.

=== April 15, 2013 Boston Marathon bombing ===
On April 15, 2013, two pressure cooker bombs planted by Dzhokhar Tsarnaev and Tamerlan Tsarnaev were detonated near the crowded finish line of the Boston Marathon, which was held on Boston’s 238th annual Patriots' Day. Two explosions took place at the 4:09 mark of the race, approximately ten seconds apart. Three people were killed, including an 8 year old child. 264 people were injured, and according to reports at the time, seventeen of them critically. "At this time there are no claims of responsibility," FBI officials initially said in a press conference on April 16. "The range of suspects and motives remains wide open." On April 19, 2013, Dzhokhar Tsarnaev was arrested, and convicted on April 8, 2015.
