= List of shrines =

This is a list of the more notable religious shrines around the world.

== Africa ==
=== Algeria ===
- Notre Dame d'Afrique, Algiers

=== Cameroon ===
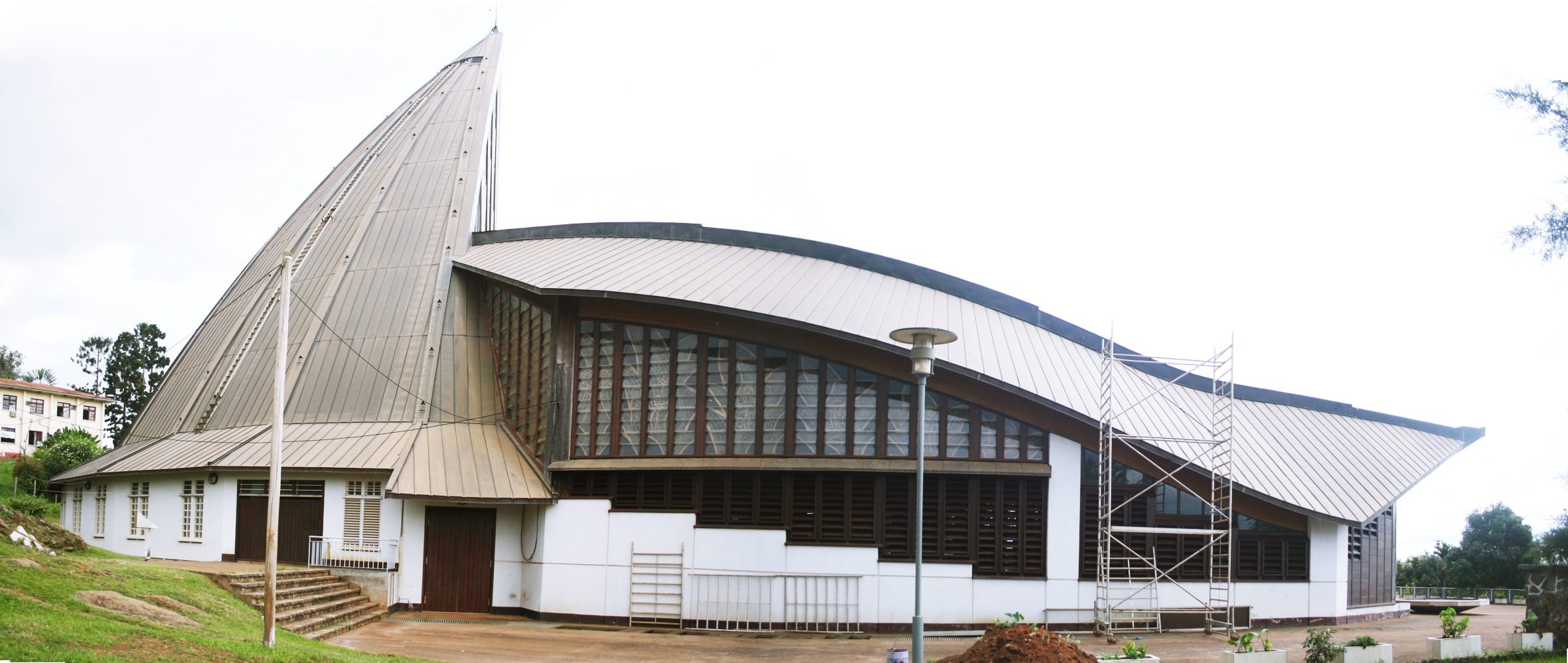
- External view of the Mary Queen of the Apostles Basilica in Yaounde, Cameroon
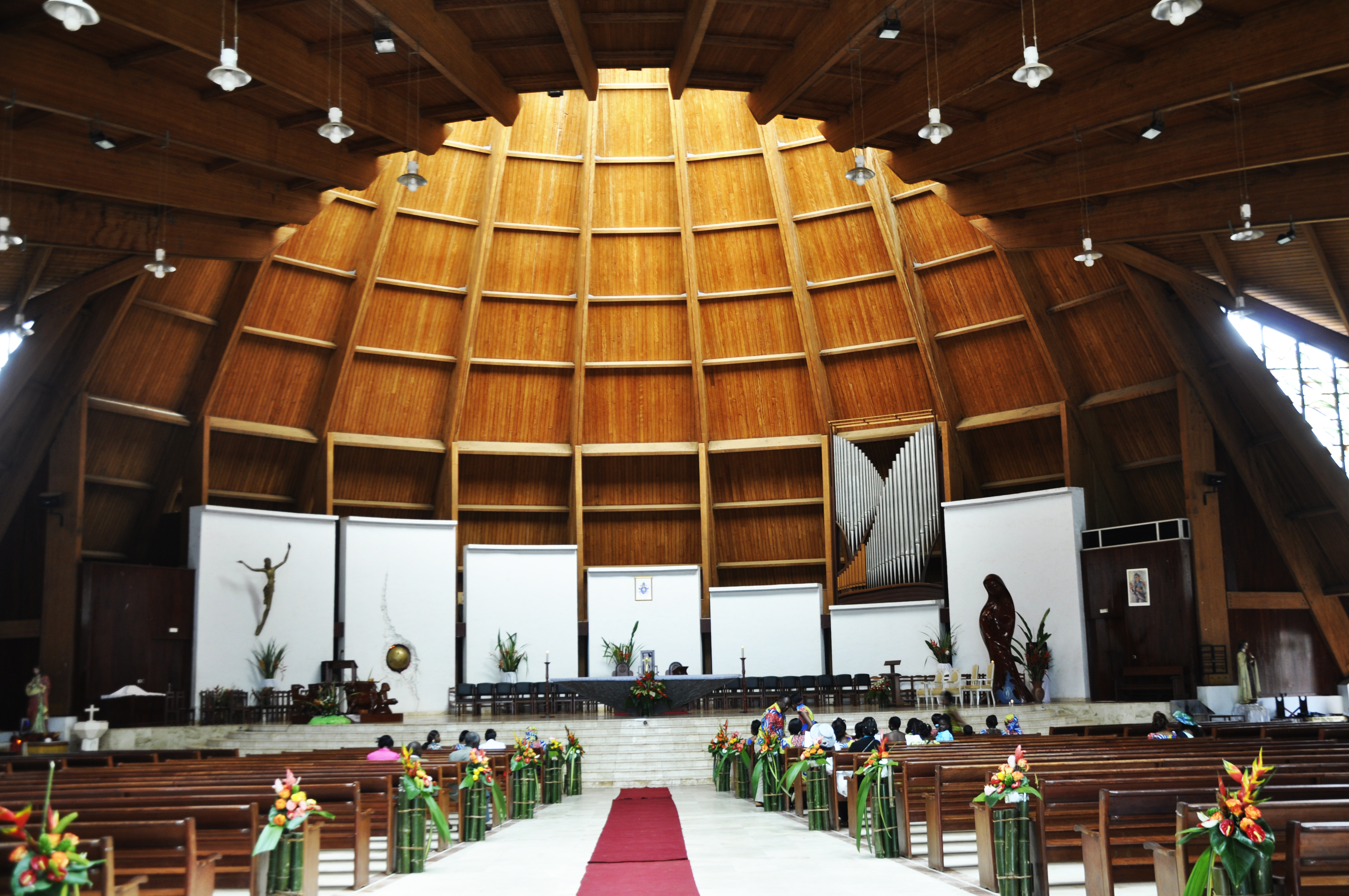
  Interior view of the Mary Queen of the Apostles Basilica in Yaounde, Cameroon
  Basilique Marie-Reine-des-Apôtres (Mary Queen of the Apostles Basilica) in Yaoundé.

=== Egypt ===
- Our Lady of Assiut, Assiut
- Our Lady of Zeiton, Cairo
- Our Lady of Warraq, Giza
- Monastery of Saint Macarius the Great, Shrine of Saint John the Baptist & Elisha the Prophet
- Monastery of Saint Macarius the Great, Shrine of Saints Macarius the Great, Macarius of Alexandria, Macarius of the Bishop
- Syrian Monastery, Egypt, Shrine of Mary Magdalene
- Saint Mark's Coptic Orthodox Cathedral (Alexandria), Shrine of Saint Mark the Evangelist
- Saint Mark's Coptic Orthodox Cathedral, Cairo, Shrine of Saint Athanasius
- Paromeos Monastery, Shrine of Saints Maximus & Domitius
- White Monastery, Shrine of Saint Shenouda the Archimandrite
- Monastery of Saint Mina, Shrine of Pope Cyril VI & Saint Menas
- Saint Mercurius Church in Coptic Cairo, Shrine of Mother Irini
- Monastery of Saint Pishoy, Shrine of Pope Shenouda III

=== Rwanda ===
- Shrine of Our Lady of Sorrows, Kibeho

=== South Africa ===
- Ngome Marian Shrine in Ngome, KwaZulu-Natal

=== Kenya ===
- National Marian shrine - Subukia.

== Asia ==
=== Cyprus ===
- The Holy Monastery of the Virgin of Kykkos, near Pedoulas, Nicosia District

=== India ===
- National Chrine of Saint Thomas, Chennai, Tamil Nadu.
- Basilica of Bom Jesus, Goa Velha, Goa
- Sanctuary of Our Lady of Velankanni
- Basilica of Our Lady of the Mount, Bandra, Mumbai
- Saint Mary’s Basilica, Bengaluru, Karnataka
- Shrine of St. Jude Church, Jhansi
- Basilica of Our Lady of Snow (Manjumatha), Pallipport, Pallippuram, Ernakulam, Kerala
- Basilica of Our Lady of Snow, Tuticorin, Tamil Nadu
- Shirine of Saiyed Murad Shahid Datar bawa Gujarat
- Church of Our Lady of Snow, Kallikulam, Tamil Nadu
- Church of Our Lady of Red Sand, Sokkankudiyiruppu, Tamil Nadu
- Korattymuthy Shrine of Our Lady with Poovan Bananas, Koratty, Kerala
- St. Sebastian's International Shrine, Alleppey, Kerala
- Saint Thomas Church Thumpoly, Alappuzha, Kerala.
- St. Lawrence Shrine, Karkala, Karnataka
- Malayattoor in Kerala, of the Syro-Malabar Catholic Church - One of the seven international shrines designated by the Vatican.
- National Shrine Basilica of Our Lady of Ransom, Vallarpadom, Ernakulam
- Our Lady of Lourdes Shrine, Villianur, Puducherry
- Our Lady of Assumption Church, Poomkavu, Alappuzha, Kerala.
- Basilica of Our Lady of Lourdes, Poondi, Tamil Nadu
- Shrine of St. Antony of Padua, Kaloor, Ernakulam
- St. George's Forane Church, Edappally, Edappally, Ernakulam

=== Iran ===
- Fatima Masumeh Shrine, Qom – tomb of Fātimah al-Ma‘sūmah, sister of the Eighth Twelver Shī‘ah Imām Imamzadeh Hamzeh Mosque in Tabriz
- Imām Ridhā Shrine, Mashhad – tomb of the Eighth Twelver Shī‘ah Imām
- Shah Abdol-Azim Shrine, Rey – tomb of Abd al-Azim al-Hasani, as well as other notable individuals, including royalty

=== Iraq ===
- Abdul Qadir Gilani, Baghdad, tomb of the most famous Sufi saint, Highly respected in Sunni Muslims, especially Sufism. Founder of Qadriyya Lineage
- Al-Askari Mosque, Samarra – tomb of the Tenth and Eleventh Twelver Shī‘ah Imāms
- Al-Kadhimiya Mosque, Kadhimiya – tomb of the Seventh and Ninth Twelver Shī‘ah Imāms
- Al Abbas Mosque, Karbala – tomb of ‘Abbās, the brother of Husayn
- Imam Ali Mosque, Najaf – tomb of Ali, the cousin of Muhammad and First Shī‘ah Imām
- Imam Husayn Shrine, Karbala, Iraq – tomb of Husayn, the son of Ali, grandson of Muhammad and Third Twelver Shī‘ah Imām

=== Israel ===
- Dome of the Rock, Jerusalem
- Shrine of the Báb in Haifa
- Shrine of Bahá'u'lláh in Acre
- Basilica of the Annunciation, in Nazareth.

=== Japan ===
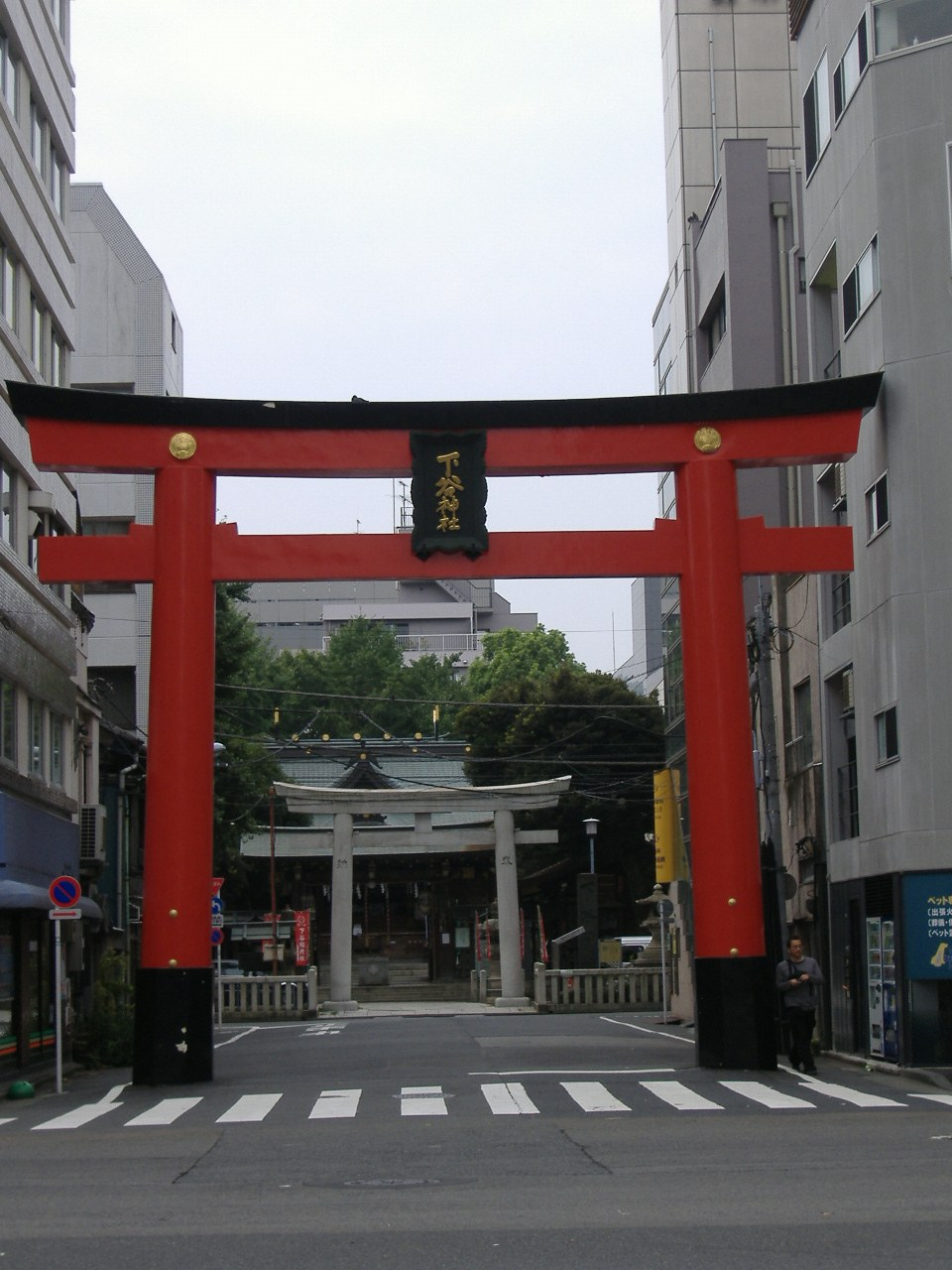
Shitaya Jinja Shrine. Tokyo

- Fushimi Inari-taisha (伏見稲荷大社, Fushimi Inari-taisha) in Kyoto.
- Hakozaki Shrine (筥崎宮, Hakozaki-gū) in Fukuoka.
- Hiyoshi Taisha (日吉大社, Hiyoshi Taisha) in Ōtsu, Shiga Prefecture.
- Ise Shrine (伊勢神宮, Ise-jingū) in Ise, Mie Prefecture.
- Isonokami Shrine (石上神宮, Isonokami-jingū) in Tenri, Nara Prefecture.
- Iwashimizu Hachiman-gū (石清水八幡宮, Iwashimizu Hachiman-gū) in Yawata, Kyoto Prefecture.
- Izumo Taisha (出雲大社, Izumo Taisha) in Izumo, Shimane Prefecture.
- Japanese Martyrs Shrine (日本二十六聖人記念館, Nihon nijūroku seijin Kinenkan) in Nagasaki, Nagasaki Prefecture.
- Kamo Shrine (賀茂神社, Kamo-jinja) in Kyoto.
- Kashihara Shrine (橿原神宮, Kashihara Jingū) in Kashihara, Nara Prefecture.
- Kashima Shrine (鹿島神宮, Kashima-jingū) in Kashima, Ibaraki Prefecture.
- Kasuga Shrine (春日大社, Kasuga Taisha) in Nara.
- Kumano Hayatama Taisha (熊野速玉大社, Kumano Hayatama Taisha) in Shingu, Wakayama Prefecture.
- Kumano Hongū Taisha (熊野本宮大社, Kumano Hongū Taisha) in Tanabe, Wakayama Prefecture.
- Matsunoo Shrine (松尾大社, Matsunoo Taisha) in Kyoto.
- Munakata Taisha (宗像大社, Munakata Taisha) in Munakata, Fukuoka Prefecture.
- Our Lady of Akita, Akita.
- Usa Shrine (宇佐神宮, Usa-jingū) in Usa, Ōita Prefecture.

=== Lebanon ===
- Our Lady of Bechouat Sanctuary, Beqaa Valley
- Our Lady of Lebanon Shrine, Harissa
- Our Lady of Mantara Shrine, Maghdouché
- Our Lady of Miziara, Mother of Mercies, Miziara, Zgharta District
- Our Lady of Nourieh Shrine and Monastery, Hamat
- Our Lady of Zahle and the Bekaa Chapel, Zahlé

=== Pakistan ===
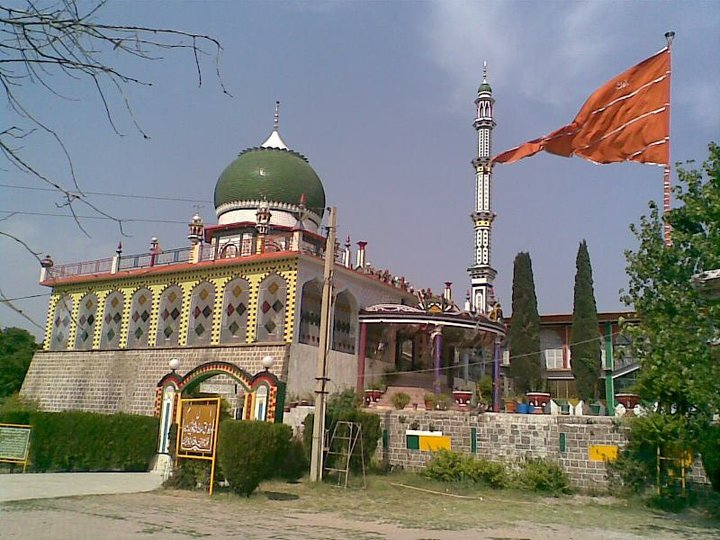

- Chisht Nagar
- Fariduddin Ganjshakar
- Daata Darbar (Ali Hujwiri mausoleum), Lahore
- Bari Imam Shrine, Islamabad
- National Marian Shrine, Mariamabad
- Shrine Of Allo Mahar sharif Tomb of Syed Faiz-ul Hassan Shah and Pir Syed Amin Shah in Allo Mahar, Sialkot.
- Lal Shahbaz Qalandar, Sehwan
- Bibi Pak Daman
- Sultan ul Arifeen Hazrat Syed Rakhyal Shah Sufi Al Qadri
- Shrine of Shah Abdul Latif Bhittai
- Shrine of Baba Farid
- Shrine of Lal Shah Bari
- Shrine of Jalaluddin Bukhari

=== Palestine ===
- Church of All Nations, Jerusalem
- Church of the Nativity, Bethlehem
- Dome of the Rock, Jerusalem
- Church of the Sepulchre of Saint Mary, Jerusalem

=== Philippines ===
- Cathedral-Basilica of the Immaculate Conception, Manila
- Diocesan Shrine of Nuestra Señora del Buen Suceso, Parañaque, Metro Manila
- Diocesan Shrine of St. Joseph Parish known as the Bamboo Organ Church, Las Piñas, Metro Manila
- Diocesan Shrine of the Five Wounds of Our Lord Jesus Christ, Las Piñas, Metro Manila
- International Shrine of Our Lady of Peace and Good Voyage, known as the Antipolo Church, Antipolo, Rizal
- Mary, Queen of Peace Shrine, Quezon City, Metro Manila
- National Shrine of Our Lady of Fatima, Valenzuela City, Metro Manila
- National Shrine of Our Mother of Perpetual Help, Baclaran, Parañaque, Metro Manila
- Our Lady of Caysasay Shrine, Taal, Batangas
- Our Lady of Immaculate Conception Basilica, Malolos, Bulacan
- Our Lady of Peñafrancia Basilica, Naga City, Camarines Sur
- Our Lady of Piat Shrine, Piat, Cagayan
- Our Lady of the Rosary of Manaoag, Manaoag, Pangasinan
- National Shrine of Our Lady of the Visitation of Guibang, Gamu, Isabela
- Minor Basilica of the Black Nazarene, Quiapo, Manila
- Minor Basilica of Our Lady of the Assumption, Santa Maria, Ilocos Sur

=== Saudi Arabia ===
- Masjid al-Nabawi, Medina - tomb of the Islamic Prophet Muhammad

=== Sri Lanka ===
- Basilica of Our Lady of Lanka, in Tewatte, Ragama
- Shrine of Our Lady of Madhu in Mannar district
- Shrine of Our Lady of Matara in Matara
- Katirkamam Murugan temple, Kathirgama

=== Syria ===
- Our Lady of Saidnaya Monastery, Saidnaya
- Sayyidah Zaynab Mosque, Damascus – tomb of Zaynab, the sister of Husayn
- Sayyidah Ruqayya Mosque, Damascus – tomb of Fātimah (commonly referred to by the titles: Ruqayya, Sukayna, and Sakina), the daughter of Husayn

=== Turkey ===
- Church of St. Mary of the Spring, Istanbul
- House of the Virgin Mary, Mt. Bülbüldağı near Selçuk

=== Vietnam ===
- Lý Bát Đế Shrine in Từ Sơn, Bắc Ninh Province
- Our Lady of La Vang in Quảng Trị

== Europe ==
=== Andorra ===
- Our Lady of Meritxell, Meritxell, Canillo

=== Austria ===
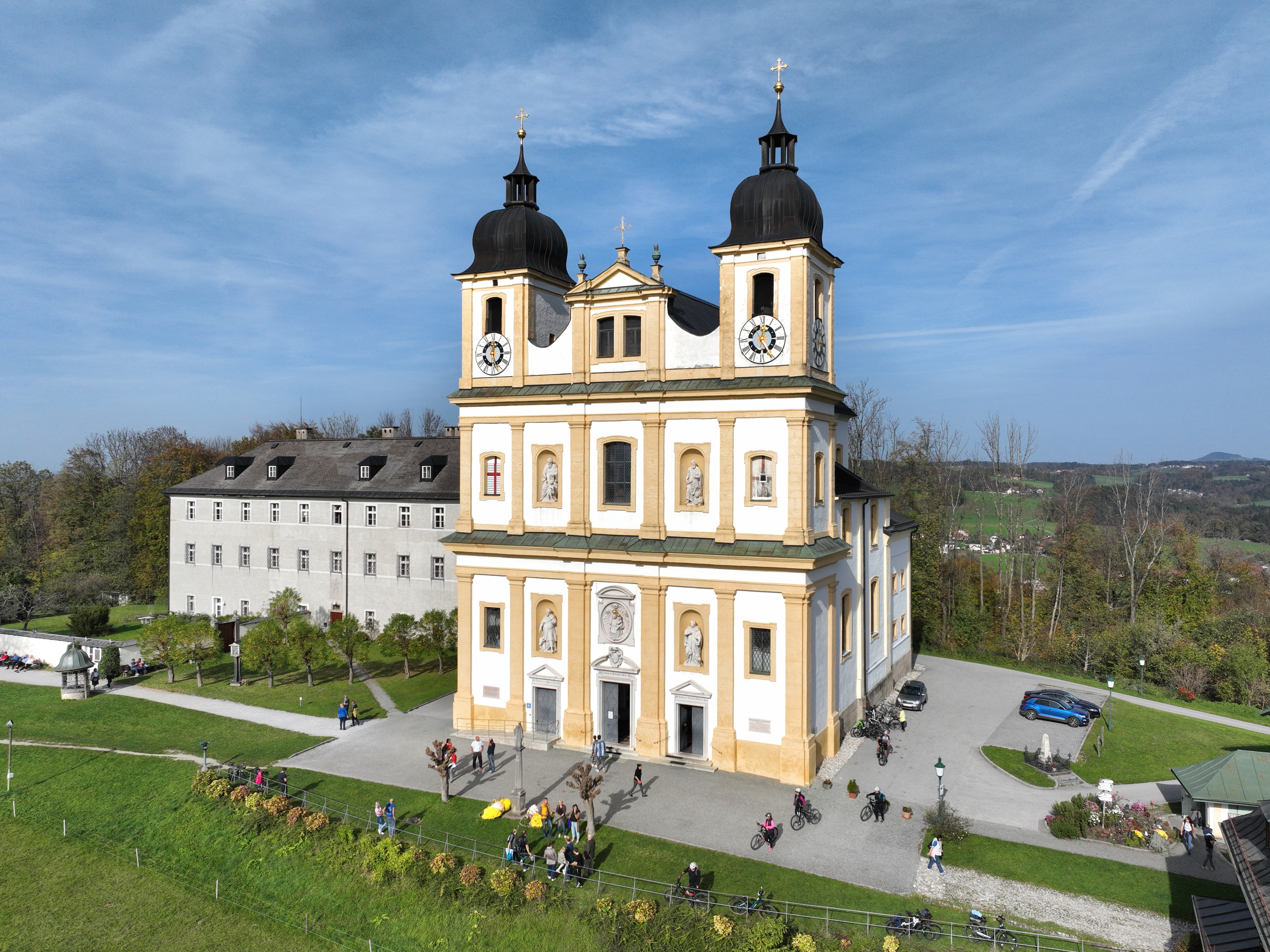
Maria Plain Basilica

- Maria Absam Basilica (St. Michael the Archangel Basilica), Absam, Innsbruck-Land District, Tyrol
- Maria Plain Basilica of Our Lady of the Assumption, Bergheim, Salzburg
- Maria Schmolln Sanctuary, Maria Schmolln, Braunau am Inn District, Upper Austria
- Maria Taferl Basilica, Maria Taferl, Melk District, Lower Austria
- Mariatrost Basilica, Mariatrost, District of Graz, Styria
- Mariazell Basilica of the Birth of the Virgin Mary, Mariazell, Styria

=== Belgium ===
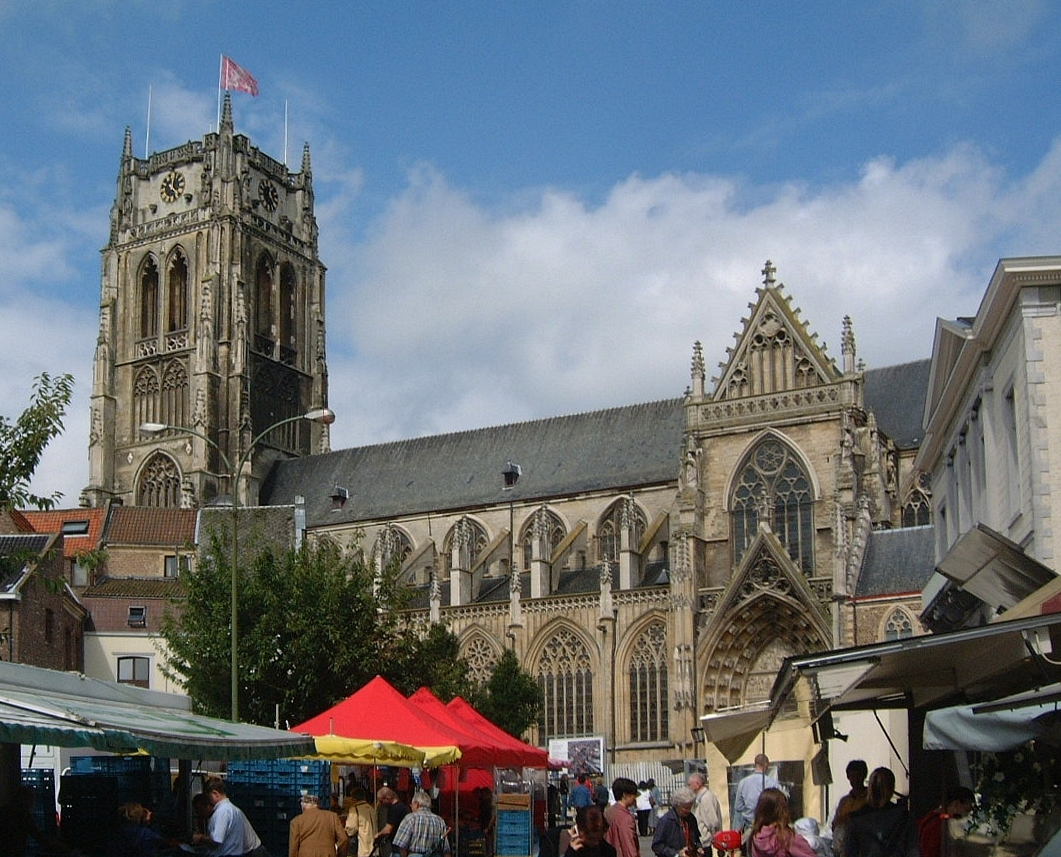
Our Lady of Tongeren Basilica

- Our Lady of Banneux Chapel, Banneux, Liège
- Our Lady of Beauraing Shrine, Beauraing, Namur
- Our Lady of Halle Basilica (Basilica of Saint Martin), Halle, Flemish Brabant
- Our Lady of Scherpenheuvel Basilica, Scherpenheuvel-Zichem, Flemish Brabant
- St. Mary of Oostakker Shrine, Oostakker, Ghent
- Our Lady of Tongeren Basilica, Tongeren, Limburg

=== Bosnia and Herzegovina ===
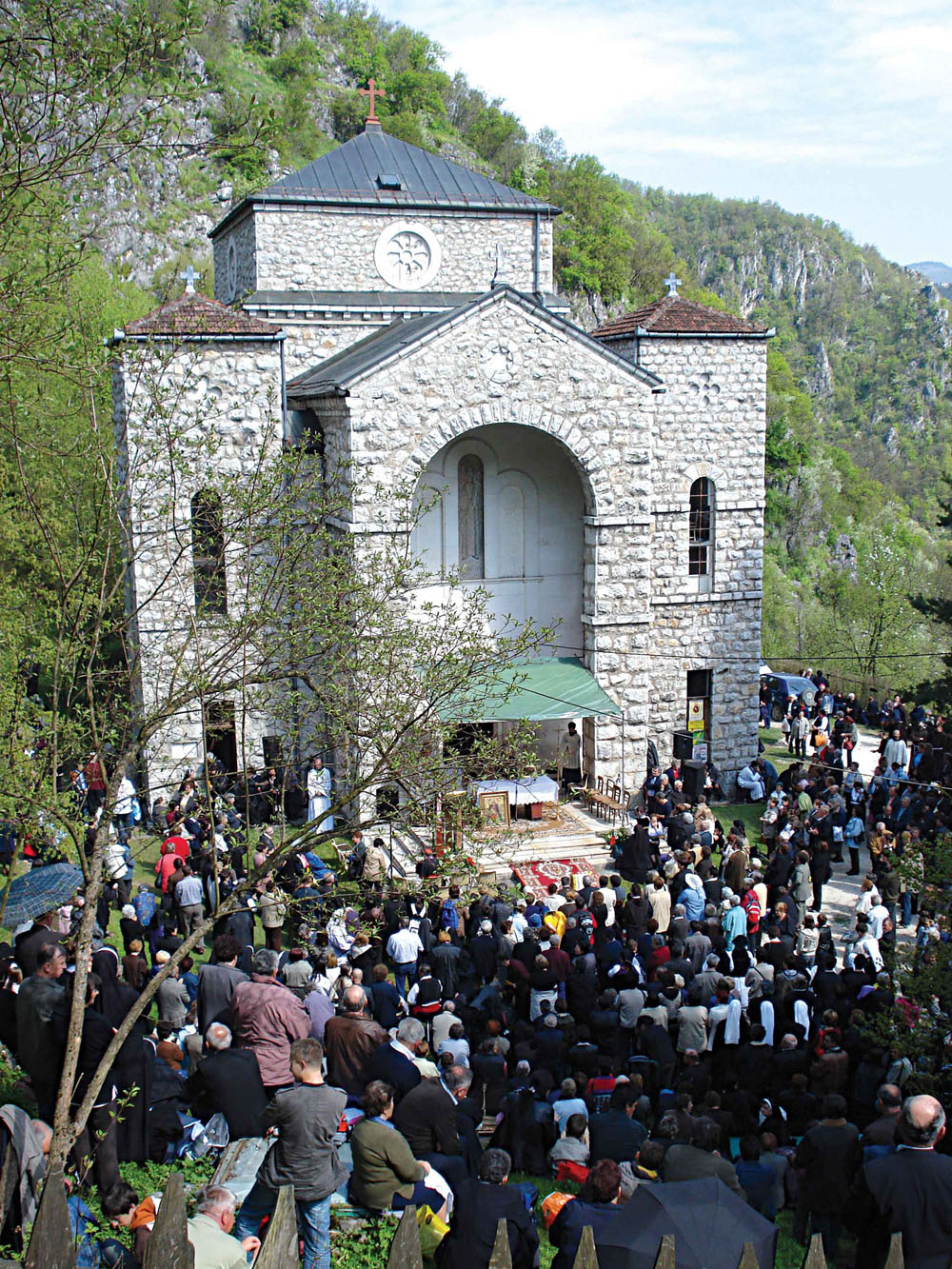
Our Lady of Olovo Shrine

- Our Lady of Međugorje (the Queen of Peace) Shrine, Međugorje
- Our Lady of Olovo Shrine, Olovo
- St John the Baptist Shrine, Podmilačje

=== Croatia ===
- Our Lady of Sinj, Sinj, Split-Dalmatia County
- Our Lady of Trsat Shrine, Trsat), Primorje-Gorski Kotar County
- Our Lady Queen of Croatia Basilica, Marija Bistrica, Krapina-Zagorje County
- Blessed Virgin Mary Church of Aljmaš, Erdut Municipality, Osijek-Baranja County

=== Czech Republic ===
- Loreta shrine, Prague
- Pilgrimage Basilica of the Visitation, Hejnice, Liberec District
- Chapel of St. Wenceslas in St. Vitus Cathedral, Prague

=== France ===
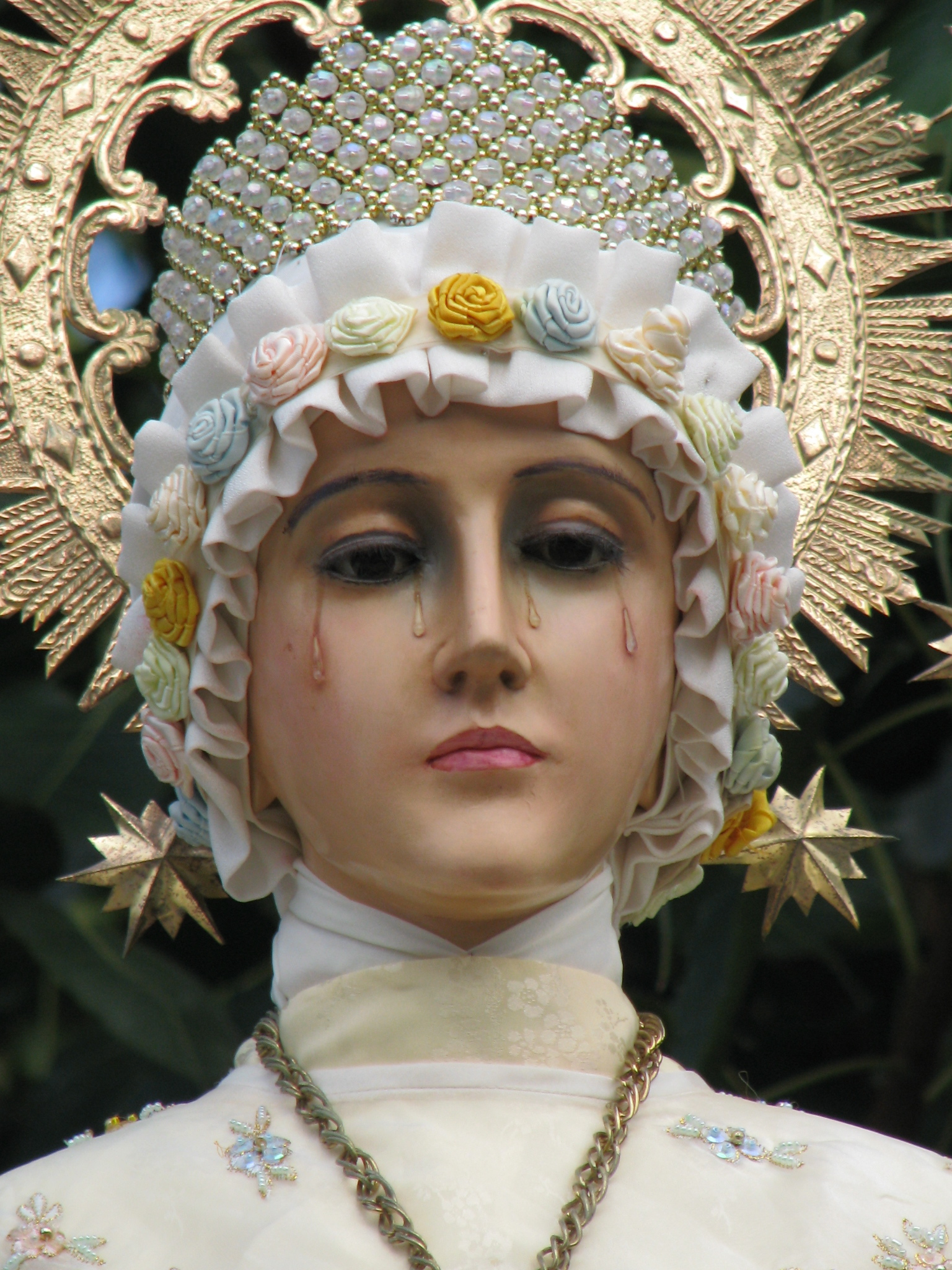
Our Lady of La Salette

- Basilica of Notre-Dame de Fourvière, Lyon, Rhône-Alpes
- Basilica of Our Lady of Hope, Pontmain, Mayenne
- Basilica of Our Lady of La Salette, La Salette-Fallavaux, Isère
- Basilica of Our Lady of Miracles, Mauriac, Cantal
- Basilica of Our Lady of Orcival, Orcival, Puy-de-Dôme
- Cathedral of Our Lady of Chartres, Chartres, Eure-et-Loir
- Cathedral of Our Lady of Le Puy, Le Puy-en-Velay, Haute-Loire
- Cathedral of Our Lady of Saint-Omer, Saint-Omer, Pas-de-Calais
- Cathedral of Our Lady of Strasbourg, Strasbourg, Alsace
- Cathedral of Our Lady of Verdun, Verdun, Meuse
- Chapel of Notre Dame du Haut, Ronchamp, Haute-Saône
- Chapel of Our Lady of the Assumption, Villé, Bas-Rhin
- Chapel of Our Lady of the Miraculous Medal, Paris
- Church of Our Lady of Saint-Cordon, Valenciennes, Nord
- Notre Dame de Paris, Paris
- Our Lady of Laus Shrine, Refuge of Sinner, Saint-Étienne-le-Laus, Hautes-Alpes
- Our Lady of the Snows Trappist Monastery, Saint-Laurent-les-Bains, Ardèche
- Pellevoisin Church (Mary, Mother of Mercy), Pellevoisin, Indre
- Sanctuary of Our Lady of Lourdes, Lourdes, Hautes-Pyrénées
- Sanctuary of the Blessed Virgin Mary of Rocamadour, Rocamadour, Lot

=== Germany ===
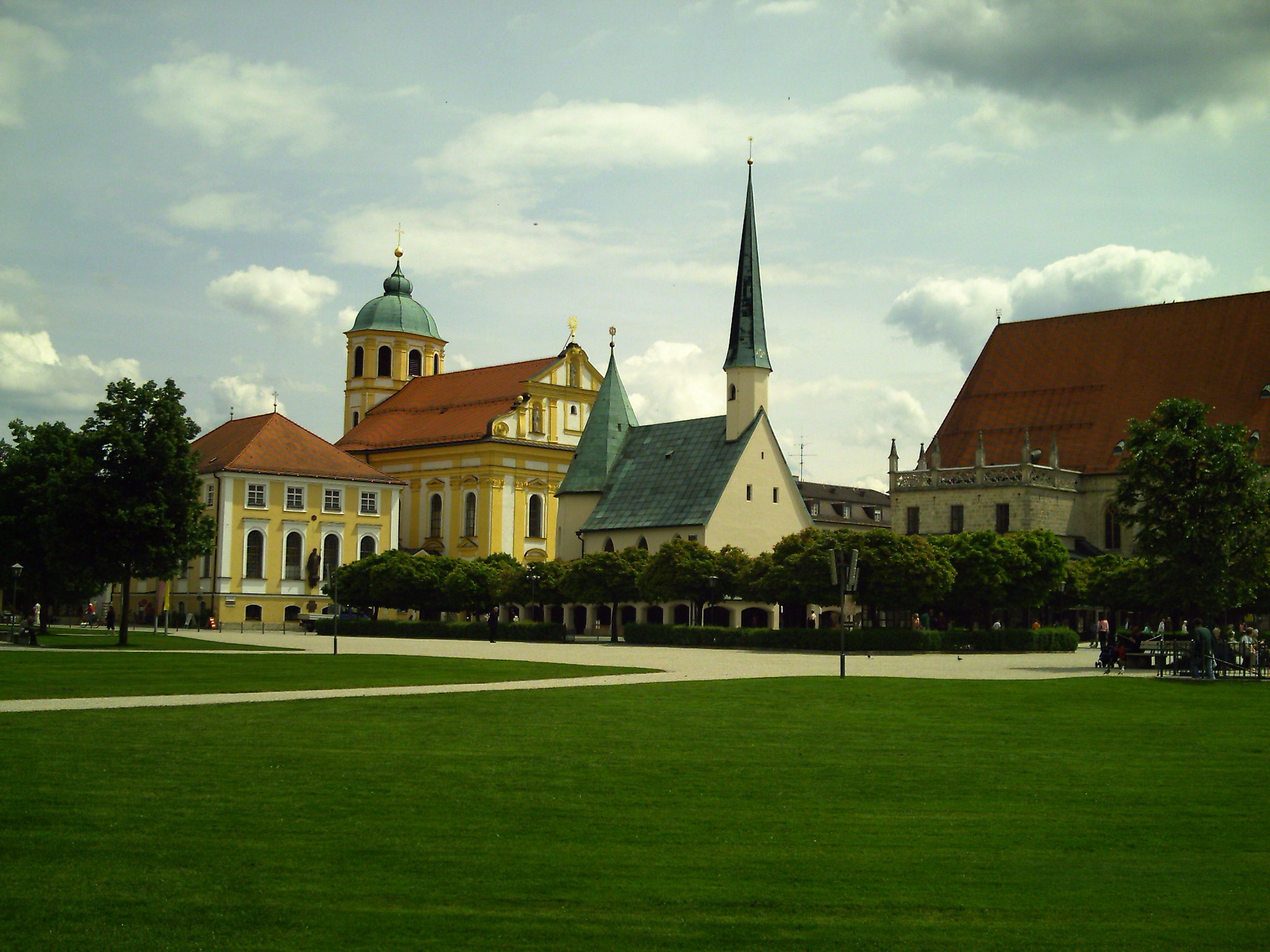
The Chapel of Grace

- Shrine of Our Lady of Altötting (Chapel of Grace), Altötting, Bavaria
- Shrine of the Three Kings in Cologne Cathedral, Cologne

=== Greece ===
- Mount Athos

=== Ireland ===
- Knock Shrine (the minor basilica of Our Lady of Knock, Queen of Ireland, Knock, County Mayo)

=== Italy ===
- Shrine of the Holy House of Loreto
- Shrine of the Virgin of the Rosary of Pompei
- Shrine of Saint Anthony of Padua
- Shrine of Saint Michael the Archangel
- Shrine of Padre Pio of Pietrelcina
- Shrine of the Mystical Rose in Fontanelle, Montichiari
- Shrine of the Virgin of Revelation in Tre Fontane, Rome
- Shrine of the Virgin of Tears in Syracuse, Sicily
- Shrine of Our Lady of Bonaria in Cagliari, Sardinia

=== Latvia ===
- Basilica of the Assumption of the Blessed Virgin Mary in Aglona

=== Malta ===
- the minor basilica of National Shrine of the Blessed Virgin of Ta’ Pinu [BVM Assumption] in Għarb

=== The Netherlands ===
- The Miracle of the Holy Sacrament in Amsterdam
- Our Lady in Peril in Heiloo
- Sweet Mother in 's-Hertogenbosch
- Our Lady, Star of the Sea in Maastricht
- Our Lady of the Enclosed Garden in Warfhuizen

=== Poland ===
- Divine Mercy Shrine in Płock
- Shrine to the Blessed Virgin Mary in Częstochowa
- Wawel Cathedral of St. Stanislaus and St. Wenceslaus in Kraków
- JHS Divine Mercy in Kraków-Łagiewniki
- Sanctuary of Our Lady of Licheń in Licheń Stary
- Supraśl Orthodox Monastery in Supraśl
- St. John's Cathedral in Warsaw

=== Portugal ===
Shrine of Our Lady of Fátima

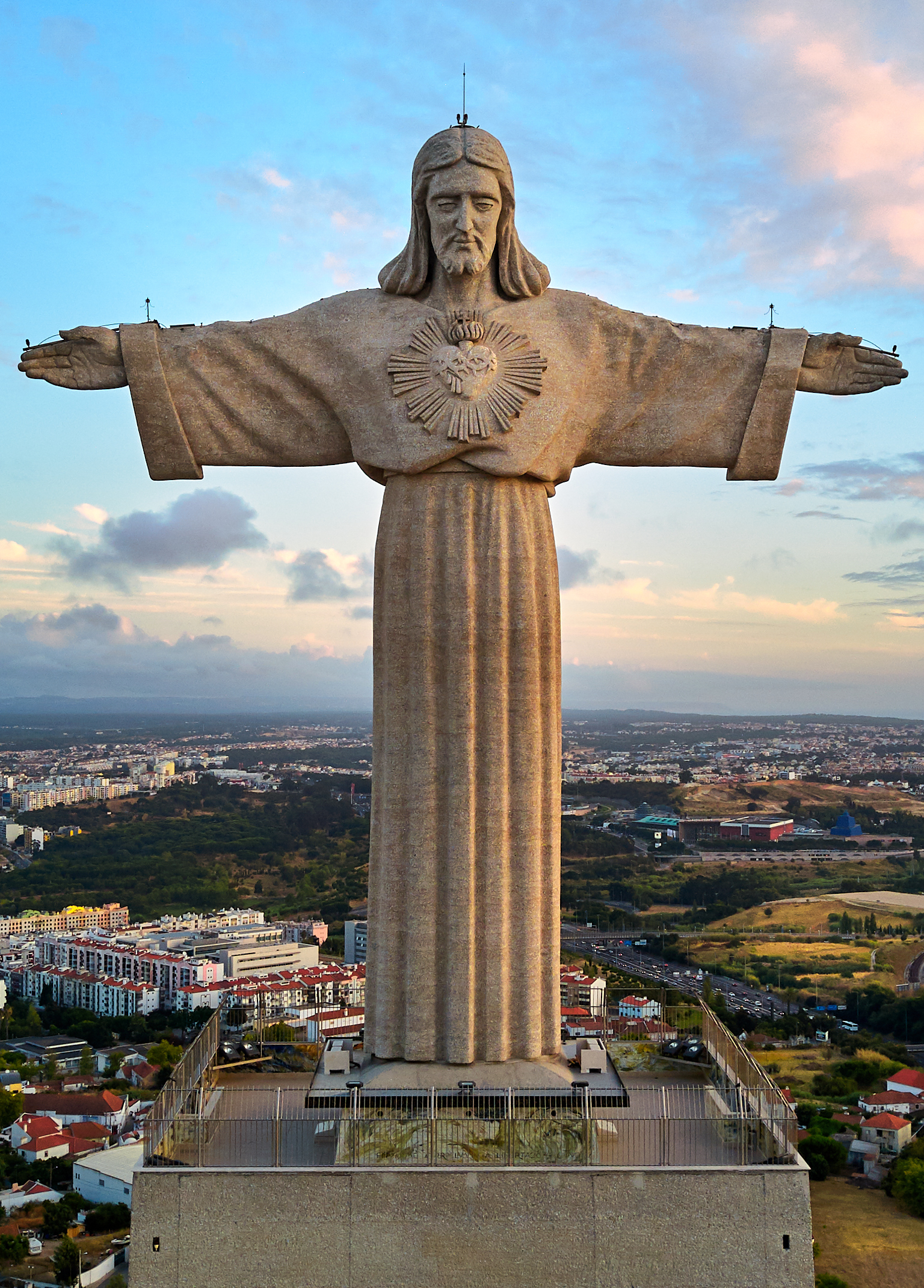
Shrine of Christ the King.

- Shrine of Our Lady of Fátima in Fátima
- Shrine of Christ the King in Almada
- Shrine of Blessed Alexandrina of Balazar in Balazar
- Shrine of Blessed Mary of the Divine Heart in Ermesinde
- Shrine of Our Lady of Sameiro in Braga
- Shrine of Estrela (or the Most Sacred Heart of Jesus) in Lisbon
- Shrine of the Sovereign Mother in Loulé

=== Spain ===
- Shrine of the Apostle Saint James the Great at Santiago de Compostela in Galicia, historically the third Catholic pilgrimage destination after Jerusalem and Rome
- Shrine of Our Lady of the Pillar in Zaragoza
- Shrine of Our Lady of Covadonga in Cangas de Onís
- Shrine of Our Lady of Mount Carmel in Garabandal
- Shrine of the Holy Christ of Agony in Limpias
- Shrine of Our Lady of Sorrows of Umbe in Laukiz
- Shrine of Our Lady of Sorrows of Chandavila in La Codosera
- Shrine of Our Lady of Onuva in La Puebla del Río
- Shrine of the Great Promise of the Sacred Heart in Valladolid
- Shrine of Our Lady of Montserrat in Terrassa
- Shrine of Our Lady of Candelaria in Tenerife

=== Slovakia ===
- Kalvária Banská Štiavnica

=== Ukraine ===
- Pochayiv Lavra

=== United Kingdom ===
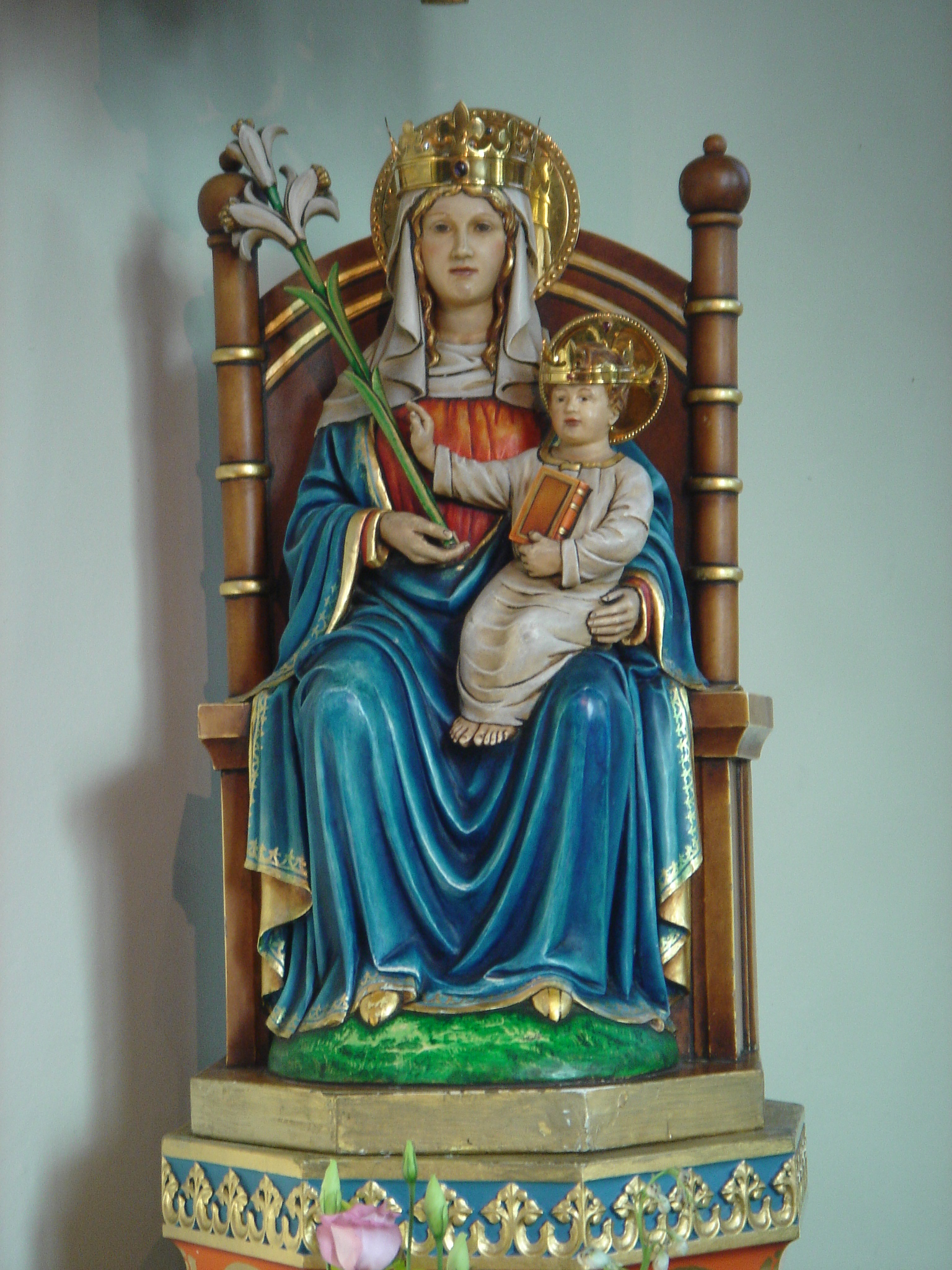
The image of Our Lady of Walsingham

- Shrine of Our Lady of Cardigan at Cardigan, Wales
- Shrine of Our Lady of Consolation at West Grinstead, England
- Shrine of Our Lady of Doncaster in Saint Peter-in-Chains Church, Doncaster, England
- Shrine of Our Lady of Glastonbury at Glastonbury, England
- Shrine of Our Lady of Ipswich at Saint Mary at the Elms Church, Ipswich, England
- Shrines of Our Lady of Walsingham at Walsingham, England
- Shrine of Our Lady of Westminster in Westminster Cathedral, City of Westminster, England
- Shrine of Our Lady of Willesden at Willesden, London, England
- Shrine of Saint Alban in St Albans Cathedral, St Albans, England
- Shrine of Saint Aldhelm in Malmesbury Abbey, Malmesbury, England
- Shrine of Saint Boniface in the Church of the Holy Cross and the Mother of Him who Hung Thereon, Crediton, England
- Shrine of Saint Chad in St Chad's Cathedral, Birmingham, England
- Shrine of Saint Cuthbert in Durham Cathedral, Durham, England
- Shrine of Saint Edburg in Stanton Harcourt, Oxfordshire
- Shrine of Saint Edmund in St Edmundsbury Cathedral, Bury St Edmunds, England
- Shrine of Saint Edward the Confessor in Westminster Abbey, City of Westminster, England
- Shrine of Saint Ethelbert in Hereford Cathedral, Hereford, England
- Shrine of Saint Etheldreda in Ely Cathedral, Ely, England
- Shrine of Saint Francis Cabrini in St George's Cathedral, Southwark, England
- Shrine of Saint Frideswide in Christ Church Cathedral, Oxford, England
- Shrine of Saint Gilbert of Sempringham in the Abbey Church of St Andrew, Sempringham, England
- Shrine of Saint Hilda in Whitby Abbey, Whitby, England
- Shrine of Saint Hugh of Lincoln in Lincoln Cathedral, Lincoln, England
- Shrine of Saint John of Beverley in Beverley Minster, Beverley, England
- Shrine of Saint Jude in the National Shrine of Saint Jude, Faversham, England
- Shrine of Julian of Norwich in Norwich Cathedral, Norwich
- Shrine of Saint Osmund in Trinity Chapel, Salisbury Cathedral, Salisbury
- Shrine of Saint Petroc in Bodmin Parish Church, Bodmin, England
- Shrine of Saint Swithun in Winchester Cathedral, Winchester, England
- Shrine of Saint Thomas de Cantilupe in Hereford Cathedral, Hereford, England
- Shrine of Saint Wilfrid in Ripon Cathedral, Ripon, England
- Shrine of Saint William of York in York Minster, York, England
- Shrine of Saint Winifred (now destroyed) in Shrewsbury Abbey, Shrewsbury, England
- Shrine of Saint Winifred at Holywell, Wales
- Shrine of Saint Wite at the Church of St Candida and Holy Cross, Whitchurch Canonicorum, England
- Shrine of Saint Wulfstan in Worcester Cathedral, Worcester, England
- Shrine of the Tyburn Martyrs in Tyburn Convent, London, England

== North America ==
=== Canada ===
- Basilica of Sainte-Anne-de-Beaupré, Quebec
- Blessed Vasyl Velychkovsky Shrine, Winnipeg
- Martyrs' Shrine in Midland, Ontario
- Sainte-Anne-du-Bocage in Caraquet, New-Brunswick
- Saint Joseph's Oratory, Montreal
- Notre-Dame-du-Cap Basilica, Trois-Rivières, Quebec
- National Shrine of Our Lady of Perpetual Help, St. Patrick's Church, Toronto, Ontario
- Our Lady of Sorrows Shrine, Cudworth, Saskatchewan

=== Mexico ===
- Basilica of Our Lady of Guadalupe in Mexico City

=== United States ===
- Basilica of the National Shrine of the Assumption of the Blessed Virgin Mary; in Baltimore, Maryland
- Blessed Francis Xavier Seelos, National Shrine of; in New Orleans, Louisiana
- Christ the King, Sovereign Priest, Shrine of; in Chicago, Illinois
- El Tiradito, Tucson, Arizona
- National Shrine of The Divine Mercy; in Stockbridge, Massachusetts
- Grotto of Our Lady of Lourdes, National Shrine; in Emmitsburg, Maryland
- The Grotto, The National Sanctuary of Our Sorrowful Mother; in Portland, Oregon
- Holy Hill National Shrine of Mary, Help of Christians in Hubertus, Wisconsin
- Basilica of the National Shrine of the Immaculate Conception; in Washington, D.C.
- Immaculate Conception, Catholic Shrine of the; in Atlanta, Georgia
- Infant Jesus, National Shrine of the; Prague, Oklahoma
- Little Flower, Shrine of the; in Nasonville, Rhode Island
- National Shrine of the Little Flower; in Royal Oak, Michigan
- Basilica of the National Shrine of the Little Flower; San Antonio, Texas
- Mary, Queen of the Universe Shrine; in Orlando, Florida
- Maximilian Kolbe, National Shrine of; Libertyville, Illinois
- Most Blessed Sacrament, Shrine of the; in Hanceville, Alabama
- National Shrine of the North American Martyrs; in Auriesville, New York
- Our Lady of Champion, National Shrine of in Champion, Wisconsin
- Basilica and National Shrine of Our Lady of Consolation; in Carey, Ohio
- Our Lady of Czestochowa:
  - National Shrine of Our Lady of Czestochowa; in Doylestown, Pennsylvania
  - Black Madonna Shrine and Grotto; near Pacific, Missouri
- Our Lady of Fátima, National Blue Army Shrine of; in Washington Township, New Jersey
- Our Lady of La Salette, National Shrine of; Attleboro, Massachusetts
- Our Lady of Good Help, Shrine of; in Brown County, Wisconsin
- Our Lady of Guadalupe:
  - Shrine of Our Lady of Guadalupe; in LaCrosse, Wisconsin
  - Virgin of Guadalupe, The Cathedral Shrine of the; in Dallas, Texas
  - National Shrine of Our Lady of Guadalupe (Sancturio Nacional de Nuestra Señora de Guadalupe); in Sacramento, California
- Our Lady of Mount Carmel, National Shrine of; in Middletown, New York
- Our Lady of Peace Shrine; in Santa Clara, California
- Basilica of Our Lady of San Juan del Valle – National Shrine; in San Juan, Texas
- Our Lady of the Miraculous Medal, National Shrine of; in Perryville, Missouri
- Our Lady of the Miraculous Medal, Basilica Shrine of; in Philadelphia, Pennsylvania
- National Shrine of Our Lady of the Snows; in Belleville, Illinois
- Our Lady of Victory Basilica and National Shrine; in Lackawanna, New York
- National Shrine to Our Lady of Walsingham in Sheboygan, Wisconsin
- Basilica of the National Shrine of St. Ann; in Scranton, Pennsylvania
- The Shrine of St. Bernadette; in Albuquerque, New Mexico
- St. Elizabeth Ann Seton:
  - National Shrine of St. Elizabeth Ann Seton; in Emmitsburg, Maryland
  - Shrine of St. Elizabeth Ann Bayley Seton; in Manhattan, New York
- St. Frances Xavier Cabrini (Mother Cabrini):
  - National Shrine of Saint Frances Xavier Cabrini; in Lincoln Park, Chicago, Illinois
  - St. Frances Xavier Cabrini Shrine; in Washington Heights, Manhattan, New York
  - Mother Cabrini Shrine; in Golden, Colorado
- Saint Francis of Assisi, National Shrine of; in San Francisco, California
- National Shrine of Saint John Neumann; in Philadelphia, Pennsylvania
- Saint Joseph, Shrine of; in St. Louis, Missouri.
- National Shrine of St. Jude; in Chicago, Illinois
- St. Kateri Tekawitha, National Shrine of; in Fonda, New York
- Saint Katharine Drexel Mission Center and Shrine; in Bensalem Township, Pennsylvania
- Cathedral of Saint Paul, National Shrine of the Apostle Paul; in St. Paul, Minnesota
- St. Padre Pio Shrine; in Buena, New Jersey
- Saint Rita of Cascia, National Shrine of; Philadelphia, Pennsylvania
- St. Rose Philippine Duchesne Shrine; in St. Charles, Missouri
- Blessed Stanley Rother Shrine; in Oklahoma City, Oklahoma
- St. Thérèse, National Shrine of; in Darien, Illinois
- Mission San Xavier del Bac; outside Tucson, Arizona

== South America ==
=== Brazil ===
- Basilica of the National Shrine of Our Lady of Aparecida, Aparecida

=== Ecuador ===
- National Shrine of Our Lady of El Cisne (Nuestra Señora de el Cisne), in El Cisne, Loja.

=== Venezuela ===
- Shrine of Our Lady of Betania, in the State of Miranda
- Shrine of the Virgen de Coromoto (Patroness of Venezuela), Barinas

== Oceania ==
=== Australia ===
- St. Mary's Cathedral, Sydney, a minor basilica
- St. Anthony's National Shrine, Hawthorn, Victoria
- National Shrine of Our Lady of Mount Carmel, Melbourne
- National Shrine of Saint Thérèse of Lisieux, Kew, Victoria

== See also ==
- List of Christian shrines
- Shrines to the Virgin Mary
- Category:Islamic shrines
- Category:Shinto shrines
