= List of Christian shrines =

This is a list of the more notable Christian shrines around the world.

== Africa ==
=== Algeria ===
- Notre Dame d'Afrique, Algiers

=== Cameroon ===
- Basilique Marie-Reine-des-Apôtres (Mary Queen of the Apostles Basilica) in Yaoundé.

=== Egypt ===
- Our Lady of Warraq, Giza
- Virgin Mary & St. Abanoub Coptic Orthodox Church (Samanoud), Shrine of Saint Abanoub
- Monastery of Saint Macarius the Great, Shrine of Saint John the Baptist & Elisha the Prophet
- Monastery of Saint Macarius the Great, Shrine of Saints Macarius the Great, Macarius of Alexandria, Macarius of the Bishop & Saint John the Short
- Monastery of Saint Mary Deipara, Shrine of Mary Magdalene & Shrine of Father Faltaous El-Souriani
- Coptic Monastery of Saint Fana, Shrine of Saint Fana
- Saint Mark's Coptic Orthodox Cathedral (Alexandria), Shrine of Saint Mark the Evangelist
- Saint Mark's Coptic Orthodox Cathedral, Cairo, Shrine of Saint Athanasius
- Saint Mark's Coptic Orthodox Cathedral, Cairo, Shrine of Father Mikhail Ibrahim
- Saint Anthony the Great Coptic Orthodox Monastery, Eastern Desert, Shrine of Anba Anthony the Great
- Paromeos Monastery, Shrine of Saints Maximus & Domitius
- Monastery of Saint Thomas (Akhmim), Shrine of Saint Thomas the Hermit
- White Monastery, Shrine of Saint Shenouda the Archimandrite
- Convent of Saint Damiana, Shrine of Saint Damiana
- Convent of Saint Theodore (Harat al-Rum), Shrine of Saint Marina the Monk
- St. Abraam Coptic Orthodox Monastery, Shrine of Abraam, Bishop of Faiyum
- Monastery of Saint Mina, Shrine of Pope Cyril VI & Saint Menas
- St. George Coptic Orthodox Church (Sporting, Alexandria), Shrine of Abouna Bishoy Kamel
- Saint Mercurius Church in Coptic Cairo, Shrine of Mother Irini
- Monastery of Saint Pishoy, Shrine of Pope Shenouda III & Shrine of Saint Pishoy & Bishop Sarabamon & Saint Paul of Tammah

=== Kenya ===
- National Marian Shrine, Subukia, Nakuru County

=== Rwanda ===
- Shrine of Our Lady of Sorrows, Kibeho

=== South Africa ===
- Ngome Marian Shrine in Ngome, KwaZulu-Natal

=== Uganda ===
- Uganda Martyrs Shrine, Namugongo

== Asia ==
=== Cyprus ===
- The Holy Monastery of the Virgin of Kykkos, near Pedoulas, Nicosia District

=== India ===
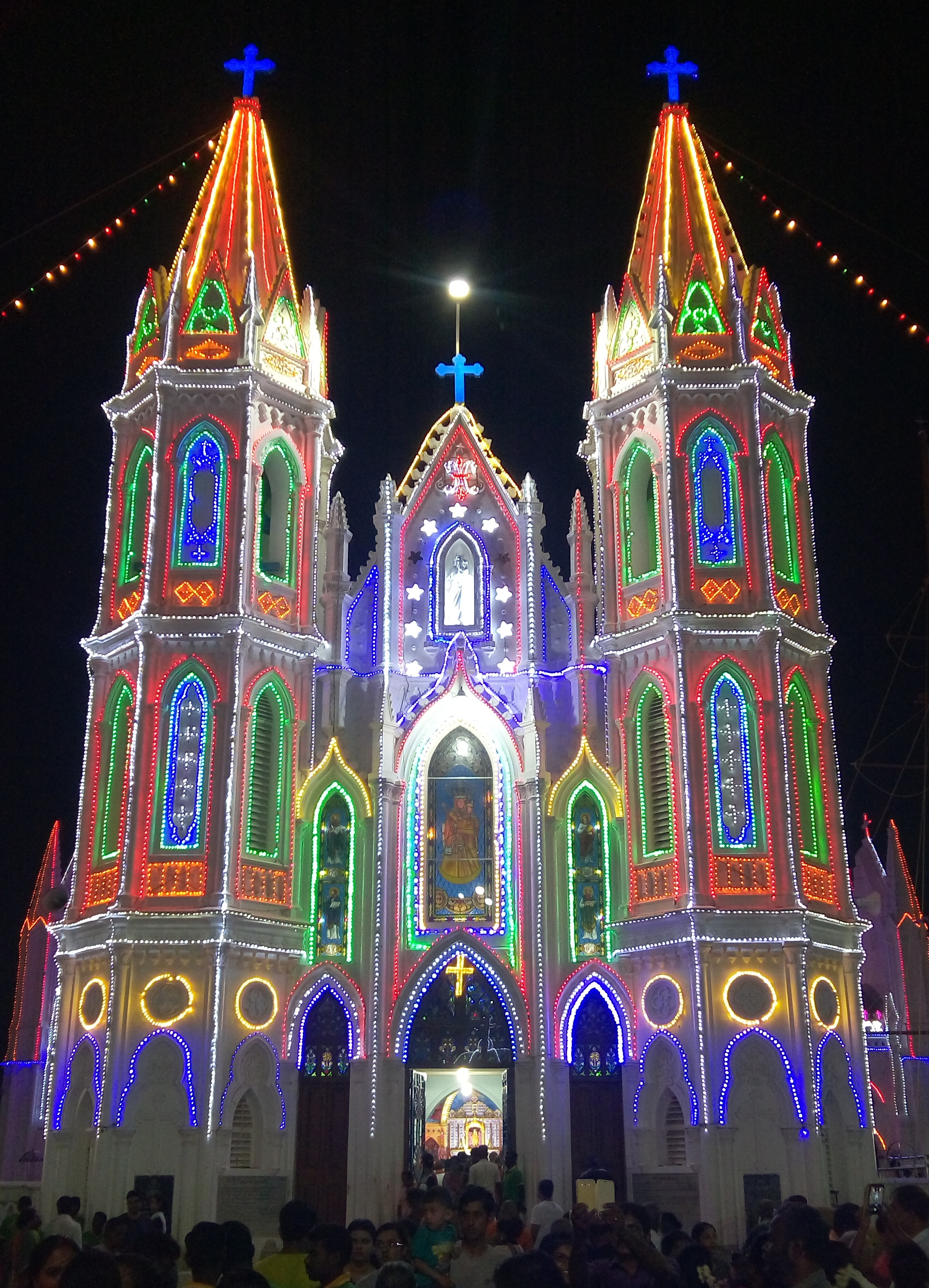
Basilica of Our Lady of Good Health, Vailankanni

- National Chrine of Saint Thomas, Chennai, Tamil Nadu.
- Basilica of Bom Jesus, Goa Velha, Goa
- Sanctuary of Our Lady of Velankanni
- Basilica of Our Lady of the Mount, Bandra, Mumbai
- Saint Mary’s Basilica, Bengaluru, Karnataka
- Shrine of St. Jude Church, Jhansi
- Basilica of Our Lady of Snow (Manjumatha), Pallipport, Pallippuram, Ernakulam, Kerala
- Basilica of Our Lady of Snow, Tuticorin, Tamil Nadu
- Church of Our Lady of Snow, Kallikulam, Tamil Nadu
- Church of Our Lady of Red Sand, Sokkankudiyiruppu, Tamil Nadu
- Korattymuthy Shrine of Our Lady with Poovan Bananas, Koratty, Kerala
- St. Sebastian's International Shrine, Alleppey, Kerala
- Saint Thomas Church Thumpoly, Alappuzha, Kerala.
- St. Lawrence Shrine, Karkala, Karnataka
- Malayattoor in Kerala, of the Syro-Malabar Catholic Church - One of the seven international shrines designated by the Vatican.
- National Shrine Basilica of Our Lady of Ransom, Vallarpadom, Ernakulam
- Our Lady of Lourdes Shrine, Villianur, Puducherry
- Our Lady of Assumption Church, Poomkavu, Alappuzha, Kerala.
- Basilica of Our Lady of Lourdes, Poondi, Tamil Nadu
- Shrine of St. Antony of Padua, Kaloor, Ernakulam
- St. George's Forane Church, Edappally, Edappally, Ernakulam

=== Israel ===
- Basilica of the Annunciation, in Nazareth.

=== Japan ===
- Our Lady of Akita, Akita.

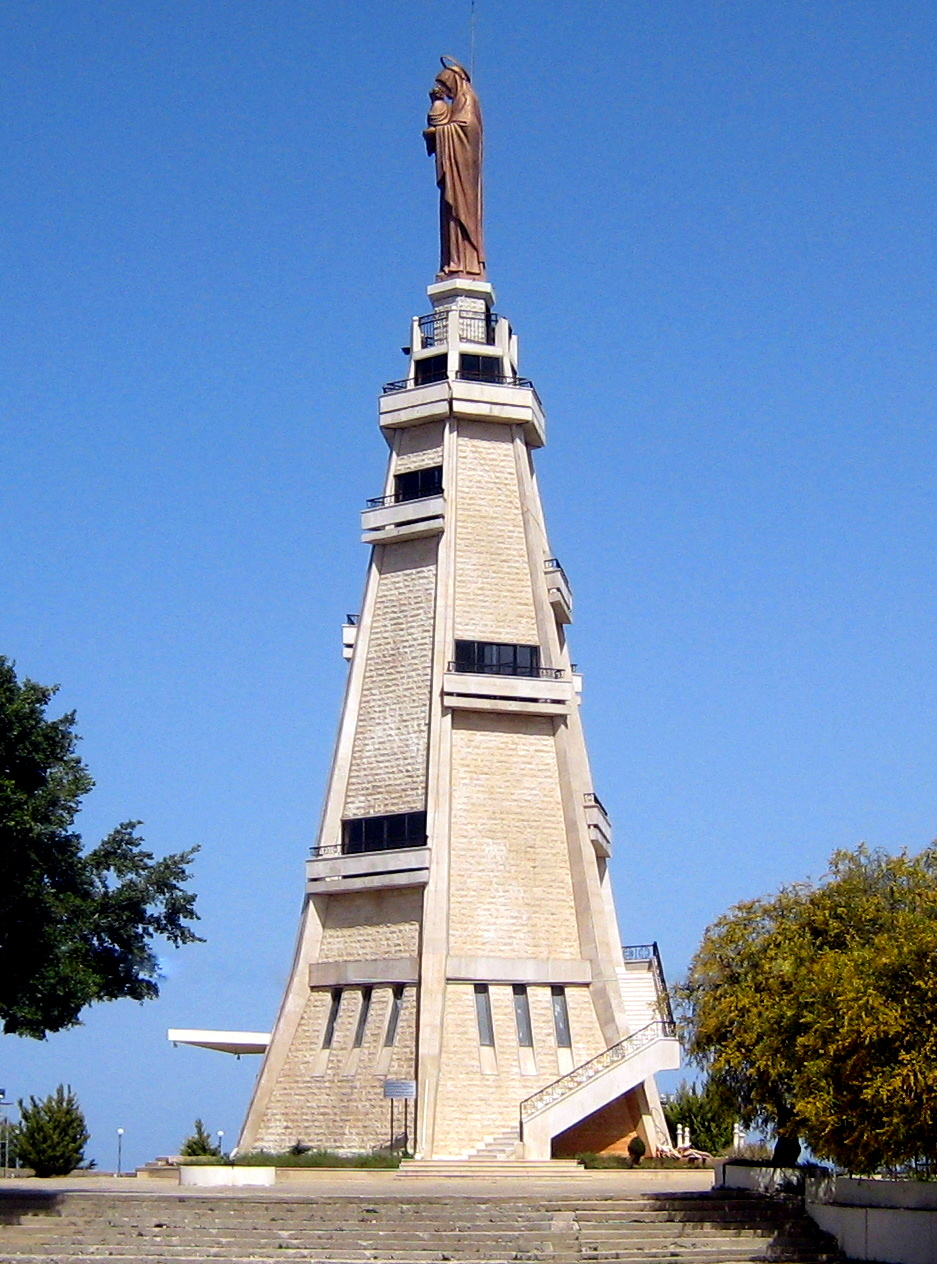
Notre-Dame de Mantara

=== Lebanon ===
- Saint Charbel Shrine, Ain Ebel
- Sanctuary of Our Lady of Bechouat, Beqaa Valley
- Shrine of Our Lady of Lebanon, Harissa
- Our Lady of Mantara Shrine, Maghdouché
- Our Lady of Miziara, Mother of Mercies, Miziara, Zgharta District
- Our Lady of Nourieh Shrine and Monastery, Hamat
- Our Lady of the Waterfall Shrine, Jezzine
- Our Lady of Zahle and the Bekaa Chapel, Zahlé

=== Pakistan ===
- National Marian Shrine, Mariamabad

=== Palestine ===
- Church of All Nations, Jerusalem
- Church of the Nativity, Bethlehem
- Church of the Sepulchre of Saint Mary, Jerusalem

=== Philippines ===
- Diocesan Shrine of Nuestra Señora del Buen Suceso, Parañaque, Metro Manila
- Mary, Queen of Peace Shrine, Quezon City, Metro Manila
- National Shrine of Our Lady of Fatima, Valenzuela City, Metro Manila
- National Shrine of Our Mother of Perpetual Help, Baclaran, Parañaque, Metro Manila
- National Shrine of Saint Anne, Hagonoy, Bulacan
- Nuestra Senora dela Asuncion Church in Santa Maria, Ilocos Sur
- Our Lady of Caysasay Shrine, Taal, Batangas
- Our Lady of Immaculate Conception Basilica, Malolos, Bulacan
- Our Lady of Peñafrancia Basilica, Naga City, Camarines Sur
- Our Lady of Piat Shrine, Piat, Cagayan
- Our Lady of the Pillar Shrine, Fort Pilar, Zamboanga City
- Our Lady of the Rosary of Manaoag, Manaoag, Pangasinan
- National Shrine of Our Lady of the Holy Rosary, Quezon City
- Archdiocesan Shrine of Christ our Lord of the Holy Sepulcher, Angeles, Pampanga
- National Shrine of Our Lady of the Visitation of Guibang, Gamu, Isabela
- National Shrine of Our Lady of Peace and Good Voyage, Antipolo
- Diocesan Shrine and Parish of Our Lady of the Abandoned, Marikina
- Minor Basilica of the Black Nazarene, Quiapo, Manila
- National Shrine of Saint Padre Pio of Pietrelcina, San Pedro, Santo Tomas, Batangas
- Mary Help of Christians National Shrine, Better Living, Parañaque City
- Diocesan Shrine of Our Lady of Aranzazu, San Mateo, Rizal

=== Sri Lanka ===
- Basilica of Our Lady of Lanka, in Tewatte, Ragama
- Shrine of Our Lady of Madhu in Mannar district
- Shrine of Our Lady of Matara in Matara

=== Syria ===
- Our Lady of Saidnaya Monastery, Saidnaya

=== Turkey ===
- Church of St. Mary of the Spring, Istanbul
- House of the Virgin Mary, Mt. Bülbüldağı near Selçuk

=== Vietnam ===
- Our Lady of La Vang in Quảng Trị

== Europe ==
=== Andorra ===
- Our Lady of Meritxell, Meritxell, Canillo

=== Austria ===
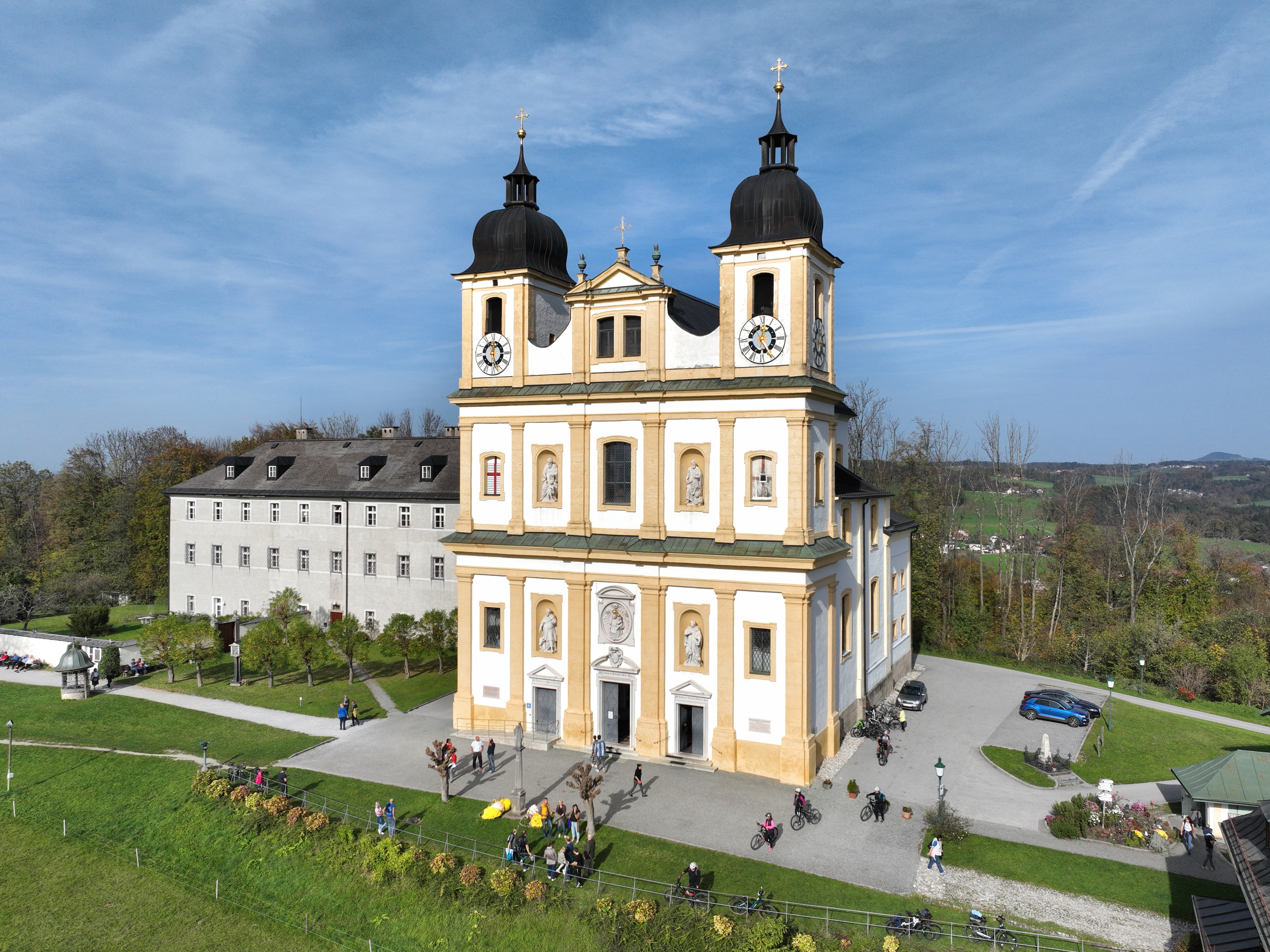
Maria Plain Basilica

- Maria Absam Basilica (St. Michael the Archangel Basilica), Absam, Innsbruck-Land District, Tyrol
- Maria Plain Basilica of Our Lady of the Assumption, Bergheim, Salzburg
- Maria Schmolln Sanctuary, Maria Schmolln, Braunau am Inn District, Upper Austria
- Maria Taferl Basilica, Maria Taferl, Melk District, Lower Austria
- Mariatrost Basilica, Mariatrost, District of Graz, Styria
- Mariazell Basilica of the Birth of the Virgin Mary, Mariazell, Styria

=== Belgium ===
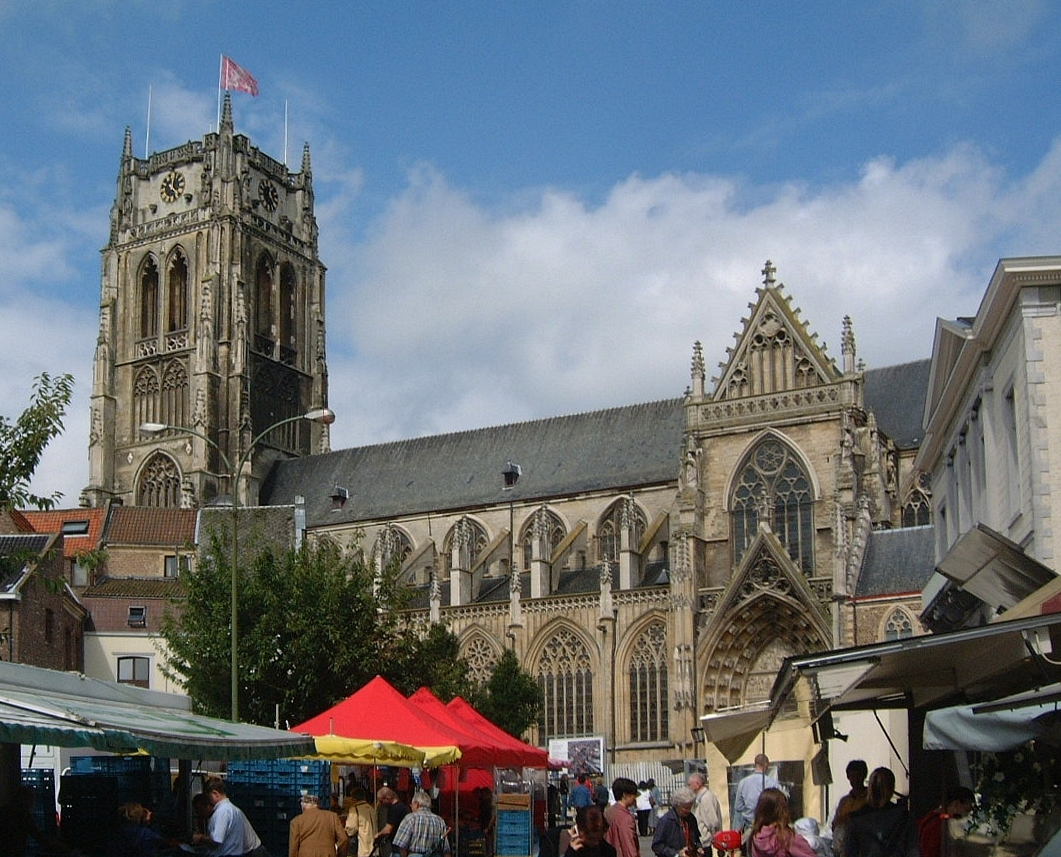
Our Lady of Tongeren Basilica

- Our Lady of Banneux Chapel, Banneux, Liège
- Our Lady of Beauraing Shrine, Beauraing, Namur
- Our Lady of Halle Basilica (Basilica of Saint Martin), Halle, Flemish Brabant
- Our Lady of Scherpenheuvel Basilica, Scherpenheuvel-Zichem, Flemish Brabant
- St. Mary of Oostakker Shrine, Oostakker, Ghent
- Our Lady of Tongeren Basilica, Tongeren, Limburg

=== Bosnia and Herzegovina ===
- Our Lady of Međugorje (the Queen of Peace) Shrine, Međugorje
- Our Lady of Olovo Shrine, Olovo
- St John the Baptist Shrine, Podmilačje

=== Croatia ===
- Our Lady of Sinj, Sinj, Split-Dalmatia County
- Our Lady of Trsat Shrine, Trsat), Primorje-Gorski Kotar County
- Our Lady Queen of Croatia Basilica, Marija Bistrica, Krapina-Zagorje County
- Blessed Virgin Mary Church of Aljmaš, Erdut Municipality, Osijek-Baranja County

=== Czech Republic ===
- Loreta shrine, Prague
- Pilgrimage Basilica of the Visitation, Hejnice, Liberec District
- Chapel of St. Wenceslas in St. Vitus Cathedral, Prague

=== France ===
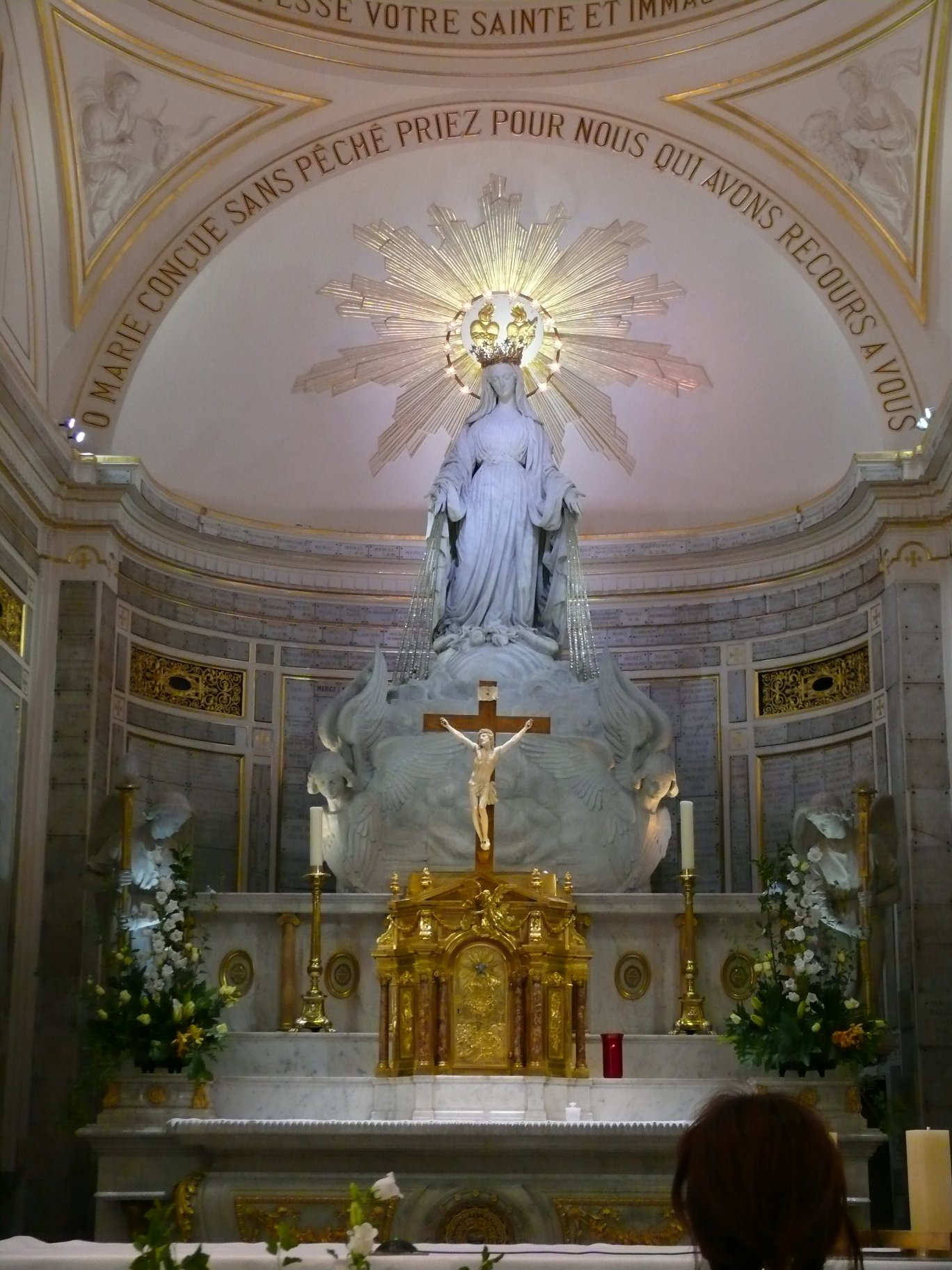
Chapelle Notre-Dame de la Médaille Miraculeuse, Paris

- Basilica of Notre-Dame de Fourvière, Lyon, Rhône-Alpes
- Basilica of Our Lady of Hope, Pontmain, Mayenne
- Basilica of Our Lady of La Salette, La Salette-Fallavaux, Isère
- Basilica of Our Lady of Orcival, Orcival, Puy-de-Dôme
- Cathedral of Our Lady of Chartres, Chartres, Eure-et-Loir
- Cathedral of Our Lady of Le Puy, Le Puy-en-Velay, Haute-Loire
- Cathedral of Our Lady of Saint-Omer, Saint-Omer, Pas-de-Calais
- Cathedral of Our Lady of Strasbourg, Strasbourg, Alsace
- Cathedral of Our Lady of Verdun, Verdun, Meuse
- Chapel of Notre Dame du Haut, Ronchamp, Haute-Saône
- Chapel of Our Lady of the Assumption, Villé, Bas-Rhin
- Chapel of Our Lady of the Miraculous Medal, Paris
- Church of Our Lady of Saint-Cordon, Valenciennes, Nord
- Notre Dame de Paris, Paris
- Our Lady of Laus Shrine, Refuge of Sinner, Saint-Étienne-le-Laus, Hautes-Alpes
- Our Lady of the Snows Trappist Monastery, Saint-Laurent-les-Bains, Ardèche
- Pellevoisin Church (Mary, Mother of Mercy), Pellevoisin, Indre
- Sanctuary of Our Lady of Lourdes, Lourdes, Hautes-Pyrénées
- Sanctuary of the Blessed Virgin Mary of Rocamadour, Rocamadour, Lot

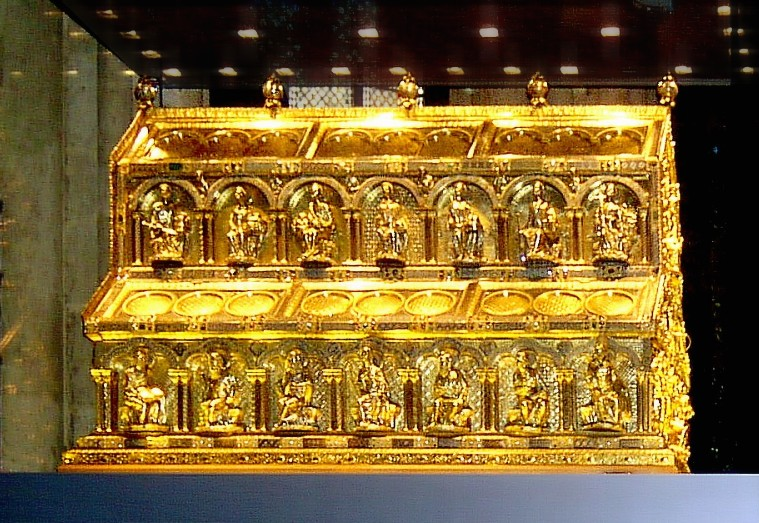
Shrine of Magi, Cologne Cathedral

=== Germany ===
- Shrine of Our Lady of Altötting (Chapel of Grace), Altötting, Bavaria
- Shrine of the Three Kings in Cologne Cathedral, Cologne

=== Greece ===
- The Autonomous Monastic community of Mount Athos
  - Great Lavra Monastery
  - Vatopedi Monastery
  - Iviron Monastery
  - Hilandar Monastery
  - Dionysiou Monastery
  - Koutloumousiou Monastery
  - Pantokratoros Monastery
  - Xeropotamou Monastery
  - Zografou Monastery
  - Docheiariou Monastery
  - Karakalou Monastery
  - Filotheou Monastery
  - Simonopetra Monastery
  - Agiou Pavlou Monastery
  - Stavronikita Monastery
  - Xenophontos Monastery
  - Osiou Grigoriou Monastery
  - Esphigmenou Monastery
  - Agiou Panteleimonos Monastery
  - Konstamonitou Monastery
- The Monastic Communities in Meteora
  - Monastery of Great Meteoron
  - Monastery of Varlaam
  - Monastery of Rousanou
  - Monastery of the Holy Trinity, Meteora
  - Monastery of Saint Stephen (Meteora)
- Our Lady of Tinos
- Monastery of Saint John the Theologian, Patmos
- Hagios Demetrios Cathedral, Thessaloniki
- Panagia Ekatontapiliani, Paros
- Holy Pilgrimage Church of Taxiarches Mantamados, Lesvos
- Nea Moni of Chios
- Mystras Monastic Communities
  - Pantanassa Monastery
- Daphni Monastery, Haidari, Athens
- Hosios Loukas, Boeotia
- Saint Spyridon Church, Corfu
- Hagia Sophia, Thessaloniki
- Vlatades Monastery, Thessaloniki
- Church of St. Catherine, Thessaloniki
- Church of the Holy Apostles, Thessaloniki
- Church of St. Nicholas Orphanos, Thessaloniki
- Church of Hosios David, Thessaloniki
- Church of St. Panteleimon, Thessaloniki
- Church of Panagia Chalkeon, Thessaloniki
- Church of the Saviour, Thessaloniki
- Church of Prophet Elijah, Thessaloniki
- Church of the Acheiropoietos, Thessaloniki
- Church of Panagia Kapnikarea, Athens
- Church of the Pantanassa, Athens
- Church of the Holy Apostles, Athens
- Little Metropolis, Athens
- Metropolitan Cathedral of Athens
- Cathedral of Saint Andrew, Patras
- Church of St. Panteleimon of Acharnai, Athens
- Agios Minas Cathedral, Heraklion
- Monastery of Saint David the Elder, Euboea
- Monastery of Saint John the Theologian (Souroti)
- Saint Efraim Monastery, Nea Makri
- Transfiguration of the Savior Monastery, Attica
- Holy Shrine of Saint John the Russian, Euboea
- Holy Monastery of the Holy Trinity - Saint Nectarios of Aegina

=== Ireland ===
- Knock Shrine (the minor basilica of Our Lady of Knock, Queen of Ireland) in Knock, County Mayo

=== Italy ===
- Shrine of the Blessed Virgin Mary cathedral at Loreto
- Pontifical Basilica of St. Anthony of Padua

=== Latvia ===
- Basilica of the Assumption in Aglona

=== Malta ===
- Minor basilica of National Shrine of the Blessed Virgin of Ta’ Pinu [BVM Assumption] in Għarb

=== The Netherlands ===
- The Miracle of the Holy Sacrament in Amsterdam
- Our Lady of Help in Heiloo
- Sweet Mother in 's-Hertogenbosch
- Our Lady, Star of the Sea in Maastricht
- Our Lady of the Enclosed Garden in Warfhuizen

=== Poland ===
- Divine Mercy Shrine in Płock
- Shrine to the Blessed Virgin Mary in Częstochowa
- Wawel Cathedral of St. Stanislaus and St. Wenceslaus in Kraków
- JHS Divine Mercy in Kraków-Łagiewniki
- Sanctuary of Our Lady of Licheń in Licheń Stary
- Supraśl Orthodox Monastery in Supraśl
- St. John's Cathedral in Warsaw

=== Portugal ===
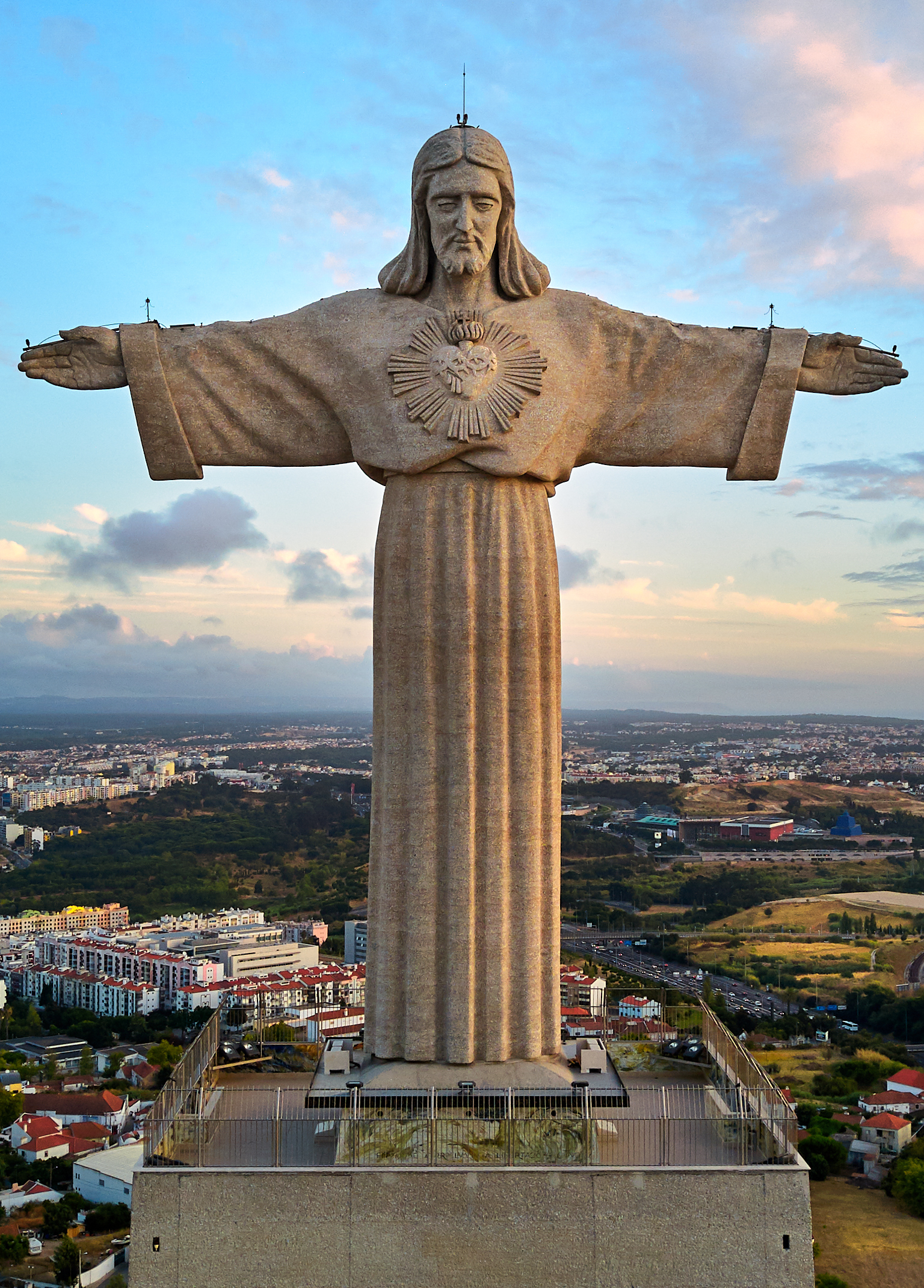
Shrine of Christ the King.

- Shrine of Our Lady of Fátima in Fátima
- Shrine of Christ the King in Almada
- Shrine of Blessed Alexandrina of Balazar in Balazar
- Shrine of Blessed Mary of the Divine Heart in Ermesinde
- Shrine of Our Lady of Sameiro in Braga
- Shrine of Estrela (or the Most Sacred Heart of Jesus) in Lisbon
- Shrine of the Sovereign Mother in Loulé

=== Spain ===
- Shrine of the Apostle Saint James the Great at Santiago de Compostela in Galicia, historically the third Catholic pilgrimage destination after Jerusalem and Rome
- Shrine of Our Lady of the Pillar in Zaragoza
- Shrine of Our Lady of Covadonga in Cangas de Onís
- Shrine of Our Lady of Mount Carmel in Garabandal
- Shrine of the Holy Christ of Agony in Limpias
- Shrine of Our Lady of Sorrows of Umbe in Laukiz
- Shrine of Our Lady of Sorrows of Chandavila in La Codosera
- Shrine of Our Lady of Onuva in La Puebla del Río
- Shrine of the Great Promise of the Sacred Heart in Valladolid
- Shrine of Our Lady of Montserrat in Terrassa
- Shrine of Our Lady of Candelaria in Tenerife

=== Slovakia ===
- Kalvária Banská Štiavnica

=== Ukraine ===
- Pochayiv Lavra

=== United Kingdom ===
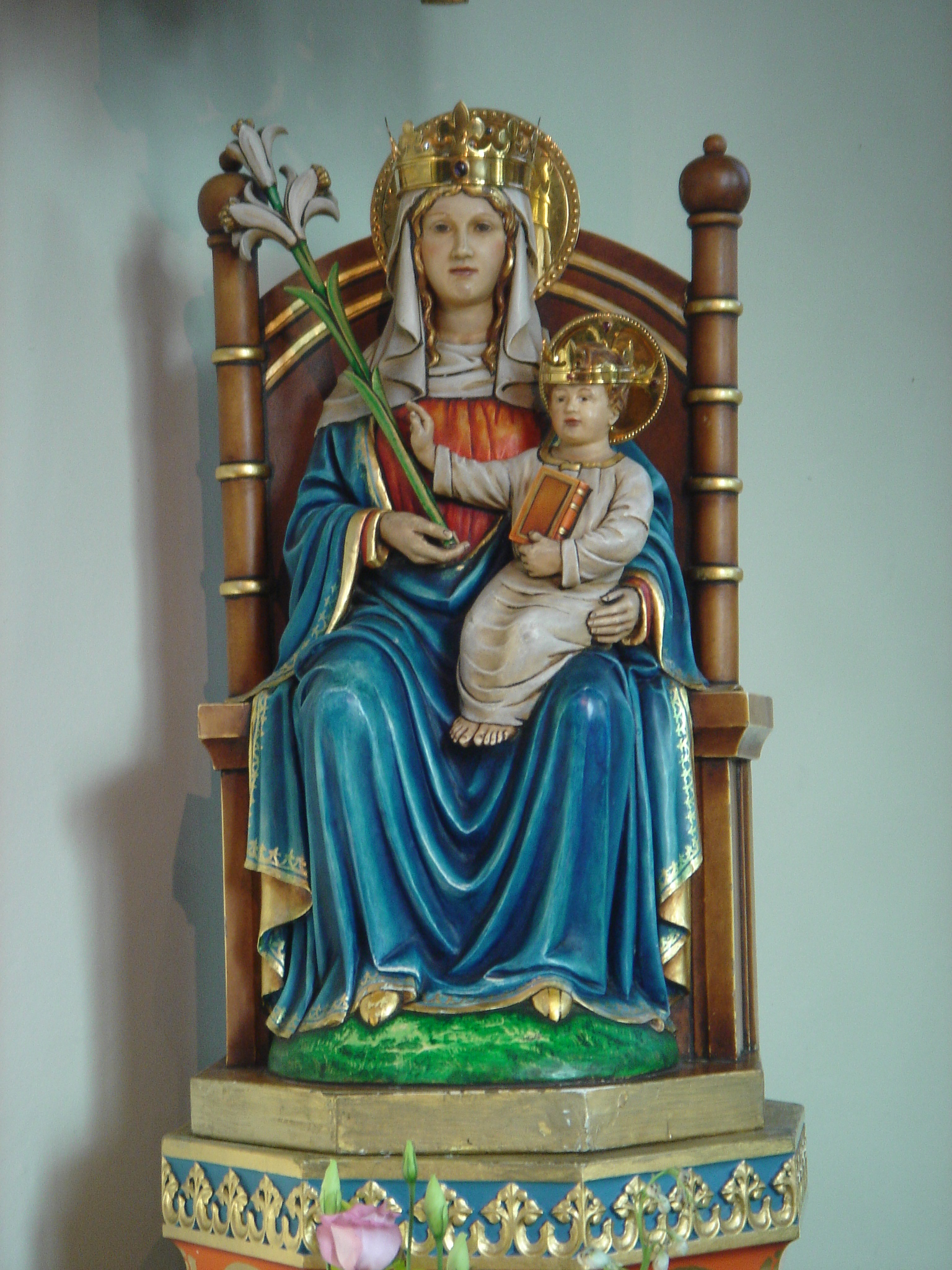
The image of Our Lady of Walsingham

- Shrine of Our Lady of Cardigan at Cardigan, Wales
- Shrine of Our Lady of Consolation at West Grinstead, England
- Shrine of Our Lady of Doncaster in Saint Peter-in-Chains Church, Doncaster, England
- Shrine of Our Lady of Glastonbury at Glastonbury, England
- Shrine of Our Lady of Ipswich at Saint Mary at the Elms Church, Ipswich, England
- Shrines of Our Lady of Walsingham at Walsingham, England
- Shrine of Our Lady of Westminster in Westminster Cathedral, City of Westminster, England
- Shrine of Our Lady of Willesden at Willesden, London, England
- Shrine of Saint Alban in St Albans Cathedral, St Albans, England
- Shrine of Saint Aldhelm in Malmesbury Abbey, Malmesbury, England
- Shrine of Saint Boniface in the Church of the Holy Cross and the Mother of Him who Hung Thereon, Crediton, England
- Shrine of Saint Chad in St Chad's Cathedral, Birmingham, England
- Shrine of Saint Cuthbert in Durham Cathedral, Durham, England
- Shrine of Saint Edmund in St Edmundsbury Cathedral, Bury St Edmunds, England
- Shrine of Saint Edward the Confessor in Westminster Abbey, City of Westminster, England
- Shrine of Saint Ethelbert in Hereford Cathedral, Hereford, England
- Shrine of Saint Etheldreda in Ely Cathedral, Ely, England
- Shrine of Saint Francis Cabrini in St George's Cathedral, Southwark, England
- Shrine of Saint Frideswide in Christ Church Cathedral, Oxford, England
- Shrine of Saint Gilbert of Sempringham in the Abbey Church of St Andrew, Sempringham, England
- Shrine of Saint Hilda in Whitby Abbey, Whitby, England
- Shrine of Saint Hugh of Lincoln in Lincoln Cathedral, Lincoln, England
- Shrine of Saint John of Beverley in Beverley Minster, Beverley, England
- Shrine of Saint Jude in the National Shrine of Saint Jude, Faversham, England
- Shrine of Julian of Norwich in Norwich Cathedral, Norwich
- Shrine of Saint Osmund in Trinity Chapel, Salisbury Cathedral, Salisbury
- Shrine of Saint Petroc in Bodmin Parish Church, Bodmin, England
- Shrine of Saint Swithun in Winchester Cathedral, Winchester, England
- Shrine of Saint Thomas de Cantilupe in Hereford Cathedral, Hereford, England
- Shrine of Saint Wilfrid in Ripon Cathedral, Ripon, England
- Shrine of Saint William of York in York Minster, York, England
- Shrine of Saint Winifred (now destroyed) in Shrewsbury Abbey, Shrewsbury, England
- Shrine of Saint Winifred at Holywell, Wales
- Shrine of Saint Wite at the Church of St Candida and Holy Cross, Whitchurch Canonicorum, England
- Shrine of Saint Wulfstan in Worcester Cathedral, Worcester, England
- Shrine of the Tyburn Martyrs in Tyburn Convent, London, England

== North America ==
=== Canada ===
- Basilica of Sainte-Anne-de-Beaupré, Quebec
- Martyrs' Shrine in Midland, Ontario
- Sainte-Anne-du-Bocage in Caraquet, New-Brunswick
- Saint Joseph's Oratory, Montreal
- Notre-Dame-du-Cap Basilica, Trois-Rivières, Quebec
- National Shrine of Our Lady of Perpetual Help, St. Patrick's Church, Toronto, Ontario

=== Mexico ===
- Basilica of Our Lady of Guadalupe in Mexico City

=== United States ===
- Cathedral of Saint Paul, National Shrine of the Apostle Paul; in St. Paul, Minnesota
- Basilica of the National Shrine of the Assumption of the Blessed Virgin Mary; in Baltimore, Maryland
- Blessed Francis Xavier Seelos, National Shrine of; in New Orleans, Louisiana
- Christ the King, Sovereign Priest, Shrine of; in Chicago, Illinois
- National Shrine of The Divine Mercy; in Stockbridge, Massachusetts
- Grotto of Our Lady of Lourdes, National Shrine; in Emmitsburg, Maryland
- The Grotto, The National Sanctuary of Our Sorrowful Mother; in Portland, Oregon
- Holy Hill National Shrine of Mary, Help of Christians in Hubertus, Wisconsin
- Basilica of the National Shrine of the Immaculate Conception; in Washington, D.C.
- Immaculate Conception, Catholic Shrine of the; in Atlanta, Georgia
- Infant Jesus, National Shrine of the; Prague, Oklahoma
- Little Flower, Shrine of the; in Nasonville, Rhode Island
- National Shrine of the Little Flower; in Royal Oak, Michigan
- Basilica of the National Shrine of the Little Flower; San Antonio, Texas
- Mary, Queen of the Universe Shrine; in Orlando, Florida
- Maximilian Kolbe, National Shrine of; Libertyville, Illinois
- Mission San Xavier del Bac; outside Tucson, Arizona
- Most Blessed Sacrament, Shrine of the; in Hanceville, Alabama
- National Shrine of the North American Martyrs; in Auriesville, New York
- Basilica and National Shrine of Our Lady of Consolation; in Carey, Ohio
- Our Lady of Czestochowa:
  - National Shrine of Our Lady of Czestochowa; in Doylestown, Pennsylvania
  - Black Madonna Shrine and Grotto; near Pacific, Missouri
- Our Lady of Fátima, National Blue Army Shrine of; Washington Township, New Jersey
- Our Lady of La Salette, National Shrine of; Attleboro, Massachusetts
- Shrine of Our Lady of Good Help; Brown County, Wisconsin
- Our Lady of Guadalupe:
  - Shrine of Our Lady of Guadalupe; in LaCrosse, Wisconsin
  - Virgin of Guadalupe, The Cathedral Shrine of the; in Dallas, Texas
- Our Lady of Mount Carmel, National Shrine of; in Middletown, New York
- Our Lady of Peace Shrine; in Santa Clara, California
- Basilica of Our Lady of San Juan del Valle – National Shrine; in San Juan, Texas
- Our Lady of the Miraculous Medal, National Shrine of; in Perryville, Missouri
- Our Lady of the Miraculous Medal Shrine; Philadelphia, Pennsylvania
- National Shrine of Our Lady of the Snows; in Belleville, Illinois
- Our Lady of Victory Basilica and National Shrine; in Lackawanna, New York
- National Shrine to Our Lady of Walsingham in Sheboygan, Wisconsin
- Basilica of the National Shrine of St. Ann; in Scranton, Pennsylvania
- The Shrine of St. Bernadette; in Albuquerque, New Mexico
- St. Elizabeth Ann Seton:
  - National Shrine of St. Elizabeth Ann Seton; in Emmitsburg, Maryland
  - Shrine of St. Elizabeth Ann Bayley Seton; in Manhattan, New York
- St. Frances Xavier Cabrini (Mother Cabrini):
  - National Shrine of Saint Frances Xavier Cabrini; in Lincoln Park, Chicago, Illinois
  - St. Frances Xavier Cabrini Shrine; in Washington Heights, Manhattan, New York
  - Mother Cabrini Shrine; in Golden, Colorado
- Saint Francis of Assisi, National Shrine of; in San Francisco, California
- National Shrine of Saint John Neumann; in Philadelphia, Pennsylvania
- Saint Joseph, Shrine of; in St. Louis, Missouri.
- National Shrine of St. Jude; in Chicago, Illinois
- St. Kateri Tekawitha, National Shrine of; in Fonda, New York
- Saint Katharine Drexel Mission Center and Shrine; in Bensalem Township, Pennsylvania
- St. Padre Pio Shrine; in Buena, New Jersey
- Saint Rita of Cascia, National Shrine of; Philadelphia, Pennsylvania
- St. Rose Philippine Duchesne Shrine; in St. Charles, Missouri
- St. Thérèse, National Shrine of; in Darien, Illinois

== South America ==
=== Brazil ===
- Basilica of the National Shrine of Our Lady of Aparecida, Aparecida

=== Ecuador ===
- National Shrine of Our Lady of El Cisne (Nuestra Señora de el Cisne), in El Cisne, Loja.

=== Venezuela ===
- Shrine of Our Lady of Betania, Locally known as Santuario de la Virgen De Betania. The Santuario is Located region knows as Los Valles del Tuy, St Miranda.
- The Basilica of the National Shrine of Our Lady of Coromoto (Our Lady of Coromoto is Also the Patroness of Venezuela). The Basilica is located in Guanare, Capital city of Portuguesa State.

== Oceania ==
=== Australia ===
- St. Mary's Cathedral, Sydney, a minor basilica
- St. Anthony's National Shrine, Hawthorn, Victoria
- National Shrine of Our Lady of Mount Carmel, Melbourne
- National Shrine of Saint Thérèse of Lisieux, Kew, Victoria

== Gallery ==
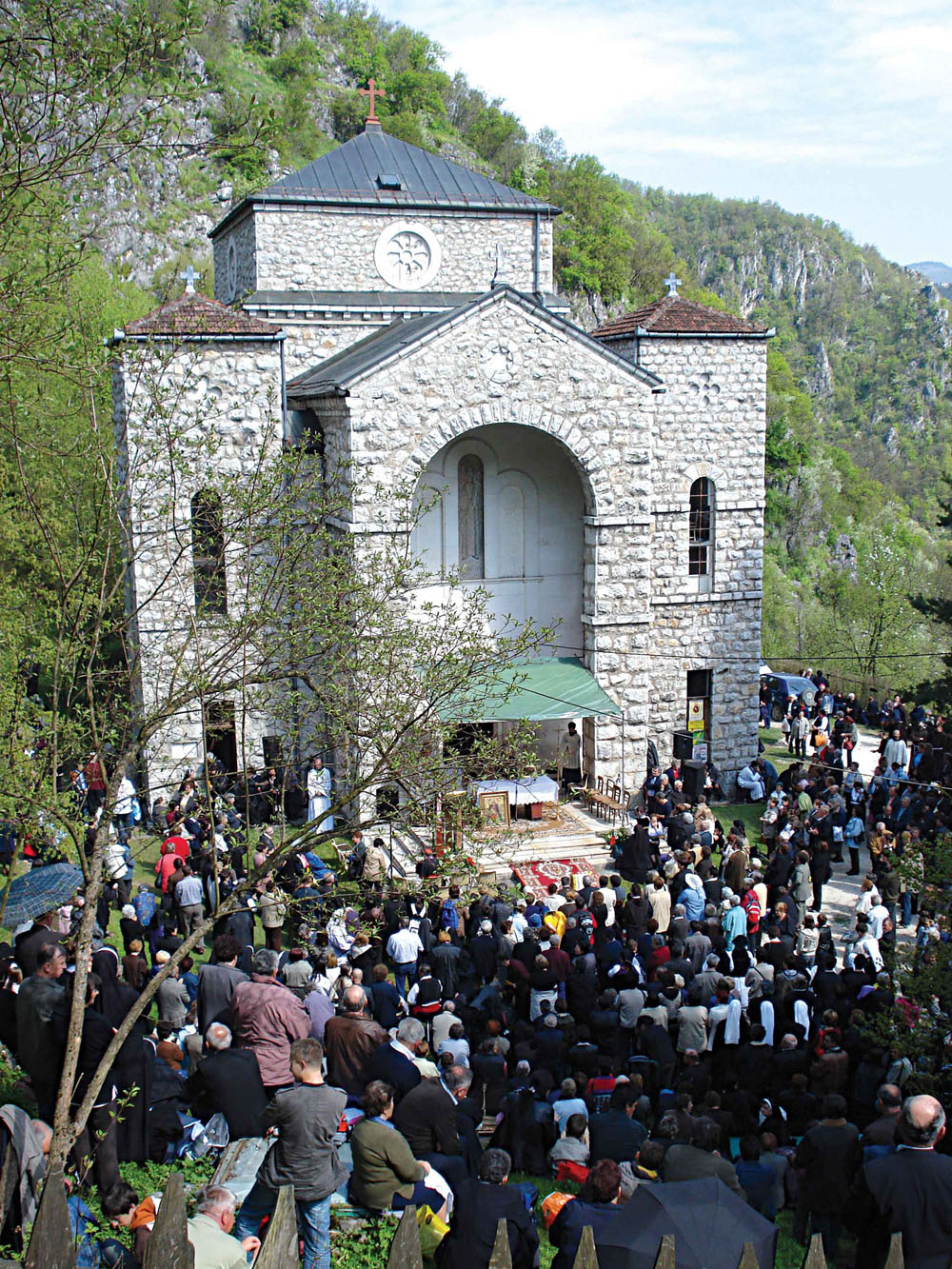
Shrine of Our Lady of Olovo, Bosnia and Herzegovina

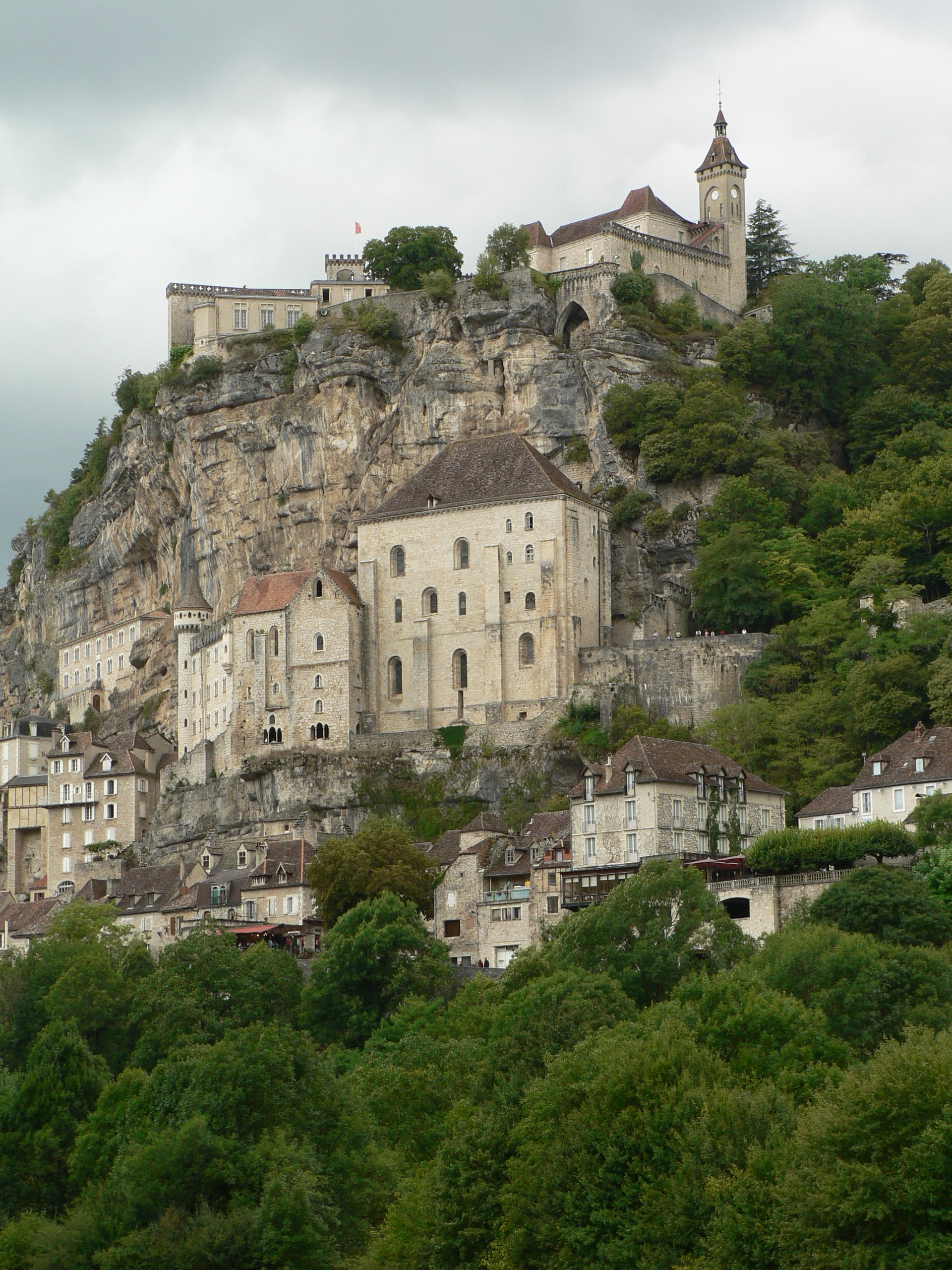
Rocamadour

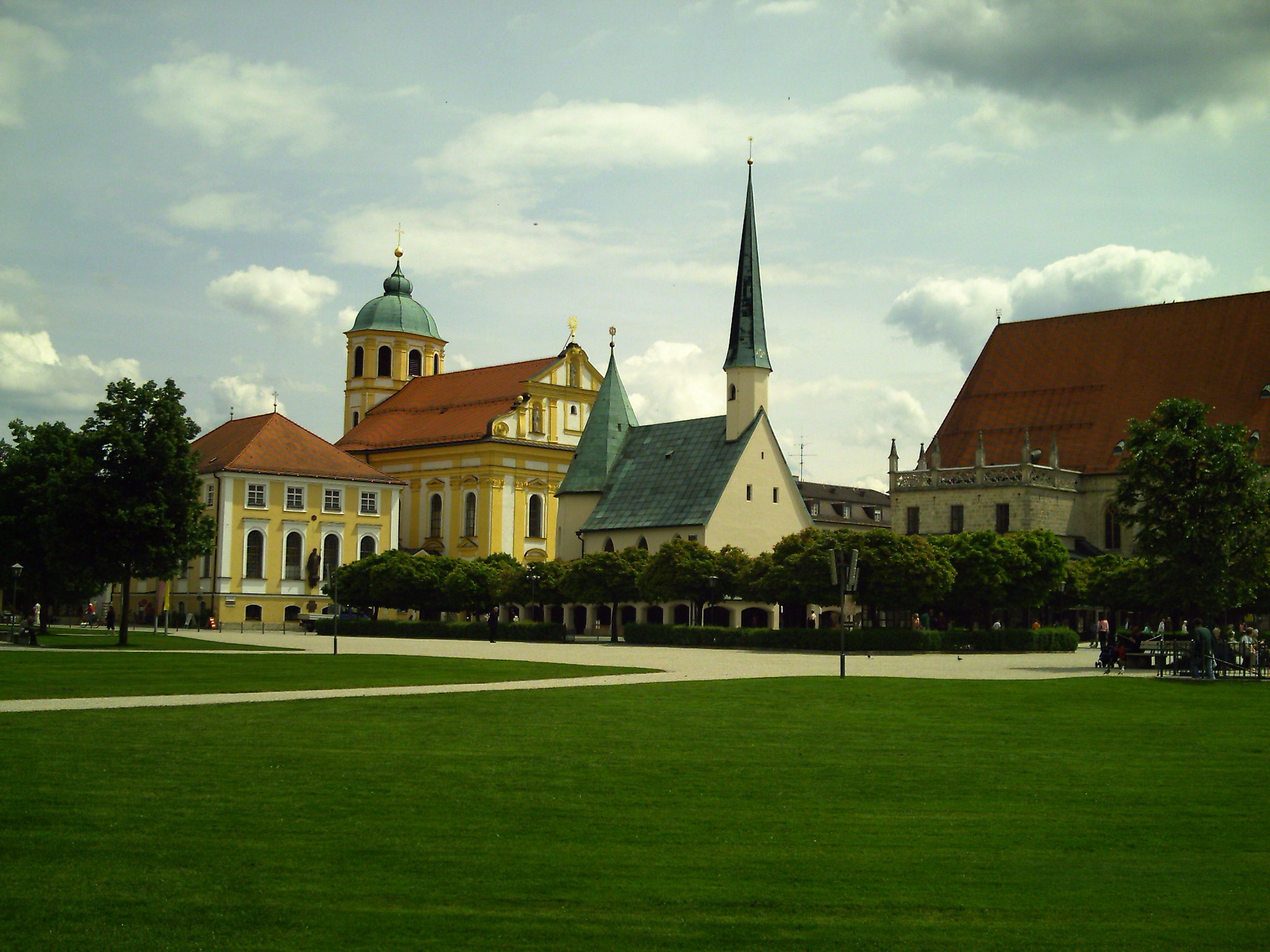
The Chapel of Grace, Altötting

Sanctuary of Fátima

== See also ==
- List of shrines
- Shrines to the Virgin Mary
- Category:Islamic shrines
- Category:Shinto shrines
