= Church of St John in Podmilačje =

Saint John the Baptist Shrine
- Svetište svetog Ive
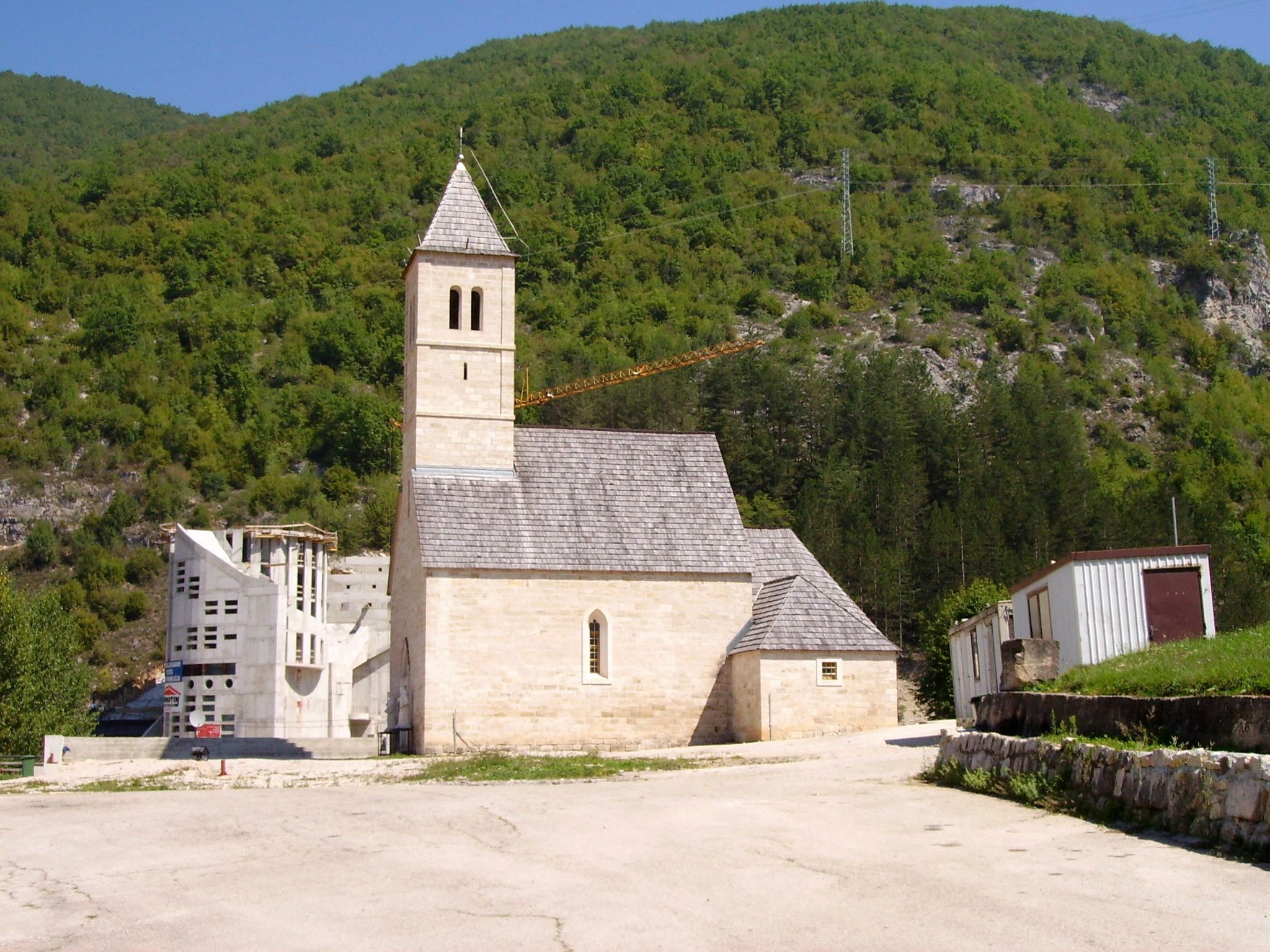
- Medieval church and new church building in construction

- Location within Bosnia and Herzegovina
- Saint John the Baptist Shrine
- 44.375423°N 17.294566°E
- Location: Podmilačje
- Country: Bosnia and Herzegovina
- Denomination: Roman Catholic
- Website: https://zupapodmilacje.com/

History
- Founded: 15th century
- Dedication: Saint John the Baptist

Architecture
- Functional status: Active
- Heritage designation: National Monument
- Designated: 2003
- Style: Gothic
- Completed: 2000
- Demolished: 1993

The Church of St John in Podmilačje is a national monument near Jajce, Bosnia and Herzegovina. The church dates back at least to 1461, and belonged to the parish of Jajce until 1878, when it became an independent parish. It remained in use as a Catholic church throughout the Ottoman period. It became "a shared space of multiconfessional pilgrimage", and was the sole medieval church in Bosnia to survive in continuous use. Catholic, Orthodox and Muslim pilgrims would travel to the church for Saint John's Eve. Extensive renovations and rebuilding were completed in 1910. On 1 March 1993, the church was completely destroyed by Bosnian Serbs during the Bosnian War. In 2000, the church was rebuilt, and in 2003 the Commission to preserve national monuments of Bosnia and Herzegovina gave the site protected designation as a National Monument.
