= Shrine of Our Lady of Matara =

Roman Catholic shrine in Matara, Sri Lanka

Coordinates: 5°56′36″N 80°33′07″E

The Shrine of Our Lady of Matara
- මාතර අප ස්වාමිදුවගේ දේවස්ථානය

Religion
- Affiliation: Roman Catholic
- Interactive map of The Shrine of Our Lady of Matara

Shrine of Our Lady of Matara is a Roman Catholic church devoted to the Virgin Mary, in the town of Matara, Sri Lanka. The shrine houses a statue of the Virgin Mary holding the infant Jesus. Though the statue's origins are unknown, church officials claim that it is 400 years old. The statue has been damaged, lost and recovered more than once, most recently during the 2004 tsunami in Asia, which damaged the shrine and killed 24 people attending Sunday Mass. The church celebrated its centenary year in 2007.

== Claims regarding the statue of Mary ==
Church legend claims that a large wooden crate was hauled out of the sea by Weligama fishermen. When it was opened, the statue was found inside, untouched by seawater. The fishermen handed it over to the parish priest and the statue was placed in St. Mary's Church in Matara.

At a later period, during a cholera epidemic which claimed hundreds of lives, Catholics prayed before the statue to be delivered from the disease. The statue was taken in a solemn procession through the streets of Matara. After a few days, the area was declared safe by the health authorities and there were no further officially reported deaths. Since then the Catholics of Matara have attributed miraculous powers to the intercession of the Blessed Virgin Mary.

In the early 1900s, after over 300 years in the church of Matara, the statue looked faded and worn due to exposure and the thousands of devotees touching and kissing it. Arrangements were made with a sculptor in Ghent, Belgium, to renovate the statue.

== Renovations, loss and recovery ==
When the renovations were complete, the statue was packed in a wooden crate and shipped in the cargo boat Beachy, which set sail from Antwerp. The ship was caught in a fierce storm in the North Sea. It was nearly wrecked but did manage to reach Middlesbrough, England, the next morning. Most of the cargo was found to have been destroyed or thrown overboard. When the ship reached Minicoy, India, it was discovered that the statue had gone missing.

An investigation was initiated by the Bishop of Galle and Belgian priests in the Galle Diocese. These investigations traced the statue to a man in Middlesbrough. When confronted, he refused to hand over the statue unless his demands for money were met. When these demands were refused, he used a hammer to deface the statue, and then threw it away. The statue was recovered and sent back to the restorer in Ghent, who made repairs and repainted it.

The Bishop of Galle, Rt. Rev. Dr. Joseph Van Reeth, took possession of the statue and set sail to Matara in the steamer Princess Alice. When he reached Colombo and looked for his luggage, the crate containing the statue could not be found.

Three days later a Belgian cargo boat named the Uckermarck arrived in Colombo with the missing crate. The excess luggage of the Princess Alice had been loaded onto the Uckermarck, which set sail after the Princess Alice had left Antwerp harbor.

== Miraculous statues of the Blessed Virgin Mary ==
- Statue of Our Lady of Miracles, Jaffna patao
- Shrine of Our Lady of Madhu
