= Basilica of the National Shrine of St. Ann =

- Location within Pennsylvania
- 41°24′8.67″N 75°41′29.43″W
- Location: 1233 St. Ann St. Scranton, Pennsylvania
- Country: United States
- Denomination: Catholic Church
- Website: stannsmonasterybasilica.org

History
- Founder: Passionists
- Dedicated: April 2, 1929

Architecture
- Functional status: Minor Basilica/National shrine
- Architectural type: Romanesque Revival
- Groundbreaking: 1927
- Completed: 1929

Administration
- Diocese: Scranton

The Basilica of the National Shrine of St. Ann is a Minor Basilica and National Shrine of the Catholic Church located in Scranton, Pennsylvania within the Diocese of Scranton.

== Description ==
The first temporary chapel on this site, founded by the Passionist order as a monastery church, was erected in 1902; the present building was dedicated on April 2, 1929. The church was declared a minor basilica by Pope John Paul II on October 27, 1997. The basilica is the site of an annual solemn novena in honor of St. Ann, which draws thousands of pilgrims every year.
