= Our Lady of Snows, Kallikulam =

Church of Our Lady of Snow Kallikulam
- Church of Our Lady of Snow Kallikulam
- 8.352401°N 7.66346°E
- Location: Kallikulam, Tamil Nadu
- Country: India
- Denomination: Roman Catholic
- Website: http://athisayapanimatha.com/ http://www.panimatha.com

History
- Founded: 1770; 256 years ago
- Dedication: St. Mary

Architecture
- Functional status: Active
- Style: Gothic

The Church of Our Lady of Snow is a Roman Catholic Marian church in Kallikulam, Tirunelveli district,[Tuticorin diocese], Tamil Nadu, India. It is one of the Catholic pilgrimage centres in India dedicated to the Blessed Virgin Mary. In Tamil 'Pani' means 'Snow' and 'Matha' means 'Mother'.

== History ==
People inhabited Kallikulam as early as 1700 AD. In 1770 AD, a thatched church was built in the name of Holy Mary by village people. In 1884, Kallikulam villagers and Jesuit Missionaries decided to build a new church at Kallikulam for Mother Mary. In 1886, a church was constructed in that place and consecrated to Our Lady of Snow. Every year, the annual feast of Our Lady of Snow is celebrated from 27 July to 5 August.

== Apparition ==
An oral tradition in Tamil Nadu states that on 29 March 1939 around 6.30 pm, six young people claim that they saw the Mother Mary appear on a hill near to the Church.People from different part of India visit Apparition hill on first Saturday of every month.

== See also ==
- Roman Catholic Marian churches
- Marian apparitions
