= Basilique Marie-Reine-des-Apôtres =

Basilica in Yaoundé, Cameroon

Coordinates: 3°50′33″N 11°30′28″E

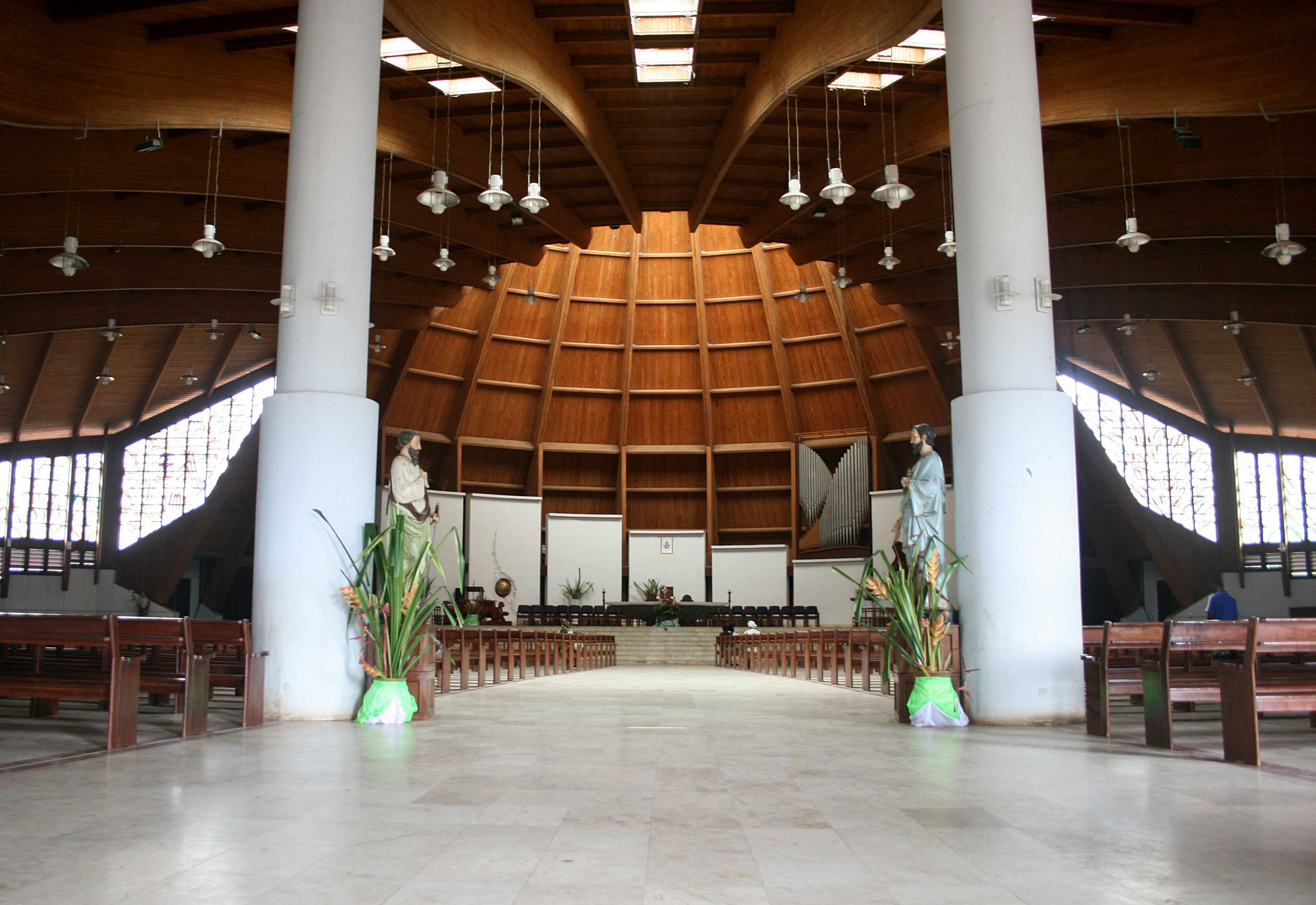
Basilique Marie-Reine-des-Apôtres

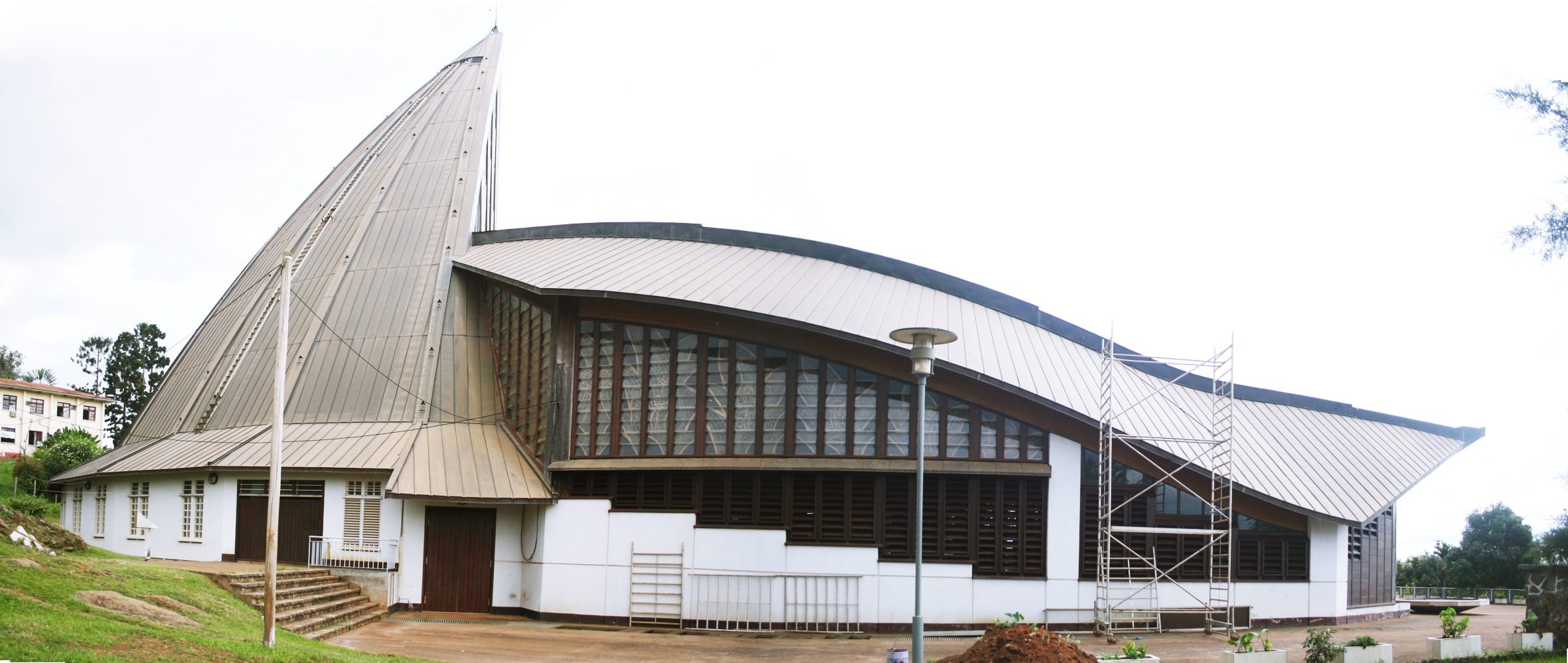
Front view of the Queen Mary of the Apostles Basilica

The Basilique Marie-Reine-des-Apôtres (Mary Queen of the Apostles Basilica) is a Roman Catholic basilica dedicated to the Blessed Virgin Mary located in Yaoundé, Cameroon. The basilica is under the circumscription of the Archdiocese of Yaoundé. The basilica is built on the site of the first church built by the Missionaries of the Holy Spirit in Cameroon. The church was dedicated on March 2, 2006.
