= Our Lady of Bekaa =

Marian shrine in Zahlé, Lebanon

Coordinates: 33°50′27″N 35°54′7″E

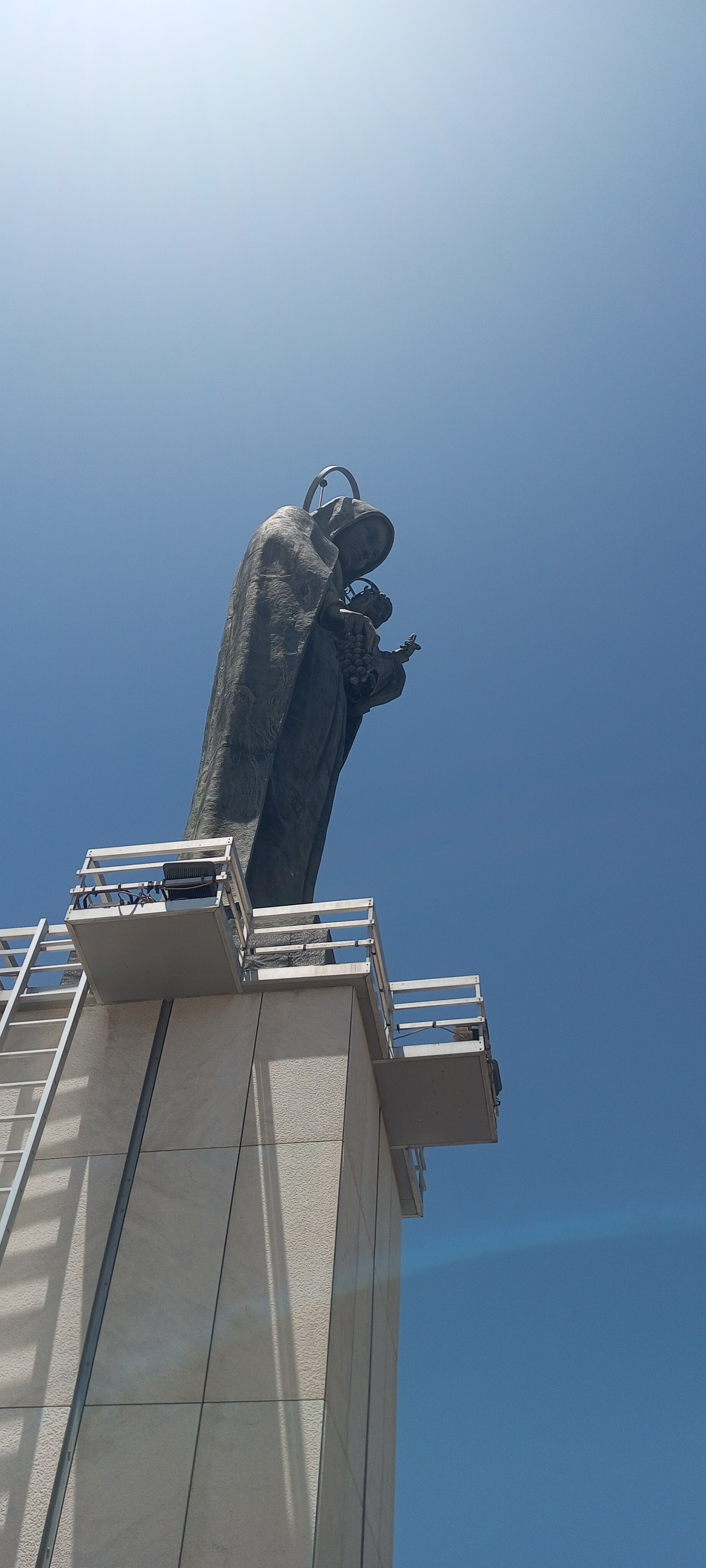
Our Lady of Zahle from its building's roof

Our Lady of Zahle is a Marian shrine located in the city of Zahlé in the Beqaa Valley of Lebanon.

In 1958, Bishop Euthym, a man of great devotion to Our Lady, decided to build a shrine in honor of the Virgin Mary on the top of a hill overlooking Zahle and the Bekaa Valley. A ten-meter-high bronze statue of the Virgin Mary, the work of the Italian artist, Pierroti, rests on a 54 meter high tower, crowning a hill known by the name of Tel Chiha. Work on the shrine was delayed for years because of the Lebanese civil war, but a grand inauguration was held in May 2005 after restoration work was completed on the statue. An elevator takes pilgrims and tourists up to a viewing platform overlooking the red-roofed city and offering panoramic views of the valley. The base of the tower houses a small chapel that seats about 100 people.

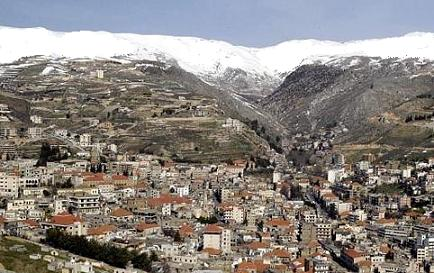
View of Zahlé from Our Lady of the Bekaa
