= The Shrine of St. Bernadette =

Church in Albuquerque, New Mexico

Coordinates: 35.102111°N 106.519443°W

The Shrine of St. Bernadette is a Roman Catholic church in Albuquerque, New Mexico, United States.

== History ==
From the very start of the parish in 1959, people of various backgrounds developed into a dynamic Christian community of nearly three thousand families. Today, half are of Spanish or Mexican ancestry, many of their families having arrived here over four centuries ago. The other half are people of diverse nationalities including Native American, African, Canadian, European, and Asian.

In 2001, the pastor was presented with a list of major problems which needed immediate attention, including electrical re-wiring and replacing broken water pipes. After much prayer, he assembled a building committee composed of professional architects, contractors, liturgical artists and designers, and members of the parish councils and staff to assist him in the church renovation. The church was literally gutted forcing Masses to be celebrated in the Parish Hall for nearly a year.

On the Feast of St. Bernadette, April 16, 2002, Archbishop Michael Sheehan celebrated a Mass honoring the re-dedication of the church. The Archbishop was visibly inspired by the church's new appearance. Realizing this, Father Tom wrote to the Archbishop of Santa Fe and asked if he would consider elevating the church to the status of shrine. Though the archbishop's decision was swift, it was a real surprise to those involved to find exactly how much study and research goes into elevating a parish to a shrine.

On October 7, 2003, Feast of Our Lady of the Rosary, once again, Archbishop Sheehan joined the pastor and more than eight hundred parishioners to proclaim that "St. Bernadette Church will henceforth be known as the Shrine of St. Bernadette." During the Mass of Proclamation, Archbishop Sheehan read letters of congratulations from the Bishop of Nevers, France, from the Superior General of the Sisters of Charity and Christian Instruction (the congregation to which St. Bernadette belonged) and from Emile Soubirous, the Great Grand-Nephew of St. Bernadette.

One of the reasons the archbishop raised the church to a shrine is the relics and artifacts given by the Sisters of Nevers, France and from the Shrine of Lourdes. To celebrate the elevation of the shrine of "their" saint, the Superior General of the Congregation sent a lock of St. Bernadette's hair, a sleeping sock worn during the saint's final years of suffering, a replica of St. Bernadette's writing book and many quality photographs which are displayed in the Bernadette Chapel at the Shrine. The Rector of the Shrine of Lourdes, France, sent several important gifts which are on display in the Bernadette Chapel including a large piece of the rock from the Grotto of Massabielle where Our Lady appeared to Bernadette eighteen times in 1858.

The Albuquerque Shrine has maintained close links with Lourdes and Nevers, France. The Rector of the Shrine of Lourdes, France traveled 3,000 miles to visit the New Mexico Shrine in March 2005. During his visit, he announced that the Albuquerque Shrine was being appointed an official distributor of Lourdes Water in the Southwestern United States. Lourdes Water is shipped by air to the Albuquerque Shrine so that visitor and pilgrims may take home with them, the authentic water from the spring which Mary asked Bernadette to dig.

In preparation for the 150th anniversary of the apparitions of Our Lady of Lourdes, the Shrine commissioned a new statue of St. Bernadette by Albuquerque artist Tim Hooton. Two bronze statues were ordered. One for the New Mexico Shrine and the other, donated to the Shrine at Lourdes, France. A group of sixty-six pilgrims from New Mexico joined the artist and his wife at the dedication of the statue at Lourdes in June 2008. The statue was installed at the entrance of the Saint Bernadette Church across from the Grotto and the River du Pau.
