= Motlatsi Meshack Phomane =

South African Catholic prelate (born 1975)

The Most Reverend Motlatsi Meshack Phomane
- Bishop-Elect of Bethlehem in South Africa
- Church: Catholic Church
- Archdiocese: Roman Catholic Archdiocese of Bloemfontein
- See: Diocese of Bethlehem in South Africa
- Appointed: 14 April 2026
- Installed: 4 July 2026
- Predecessor: Jan de Groef (31 December 2008 – 14 April 2026)
- Successor: Incumbent

Orders
- Ordination: 30 June 2012
- Consecration: 4 July 2026 by Sithembele Sipuka
- Rank: Bishop

Personal details
- Born: Motlatsi Meshack Phomane; 14 November 1975 (age 50) Tshenola, Matatiele, Diocese of Umtata, Eastern Cape, South Africa

Styles of Motlatsi Meshack Phomane
- Reference style: Your Lordship; The Most Reverend
- Spoken style: His Lordship
- Religious style: Bishop

Motlatsi Meshack Phomane (born 14 November 1975) is a South African Catholic prelate who was appointed bishop of the Roman Catholic Diocese of Bethlehem, South Africa on 14 April 2026. Before that, from 30 June 2012 until 14 April 2026, he served as a priest of the Roman Catholic Diocese of Umtata, South Africa. He was appointed bishop by Pope Leo XIV. His episcopal consecration took place on 4 July 2026.

== Early life and education ==
Motlatsi Meshack Phomane was born on 14 November 1975 at Tshenola, Matatiele, Diocese of Umtata, Eastern Cape, South Africa. He studied at the Saint Philip Neri Pre-Orientation Seminary in Port Elizabeth (today: Gqeberha). He then continued his studies at the Saint Kizito Preparatory Seminary in Verulam, in KwaZulu-Natal. He studied philosophy at the Saint Peter's Seminary in Garsfontein, in Gauteng. He then studied theology at the Saint John Vianney Major Seminary in Pretoria. He holds a diploma in business management awarded by the University of South Africa where he studied from 2012 until 2013. From 2015 until 2018, he studied at the Catholic University of Eastern Africa in Nairobi, Kenya where he graduated with a Licentiate in canon law.

== Priest ==
He was ordained a priest for the Diocese of Umtata, South Africa, on 30 June 2012. He served as a priest until 14 April 2026. While a priest, he served in various roles and locations, including:

- Studies at the University of South Africa, leading to the award of a diploma in business management from 2012 until 2013.
- Chancellor of the diocese of Umtata from 2013 until 2015.
- Parish priest of Saint John the Baptist Parish, Port Saint Johns, Umtata, from 2013 until 2015.
- Diocesan financial administrator, Catholic Diocese of Umtata from 2013 until 2015.
- Studies at the Catholic University of Eastern Africa, in Nairobi, Kenya leading to the award of a licentiate in canon law from 2015 until 2018.
- Parish priest of Saint Martin Parish, Tlokoeng (formerly Mount Fletcher), Umtata from 2019 until 2025.
- Diocesan representative for the Pastoral Conference, Sotho Region from 2013 until 2026.
- Diocesan translator for the Sesotho language from 2016 until 2026.
- Member of the Metropolitan Ecclesiastical Tribunal, Durban Catholic Archdiocese from 2019 until 2026.
- Member of the College of Consultors, for the Diocese of Umtata from 2021 until 2021.
- Parish priest of Mount Nicholas Parish, Libode, Umtata from 2025 until 2026.
- Chaplain for the diocesan Committee for the Synod from 2025 until 2026.
- Member of the diocesan Financial Committee from 2025 until 2026.

== Bishop ==
On 14 April 2026, Pope Leo XIV appointed Reverend Father Motlatsi Meshack Phomane, previously a member of the clergy of the Catholic Diocese of Umtata, as the new bishop of the Diocese of Bethlehem in South Africa. The bishop-elect succeeds Bishop Jan de Groef, whose age-related retirement was accepted by The Holy Father that same day. The episcopal consecration of the new bishop took place on 4 July 2026. The Principal Consecrator was Sithembele Sipuka, Archbishop of Cape Town who was assisted by Zolile Peter Mpambani, Archbishop of Bloemfontein and Jan de Groef, Bishop Emeritus of Bethlehem.

== See also ==
- Catholic Church in South Africa

== Succession table ==
Catholic Church titles
Preceded by Jan de Groef (31 December 2008 – 14 April 2026)	Bishop of Bethlehem in South Africa (since 14 April 2026)	Succeeded by (Incumbent)
