= Ngome Marian Shrine =

Shrine in Ngome, KwaZulu-Natal, South Africa

The Ngome Marian Shrine is a shrine dedicated to the Blessed Virgin Mary in Ngome, KwaZulu-Natal, where Sister Reinolda May, member of the Benedictine Sisters of Tutzing, experienced ten visions between 22 August 1955 and 2 May 1971. In these apparitions, the Virgin Mary appeared to her and identified herself as "the Tabernacle of the Most High." Although veneration was not initially supported by the local bishop, the site became a popular destination for pilgrims, and in the 1990s was acknowledged by the diocese as a "place of prayer," with organized pilgrimage actively promoted. It is one of the most popular pilgrim's sites in southern Africa.

== Sister Reinolda May ==
Servant of God Reinolda May O.S.B.

Religious
- Born: 21 October 1901; Pfahlheim, Ostalbkreis, Ellwangen, Germany
- Died: 1 April 1981 (aged 79); Inkamana, Vryheid, South Africa
- Venerated in: Roman Catholic Church

Sister Reinolda May was born as Fraziska May on 21 October 1901 in Pfahlheim, a small village in the Roman Catholic Diocese of Rottenburg-Stuttgart. She was baptized as Francisca, and went to a boarding school in Hochaltingen, where she was taught domestic science by Franciscan Sisters. She entered the local convent and became interested in the mission. Her parish priest, Fr. Eugene Adis, suggested she join the Benedictine Sisters of Tutzing, a missionary order, but this was disallowed on health grounds. She tried again and was accepted in 1922, and professed in 1925. She left for the mission in South Africa in 1925 and it was there that she pronounced her final vows in 1928. For ten years she worked in Mbongolwane in KwaZulu-Natal and at Inkamana Abbey. She learned Zulu and when the Sisters were allowed to assist in childbirth she began a study of midwifery, the first sister in Zululand to do so. She obtained her diploma in 1938 and in the same year opened the maternity section in the Benedictine Mission Hospital in Nongoma. From then on, Sister Reinolda became a popular and well-known figure in the district, earning a nickname from the local Zulus (Sister Mashiyane, on account of her bushy eyebrows). She led the section until the government takeover of the hospital in 1976. During her tenure, 28,000 births were registered there. After retiring, she continued to visit the sick and the dying in the hospital, and in 1980 was diagnosed with colon cancer. She died at Inkamana on 1 April 1981, and is buried at Inkamana Abbey.

== The apparitions ==
Sr. Reinolda had a total of ten Marian visions, preceded by an unusual occurrence, in December 1954: she perceived two figures, a woman in white and a monk. The woman held something covered in her right hand; the monk held something like an offering. Something ascended like incense, then the figures disappeared. Eight months later, the visions of the Virgin began.

1. 22 August 1955: Right after receiving Communion, the Virgin showed herself, stating she wished to be venerated as "the Tabernacle of the Most High" and encouraging Sr. Reinolda to tell her priest.
2. 20 October 1955: Similar to the first vision, but with the added injunction to tell everyone.
3. 22 October 1955: Similar to the second.
4. 15 March 1956: The Virgin pointed northwest, asking "a sanctuary be built at a place where seven springs well up and meet," to allow graces to flow and for people to be converted.
5. 5 June 1956
6. 15 March 1957
7. 24 May 1957
8. 17 April 1958: In this vision, she felt a need for an image. Bishop Bilgeri of Eshowe consented to a picture following Sr. Reinolda's descriptions.
9. 28 March 1970: Sr. Reinolda saw the Devil, after which "Mary, the Tabernacle of the Most High" comforted her, and pointed to the archangel Saint Michael, who stood on the other side with a lance, and wearing a breastplate, with a cherub in white standing next to him.
10. 2 May 1971: The image of “Mary, the Tabernacle of the Most High”, came alive.

== History of the shrine ==
In the fourth vision, the apparition had asked for a shrine to be built near the abbey at a place where seven streams meet. By the seventh vision, Sr. Reinolda was certain it should be built at Ngome, and indeed wells were found in the forest near the Ngome school. A chapel was built, and as it happened the site was also sacred to the local Zulu population. It was consecrated at Pentecost 1966. The picture of "Our Lady the Tabernacle of the Most High" was placed in the chapel.

Pilgrimage to the site began in March 1966, but soon afterward they were stopped by Bishop Bilgeri. From the first vision on, Sr. Reinolda shared her experiences with the local priests, who showed reluctance and referred her to the bishop, to whom she wrote a number of times in the next decade. He did not want the visions to be publicized, and while he consented to the painting and the small chapel he refused to have a bigger church built; he maintained this attitude until his death in 1973. Popular veneration at the shrine continued unabated; people traveled from far and wide to pray at the chapel and collect water from the springs. A 1976 commission headed by two Benedictine priests decided the use of Ngome as a pilgrimage site would be of great benefit, and that pilgrimage and veneration (though not use of the spring water) should be allowed. Then-Bishop Biyase, however, would not allow organized pilgrimages.

When St. Reinolda died in 1981, interest again increased, and local Catholic Mrs. Rose-Marie Foxon, wrote the Holy See as well as other parishes in South Africa. People continued traveling privately, now in greater numbers, especially after Foxon also wrote to the local media speaking of the visions. In 1984, a new church was built at the site; it was dedicated to the Virgin Mary without any specific title. In 1988, the Ngome Shrine committee was formed, comprising priests of the diocese. By that time, Bishop Biyase was wavering, saying he could and would not suppress the devotion. In 1989, the committee published a booklet and postcards featuring the shrine were being printed, while the congregation played an ever-increasing role in the local church.

Finally in 1992, Bishop Biyase blessed an open-air altar, part of a bigger chapel that replaced the little shrine, allowing for the place to be designated a place of prayer, and active promotion of organized pilgrimages. Since then, the priest at Inkamana Abbey has been the shrine custodian. There are reports of miraculous and spontaneous healing at the shrine, and comparisons with Lourdes are drawn. The water from the spring is still collected, and visitors dip their feet in the water during prayer. Four nuns live on site at the shrine to receive visitors; local women cook food for pilgrims, who in turn leave old clothes for the locals. The shrine is one of the most popular Christian pilgrimage sites in Africa. Sister Reinolda May's apparitions were the first in a series of Marian visions throughout Africa; in the 1980s, visions of Mary were seen in Kenya, Zaire, Mozambique, Rwanda, South Africa, and Cameroon.
