= Inkamana Abbey =

- Location within KwaZulu-Natal Location within South Africa
- Interactive map of Inkamana Abbey

Monastery information
- Other name: Sacred Heart Abbey
- Order: Ottilien Congregation, OSB
- Established: 1922
- Mother house: St. Ottilien Archabbey
- Diocese: Eshowe

People
- Abbot: Father Boniface Kamushishi
- Important associated figures: 42 (2009)

Site
- Location: Vryheid, KwaZulu-Natal, South Africa
- Coordinates: 27°49′07″S 30°48′53″E

Inkamana Abbey, also called Sacred Heart Abbey, Inkamana, is a Benedictine abbey in Vryheid, KwaZulu-Natal, South Africa, in the Roman Catholic Diocese of Eshowe. It belongs to the Ottilien Congregation.

== History ==
The abbey was established as a mission on 3 August 1922, after the Ottilien Congregation received permission to do missionary work in the Apostolic Vicariate of Natal. The mission was headed by apostolic vicar Thomas Spreiter, who had been working in German East Africa since 1900. With the help of the Benedictine Sisters of Tutzing, a high school was built, where Spreiter taught religion. A newly built monastery building was finished in 1949, and a church was consecrated in 1953.

On 21 June 1968, the abbey was promoted to the rank of conventual priory, and on 25 February it became an abbey. Since 29 June 1998, the abbey's monks also oversee the former mission house of the Missionary Oblates of Mary Immaculate, the St. Boniface House Waldfrieden, 50 km north-west of Windhoek, where they work with the Missionary Benedictine Sisters of Tutzing. A training school for Inkamana's young monks was founded in 1992 in Howick, and moved in 1998 to nearby Cedara. Its current abbot is Godfrey Sieber, also the author of a history of the mission.

The abbey's priest is also the custodian of the Ngome Marian Shrine, where between 1955 and 1971 the Blessed Virgin Mary appeared ten times to Sister Reinolda May of the Missionary Benedictine Sisters. Sister Reinolda, who died on 1 April 1981, is buried at Inkamana Abbey.

During a 1997 fire in the hospice, three bed-ridden patients died, as did Sr. Ann Thole, who tried to rescue them.
