= Siegfried Jwara =

South African Catholic prelate

Siegfried Mandla Jwara CMM
- Archbishop of Durban
- Church: Catholic Church
- Archdiocese: Archdiocese of Durban
- Appointed: 9 June 2021
- Predecessor: Wilfrid Napier
- Other post: Apostolic Administrator of Ingwavuma (2021-2023)
- Previous posts: Titular Bishop of Elephantaria in Proconsulari (2016-2021); Vicar apostolic of Ingwavuma (2016-2021)

Orders
- Ordination: 14 February 1987
- Consecration: 25 June 2016 by José Luís Gerardo Ponce de León

Personal details
- Born: 1 February 1957 (age 69) St. Nivard (modern-day St Nivads?), Province of Natal, Union of South Africa

Siegfried Mandla Jwara, CMM (born 1 February 1957) is a South African Catholic prelate who has served as Archbishop of Durban since 2021. He was previously Apostolic Vicar of Ingwavuma beginning in 2016. He is a member of the Mariannhillers.

== Biography ==
Siegfried Jwara was born on 1 February 1957 in Saint Nivard, KwaZulu-Natal, South Africa. He was named Siegfried after the priest who baptized him. After attending the Kwa-Hluzingqondo School in uMkhomazi and completing his high school studies, he entered the Congregation of the Missionaries of Mariannhill on 1 February 1981. He took his first religious vows on 24 September 1984 and his final vows in 1986. He completed his studies in philosophy and theology at Saint Joseph's Theological Institute in Cedara from 1982 to 1986. He was ordained a deacon on 31 May 1986 by Bishop Mansuet Biyase of Eshowe and a priest on 14 February 1987 by Bishop Paul Themba Mngoma of Mariannhill.

He was parish vicar at the Clairvaux Mission in Mpendle in the Diocese of Mariannhill from 1987 to 1992. He obtained a diploma in Human Development, Leadership, Formation & Community Building at the Institute of Saint Anselm in London during the year 1992–1993. He was master of novices at Mariannhill Monastery, briefly rector at Merrivale, and then provincial counsellor of his order from 1993 to 1998. In 1998 he earned a master's degree in theology from the University of KwaZulu-Natal in Pietermaritzburg. He has also served as superior of the Mariannhill Province from 1998 to 2002 and general counsellor at the order's headquarters in Rome from 2002 to 2004.

Next he was a parish priest in Port Saint Johns and in the Saint Patrick Mission of the diocese of Umtata, and then again counsellor from 2005 to 2006 and provincial superior of the order from 2006 to 2009. He returned to the diocese of Umtata as parish priest of Saint Patrick, diocesan consultor and dean of the eastern deanery from 2009 to 2014. He was regional superior of that diocese and again parish priest of the Saint Patrick Mission from 2014 to 2016.

On 30 April 2016, Pope Francis appointed apostolic vicar of Ingwavuma and named him titular bishop of Elephantaria in Proconsulari. He received his episcopal consecration the following 25 June from Bishop José Luís Ponce de León of Manzini, his predecessor in Ingwavuma.

He was elected by the Southern African Catholic Bishops' Conference as one of its two representatives at the 2018 synod of bishops on youth and discernment.

In February 2020, Jwara joined 15 Catholic bishops in the Global Campaign for Peace and Justice in Cameroon, asking President Paul Biya to accept the Swiss government's offer of arbitration to end the sectarian violence there.

On 9 June 2021, Pope Francis named him to succeed Cardinal Wilfrid Napier as Archbishop of Durban.
