= Diocese of Mariannhill =

Latin Catholic diocese in South Africa

Coordinates: 33.5833°S 22.2000°E

Diocese of Mariannhill Dioecesis Collis Mariae seu Mariannhillensis

Location
- Country: South Africa
- Metropolitan: Durban

Statistics
- Area: 12,612 km^{2} (4,870 sq mi)
- Population: Total; Catholics: (as of 2004); 1,819,400; 284,400 (15.6%)

Information
- Denomination: Catholic Church
- Sui iuris church: Latin Church
- Rite: Roman Rite

Current leadership
- Pope: Leo XIV
- Bishop: Neil Augustine Frank
- Bishops emeritus: Pius Mlungisi Dlungwana

The Diocese of Mariannhill (Latin: Collis Mariae/Mariannhillen(sis)) is a Latin Catholic diocese located in the city of Mariannhill in the ecclesiastical province of Durban in South Africa.

== History ==
In 1880, at the request of Bishop James David Ricards of the Eastern Vicariate of the Cape of Good Hope, Trappist Franz Pfanner abbot of Mariastern Abbey in Banja Luka, Bosnia and Herzegovina, established a monastery near Sundays River Valley, South Africa. Due to drought and wind the site proved unsuitable and with the permission of Bishop Charles Jolivet, O.M.I., of the Natal Vicariate, Pfanner and his companions relocated to a part of the Zoekoegat farm, near Pinetown.

He named it Mariannhill after St. Mary and St. Anne. As their missionary activity was not entirely compatible with the contemplative focus of the Trappists, in 1909 upon the recommendation of Edmond Obrecht, abbot of the Abbey of Our Lady of Gethsemani, the Holy See separated the monks of Mariannhill from the Trappists, forming the Congregation of the Missionaries of Mariannhill (CMM). In 1904 Henri Delalle C.M.M. was appointed Apostolic vicar for Natal.

On September 10, 1921, the Apostolic Vicariate of Mariannhill was established from the Apostolic Vicariate of Natal. The first apostolic vicars were members of the CMM. The Diocese of Mariannhill was erected on January 11, 1951, as suffragan to the Metropolitan Archdiocese of Durban. The Diocese measures 12,612 square kilometers. As of 2017, the diocese had a population of about 329,575 Catholics.

St. Joseph's Cathedral was built in 1908, and is the seat of the Bishop of Mariannhill.

Bishop Adalbert Fleischer founded the Franciscans Familiars of St. Joseph's (FFJ). Paul Themba Mngoma was appointed bishop on March 14, 1981; he was the first African Bishop of the Mariannhill Diocese. Mngoma worked to increase the number of indigenous clergy.

In response to a request from Bishop Pius Dlungwane for an Apostolic Visitation, Pope Francis appointed the Archbishop Emeritus of Pretoria in South Africa, William Slattery O.F.M. to visit Mariannhill and meetings and consult with the clergy, religious and laity of the Diocese. As a result of the visitation, in September 2020, Slattery was named apostolic administrator of the diocese, while Bishop Dlungwane remained its spiritual head. In December 2021, Mons. Neil Augustine Frank, Provincial Superior of OMI in South Africa, was appointed Coadjutor Bishop. Frank noted that Marianhill is almost completely a Zulu speaking Diocese, "...and this is great for the inculturation of the faith." Bishop Mlungisi retired in October 2022.

== Bishops ==
Vicars Apostolic of Mariannhill (Roman rite)

- Joseph Adalbert Fleischer, C.M.M. (1922.03.22 – 1950)
- Alphonse Streit, C.M.M. (1950.12.23 – 1951.01.11)

Bishops of Mariannhill (Roman rite)

- Alphonse Streit, C.M.M. (1951.01.11 – 1970)
- Martin Elmar Schmid, C.M.M. (1970.05.21 – 1980.06.18)
- Paul Themba Mngoma (1981.03.14 – 2005.02.07)
- Pius Mlungisi Dlungwana (3 June 2006 – 13 October 2022)
- Neil Augustine Frank (13 October 2022 – present)

=== Auxiliary Bishops ===
  - Bishop Pius Bonaventura Dlamini, F.F.J. (1967.12.14 – 1981.09.13)
  - Bishop Pius Mlungisi Dlungwana (2000.06.02 - 2006.06.03), appointed Bishop here

=== Other priests of this diocese who became bishops ===
- Mansuet Dela Biyase, appointed Bishop of Eshowe in 1975

== See also ==
- Odilo Weeger
- Catholic Church in South Africa

== Sources ==
- GCatholic.org
- Catholic Hierarchy
