= Sithembele Sipuka =

South African Catholic prelate (born 1960)

The Most Reverend Sithembele Sipuka
- Archbishop of Cape Town, South Africa
- Church: Catholic Church
- Archdiocese: Archdiocese of Cape Town
- See: Cape Town
- Appointed: 9 January 2026
- Installed: 14 March 2026
- Predecessor: Cardinal Stephen Brislin
- Successor: Incumbent

Orders
- Ordination: 17 December 1988
- Consecration: 3 May 2008 by Oswald Georg Hirmer
- Rank: Archbishop

Personal details
- Born: Sithembele Sipuka; 27 April 1960 (age 66) Idutywa, Diocese of Queenstown, Eastern Cape, South Africa
- Motto: "UNITED AND SENT"
- Coat of arms

Styles of Sithembele Sipuka
- Reference style: Your Lordship; The Most Reverend
- Spoken style: His Lordship
- Religious style: Bishop

Sithembele Sipuka (born 27 April 1960) is a South African Catholic prelate, the Metropolitan Archbishop of the Roman Catholic Archdiocese of Cape Town. Before that, from 8 February 2008 until 9 January 2026, he was the bishop of the Roman Catholic Diocese of Umtata, South Africa. Pope Benedict XVI appointed him bishop in 2008. He was consecrated and installed at Umtata, Diocese of Umtata, on 3 May 2008 by Oswald Georg Hirmer, Bishop Emeritus of Umtata. On 9 January 2026, Pope Leo XIV transferred him to Cape Town and appointed him Metropolitan Archbishop there. His installation at Cape Town was held on 14 March 2026 at GrandWest. He received the pallium on 29 June 2026, bestowed upon him by His Holiness on the Day of the Feast of Sts Peter & Paul.

== Background and education ==
He was born on 27 April 1960, in Idutywa, Diocese of Queenstown, Eastern Cape, South Africa. He studied at the Saint John Vianney Major Seminary. He studied at the Pontifical Urban University in Rome, Italy from 1992, graduating from there in 1994 with a Licentiate in systematic theology.

== Priesthood ==
He was ordained a priest of the Diocese of Queenstown on 17 December 1988. He served as a priest until 8 February 2008. While a priest, he served in various roles and locations including:

- Parish vicar of Qoqodala and of Lady Frere.
- Parish priest in Cofimvaba from 1989 until 1991.
- Studies in Rome at the Pontifical Urban University, leading to the award of a licentiate in systematic theology from 1992 until 1994.
- Lecturer in philosophy of religion and liturgy at Saint Peter's Major Seminary of Philosophy in Pretoria from 1994 until 1995.
- Lecturer in fundamental and Eucharistic theology at the Saint John Vianney Major Seminary of Theology from 1994 until 1995.
- Vice rector and then acting rector of Saint Peter's Seminary from 1996 until 1999.
- Rector of the Saint John Vianney Major Seminary from 2000 until 2008.

== As bishop ==
On 8 February 2008 Pope Benedict XVI appointed him bishop of the Diocese of Umtata. He was consecrated at Umtata on 3 May 2008. The Principal Consecrator was Oswald Georg Hirmer, Bishop Emeritus of Umtata assisted by Paul Mandla Khumalo, Bishop of Witbank and Herbert Nikolaus Lenhof, Bishop of Queenstown. From 2019 until 2024, he served two consecutive terms as president of the Southern African Catholic Bishops' Conference (SACBC). He also served as vice president of the Symposium of Episcopal Conferences of Africa and Madagascar (SECAM) from 2019 until 2022.

On 9 January 2026, Pope Leo XIV transferred Bishop Sithembele Sipuka, previously bishop of the Catholic Diocese of Mthatha, to the Metropolitan Archdiocese of Cape Town in South Africa, and appointed him the Local Ordinary there. His installation at Cape Town was held on 14 March 2026.

== See also ==
- Catholic Church in South Africa

== Succession table ==
Catholic Church titles
Preceded by Stephen Brislin	Archbishop of Cape Town; 9 January 2026 – present	Incumbent
Preceded by Oswald Georg Hirmer	Bishop of Umtata; 8 February 2008 – 9 January 2026	Vacant
