= Odilo Weeger =

- Born: 14 October 1912; Arberg, German Empire
- Died: 8 June 2006 (aged 93); Bulawayo, Zimbabwe
- Occupations: Priest and Missionary

Rev. Fr. Odilo (Otto) Weeger, CMM (14 October 1912 – 8 June 2006) was a Catholic missionary in Matabeleland, Southern Africa. He arrived in Africa in July 1938 and was based at Mariannhill in Natal, South Africa. He was later transferred to Southern Rhodesia where he worked at St. Patrick's in Bulawayo before moving to Lukosi, near Hwange in 1939.

== Missionary work in Matabeleland ==
In the North of Matebeleland, he travelled by bicycle from St. Mary's Lukosi to Hwange, Victoria Falls, Matetsi and Gwayi River. He built and established many schools, including those in Gwayi, Binga, Dete and Lupane and later went to Fatima where he opened a mission hospital and school.

With the support of friends in Germany, who were doctors, he opened St. Luke's Hospital in Lupane. In 1958, he returned to Bulawayo, where he was the parish priest at St. Mary's Cathedral. He was appointed Provincial Superior of Mariannhill Missionaries, a post he held from 1970 to 1982. He was Parish priest for many years of the Hillside parish of Christ the King.

Weeger was awarded the Verdienstkreuz – Erster Klasse (Cross of Merit – First Class) in Germany, on 5 May 1989, for his work in Matabeleland. Weeger's archives are stored in Bulawayo.

== Sources ==
- Alexander, Jocelyn & Ranger, Terence Competition and Integration in the Religious History of North-Western Zimbabwe
- Journal of Religion in Africa, Vol. 28, Fasc. 1 (Feb., 1998), pp. 3–31
