= Apostolic Vicariate of Natal =

The Vicariate Apostolic of Natal (Latin: Vicariatus Apostolicus Natalensis) was a Latin Catholic missionary, quasi-diocesan jurisdiction in South Africa.

== Antecedents ==
The history of the Catholic Church in South Africa goes back to 1660, when a French bishop and a few priests were saved from the wreck of the Marichal near the Cape of Good Hope. They were only allowed to land, not to minister to the few Catholics who were already in Cape Town. Only in 1803 a Catholic priest was permitted to say Mass in the Cape Colony. Joannes Lansink, Jacobus Melissen and Lambertua Prinsen landed at Cape Town in 1803; the following year they were expelled.

Pope Pius VII, by letters Apostolic dated 8 June 1818, appointed Edward Bede Slater OSB the first Vicar Apostolic of the Cape of Good Hope and the neighbouring islands, Mauritius included. Slater on his way to Mauritius in 1820, left Patrick H. Scully at Cape Town in charge of the Catholics. In 1826 Theodore Wagner became resident priest. He was succeeded by E. Rishton in 1827.

On 6 June 1837, Gregory XVI established the Vicariate of the Cape of Good Hope, separate from Mauritius, and from that time Cape Colony had its own bishops.

== History ==
South Africa, comprising the country between Cape Agulhas and the tenth degree of south latitude and between the tenth and fortieth degrees of east longitude, was too much for one bishop. On 30 July 1847, Pius IX established a new vicariate in the eastern portion of Cape Colony. This new vicariate included first the eastern district of Cape Colony, Natal and the Orange Free State (Orange River Colony since the late South African war). The same pontiff on 15 November 1830 separated Natal and the Orange Free State from the Eastern Vicariate. The first bishop appointed by Rome to take charge of the Eastern Vicariate was Aidan Devereaux. He was consecrated bishop at Cape Town on 27 December 1847 by Griffith. When Pius IX erected the Vicariate of Natal, on 15 November 1830, the area of the new vicariate comprised all the portion of South Africa extending outside the then existing boundaries of Cape Colony.

The first vicar Apostolic, Marie-Jean-François Allard OMI, landed at Port Natal with five missionaries of the same French order. The name of this colony dates from Vasco da Gama, the Portuguese voyager, who sighted its headlands on Christmas Day, 1497, which suggested the name of Terra Natalis. In 1760 the Dutch had a trading settlement at the site of the present harbour of Durban, speedily abandoned; and more than a hundred years passed before Natal was again visited by Europeans.

After several wars between Dutch, British and native (relatively recent Bantu and ancient Khoisan) peoples, Natal was declared a British colony in 1843. Nine years later, Allard and his five companions landed on the African shores. 'Til that time, no priest had been residing in Natal. The country had been occasionally visited by a priest from Cape Colony. The first missionary who ministered to the Catholics of Natal was Thomas Murphy, sent by Devereaux. Its area was about 35,371 square miles (90,550 km²), bounded on the north by Transvaal Colony and Portuguese East Africa (now Mozambique); on the east by the Indian Ocean; on the south by Cape Colony (Pondoland); and on the west by Cape Colony (Griqualand East), Basutoland and Orange River Colony from which it is separated by the Drakensberg Mountains. At the advent of the first missionaries, the white element of the population was almost insignificant. Agriculture was practically unknown; industry, later a source of wealth, was altogether ignored.

The Catholic population was then composed of about two hundred in Durban and three hundred in Pietermaritzburg; it comprised only white immigrants, from England and especially from Ireland. The native population, scattered all over Natal, Zululand and the Transkei, which districts formed also a portion of the Vicariate of Natal, was considered altogether uncivilised. The agents of the London Missionary Society had organised some missionary work for the civilisation of natives, but they came out rather as officials of the Government, and therefore were not altogether ready to go through the hardships of missionary life. Besides the Europeans and natives, there was the scattered Dutch - Protestant 'Boer'- population.

The missionaries found poor success in converting either the natives or the Dutch. The native belief system and polygamous customs conflicted with Catholicism, and the Dutch had an existing dislike for the religion, such that for seven years the missionaries failed to make any converts. Eventually Allard founded a new mission exclusively for the natives, to whom the missionaries wished to devote themselves altogether, and called that new mission St. Michael. Here they were destined to battle against many obstacles, privation of the necessaries of life, difficulty of communication and poverty, which drove the missionaries to the verge of starvation.

The advent of new missionaries enabled Allard to found missions as far as Basutoland. Religious increase was slow, owing to the small number of missionaries and the degradation of the population. Communication was extremely slow and difficult, generally either by wagons drawn by oxen or on horseback; during the rainy season travel was very dangerous, owing to the swollen rivers. Amid such hardships and privations Allard felt that his life was drawing to a close. He retired to Rome, where he died soon after.

Under his successor, Charles Jolivet Missionary Oblates of Mary Immaculate, appointed 30 November 1874, the Vicariate of Natal made rapid progress in the way of Christianity and civilisation. New missions were founded all over this immense vicariate, and new chapels and schools for Europeans and natives were opened. Many obstacles which had hindered the missionary work badly were removed. Communication became easier, owing to the new railways and roads laid out across the country by the colonial Government of Natal. Missionary work has been of late years carried on amongst the natives on a very large scale, owing to the advent of some Trappists into the Colony of Natal, who afterwards were organised into the Congregation of the Missionaries of Mariannhill. They devoted themselves entirely to the evangelisation of the natives, and as statistics show, their efforts and labours were fully rewarded. The late Anglo-Boer war hampered much the missionary work in this vicariate, but the consequences of this war practically disappeared. Through the treaty agreed to by the British and the Boers, the Districts of Utrecht, Vryheid and Wakkerstroom were ceded to Natal and have been added to this vicariate, which since comprised the three above-mentioned districts, Natal proper, Transkei, Swaziland and Zululand.

Henri Delalle Missionary Oblates of Mary Immaculate was appointed bishop in 1904.

The white population of the vicariate was estimated in 1910 to be about 100,000; natives, Indians and Malays, 1,000,000. The Catholic population was 25,737 (whites, 7458; natives, 15,227; coloured, 3052). Priests: Oblates of Mary Immaculate, 38; Missionaries of Mariannhill, 46; secular priests: Europeans, 4, natives, 3. There was a seminary, with eleven theological students. Lay brothers: Oblates of Mary Immaculate, Europeans, 4, native, 1; Missionaries of Mariannhill, 305; Marist Brothers, 7. Number of churches, 59; missions, 49. Number of schools: for whites, 24, pupils, 653; for natives, 62, pupils, 1864; for coloured, 10, pupils, 472; most schools were conducted by nuns. Orders of women: Sisters of the Precious Blood, 324; Sisters of the Holy Cross, 55; Sisters of Nazareth, 12; Sisters of the Holy Family, 92; Dominicans, 138; Augustinians, 67; Franciscans, 12; Sisters of Kermaria, 18. Two schools for whites, 4 sanatoria for whites and natives, and an orphanage for coloured children under the management of the Augustinian Sisters; and a house for orphans and aged under the care of the Sisters of Nazareth House, with about 260 inmates. At the Bluff the Sisters of the Holy Family had an orphanage for European children; they had a novitiate at Bellair, with 10 novices. Two Congregations of Dominican Sisters were in Natal: one had their mother-house at Oakford and ran schools at Noodsberg and Genezzano. The other had been founded in Newcastle, and established Convents with schools in Newcastle, Dundee, Lennoxton as well as in the Transvaal. At Ladysmith and Pietermaritzburg were two hospitals, and two sanatoria of the Augustinian Sisters. Besides numerous boarding-schools in different parts of the vicariate, there were many parochial schools, some under the control of the colonial Government, receiving a subsidy proportioned to the number of pupils.

On 27 August 1921, part of its territory was split off and established as Apostolic Prefecture of Zululand, later to become the Diocese of Eshowe; on 10 September 1921 another part was established as Apostolic Vicariate of Mariannhill, later further split. On 11 January 1951 the remaining territory was promoted as Metropolitan Archdiocese of Durban, with presently six suffragan dioceses: Dundee (Natal), Eshowe, Kokstad, Mariannhill, Umtata and Umzimkulu.

In 1921 the Diocese of Manzini was split off, making Swaziland no longer under the jurisdiction of this diocese.

== Sources and references ==
- GigaCatholic- Durban archbishopric
