= Elias Kwenzakufani Zondi =

South African Catholic prelate (born 1963)

The Most Reverend Elias Kwenzakufani Zondi
- Auxiliary Bishop of Durban, South Africa
- Church: Catholic Church
- Archdiocese: Roman Catholic Archdiocese of Durban
- See: Durban
- Appointed: 9 March 2023
- Installed: 27 May 2023

Orders
- Ordination: 16 July 1994
- Consecration: 27 May 2023 by Siegfried Mandla Jwara
- Rank: Bishop

Personal details
- Born: Elias Kwenzakufani Zondi; 24 December 1963 (age 62) Magoebaskloof, Diocese of Tzaneen, Limpopo, South Africa

Styles of Elias Kwenzakufani Zondi
- Reference style: Your Lordship; The Most Reverend
- Spoken style: His Lordship
- Religious style: Bishop

Elias Kwenzakufani Zondi (born 24 December 1963) is a South African Catholic prelate who was appointed auxiliary bishop of the Roman Catholic Archdiocese of Durban, in South Africa on 9 March 2023 by Pope Francis. He was contemporaneously assigned as Titular Bishop of Rutabo. Before that, from 16 July 1994 until 9 March 2023, he was a priest of the same Roman Catholic Archdiocese. He was consecrated and installed at Durban on 27 May 2023 by Siegfried Mandla Jwara, Archbishop of Durban.

== Background and education ==
Elias Kwenzakufani Zondi was born on 24 December 1963 in Magoebaskloof, Diocese of Tzaneen, Limpopo, South Africa. He studied at the Saint Paul Preparatory Seminary in Hammanskraal, Gauteng. He then studied at the Saint Peter Philosophical Seminary of Garsfontein, Gauteng, where he studied philosophy. From there he transferred to the Saint John Vianney Major Seminary in Pretoria, where he studied theology and earned a bachelor’s degree.

== Priest ==
He was ordained a priest for the Catholic Archdiocese of Durban on 16 July 1994. He served as a priest until 9 March 2023. While a priest, he served in various roles and locations, including:

- Parish vicar of Christ the King Parish in Wentworth, KwaZulu-Natal from 1994 until 1995.
- Parish priest of Saint James Parish in Mooi River from 1996 until 2000.
- Parish priest of KwaKristo Umsindisi Parish from 2001 until 2015.
- Parish priest of Lady of Lourdes Parish from 2001 until 2015.
- Parish priest of Saint James Parish in Lamontville from 2016 until 2023.
- Vicar General of Ecclesiastical Metropolitan Province of Durban from 2021 until 2023.

== Bishop ==
On 9 March 2023, Pope Francis appointed as Auxiliary Bishop of Durban, the Reverend Father Monsignor Elias Kwenzakufani Zondi, previously a member of the clergy of the Catholic Archdiocese of Durban and Vicar General of that Ecclesiastical Metropolitan Province. He was contemporaneously assigned Titular Bishop of Rutabo. He was consecrated in Durban on 27 May 2023 by the hands of Siegfried Mandla Jwara, Archbishop of Durban assisted by Thomas Graham Rose, Bishop of Dundee and Sylvester Anthony John David, Titular Bishop of Gunugus.

== See also ==
- Catholic Church in South Africa

== Succession table ==
Catholic Church titles
Preceded by	Auxiliary Bishop of Durban (since 9 March 2023)	Succeeded by
