= Thomas Spreiter =

Thomas Spreiter OSB
- Vicar Apostolic of Eshowe
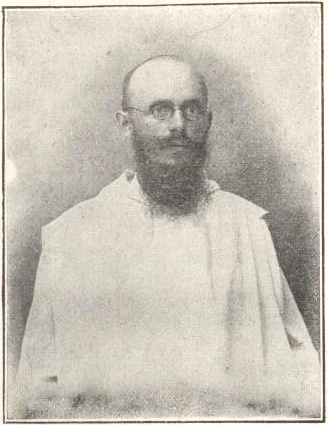
- Spreiter in 1900
- Church: Catholic Church
- See: Apostolic Vicariate of Eshowe
- In office: 29 August 1921 – 14 May 1943
- Predecessor: Prefecture erected
- Successor: Aurelian Bilgeri
- Other post: Titular Bishop of Thenae (1906-1944)
- Previous posts: Vicar Apostolic of Dar-es-Salaam (1906-1921); Vicar Apostolic of Southern Zanguebar (1906)

Orders
- Ordination: 25 July 1897
- Consecration: 1 May 1906 by Maximilian von Lingg

Personal details
- Born: 28 December 1865 Regensburg, Kingdom of Bavaria, German Confederation
- Died: 27 January 1944 (aged 78) Inkamana, Vryheid, Natal, Union of South Africa, British Empire
- Buried: Sacred Heart Abbey, Inkamana

Thomas (Franz Xavier) Spreiter, OSB (28 December 1865 – 27 January 1944) was a German missionary, one of the first of the Missionary Benedictines, who worked in German East Africa and later South Africa. He was the ordinary of the Roman Catholic Archdiocese of Dar-es-Salaam in German East Africa, and bishop of the Apostolic Vicariate of Natal and of the Vicariate of Eshowe.

== Biography ==
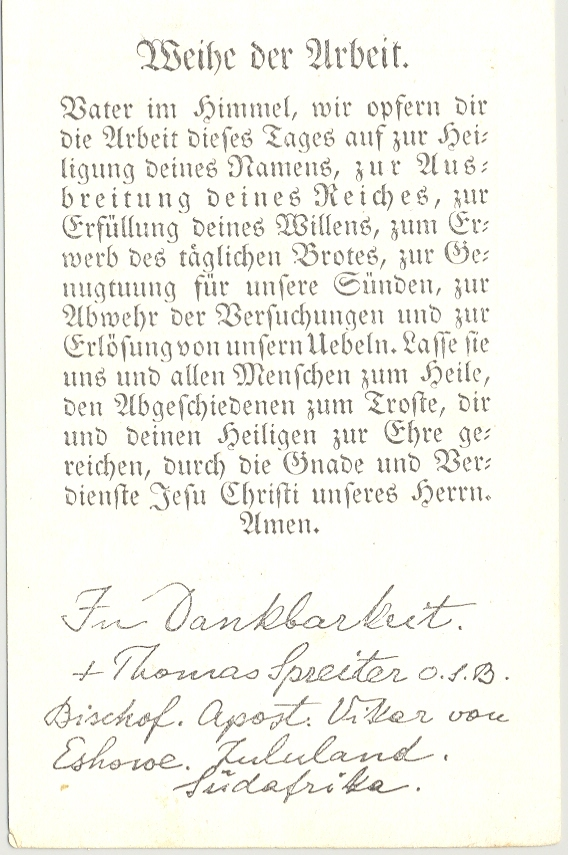
Back of prayer card signed by Thomas Spreiter

=== Childhood, early education ===
Thomas Spreiter was born to a deeply religious Catholic middle-class family. From an early age, he had shown an interest in missionary work, but during the Kulturkampf no orders could engage in missionary activities. However, Benedictine visionary Andreas Amrhein had just begun his Ottilien Congregation and had opened up an institute in Reichenbach, not far from Regensburg. Spreiter began his novitiate there on 29 September 1886. The institute was housed in a former Benedictine monastery, and the first years, poverty reigned and the work was hard; additionally, Spreiter had become Amrhein's personal secretary. In 1887, the order transferred its activities to St. Ottilien Archabbey. There, he professed on 2 February 1888, and was ordained on 28 July 1897.

=== First mission ===
In 1900, he left for the mission in Zanzibar, where the Benedictines of St. Ottilien Archabbey had been active after 1888. He headed the mission there in 1905, until the Maji Maji Rebellion, during which Bishop Cassian and four other bishops were killed, threatened his mission and his life; they fled, and Spreiter went to Europe to learn of his future as a missionary.

=== Second mission ===
Spreiter, on his return to Europe, learned that he was appointed as apostolic vicar on 13 March 1906, succeeding Bishop Spiss. He was ordained in St. Ottilien on 1 May, and returned to Africa in 1906, now overseeing all missionary and educational activities in his vicariate: "Every year he undertook a pastoral journey through his mission territory. That meant he was on the road for up to six months and covered a distance of around 1500 kilometers on foot."

When World War I broke out, all German missionary activities were forcibly halted, and Spreiter was under house arrest in Dar es Salaam until 1920, when he was made to return to Germany, "resigning" his post in Zanzibar on 24 November 1920.

=== Third mission ===
On 27 August 1921 he was appointed bishop (1st Apostolic Prefect) to the Apostolic Vicariate of Natal (Zululand). In 1922, with the help of other German missionaries, he founded the Inkamana Abbey, also known as Sacred Heart Abbey, Inkamana. Three years later, on 26 January 1924, he was nominated 1st Apostolic Vicar of the newly promoted Vicariate of Eshowe, which had split off from the Apostolic Vicariate of Natal in 1921. He was described as "rigid and uncompromising." He retired on 14 May 1943, and died in Sacred Heart Abbey, on 27 January 1944, where he is buried.

== Dinosaur bones ==
During Spreiter's tenure in Zanzibar, Werner Janensch and Edwin Hennig were conducting their expedition to the Tendaguru Formation. On 30 May 1910, Spreiter visited their camp, where Hennig met him. Spreiter showed him a bone fragment he had picked up in a village near the Mbalawala Plateau, and another fragment he had found in a village called Makangaga, west of Kilwa Kivinje, which proved that dinosaur bones could be found hundreds of miles from Tendaguru, the initial aim of their expedition.
