= Dutch Reformed Church, Vryheid =

Church in Vryheid, South Africa

Dutch Reformed Church
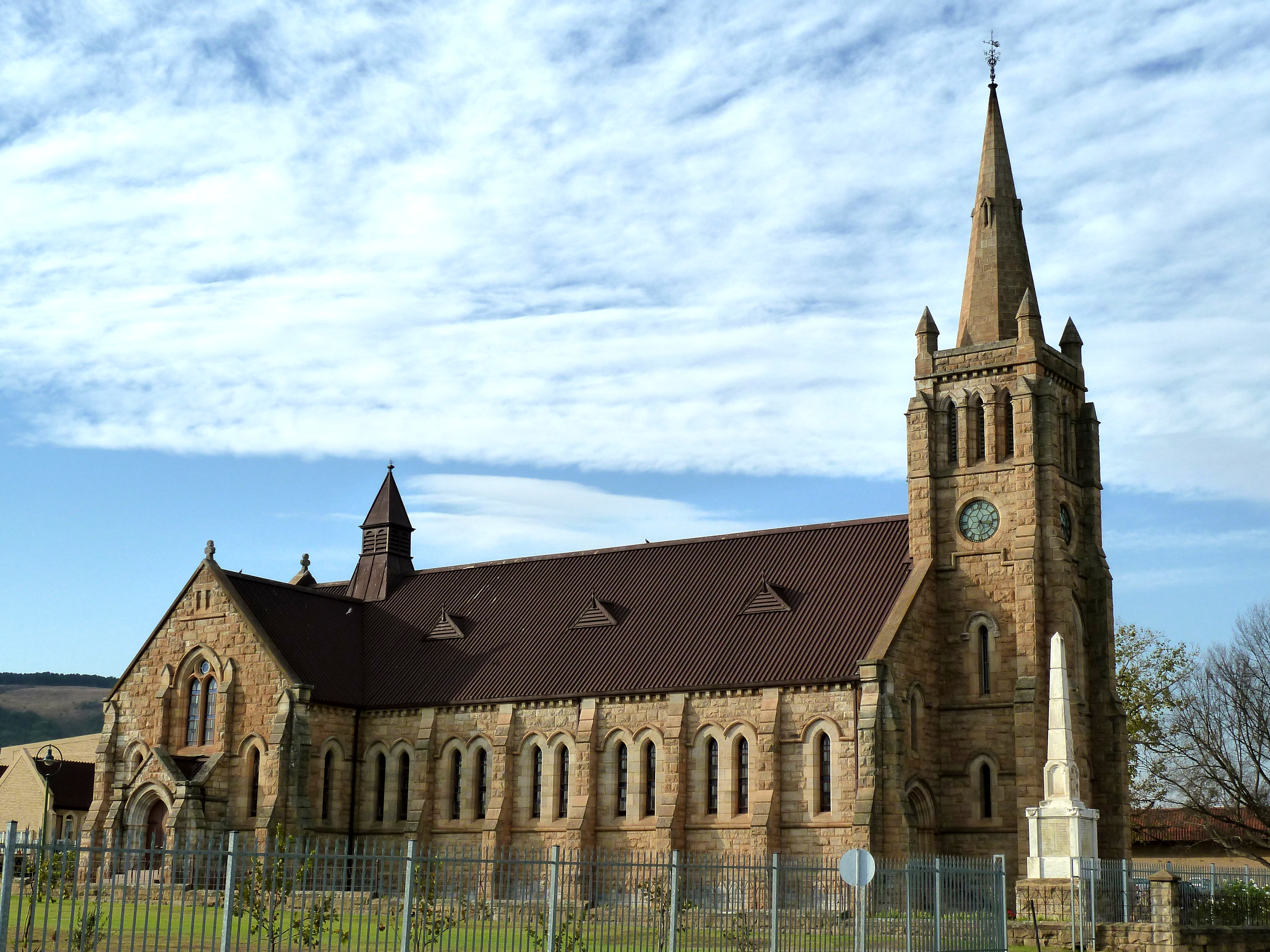
- Dutch Reformed Church
- 27°46′03″S 30°47′31″E
- Location: Vryheid
- Country: South Africa
- Denomination: Nederduits Gereformeerde Kerk

History
- Founded: 1886

Architecture
- Functional status: Church

The Dutch Reformed Church in Vryheid is the mother congregation of the Dutch Reformed Church in the KwaZulu-Natal town of Vryheid. It is a rural congregation and a large part of the farming community around Vryheid is involved here.

== Ministers ==
- Adriaan Jacobus Louw, 1888–1893
- Guillaume Francois Marais, 1893–1898
- Edwin Cheere Anderssen, 1899–1921 (toe hy die eerste keer sy emeritaat aanvaar)
- Christoffel Jacobus Snyman, 1922–1928 (aanvaar sy emeritaat; oorlede op 14 Oktober 1937)
- Francois Johannes van der Merwe, 1928–1945 (toe hy die eerste keer sy emeritaat aanvaar)
- André Francois Malan, 1944–1946
- George Johannes Viljoen Bell, 1946–1951
- Josua Petrus Theron, 1947–1951
- Marthinus Muller van Rooyen, 1948–1950
- Ernst Hendrik Latsky, 1951–1959
- Willem Jacobus Gerhardus Lubbe, 1960–1962 (waarna Vryheid-Oos tot 1967)
- Johannes Theodoris Jordaan, 30 Januarie 1965–1974 (oorlede op 28 Junie 2019 in die ouderdom van 92 jaar en amper ses maande)
- Hennie van Schalkwyk, ? – 27 September 2020 (laaste erediens gelei)
