= Rolf Stumpf =

South African statistician (1945–2020)

- Born: Rolf Heinrich Stumpf; 6 November 1945; Vryheid, KwaZulu-Natal, South Africa
- Died: 27 October 2020 (aged 74)
- Education: University of Pretoria; Unisa
- Occupations: Statistician and former Vice Chancellor and Rector of the Nelson Mandela Metropolitan University

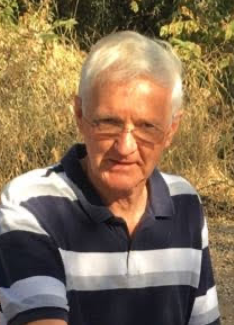
Rolf Stumpf in 2020

Rolf Heinrich Stumpf (6 November 1945 – 27 October 2020) was a South African statistician who served as Vice Chancellor and Rector of the Nelson Mandela Metropolitan University in Port Elizabeth. He was a member of the Academy of Science of South Africa and served on the Council of the University of South Africa.

== Biography ==
Stumpf was born on 6 November 1945 in Vryheid, KwaZulu-Natal.

Stumpf's career spanned various positions in academia, the research environment, and in the higher education policy environment, including serving as Deputy Director General of the Department of National Education and President of the Human Sciences Research Council.

Prior to his appointment as Vice Chancellor and Rector of the Nelson Mandela Metropolitan University he was Vice-Rector (Teaching) at the University of Stellenbosch until 2002.

Stumpf served as a member of the Council on Higher Education, Chair of the Higher Education Quality Committee, and as a trustee of the Centre for Higher Education Transformation.

== Education ==
Stumpf studied Mathematics and Statistics at the University of Pretoria, and graduated in 1972 with a Master of Arts cum laude. In 1974, he graduated with a diploma in Theology at the Baptist College in Johannesburg. In 1982, he was awarded a Ph.D. in Statistics (Analysis of Qualitative Data) from the University of South Africa.

== Publications ==
The author of a number of scientific articles in the field of statistics, Stumpf served as the co-author of a book on Graphical Exploratory Data Analysis. He also authored and co-authored a large number of policy reports in the field of higher education and in vocational education.

== Death ==
Stumpf died on the morning of Tuesday 27 October 2020. He was 74. He leaves behind a wife and three children.
