= Keegan Longueira =

South African adventurer, motivational speaker and author

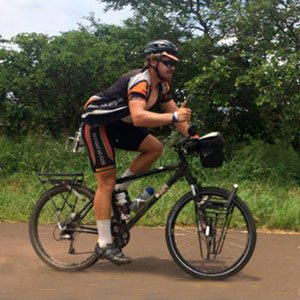
- Born: 1 April 1991 (age 35); Vryheid, South Africa
- Occupations: Adventurer, motivational speaker, and author.
- Known for: Guinness World Record; Fastest solo bicycle expedition across Africa from Cairo to Cape Town; Operation Smile ambassador

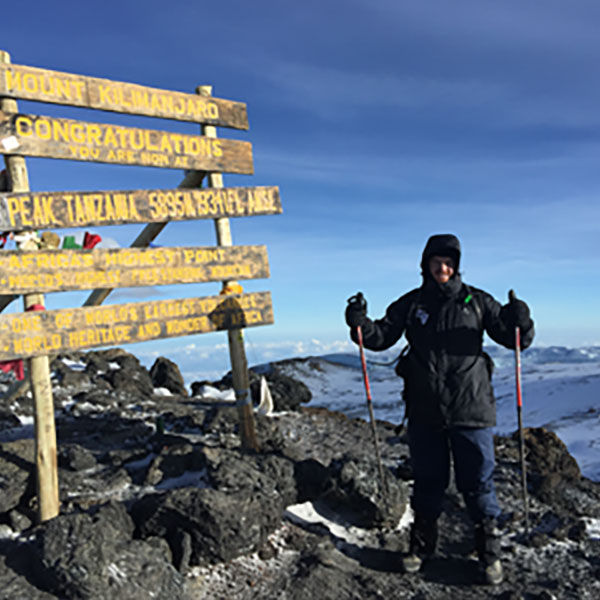
Keegan Longueira at Kilimanjaro summit

Keegan Longueira (born 1 April 1991) is a South African adventurer, motivational speaker, and author. He currently resides in Witbank (eMalahleni) a coal mining town in the Province of Mpumalanga in South Africa. Longueira rose to prominence in 2015 after completing a solo bicycle expedition across Africa from Cairo to Cape Town. On 2 March 2015, he arrived at the V&A Waterfront in Cape Town in a time of 59 days, 8 hours and 30 minutes, and became the Guinness Record holder for the fastest man ever to cross the continent on Bicycle. Keegan for 4 years had done major expeditions within South Africa as training and build up to the World Record Attempt. He now speaks to churches, businesses and major companies about his expeditions and his lessons learnt on the road. Longueira uses his story to influence and touch lives and inspire people to live their dream, regardless of how far away it may seem when starting.

== Biography ==
Keegan Longueira was born in Vryheid in Kwa-Zulu Natal South Africa. His dad was a coal miner and his mom a school teacher. The family moved to Standerton soon after his birth and he grew up there. Keegan has always been a keen sportsman and played rugby, cricket, tennis, football and also competed in karate, swimming and wrestling. At the age of 6 his family moved to Witbank where he attended St Thomas Aquinas school. He excelled in sports and made provincial sides for hockey and swimming while acquiring a love for creative writing. At age 15 he went to St Benedict's College Boarding School in Johannesburg. Keegan worked at a small triathlon shop before deciding to attend the University of Johannesburg to study a BSc in Sports Science. He dropped out before April and then for a short while tried his hand at being a teacher. Before the end of the year he left on a mission trip to Zambia which had a life changing effect on him. Keegan then left for Brazil November 2010 where he volunteered in an orphanage for 3 weeks. In January 2011 he tried his hand at studying again (BCom in Marketing Management) at the University of Pretoria. Keegan promised to see the year out but his belief in wanting his life to represent something bigger led him to de-register from University, buy a second hand bicycle and embark on an expedition across South Africa.

== Expeditions ==
Kilimanjaro 2017

In 2017, the night of completing his first ever CrossFit Open, a worldwide 5 week online competition, Keegan and his dad board a plane for Kilimanjaro National Airport in Tanzania. The Father and son team set out to conquer Africa's highest peak after speaking about it for many years. The trip was arranged and done through Kibo Slopes Safaris who Keegan had got in contact with doing his "Cairo to Cape Town" bicycle expedition. On March 30 after a grueling, through the night hike through ice and snow, Manuel Longueira (Keegan's Dad) had to make the tough decision to turn back for base camp after suffering from altitude sickness. Keegan pressed on with one other Guide and managed to summit at approximately 8:30am. It was Keegan's first ever mountain expedition which definitely had an influence on fueling future expeditions.

Morocco to Norway

On March 12, 2016 Keegan left on his second major expedition in order to raise money for charity. His goal was to cycle from Casablanca Morocco Africa to Norway. The journey saw ride his bicycle solo across Morocco, Spain, France, Belgium, Netherlands, Germany, Denmark, Sweden and eventually end the trip in Oslo Norway. It took him 3 months to complete the trip which saw him take many days off to speak to people about the journey and the charity he was raising money for. They Charity Forgotten Continent was a Non Profit organization started by Keegan and a team of directors to raise money and awareness for sport out reach project to conduct in Africa. Keegan was quoted as saying he would be back to complete work on the Africa Cairo to Cape town route after the poverty prompted him to start the Organisation.

Witbank to Cape Town

The title of his first expedition (The Cape Trek Project) eventually become the name of his company, The Cape Trek Project (Pty) Ltd. Keegan's first bicycle expedition across South Africa stretched from Witbank to Cape Town. Keegan used this trip to raise money for CANSA first and then Operation Smile. He completed the first trip in 22 Days, the second in 10 days and the third in 14.

Witbank to Ballito

His fourth expedition was done in aid of Cancer once again but was done with one of his good friends, Brent den Bakker The two cycled towards the sea to meet up with a primary school hockey team, The Travelling Pinks, who would be playing three matches to raise money for charity. Keegan was the coach of the team at that time.

Cairo to Cape Town. Guinness World Record.

His fifth and biggest expedition took place in 2015. He flew to Cairo from South Africa on 31 January 2014 and rolled out of the Cairo el Borg on 2 January 2015 to cycle to Cape Town as fast as he could. He was chasing Robert Knoll's World Record of 70 days. ! The early journey was plagued by injury and skin infections and by the time he reached Wadi Halfa (Sudan) many thought the record opportunity had past. 4 Days behind record pace, Keegan cut out planned rest days to catch up on time lost. He crossed Sudan, Ethiopia, Kenya, Tanzania, Zambia and Botswana before eventually arriving back in South Africa. En-route Keegan suffered from diarrhoea, severe sun burn, cramps and dehydration, survived a near robbery at knife point (twice), was spat on in Ethiopia and hit with rocks thrown by kids. Despite this, Keegan eventually reached Cape Town on 2 March 2015 to become the fastest man across the African Continent.

Expeditions	Year	Route	Time	Charities Benefited
The Cape Trek Project	2011	Witbank-Cape Town	22 days	CANSA and Operation Smile
The Cape Trek Project	2011	Witbank-Cape Town	10 days	CANSA and Operation Smile
The Cape Trek Project	2011	Witbank-Cape Town	14 days	CANSA
The Cape Trek Project	2014	Ballito-Cape Town	14 days	CANSA
The Cape Trek Project	2015	Cairo-Cape Town	59:08:30	Operation Smile

== Operation Smile ==
Keegan began working with Operation Smile in 2013 after learning about the challenges faced by children who need cleft lip and palate surgeries. Since then, Keegan and The Cape Trek Project have raised funds for the organization to support surgeries. Keegan has stated a commitment to helping others with these conditions.
