= Andrew Zolile T. Brook =

Andrew Zolile T. Brook (22 November 1929 – 5 September 2011) was the Catholic bishop of the Diocese of Umtata, South Africa. Ordained to the priesthood in 1957, Brook was appointed bishop of the Umtala Diocese in 1979 and resigned in 1995.
