= Diocese of Mthatha =

Diocese of Umtata or Diocese of Mthatha may refer to the following ecclesiastical jurisdictions with episcopal see in Mthatha, (Eastern) Cape province, South Africa:

- Catholic Diocese of Mthatha (alias Umtata)
- Anglican Diocese of Mthatha
