= Arberg =

- Municipality
- Coat of arms

- Location of Arberg within Ansbach district
- Interactive map of Arberg
- Location within Germany Location within Bavaria
- Coordinates: 49°8′N 10°37′E
- Country: Germany
- State: Bavaria
- Admin. region: Mittelfranken
- District: Ansbach
- Subdivisions: 12 Ortsteile

Government
  - Mayor (2020–26): Hans-Jürgen Nägelein

Area
  - Total: 31.31 km^{2} (12.09 sq mi)
- Elevation: 468 m (1,535 ft)

Population (2025-12-31)
  - Total: 2,215
  - Density: 70.74/km^{2} (183.2/sq mi)
- Time zone: UTC+01:00 (CET)
  - Summer (DST): UTC+02:00 (CEST)
- Postal codes: 91722
- Dialling codes: 09822
- Vehicle registration: AN
- Website: www.arberg.de

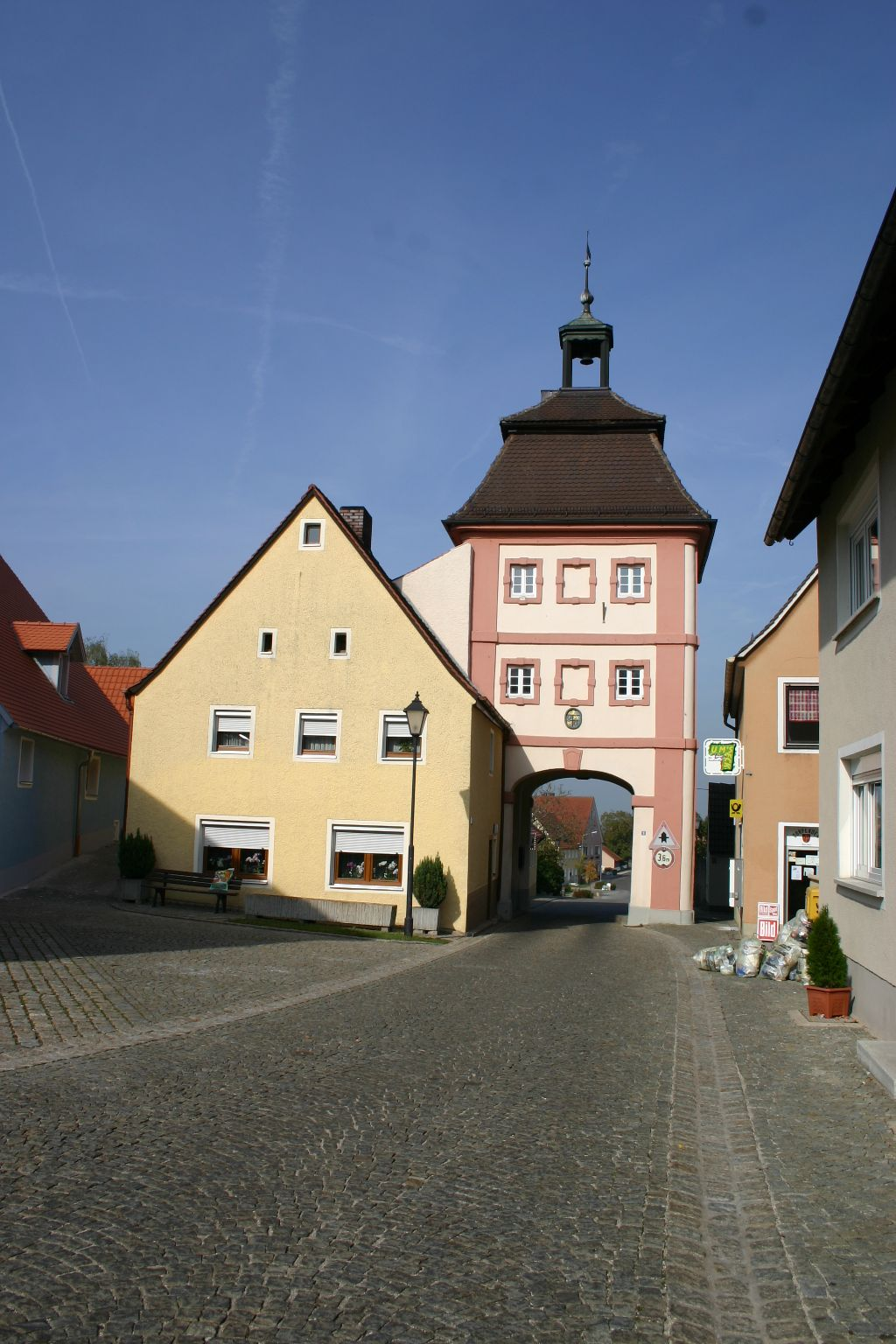
Gatehouse in Arberg.

Arberg is a municipality in the district of Ansbach in Bavaria in Germany.

== See also ==
- Odilo Weeger
