= Archdiocese of Durban =

Latin Catholic archdiocese in South Africa

Coordinates: 29.8833°S 31.0500°E

Archdiocese of Durban Archidioecesis Durbaniana

Location
- Country: South Africa
- Headquarters: Durban, KwaZulu-Natal, South Africa

Statistics
- Area: 20,300 km^{2} (7,800 sq mi)
- Population: Total; Catholics: (as of 2023); 3,199,329; 124,000 (3.9%)
- Parishes: 76

Information
- Denomination: Catholic Church
- Sui iuris church: Latin Church
- Rite: Roman Rite
- Established: 15 November 1850; 175 years ago
- Cathedral: Emmanuel Cathedral
- Secular priests: 131

Current leadership
- Pope: Leo XIV
- Metropolitan Archbishop: Siegfried Jwara, C.M.M.
- Auxiliary Bishops: Elias Kwenzakufani Zondi
- Bishops emeritus: Wilfrid Napier, O.F.M.

The Archdiocese of Durban evolved from the Vicariate Apostolic of Natal which was erected on 15 November 1850 and elevated to an archdiocese with the title Archdiocese of Durban on 11 January 1951. As of 2002, the Church census shows that there were 217,468 Catholics in 74 parishes in the archdiocese.

The Metropolitan Province of Durban contains these suffragan dioceses:

- Dundee
- Eshowe
- Kokstad
- Marianhill
- Umtata
- Umzimkulu

== Leadership ==
Apostolic Vicars of Natal

- Bishop Marie Jean Francois Allard, O.M.I. (31 January 1851 – 11 June 1874), resigned
- Bishop Charles-Constant Jolivet, O.M.I. (15 September 1874 – 15 September 1903)
- Bishop Henri Delalle, O.M.I. (19 December 1903 – 4 April 1946), reitred
- Bishop Denis Hurley, O.M.I. (12 December 1946 – 11 January 1951)

Archbishops of Durban

- Archbishop Denis Hurley, O.M.I. (11 January 1951 – 29 May 1992), retired
- Archbishop Wilfrid Napier, O.F.M. (29 March 1992 – 9 June 2021), retired
  - Apostolic Administrator Wilfrid Napier, O.F.M. (9 June 2021 – 8 August 2021)
  - Coadjutor Archbishop Abel Gabuza (9 December 2018 – 17 January 2021)
- Archbishop Siegfried Jwara, C.M.M. (9 June 2021 – Present)

Auxiliary Bishops

- Dominic Joseph Chwane Khumalo, O.M.I. (1978-1999)
- Jabulani Adatus Nxumalo, O.M.I. (2002-2005), appointed Archbishop of Bloemfontein
- Barry Alexander Anthony Wood, O.M.I. (2005-2017)
- Monsignor Elias Kwenzakufani Zondi - Auxiliary Bishop since March 2023
