= Nový Dvůr Monastery =

Coordinates: 49°59′5″N 12°59′4″E

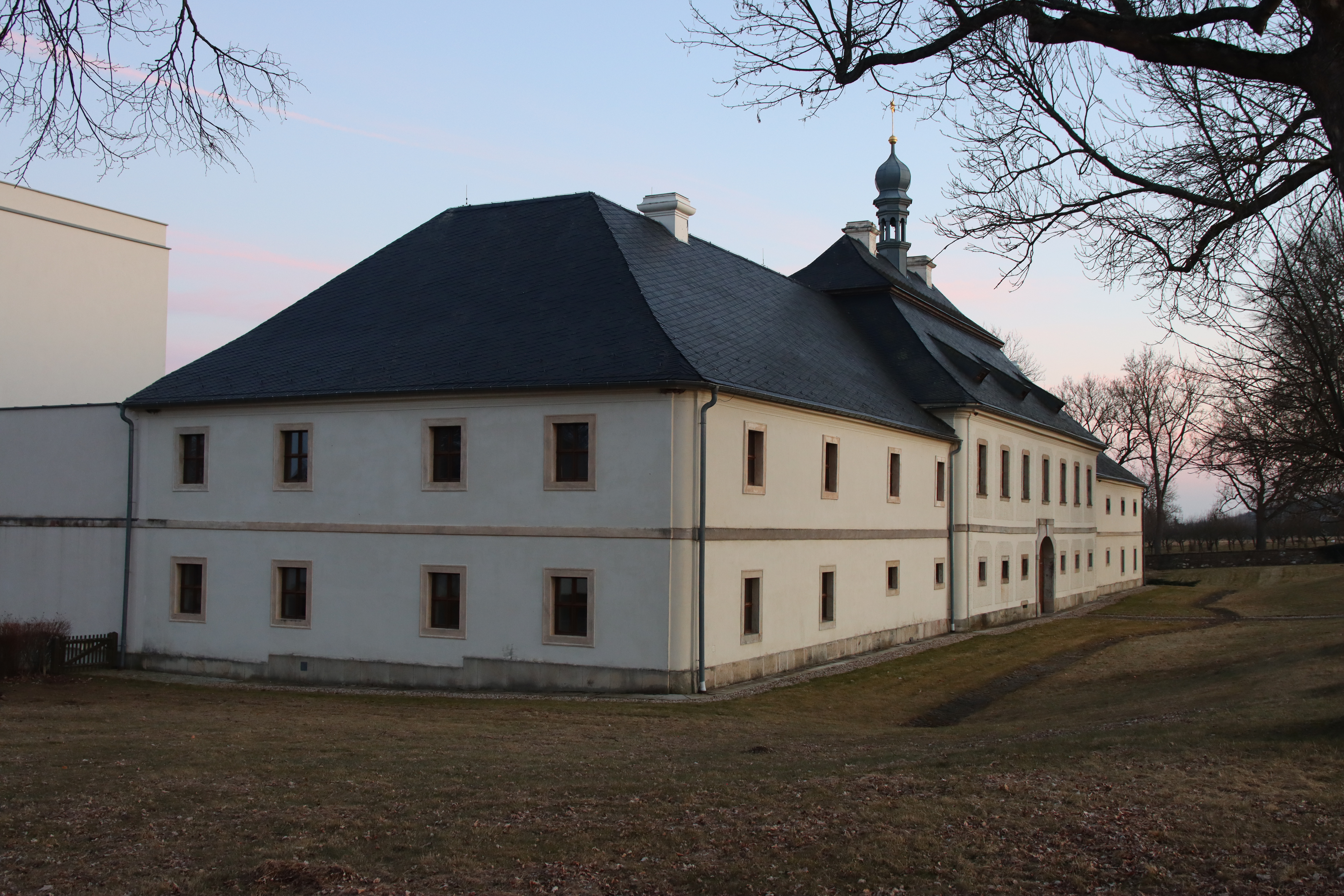
Nový Dvůr Monastery

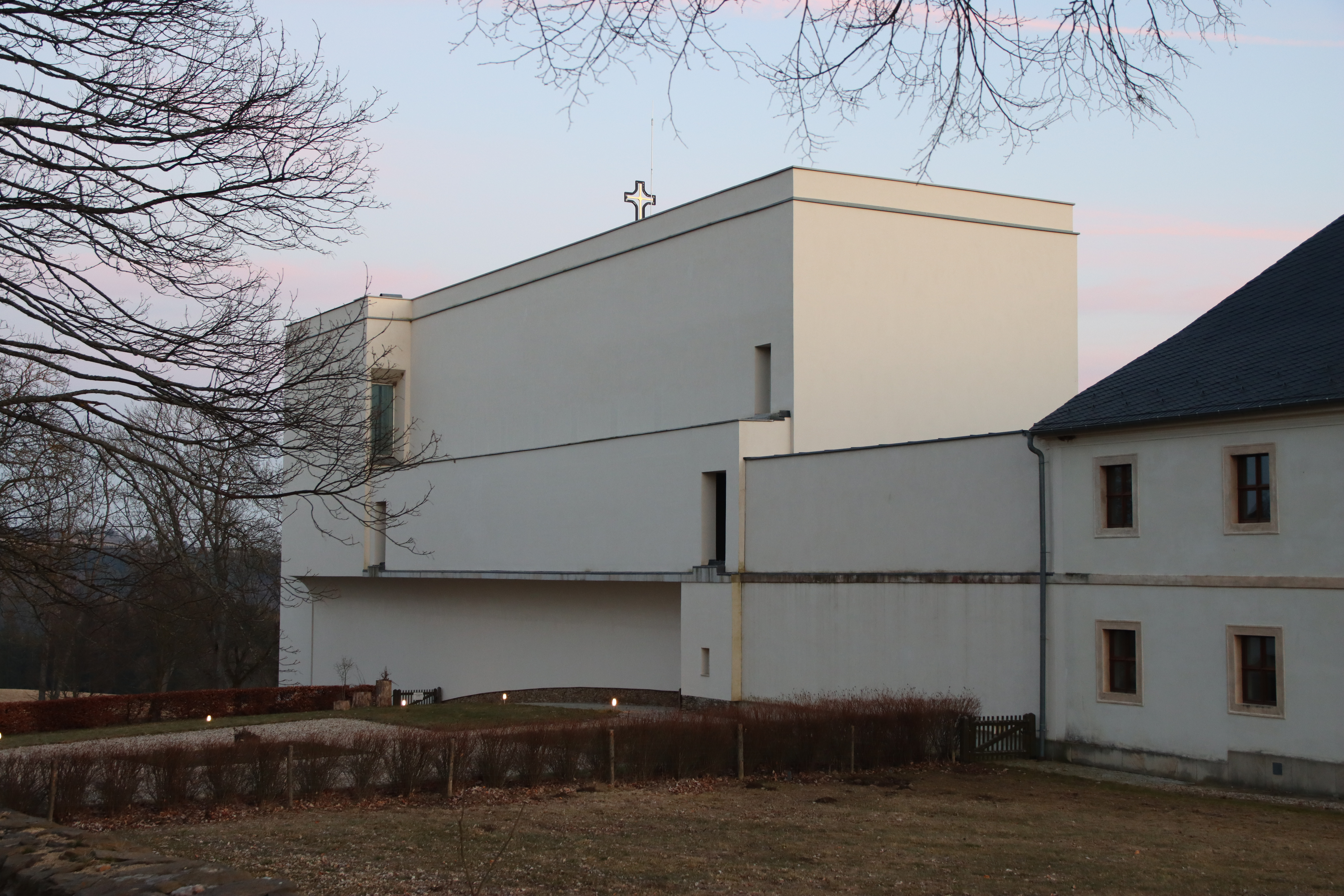
The Abbey church

The Nový Dvůr Monastery (full name Monastery of the Mother of God Nový Dvůr; Czech: Klášter Matky Boží Nový Dvůr) is the only men's monastery of the Trappist Order in the Czech Republic. It is located in Dobrá Voda part of Toužim in the Karlovy Vary Region, close to the Premonstratensian monastery of Teplá.

== Description ==
The Monastery of the Mother of God Nový Dvůr is a monastery of the Trappist Order originated from a dilapidated Baroque manor house (Nový Dvůr means literally "the New Yard"), that was partially reconstructed and mostly replaced by a modern construction according to a project of British architectural designer John Pawson. It was established in August 2002 as a daughter house of the Sept-Fons Abbey, France. In September 2004 the monastery church was dedicated to Our Lady.

As of 2009, the monastery is home to about twenty monks, who manufacture several products: face cream "Crème Réparatrice" with an extract of corn sprouts, linden and orange tree with ECOCERT certification; four sorts of mustard (two are produced via organic farming), which, in addition to the Czech Republic, are also sold in France, Germany, Austria and Hungary. The recipes of both products were created by monks at Nový Dvůr, and the other products of Nový Dvůr such as jam, coffee and dietary supplements originate from their home monastery, Sept-Fons Abbey in France.
