= Mariastern Abbey, Banja Luka =

Mariastern Abbey
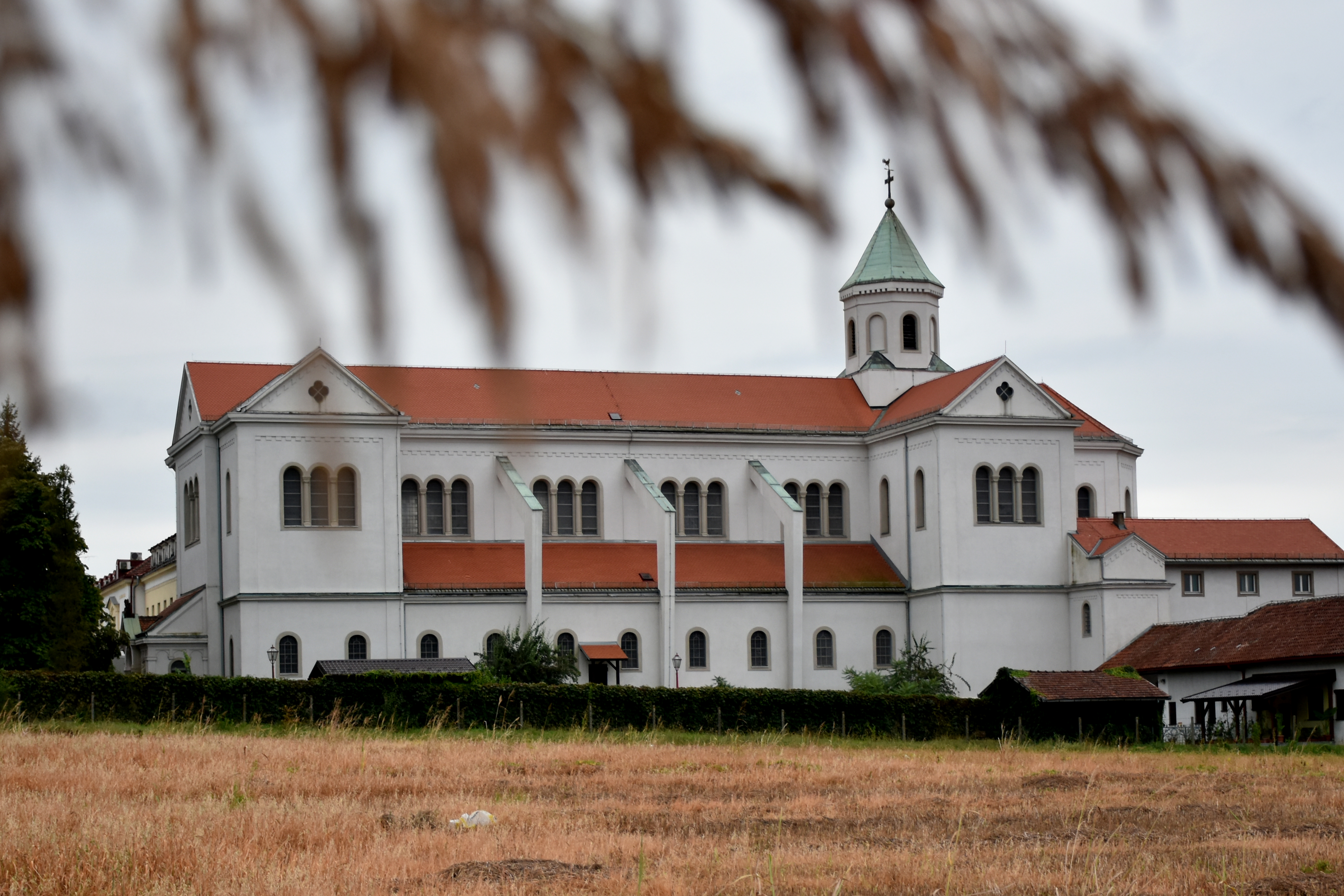
- Interactive map of Mariastern Abbey

Monastery information
- Other name: Opatija Marija Zvijezda
- Order: Cistercians of the Strict Observance
- Established: 1869
- Diocese: Banja Luka
- Controlled churches: Church of the Assumption of the Blessed Virgin Mary

People
- Founder: Franz Pfanner

Site
- Location: Banja Luka, Bosnia and Herzegovina
- Coordinates: 44°48′24″N 17°13′29″E
- Other information

KONS of Bosnia and Herzegovina
- Official name: Church of the Mariastern Trappist Monastery (Church of the Dormition of the Blessed Virgin Mary) with movable property in Banja Luka (historic monument)
- Type: cultural and historical as well as natural heritage
- Criteria: A, B, C i.ii.iii.iv.v.vi., D i.ii.iii.iv.v., E i.ii.iii.iv.v., F i.ii.iii., G i.ii.iii.iv.v.vi.vii., H i.iiii., I i.ii.iii.iv.
- Designated: 7 May 2004
- Reference no.: 06/1-2-1007/03-7
- List of National Monuments of Bosnia and Herzegovina

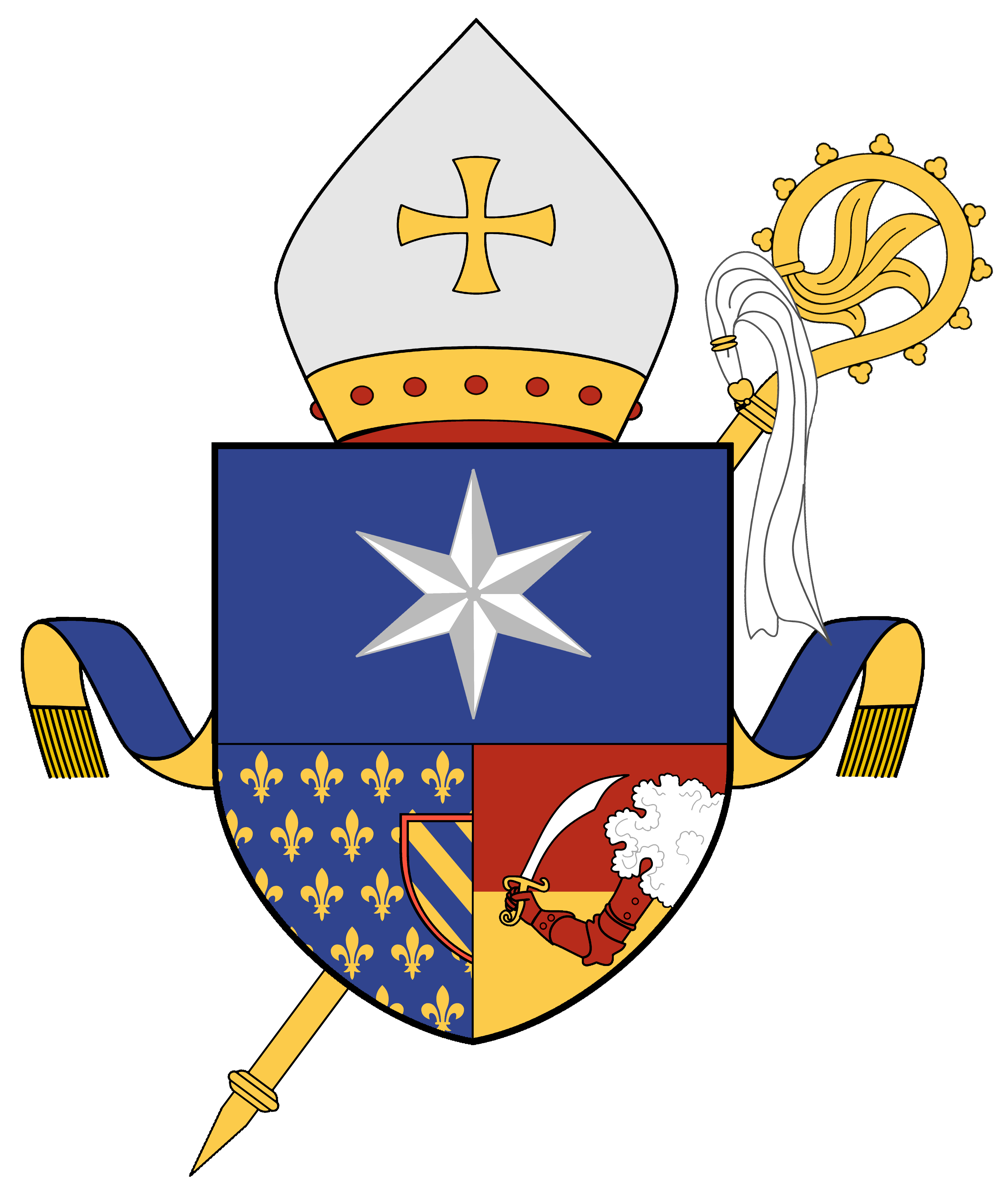
Coat of Arms of Mariastern Abbey

Mariastern Abbey (Croatian: Opatija Marija Zvijezda) is a Trappist abbey in Bosnia and Herzegovina, situated near the country's second largest city Banja Luka. It consists of the Church of the Assumption of the Blessed Virgin Mary and the monastery of Trappist monks. It is the only Trappist monastery in Southeastern Europe. At the beginning of the 20th century, with 219 monks, the Abbey was the largest Trappist abbey in the world. In 2017 the Abbey was closed down. In 2004, KONS has declared the abbey Church of the Dormition of the Blessed Virgin Mary a National monument of Bosnia and Herzegovina.

== History ==
=== Establishment ===
The building of the complex of the Mariastern Abbey in Banja Luka is associated with the arrival of the trappist Franz Pfanner in Bosnia. After 23 months of unsuccessful attempts to set up a Trappist monastery in Hungary, Croatia and Lower Styria, and on learning that a law had been passed in the Ottoman Empire allowing the Christians to buy land, Pfanner came to Banja Luka, where on 10 June 1869 he bought 100 acres of land in Delibašino Selo near Banja Luka for the sum of 1.400 ducats. On 21 June 1869, the Trappists came to the plot of land they had purchased in Delibašino Selo. This is thus regarded as the date on which the Mariastern Abbey was founded.

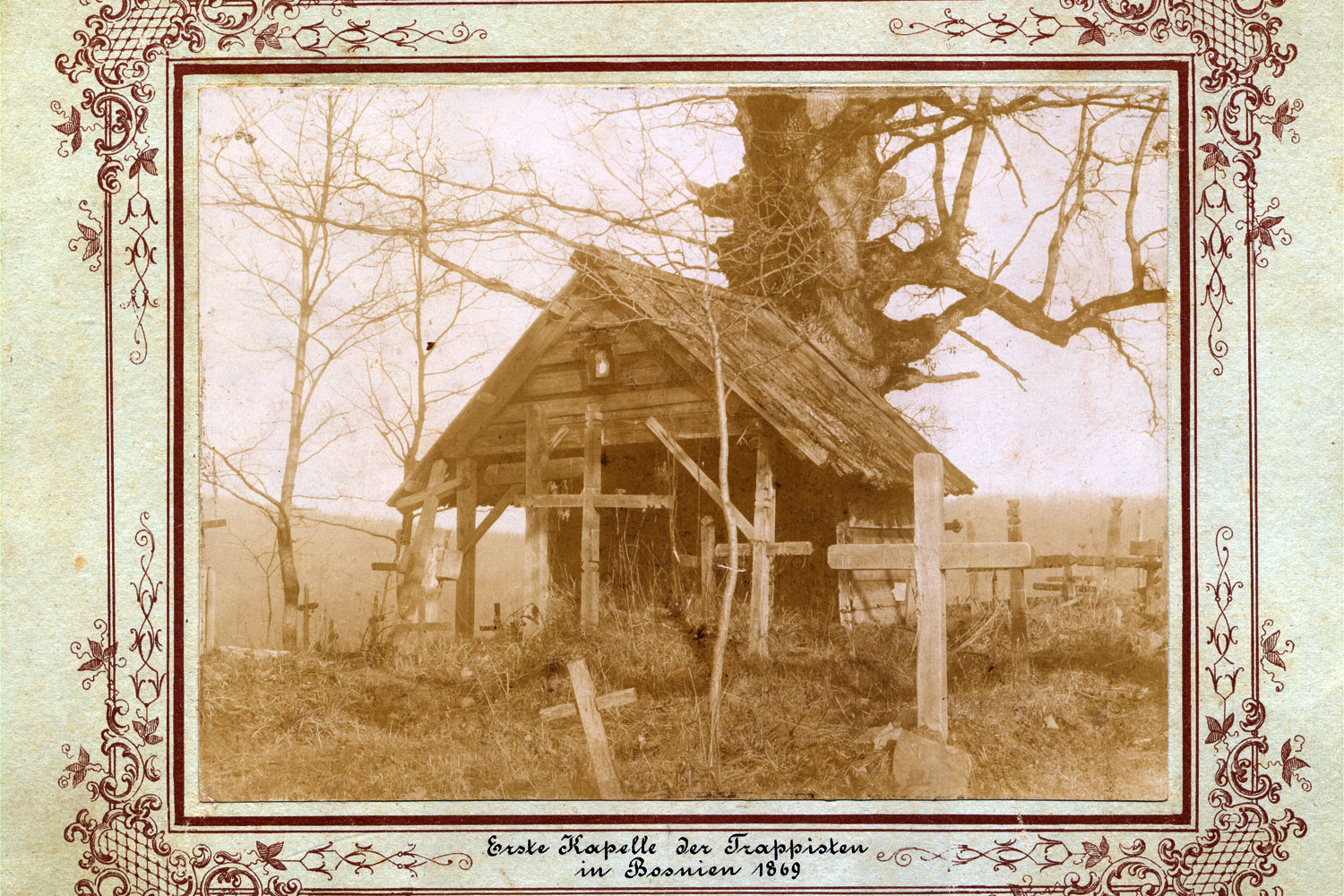
Trappist chapel near Banja Luka, 1869

The Trappists made themselves temporary accommodation in a wooden hut. Nine Trappist brothers lived there and they called this shed the cradle. Inside the shed were two wooden barrels in which the Trappists kept their books, breviary, ink and paper. They remained in this hut until 7 July 1869.

On 27 June 1869 Pfanner chose the site for the construction of the monastery beside the Vrbas River, so as to be able to use its waterpower. During the construction of the temporary monastery, Pfanner faced a number of problems with regard to the registration of the land he had purchased. Pfanner called the temporary monastery Mariastern as an expression of gratitude to the old Mariastern Cistercian convent in Saxonian Lausitz, which gave a gift of 2,000 florins for the purchase of the land. The Trappists lived in the temporary monastery from 7 September 1869 to 24 December 1870. On 7 March 1870 Holy See confirmed the new establishment and the Apostolic vicar, Paškal Vujičić gave his consent. Immediately after moving into the temporary monastery, the Trappists started to prepare the construction site for building a larger monastery according to the plans made by Pfanner himself. In late 1869, before Christmas, Pfanner travelled to Rome to obtain permission to build a new monastery. Two days later a rescript arrived from Rome for the establishment of a monastery, with a clause from Propaganda requiring the Trappists to build an orphanage as soon as possible. The orphanage was opened on 1 March 1878.

=== Development of the monastery ===
In the spring of 1870 work started on the foundation of the monastery and on 9 September 1870 the first bricks were laid. By Christmas that year the west wing was built, facing the Vrbas River. Even though the work was not completed the Trappists moved into the new monastery on Christmas Eve, 24 December 1870.

The General Chapter of the Order in 1872 appointed Pfanner as prior of the Mariastern.

The construction of the monastery church began in 1872. By the end of the year the roof was erected, and the church was completed in 1873. In order to justify it to the Turkish authorities the church had to be incorporated into the monastery. In the first couple of years, monks were buying up the surrounding lots from their owners. The estate in Delibašino selo gradually crossed the Vrbas and extended to the left bank of the river. Until 1873 Mariastern was a priory and that year it became part of Notre-Dame de port-du-Salut abbey.

=== Establishment and development of the Abbey ===
In the first years of the Austro-Hungarian rule in Bosnia and Herzegovina, the monastery played an important role in settling the foreigners in area around the monastery, with father Franz Pfanner as the main person agitating for German colonization in the Vrbas valley. After Pfanner's departure for Mariannhill, on 25 August 1883 the General Chapter appointed Bonaventure Bayer titular Prior of the monastery. Once he assumed these duties the monastery began gradually to improve. The number of brothers in the monastery increased to 90, and the monastery's economy was revived. The Vicar General and Abbot of Sept-fons, Jerome, visited the monastery in May 1885 and was very satisfied with the state of affairs he found in the monastery and its commercial operations. His recommendation was that the Mariastern monastery be designated as an abbey, which gained the backing of the members of the Chapter of the Trappist Order who forwarded this proposal to Rome. By Rescript of the Congregation of Bishops and Monks of 4 December 1885 the monastery was raised to the status of an abbey and Bonaventure, at the time Prior of the monastery, was appointed as its first Abbot on 27 January 1886.

In 1878 a hospital was built 50m to the north of the monastery. It was opened on 2 February 1879, when it admitted its first patients. A new orphanage was built in 1879. The first school was opened on 1 September 1880. The number of people in the monastery started to increase, and more space was needed. As a result, a new monastery building was erected in 1889, with a church but without any bell tower. The bell tower was erected in 1896, another wing of the monastery was added in 1897 with the assistance of donations from Germany, Austria, Hungary, the Netherlands and Switzerland.

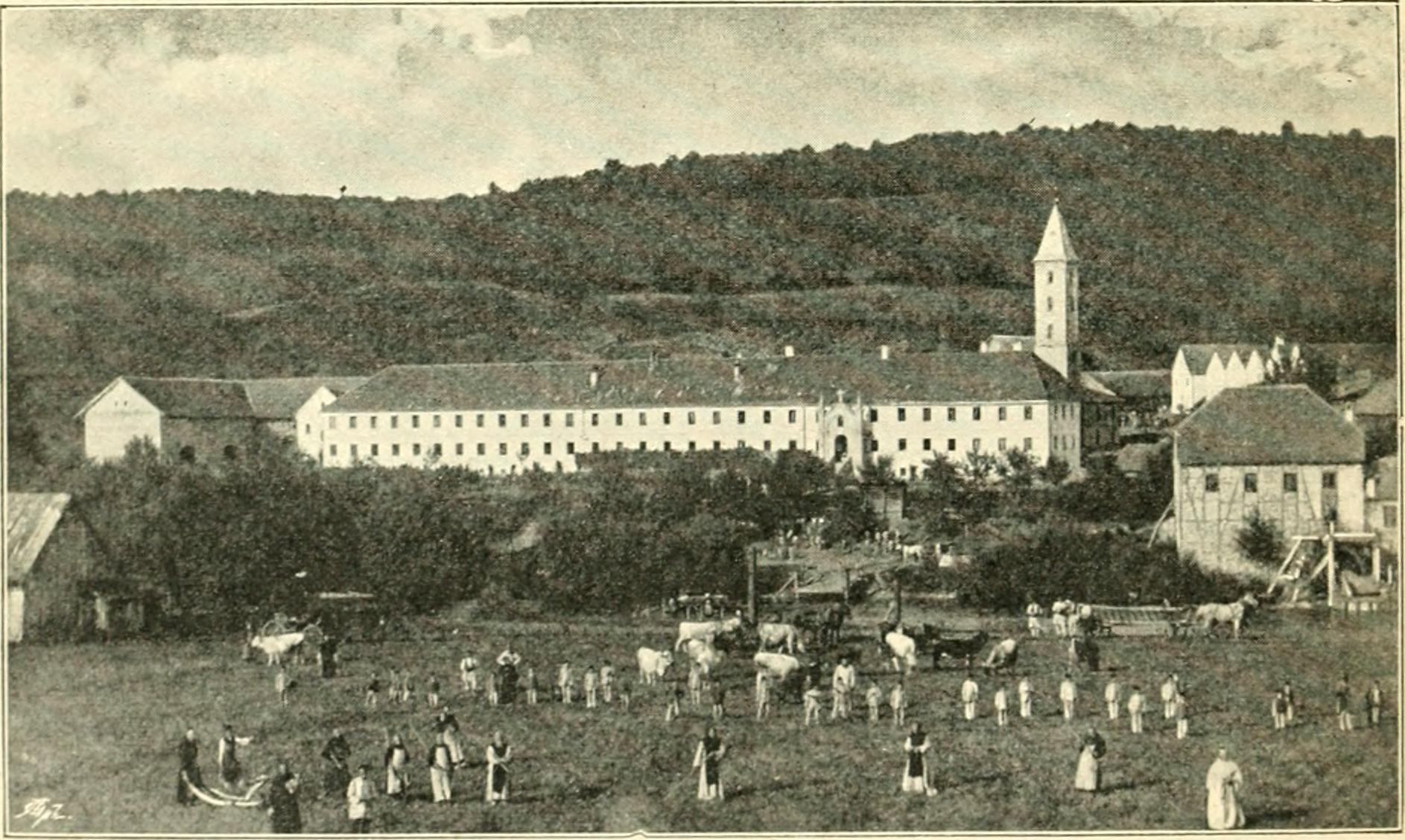
Abbey in 1897

In 1893, Dominik Assfalg was elected as the new Abbot of Mariastern. He was born on 22 October 1847 in Grundsheim, Württemberg. He came to Mariastern on 22 December 1877, and was ordained to the priesthood on 2 May 1886. In 1888 he was appointed Prior. He also ran the orphanage from 30 June 1890 until 11 October 1891. He was consecrated Abbot on 15 April 1894 by the Bishop of Banja Luka, Marijan Marković. Abbot Assfalg continued to work on rounding off the real estate belonging to the Mariastern Abbey by exchanging and buying real estate. After long negotiations with the Government Abbot Assfalg entered into a contract to build a bridge over Vrbas River, under the terms of which both parties took an equal share in the construction costs and the maintenance of the bridge. On 28 March 1904 the construction of the iron bridge began. The iron structure was assembled on 15 October 1904, the bridge was opened to the public on 12 November 1904, and on 27 November 1904 Bishop Marijan Marković consecrated the bridge. The bridge was destroyed during World War II and later rebuilt. In 1897 a new textile factory was built and in 1898 both the textile factory and the brewery began operating. In 1895, to power these new facilities, a 50-horsepower steam engine had been purchased. In the brewery, textile factory and mill, the power was increased by a steam engine, but because it was insufficient, a 60-horsepower turbine was built in 1899 on the Vrbas River. In addition, a timber dam was built across the Vrbas to provide the necessary water fall to operate the turbine. On 27 March 1899 the Abbey acquired electric lighting, and after 1902 some houses near the Abbey, as well as in Banja Luka itself, also acquired electric lighting. Later, at the request of the people of Banja Luka, the power plant was enlarged and given extra capacity with new 300 horsepower turbines, and in 1910 the mill was modernised, increasing its production capacity.

In 1891 the printing press was established in the Abbey. It was the first printing press in Banja Luka and was in use until 1946, when the communist authorities prohibited its activities, restricting freedom of the press.

Abbot Dominique Assfalg resigned from his abbatial duties on 4 June 1920. He died on 27 January 1922 and was buried in the Abbey graveyard. He was succeeded by Abbot Bonaventura Diamant who was born on 9 November 1884 in Tübingen, Würtemberg. He completed his higher education in Rome, and was engaged in philosophy, metaphysics, biology, theology, mathematics and physics. He was ordained to the priesthood on 25 December 1912, and appointed as Abbot on 29 May 1920. On 7 June 1924 the Trappists moved to the new monastery. The building had originally been intended as the orphanage, and was enlarged in 1914. From 1914 to 1918 the building housed the injured, and later disabled war veterans. In 1929 a new wing was added to the Abbey. The foundations for the new church were laid on 20 August 1925. The church was enlarged in 1928. During Abbot Diamant's time, after 1924, as a result of the fierce competition that followed World War I, the power plant, textile factory and brewery were handed over to a joint stock company, Industrial Community. The mill was leased, and the cheese making plant continued to be run by Trappists. The Abbey was deeply in debt, and was thus forced to close down the orphanage. All its debts were paid off by 1942 with the money earned from selling timber from the Abbey's forest.

=== Decline of the Abbey ===
After World War II the entire holdings of the Abbey were expropriated. Old and new cemetery, the old and new church, and a few residential premises in the new monastery remained under the possession of the Abbey. Apart from that, the Abbey was deprived by expropriation of all its buildings, all its facilities, and its entire agricultural and industrial inventory located on the expropriated land, all of which was transferred to the state. The Supreme Court in Sarajevo confirmed this ruling on 31 July 1946. Abbot Diamant and most of the Trappists left the Mariastern Abbey in 1944. After World War II and the enlargement of the Banja Luka Brewery, the site of the original monastery complex contained just a few of the commercial facilities of the former abbey complex, which were rebuilt, enlarged and converted to the needs of the Brewery. Other buildings in the former abbey complex, the old church, the monastery and some commercial facilities were demolished and new buildings erected on the site.

The major part of the new monastery was rebuilt for the needs of the rehabilitation centre, while the church, several rooms on the upper floor in part of the right wing of the monastery building, and the monastery cemetery remained in the possession of the monastery. The major earthquake of 27 October 1969 destroyed the monastery buildings (completely) and the church (partially).

=== Present ===
Two Trappist monks currently live in the Mariastern monastery, Fathers Zvonko Topić and Tomislav Topić. They run a parish and produce Trappist cheese. The current superior of the monastery is François de Place, apostolic delegate of the Congregation for Institutes of Consecrated Life and Societies of Apostolic Life for the Mariastern monastery.

The restored large abbey church of the Visitation of the Blessed Virgin Mary is used as a parish church since Bishop Alfred Pichler established a new parish in Banja Luka on 13 May 1973.

== Superiors of the Abbey ==
- Franz Pfanner, prior (1872–1883)
- Bonaventure I Baier, prior (1883–1886); abbot (1886–1893)
- Dominique Assfalg, abbot (1894–1920)
- Bonaventure II Diamant, abbot (1920–1957)
  - Fulgencije Oraić, prior (1944–1946)
  - Flavijan Grbac, superior (1946–1957)
- Tiburcije Penca, superior (1957–1964)
- Fulgencij Oraić, superior (1964); abbot (1964–1977)
- Anto Artner, superior (1977–1991)
- Nivard Volkmer, superior (1991–2002)
- Phillippe Vanneste, superior (2002–2003)
- François de Place, superior (since 2003)
