= Franz Pfanner =

Austrian Trappist abbot

Servant of God Franz Pfanner CMM
- Abbot of Mariannhill Abbey
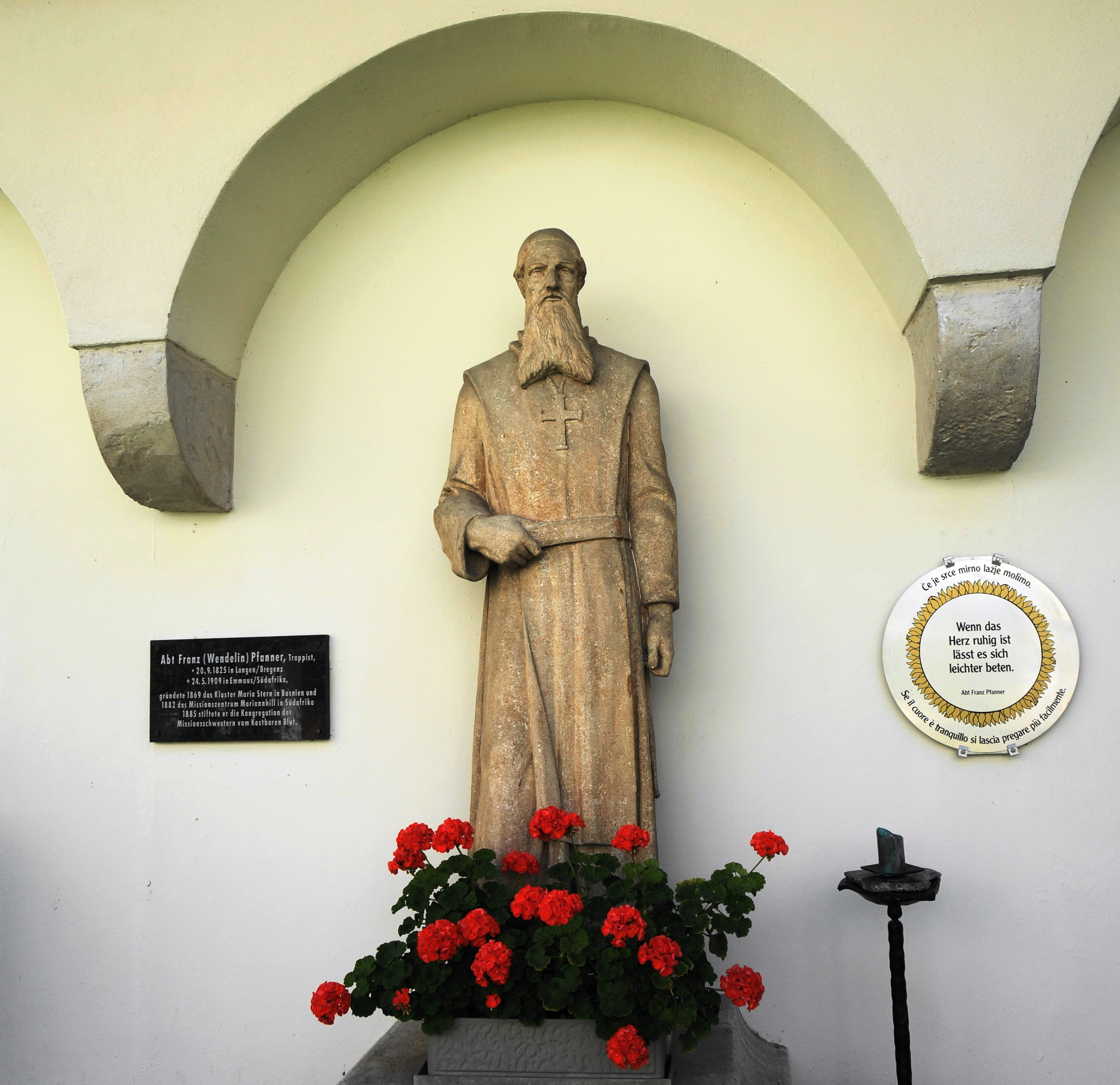
- Statue of Pfanner in the courtyard of Wernberg Castle, Carinthia, Austria
- In office: 1885–1893

Orders
- Rank: Priest

Personal details
- Born: 25 September 1825 Langen bei Bregenz, Austrian Empire
- Died: 24 May 1909 (aged 83–84) Emaus, Cape Colony (now South Africa)
- Denomination: Catholic Church

Franz Pfanner, CMM (also Francis; 25 September 1825 – 24 May 1909) was an Austrian Catholic monk and founder of what would become the Mariannhillers. He was formerly a member of the Trappists, from whom the new order was branched off.

Pfanner founded the Mariannhill Monastery in South Africa and the Trappist Mariastern Abbey in Banja Luka, Bosnia and Herzegovina. He also founded the Missionary Sisters of the Precious Blood.

== Life ==
Born as Wendelinus Pfanner to farmers Francis Anton and Anna Maria Fink Pfanner on 25 September 1825, Pfanner attended high schools in Feldkirch and humanistic studies at Innsbruck. Later, he studied philosophy in Padua (1845) and theology in Brixen (1846). In 1848, he battled tuberculosis. On 27 July 1850, he was appointed parish priest at Haselstauden, near Dornbirn.

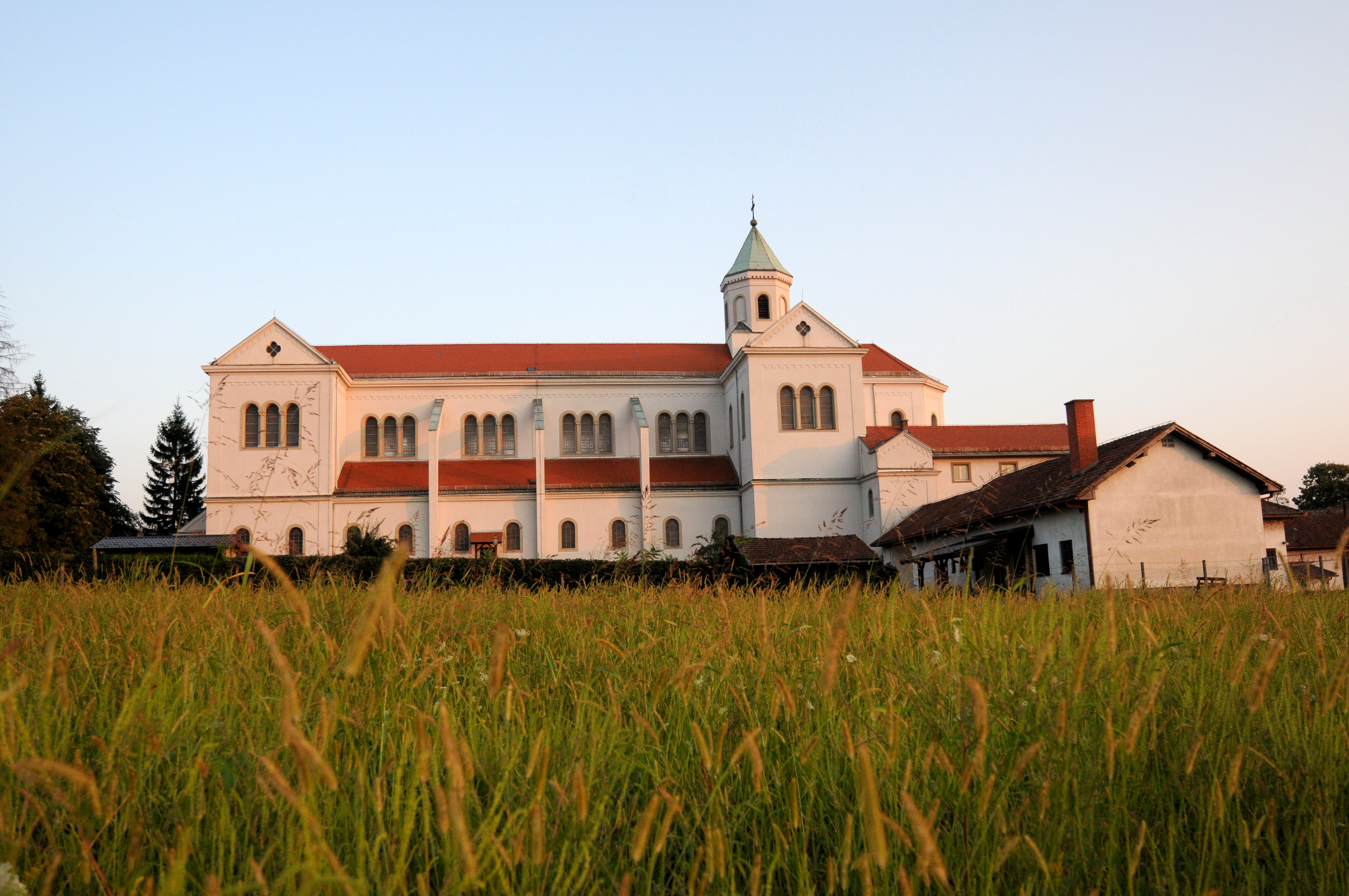
Mariastern Abbey

In 1859, he was appointed an Austrian army chaplain in the Italian campaign against Napoleon III, but the war was over before he could take up his appointment. After serving as confessor to the Sisters of Mercy at Agram for several years and operating a ministry in the Lepoglava prison, he went to Rome (in 1862 for the canonization of the Japanese martyrs), where he came into contact with the Trappists for the first time. Awaiting his bishop's permission to join this order, he went on a pilgrimage to Palestine in 1863.

On 9 October he entered the Trappist Priory of Mariawald (Germany), and was given the religious name Franz, after St. Francis of Assisi. He was later professed at the priory and made sub-prior. He returned to Rome in 1866, where he reorganized the well-known monastery at Tre Fontane. In 1867, he set up a new Trappist monastery in Austria (Donaumonarchy). He also conceived the idea of a foundation in Turkey. In 1869, despite serious difficulties he opened the monastery of Mariastern in Bosnia, near Banja Luka, which was raised to the status of an abbey in 1879. There he led efforts to teach children, manage orphanages, provide medical care and improve methods of building and farming.

In 1879, Bishop James David Ricards of the Eastern Vicariate of the Capeof Good Hope was in Europe, seeking Trappists to evangelize the local Africans. At the General Chapter of Sept-Fons (France), Ricards of Grahamstown (South Africa), made an appeal for a Trappist foundation in the area of the Sunday River. Pfanner, the youngest prior present, stated: "If no one will go, I will go." At the end of July 1880, he arrived at Dunbrody, the site purchased by Bishop Ricards, arriving with a team of about 30 monks from Mariastern. Due to drought, winds and baboons, he declared the site unsuitable after a trial of several years. With the permission of Bishop Charles Jolivet, O.M.I., of the Natal Vicariate, in December 1882, he purchased the Land Colonization Company a part of the Zoekoegat farm, near Pinetown. The monastery of Mariannhill was built here.

On 27 December 1882 the Monastery of Mariannhill was founded near Durban. Pfanner was an early opponent of racial segregation. Already in 1884, Pfanner decided that they would make no distinction of color or religion in their school.

In 1885, Mariannhill was created an abbey, and Pfanner elected as the first mitred abbot. In 1898, it became the largest Christian monastery in the world, with 285 monks. It grew to become the centre of a great network of mission stations spread over a vast area. In 1890, he was appointed Vicar General of the Order for South Africa. In 1893 he resigned his prelacy. In 1894, at the outstation of Lourdes Mission, together with Bro. Xavier, Pfanner took up residence at the mission station of Emaus. At the time of his death in 1909, there were fifty-five priests, 223 lay brothers, and 326 nuns at work in forty-two mission stations.

Finding the need of a sisterhood to teach girls, he founded the Missionary Sisters of the Precious Blood in 1885. Mostly the daughters of German farmers, the “Red Sisters” dressed in red skirts, black capes, and white blouses and veils.

== Formation of the Missionary Order of Mariannhill ==
In 1906, Pope Pius X approved the constitutions of the Missionary Sisters of the Precious Blood. In 1909, a few months before Pfanner's death, the Holy See, at the petition of the Trappists of Mariannhill, made a considerable change in their status. The Cistercian Rule in its rigour, for which Abbot Pfanner was most zealous, was found to be an obstacle to missionary development in some particulars. Hence they were given a milder rule and separated from the Trappist Order by official decree. They became a missionary order in their own right, the Missionary Order of Mariannhill.
