= Oswald Georg Hirmer =

German Roman Catholic bishop

Oswald Georg Hirmer (February 28, 1930 Amberg, Germany– March 5, 2011) was a Roman Catholic bishop of the Roman Catholic Diocese of Umtata, South Africa.

Born in Germany, Hirmer was ordained a priest in 1955. In 1997, he was named bishop of the Umtata Diocese. Hirmer retired in 2008 and henceforth was bishop emeritus. Bishop Hirmer died on March 5, 2011.
