= Patrick H. Scully =

Catholic priest and astronomer

Patrick H. Scully was a Catholic priest and astronomer who served as a missionary in Cape Town and built the first Catholic parish church in South Africa.

== Biography ==
After the Anglo-Dutch Treaty of 1814, the Colonial Office gave permission for a Catholic priest to be stationed in Cape Town. Irish priest Patrick H. Scully arrived in Cape Town on 1 January 1820, in the company of the bishop Edward Bede Slater. On 13 February 1820, Scully opened a church in a repurposed store on Buitekant street, donated by a local Catholic, Philip Albertus. There he said Mass on Sundays and holy days at 11 AM. He initially ministered mainly to local Irish soldiers.

Rufane Shaw Donkin, the acting governor of Cape Town, approved a salary of £75 for Scully on 17 January 1821. In April 1821, Scully petitioned the burgher senate for land to build a proper church. The senate agreed, and Scully announced the planned construction in September. In November, the Cape Gazette announced that the plans for the church were available to view.

In 1821, the churchwardens of Cape Town wrote to Slater with a number of complaints about Scully. Scully, they said, only offered Mass on Sundays, gave infrequent and inaudible sermons, failed to follow up on home visits to parishioners, and was irregular in recording baptisms. They also claimed that Scully was breaking the law by baptizing slaves. In response, Slater told the churchwardens not to interfere in Scully's pastoral decisions.

Low donations from parishioners were a recurring problem. In 1821, the churchwardens attempted to raise funding for the parish by charging a fee for access to the sacraments. Scully continued to perform sacraments without their permission, and fired the sacristan when he attempted to interfere.

Lord Charles Somerset, the governor of Cape Town, returned from leave in December 1821 and stopped Scully's salary. Scully therefore looked for work elsewhere, and that same year, Fearon Fallows, head of the Royal Observatory, Cape of Good Hope, wrote to John Barrow asking for approval to hire Scully as an assistant. Scully began work on 18 January 1822, and on 4 April 1822 the Board of Longitude sent their official approval for the decision to hire Scully at a salary of £100.

In a letter to Barrow, Fallows wrote of Scully:

He is a person of gentlemanly manners, having received a good classical education & as much mathematical knowledge as is usually taught in Catholic Colleges ... he is of a tractable, mild and amiable disposition, never giving me a cross word, and withal desirous of improving himself in the knowledge of the various parts of Practical Astronomy.

Fallows also praised Scully in a letter to John Herschel, writing:

Scully ... is a quiet, gentle, good natured man and does his best (which is saying a great deal) and can really now observe very well with the Transit Instrument. My friends in England will no doubt marvel in finding me speak well of a Catholic, and a priest too. Though I am as high church as any man and a sincere believer in the articles &c, our most excellent establishment, I cannot bring myself (with all the causistry I am master of) to think that a person may not be a good Catholic & astronomer at the same time. You need be under no alarm of conversion, for we have no opportunity of talking about the question being sufficiently employed in the day with reducing the observations & at night we are not likely to trouble ourselves about the matter.

Construction began on Scully's church on 28 October 1822. Due to continuing funding issues, Scully took out a number of loans in 1823 to fund the ongoing construction of the church. He never paid interest on these loans, and they were the subject of extensive litigation after his departure. In March 1824, he began to say Mass in the unfinished chapel.

In July 1824, Fallows found Scully in bed with Fallows's 17-year-old maid. Due to the "improprieties" committed and the "violence of [Scully's] manner" when discovered, Fallows promptly dismissed Scully, who was also defrocked over the incident. Scully left the colony for London on 11 July 1824, aboard the Venus. Upon his departure, he entrusted the church he had built to two curators. He was succeeded as chaplain by Theodore Wagner. Fallows asked the Admiralty to continue Scully's salary for six months after his dismissal, but the request was declined, and Scully was formally dismissed on 5 October 1824.
