= John Pawson =

British architectural designer

John Pawson CBE
- Born: 1949 (age 76–77); Halifax, England
- Occupations: Author, Architectural designer
- Spouse: Catherine Pawson
- Writing career
- Subjects: Architecture, Simplicity
- Website: www.johnpawson.com

John Ward Pawson CBE, RDI (born 1949, Halifax, England) is a British architectural designer whose work is known for its minimalist aesthetic.

== Biography ==
Pawson was born and brought up in Halifax, Yorkshire, the youngest of five children. Coming from a wealthy family, he was schooled at Eton. After a period in the family textile business Pawson left for Japan in his mid-twenties, moving to Tokyo during the final year of his stay, where he visited the studio of Japanese architect and designer Shiro Kuramata. On his return to England he enrolled at the Architectural Association School of Architecture in London, leaving to establish his own practice in 1981.

Pawson never sat the requisite exams to practise as an architect and as such is known as an 'architectural designer'. In 2013, the Architectural Registration Board (ARB) of UK asked Dezeen magazine not to refer him as architect, although this was criticised by the publication.

Pawson's work focuses on ways of approaching fundamental problems of space, proportion, light and materials.

Whilst private houses have remained at the core of the work, projects have spanned a wide range of scales and building typologies, from the Sackler Crossing across the lake at the Royal Botanic Gardens, Kew, a flagship store for Calvin Klein and major commissions for Ian Schrager, to ballet sets, yacht interiors, a new Cistercian monastery in Bohemia and a Second World War telecommunications bunker in Berlin. John Pawson transformed a former bunker into The Feuerle Collection. The practice is currently involved in the creation of a new permanent home for the Design Museum in London.

An exhibition of Pawson's work was held at the Design Museum in September 2010.

In May 2018, Pawson's first photography exhibition took place at The Store X, 180 Strand, London. All 320 images from his series Spectrum, first published as a book by Phaidon of the same name, were shown as an architectural installation. The immersive experience used the entirety of the gallery space, where the chromatic spectrum was legible from both ends of the room.

He was appointed a Commander of the Order of the British Empire (CBE) in the 2019 New Year Honours for services to Design and Architecture.

== Awards ==
- Blueprint Architect of the Year (2005)
- RSA Royal Designer for Industry (2005)
- Region Skane Award (2006)
- Wallpaper* House of the Year (2006)
- Stephen Lawrence Prize (2008)
- Fondazione Frate Sole International Prize for Sacred Architecture (2008)
- RIBA National Award (2008)
- RIBA Arts & Leisure Regional Award (2008)
- RIBA London Special Award (2008)
- German Design Council Interior Designer of the Year (2014)

== Notable projects ==
London's Cannelle Cake Shop, several Calvin Klein stores; such as the ice palace on Madison Avenue, work for Jigsaw (clothing retailer), New Wardour Castle apartments (2001), the Nový Dvůr Monastery, Czech Republic (2004), Abbaye Notre-Dame de Sept-Fons, France, Hotel Puerta America, Madrid (2005), Medina House in Tunis, Sackler Crossing, a walkway over the lake at the Royal Botanic Gardens, Kew (2006), the Church of St. Moritz, Augsburg (2008), Claridges ArtSpace and cafe (2022/2023)
