= Mariannhill =

- Location within KwaZulu-Natal Location within South Africa
- Coordinates: 29°51′S 30°50′E
- Country: South Africa
- Province: KwaZulu-Natal
- Municipality: eThekwini
- Main Place: Pinetown

Area
  - Total: 3.46 km^{2} (1.34 sq mi)

Population (2001)
  - Total: 835
  - Density: 241/km^{2} (625/sq mi)
- Time zone: UTC+2 (SAST)
- Postal code (street): 3610

Mariannhill is a cluster of suburbs and townships south of Pinetown in eThekwini Municipality in KwaZulu Natal, South Africa.

In 1882, Trappist missionary Father Franz Pfanner established Mariannhill Monastery 16 km west of Durban. He promoted local development and opened schools, health clinics, craft workshops, printing presses and farms providing work for hundreds of religious workers and others. The name is derived from those of the Virgin Mary and her mother Saint Anne.

The Mariannhill Toll Road, a section of the N3 national route, begins in the area.

Due to its location close to the industrial townships of Pinetown and Durban, Mariannhill has attracted people from around the province of KwaZulu Natal who are seeking employment. This has led to the development and growth of several townships in Mariannhill: Mpola, Thornwood, Dassenhoek, Tshelimnyama, Mariannridge, KwaMamdekazi, St Wendolins, and others.

In 1909 the St. Francis College was founded in Mariannhill, combining separate schools for boys and girls that had operated since the mid/late 1880s. Its faculty included the Zulu writer and poet Benedict Wallet Vilakazi.

== See also ==
- Mariannhillers, the Congregation of the Missionaries of Mariannhill
