= Sept-Fons Abbey =

Abbey in Allier, France

Coordinates: 46°32′42″N 3°42′19″E

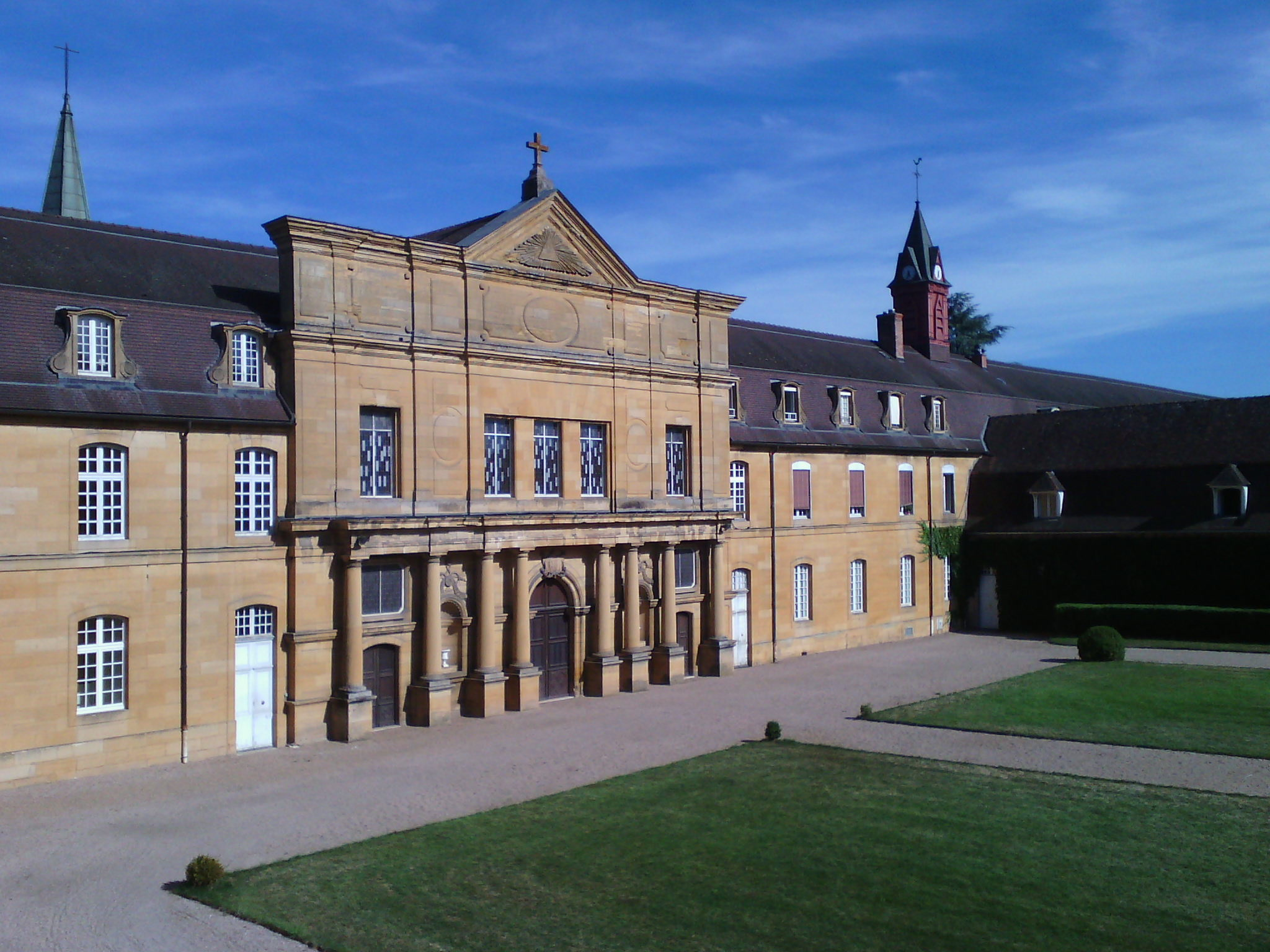
Sept-Fons Abbaye Facade Eglise

Sept-Fons Abbey, Notre-Dame de Sept-Fons or Notre-Dame de Saint-Lieu Sept-Fons is a Trappist monastery at Diou in Bourbonnais in the diocese of Moulins in France. Around ninety monks currently live in the monastery, many of whom are novices sent from monasteries around the world.

== First foundation ==
It was founded in 1132 as a Cistercian monastery by Guichard and Guillaume de Bourbon, of the family of Bourbon-Lancy which gave kings to France, Italy, and Spain; this gave rise to the name "Royal Abbey". The initial generosity of the founders ensured that the building of the church, dedicated to the Blessed Virgin Mary, and of the monastery was soon completed.

Thereafter however the monks found themselves poverty-stricken, and were driven to selling off parts of the endowment in order to provide themselves with the necessities of life. They were much encouraged by a visit from Bernard of Clairvaux in 1138. Pope Adrian III took the monastery under his protection in 1158; and Pope Alexander III ratified the foundation by bull in 1164.

The community remained a small one, and until the reform of 1663, the number of monks never exceeded 15.

At first the monastery was only known under the name of "Notre-Dame de Saint-Lieu". It was only after a century that "Sept-Fons" was added, derived either from seven fountains or from seven canals leading water to, the abbey.

From the middle of the 15th century the abbey suffered a great deal from the incessant wars. The monks were often forced to leave it; it was frequently looted and its buildings demolished. Under such circumstances, the discipline of the community was bound to suffer.

== Trappist Reform ==
In 1656 Eustache de Beaufort, at the age of 20 years, was made abbot. For the first seven years there was no improvement; but after that time he resolved on a complete change and decided to join the abbey to the Trappist reform. There were then only four monks, who refused to accept the new rule; he therefore granted each of them a pension and dismissed them. It was not long before a number of novices presented themselves for admission. They were sent to the abbey of La Trappe, to make their novitiate under Armand Jean le Bouthillier de Rancé, whom Eustache also visited for advice in 1667.

After this, with royal aid, Sept-Fons was rebuilt on a grander scale, and continued in prosperity until the abbey was suppressed in 1791 in the French Revolution.

== Second foundation ==
In 1845, when the Trappists of the Abbaye du Gard were obliged to abandon their monastery, their abbot, Stanislaus, purchased the ruins of Sept-Fons, where he installed his community and rebuilt the church and regular structures. In 1847 he was elected vicar-general of the Congregation of the Ancient Reform of Our Lady of La Trappe, which followed the constitutions of de Rancé. In 1892, when the three congregations were united in one order, the then abbot of Sept-Fons, Sebastian Wyart, was elected first abbot-general, and, a little later, abbot of Cîteaux.

Its earlier foundations included Notre-Dame de la Consolation near Beijing, China, Notre-Dame des Iles, New Caledonia, Notre-Dame de Sept-Douleurs at Latroun in modern-day Israel, and Notre-Dame de Maristella Estado de São Paulo, Brazil.

== Nový Dvůr ==
More recently the community at Sept-Fons has settled a daughter house at Nový Dvůr in the Czech Republic, the first monastic foundation since the fall of the Communist government, and in 2001 commissioned the English minimalist architect John Pawson to undertake the building conversion.
