= Vryheid =

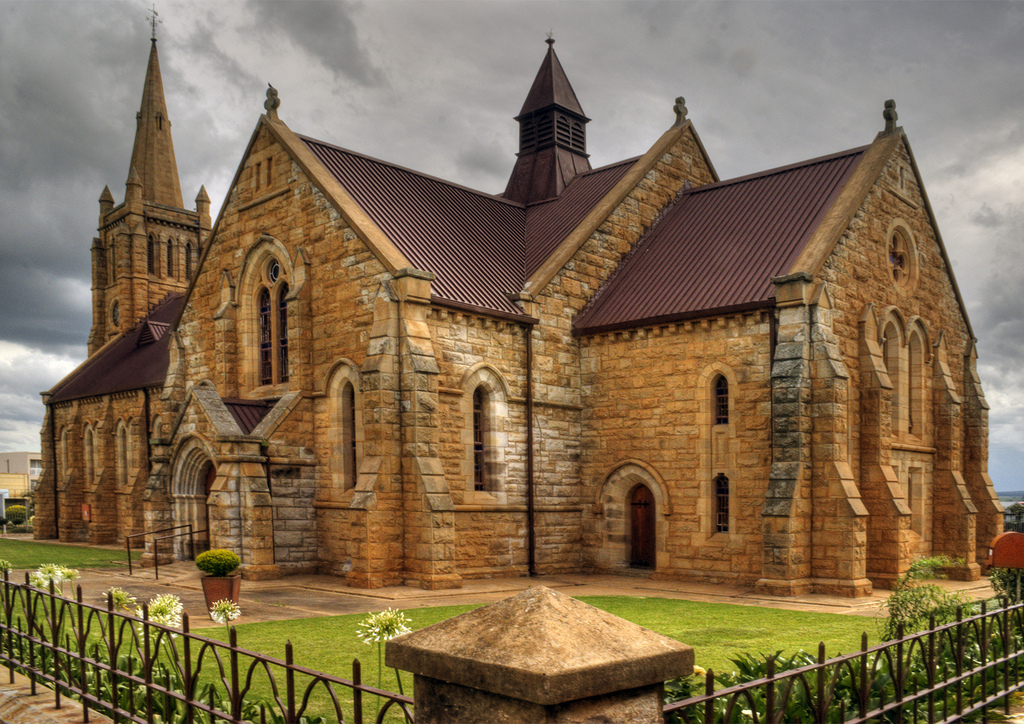
- Dutch Reformed Church on Church Square.

- Location within KwaZulu-Natal Location within South Africa
- Coordinates: 27°46′01″S 30°48′00″E
- Country: South Africa
- Province: KwaZulu-Natal
- District: Zululand
- Municipality: Abaqulusi
- Established: 1884

Area
  - Total: 48.71 km^{2} (18.81 sq mi)

Population (2011)
  - Total: 47,365
  - Density: 972.4/km^{2} (2,518/sq mi)

Racial makeup (2011)
  - Black African: 84.5%
  - Coloured: 1.7%
  - Indian/Asian: 1.3%
  - White: 12.1%
  - Other: 0.3%

First languages (2011)
  - Zulu: 79.8%
  - Afrikaans: 10.2%
  - English: 6.2%
  - Other: 3.7%
- Time zone: UTC+2 (SAST)
- Postal code (street): 3100
- PO box: 3100
- Area code: 034

Vryheid (Zulu: eFilidi/iFilidi/Abaqulusi) is a coal mining and cattle ranching town in northern KwaZulu-Natal, South Africa. Vryheid is the Afrikaans word for "freedom", while its original name of Abaqulusi reflects the abaQulusi clan based in the local area.

== History ==
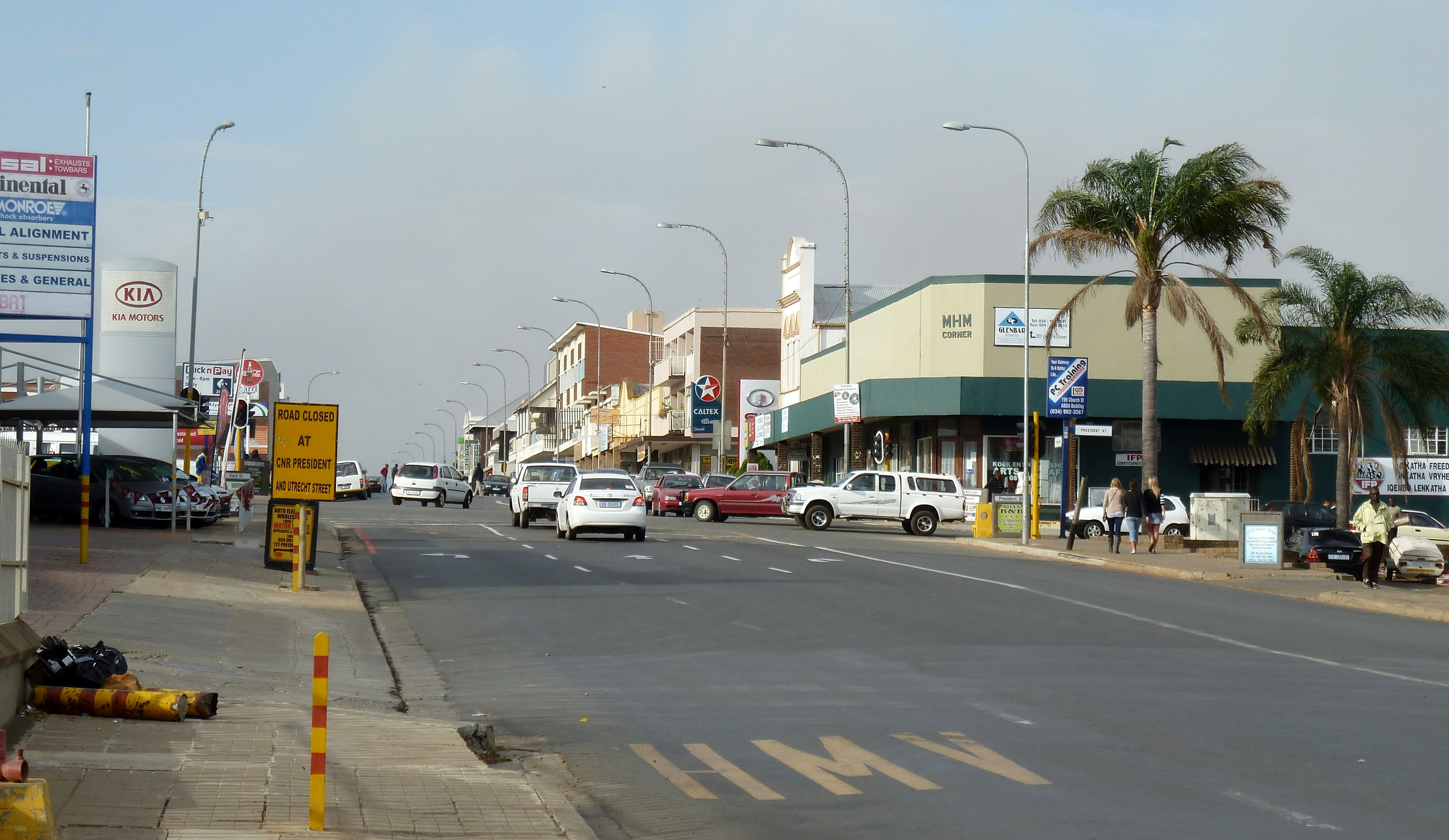
View of Church Street in Vryheid's Commercial District.

After Boer farmers, who lived in the Vryheid area, had helped King Dinuzulu defeat his rival chief Zibhebhu for succession of the Zulu throne, land that they occupied was given to them by cession from the Zulu king along the banks of the Mfolozi River. On August 5, 1884, the Boers formed the Nieuwe Republiek (New Republic) with Vryheid as its capital and its sovereignty was recognized by Germany and Portugal colonizers. It was later incorporated into the South African Republic, but at the end of the Second Boer War the town and its surrounding area was absorbed into the Natal colony by the British. Vryheid is located along the Transnet Coalline.

== Education ==
In 2007, Inkamana High School and Vryheid Comprehensive Secondary School were amongst several schools recognised as "historic schools". Funding of six million rand a year was earmarked for these two and Adams College, Ohlange High School and Inanda Seminary to make them academies focussing on Maths, Science and Technology.

Other schools are Hoërskool Vryheid, which uses both Afrikaans and English as the medium of instruction and Hoërskool Pionier which uses Afrikaans as medium of instruction.

== Sport ==
Kilian Academy, a martial arts academy instructing in the arts of Brazilian jiu-jitsu and Kickboxing, is situated in Vryheid.

Vryheid Wrestling Academy is one of the top wrestling clubs in the province of Kwa-Zulu Natal.

=== Hanami Gi-Challenge ===
The Hanami Gi-Challenge (commonly known as The Challenge) was a South African Brazilian Jiu-Jitsu (BJJ) tournament hosted annually by Hanami Martial Arts. The inaugural event was held on 27 April 2014 at the Indoor Speedball Club in Vryheid, South Africa. The tournament attracted competitors from across Southern Africa.

The second Hanami Gi-Challenge took place on 26 April 2015 at Pioneer High School in Vryheid and attracted 81 Brazilian Jiu-Jitsu practitioners from across Southern Africa., including competitors associated with the Extreme Fighting Championship (EFC). At the time, participants described the event as one of the premier Brazilian Jiu-Jitsu tournaments in South Africa.

== Religion ==
The Inkamana Abbey, a Roman Catholic Benedictine abbey, is located in the town.

== Heritage sites ==
The Dutch Reform Church in Vryheid, better known as Die Moeder Gemeente (Afrikaans for the Mother Congregation), has been added to the list of 12 Gorgeous Churches and Cathedrals in Africa, by AFK Insider.

== Water shortages ==
The town experienced water shortages from 2016 to 2017 due to neglect of infrastructure. Pumps and pipelines were allowed to fall into a state of disrepair, forcing many town's residents to collect water from 15 communal water tanks provided by the municipality. In its aftermath the Bhekuzulu clinic received 550 cases of diarrhea a month. Other residents invested at great personal cost in boreholes, water tanks, pumps, filters and power generators. Three sewage treatment plants also stopped functioning, polluting the Besterspruit and Klipfontein Dam. Another outbreak of diarrhea occurred in 2019, with 535 people admitted to either Bhekuzulu or Mason Clinics.

== Notable residents ==
- Louis Botha (27 September 1862 – 27 August 1919), Boer War general and first Prime Minister of the Union of South Africa, who represented the district of Vryheid whilst in parliament.
- Charles Theophilus Hahn (1870–1930), Canon of St Peters in Vryheid from 1913.
- Colleen De Reuck (born 13 April 1964), South African long-distance runner was born in Vryheid.
- Cindy Elizabeth Eksteen (born 21 November 1977), South Africa cricketer was born in Vryheid.
- Christian du Plessis (2 July 1944), famous opera singer was born in Vryheid.
- Joe Pietersen (born 18 May 1984), South African rugby player was born in Vryheid.
- Albert William Lee, Anglican Bishop of Zululand lived in Vryheid from 1928 to 1935.
- Mouritz Botha (born 29 January 1982), South African rugby player was born in Vryheid.
- Thomas (Franz Xavier) Spreiter (1865 – 1944), a German missionary lived in Vryheid.
- Bob Holness (1928 – 2012), British radio and television presenter was born in Vryheid.
- Thys Lourens (born 1943), South African rugby player was born in Vryheid.
- Ruan Combrinck (born 1990), South African rugby player was born in Vryheid.
- Keegan Longueira (born 1991), South African cyclist and current holder of the Guinness World Record fastest man ever to cross the continent on bicycle from Cairo to Cape Town.
- Danny Myburgh (born 1965), Springbok amateur boxing champion 1985 to 1988 and Vryheid Sportman of the year 1986 and 1987. Professional South African Lightweight Champion 1993 to 1995. World Lightweight Intercontinental contender 1994 and 1995.
- Rolf Stumpf (1945–2020), statistician and Vice Rector.
- Abraham Kilian (born 1980) is a martial artist originally from Vryheid. He represented Team Canada in both karate and kickboxing, placing 5th at the 2012 WKC World Championships in Montreal. He later won the 2022 AJP Canadian Brazilian Jiu-Jitsu Championship and the 2022 IBJJF Toronto Open. He was also the founder and organiser of the Hanami Gi-Challenge, a Brazilian Jiu-Jitsu tournament that was held in Vryheid in 2014 and 2015.
