= Mariannhillers =

- Congregation of the Missionaries of Mariannhill
- Congregatio Missionariorum de Mariannhill
- Abbreviation: CMM
- Formation: 1909; 117 years ago
- Founder: Franz Pfanner
- Founded at: Mariannhill, KwaZulu Natal, South Africa
- Type: Clerical Religious Congregation of Pontifical Right (for Men)
- Headquarters: Via S. Giovanni Eudes 91, 00163 Rome, Italy
- Locations: South Africa, Austria, Germany, Spain, Switzerland, United Kingdom, United States, Canada, Kenya, Zambia, Zimbabwe, Colombia
- Members: 320 members (214 priests) as of 2018
- Superior General: Michael Mass
- Website: mariannhill.org

The Mariannhillers, officially named the Congregation of the Missionaries of Mariannhill (Latin: Congregatio Missionariorum de Mariannhill; abbreviated CMM) are a religious institute of the Catholic Church founded by Franz Pfanner. They were originally a monastery of Trappist monks founded in 1882 by Pfanner, but were later branched off as a separate congregation by decree of the Holy See.

The name of the congregation comes from Mariannhill, a suburb near Pinetown in KwaZulu Natal, South Africa, where the congregation was first established.

== History ==
In 1882, Pfanner, then prior of Mariastern Abbey, founded a Trappist monastery in Mariannhill at the invitation of Bishop Charles-Constant Jolivet, OMI, Apostolic Vicar of Natal (later Durban). It grew rapidly and by 1885 was raised to the status of an abbey. Pfanner was elected its first abbot. It engaged in missionary work, establishing a number of mission stations where priests and brothers taught the native Zulu people to read and trained them in trades and skills such as farming. The missionaries also emphasised learning Zulu and Xhosa, and they developed standard Zulu grammars. In 1892, Pfanner retired and was succeeded by two abbots: Dom Amandus Schoelzig who died in 1900 and then Abbot Gerard Wolpert who died in 1904.

In 1904, the abbot of Gethsemani Abbey, Edmond Obrecht, was appointed by the Holy See as administrator of Mariannhill. He studied the compatibility between monastic life and missionary work, submitting his report after three years of study. Following his report, the Sacred Congregation of Propaganda directed Bishop William Miller, OMI, the apostolic vicar of Transvaal, to facilitate the independence of the Mariannhill monks. A general chapter of Mariannhill monks in 1908 under Bishop Miller recommended that the monks be formed into a missionary society loosely associated with the Trappists. By 1 January 1910, nearly 20,000 persons, mostly adults, had been baptized in the 55 churches and chapels scattered throughout the 26 missions and stations.

In 1909, the Holy See decreed that the monks of Mariannhill would be completely separate from the Trappists.

Their new constitutions were approved by Pope Pius X in March 1914, though further development stalled due to the outbreak of World War I. After the conclusion of the war, they held their first general chapter in 1920, when they named themselves the Religious Missionaries of Mariannhill and elected Adalbero Fleischer as their first superior general. As their religious habit, they adopted a black cassock, paired with a red cincture for priests, black cincture for other clerics, and black belt for brothers. After their separation from the Trappists, the Mariannhillers continued to work in South Africa, but also established presences in Germany, Switzerland, Austria, the United States, England, Canada and Spain. Their generalate is based in Rome.

During the Holocaust, Blessed Engelmar Unzeitig, a priest of the congregation, was arrested for preaching against the Third Reich and its persecution of the Jews. He died on 2 March 1945 in the Dachau concentration camp, where he was known as the "Angel of Dachau". He was declared venerable by Pope Benedict XVI in 2009, recognised by Pope Francis as a martyr in January 2020, and beatified on 24 September 2016. His feast day is 2 March.

In 1946, Józef Wojaczek from Prudnik received a decree from the general superior of the congregation naming him provincial superior of the Mariannhillers in Poland. Six years later, Wojaczek was arrested by the Department of Security and imprisoned. He was paroled in 1955 and settled in West Germany.

On 10 March 2019, George Kageche Mukua, a priest of the congregation, died as one of the passengers on board Ethiopian Airlines Flight 302.

Pope Francis named a member of the order, Siegfried Mandla Jwara, archbishop of Durban on 9 June 2021.

== See also ==
- Catholic Church in South Africa
- Roman Catholic Diocese of Mariannhill
