= Diocese of Eshowe =

Latin Catholic diocese in South Africa

Coordinates: 33.5833°S 22.2000°E

Diocese of Eshowe Dioecesis Eshovensis

Location
- Country: South Africa
- Metropolitan: Durban

Statistics
- Area: 26,364 km^{2} (10,179 sq mi)
- Population: Total; Catholics: (as of 2004); 2,200,600; 81,000 (3.7%)

Information
- Denomination: Catholic Church
- Sui iuris church: Latin Church
- Rite: Roman Rite

Current leadership
- Pope: Leo XIV
- Bishop: Vacant

The Diocese of Eshowe (Latin: Eshoven(sis)) is a Latin Catholic diocese located in the city of Eshowe in the ecclesiastical province of Durban in South Africa.

== History ==
- 27 August 1921: Established as Apostolic Prefecture of Zululand from the Apostolic Vicariate of Natal
- 11 December 1923: Promoted as Apostolic Vicariate of Eshowe
- 11 January 1951: Promoted as Diocese of Eshowe

== Special churches ==
The Cathedral is the Cathedral of St. Benedict's Cathedral in Eshowe. The Diocese have 4 Deaneries, they are all made up to the total number of 34 parishes.

== Leadership ==
- Prefect Apostolic of Zululand (Roman rite)
  - Bishop Thomas Spreiter, O.S.B. (1921-08-27 – 1923-12-11 see below)
- Vicars Apostolic of Eshowe (Roman rite)
  - Bishop Thomas Spreiter, O.S.B. (see above 1923-12-11 – 1943-05-14)
  - Bishop Aurelian Bilgeri, O.S.B. (1947-06-12 – 1951-01-11 see below)
- Bishops of Eshowe (Roman rite)
  - Bishop Aurelian Bilgeri, O.S.B. (see above 1951-01-11 – 1973-07-24)
  - Bishop Mansuet Dela Biyase (1975-02-28 – 2005-06-26)
  - Bishop Xolelo Thaddaeus Kumalo (11 March 2008 - 25 November 2020)
  - Archbishop Wilfrid Napier, Apostolic Administrator (since 24 January 2021)

== See also ==
- Catholic Church in South Africa
