= Diocese of Umtata (Catholic) =

Latin Catholic diocese in South Africa

Coordinates: 31°34′S 28°46′E

Diocese of Umtata Dioecesis Umtatana

Location
- Country: South Africa
- Metropolitan: Durban

Statistics
- Area: 22,500 km^{2} (8,700 sq mi)
- Population: Total; Catholics: (as of 2004); 1,717,676; 68,198 (4.0%)

Information
- Denomination: Catholic Church
- Sui iuris church: Latin Church
- Rite: Roman Rite

Current leadership
- Pope: Leo XIV
- Bishop: Anton Sipuka

The Diocese of Umtata (Latin: Umtatan(a)) is a Latin Catholic diocese located in the city of Umtata, King Sabata Dalindyebo Local Municipality, in the ecclesiastical province of Durban in South Africa.

== History ==
- 30 March 1930: Established as Apostolic Prefecture of Umtata from the Apostolic Vicariate of Mariannhill
- 12 April 1937: Promoted as Apostolic Vicariate of Umtata
- 11 January 1951: Promoted as Diocese of Umtata

== Special churches ==
The Cathedral is the Cathedral of All Saints in Umtata.

== Leadership ==
- Prefects Apostolic of Umtata (Roman rite)
  - Fr. Daniele Kauczor, M.C.C.I. (1923 – 1926)
  - Fr. Luigi Mohn, M.C.C.I. (1926.12.10 – 1930)
  - Fr. Emanuele Hanisch, M.H.M. (1930.10.28 – 1937.04.13 see below)
- Vicars Apostolic of Umtata (Roman rite)
  - Bishop Emanuele Hanisch, M.H.M. (see above 1937.04.13 – 1940.02.28)
  - Bishop Joseph Grueter, C.M.M. (1941.04.03 – 1951.01.11 see below)
- Bishops of Umtata (Roman rite)
  - Bishop Joseph Grueter, C.M.M. (see above 1951.01.11 – 1968.09.26)
  - Bishop Ernst Heinrich Karlen, C.M.M. (1968.09.26 – 1974.05.09), appointed Bishop of Bulawayo, Zimbabwe; future Archbishop
  - Bishop Peter Fanyana John Butelezi, O.M.I. (1975.07.10 – 1978.04.27), appointed Archbishop of Bloemfontein
  - Bishop Andrew Zolile T. Brook (1979.02.12 – 1995.01.07)
  - Bishop Oswald Georg Hirmer (1997.04.21 – 2008.02.08)
  - Bishop Anton Sipuka (since 2008.02.08)

== See also ==
- Catholic Church in South Africa

== Sources ==
- GCatholic.org
- Catholic Hierarchy
