= St. Sebastian Church, Papanasam =

Shrine of St. Sebastian, Papanasam
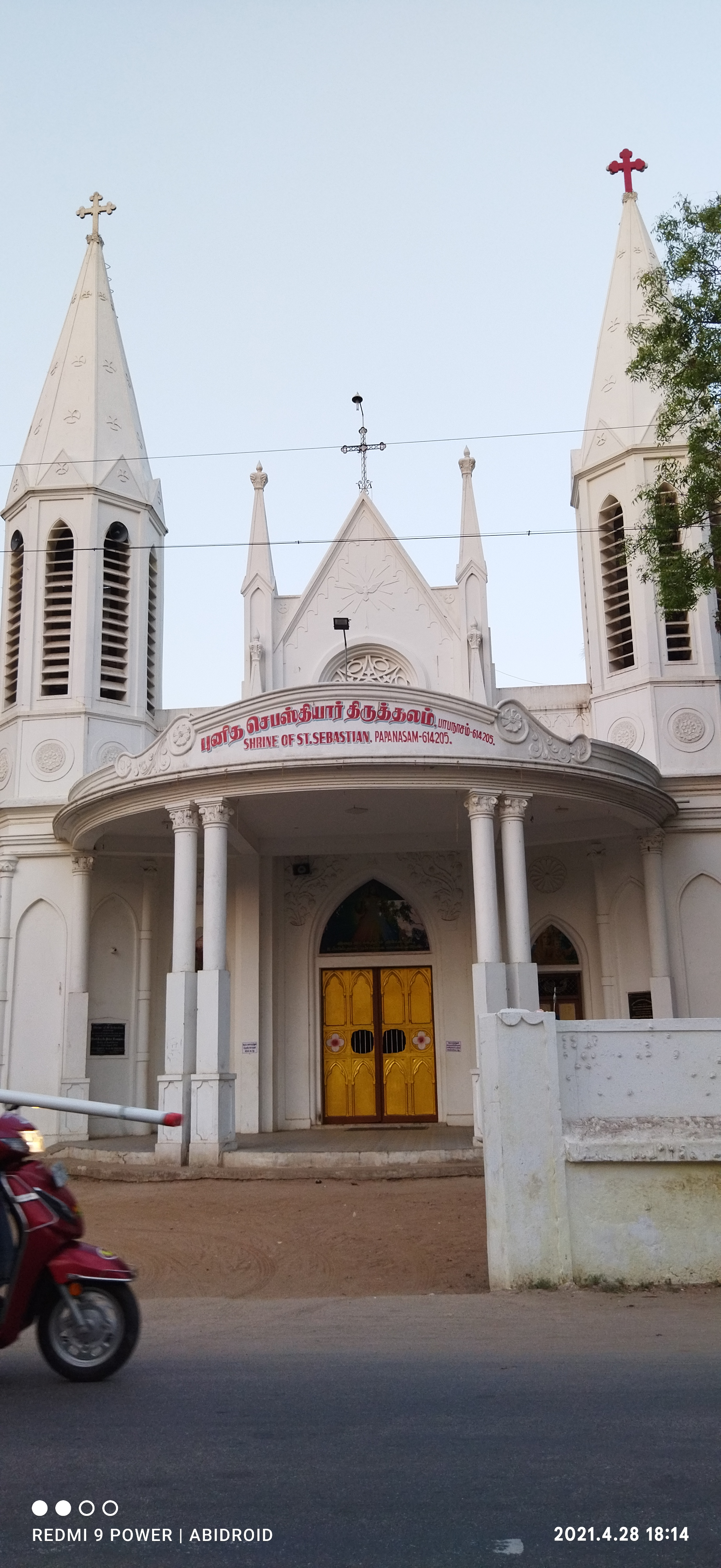
- Location: Papanasam, Tamil Nadu
- Country: India
- Denomination: Roman Catholic

History
- Dedication: St. Sebastian

Architecture
- Functional status: Active

Administration
- District: Thanjavur
- Diocese: Kumbakonam

Clergy
- Bishop(s): Most Rev. Antonisamy Francis, D.D., S.T.L.
- Rector: Rev. Fr. G. Gosman Arockiaraj

Shrine of St. Sebastian is a church in the town of Papanasam in the Thanjavur district of Tamil Nadu, India. It was constructed as a mud church in about 1870 by Fr. Abraham, the parish priest of Thiruvaiyaru. It was renovated by Abraham's successor Gabriel Playoust and consecrated on 20 January 1894. The church is known for the car festival during Easter. The church is a part of the diocese of Kumbakonam. It was bifurcated from the parish of Ayyampettai. Rev. Fr. Cyrian Kappen was the first parish priest. It started functioning as an independent parish from 1933 February 11 onwards.

== See also ==
- Christianity in India
- Christianity in Tamil Nadu
- Roman Catholic Marian churches
- Roman Catholicism in India
- Shrines to the Virgin Mary
- Our Lady of Good Health
- Poondi Matha Basilica(Our Lady of Lourdes Basilica, Poondi), Tamil Nadu, India
- Our Lady of Snows Basilica, Tuticorin, Tamil Nadu, India.
- Kamanayakkanpatti Church of Our Lady of Assumption (பரலோக மாதா திருத்தலம்)
- Our Lady of Snow Kallikulam (Our Lady of Snow Church, Kallikulam), Tamil Nadu, India.

== Gallery ==
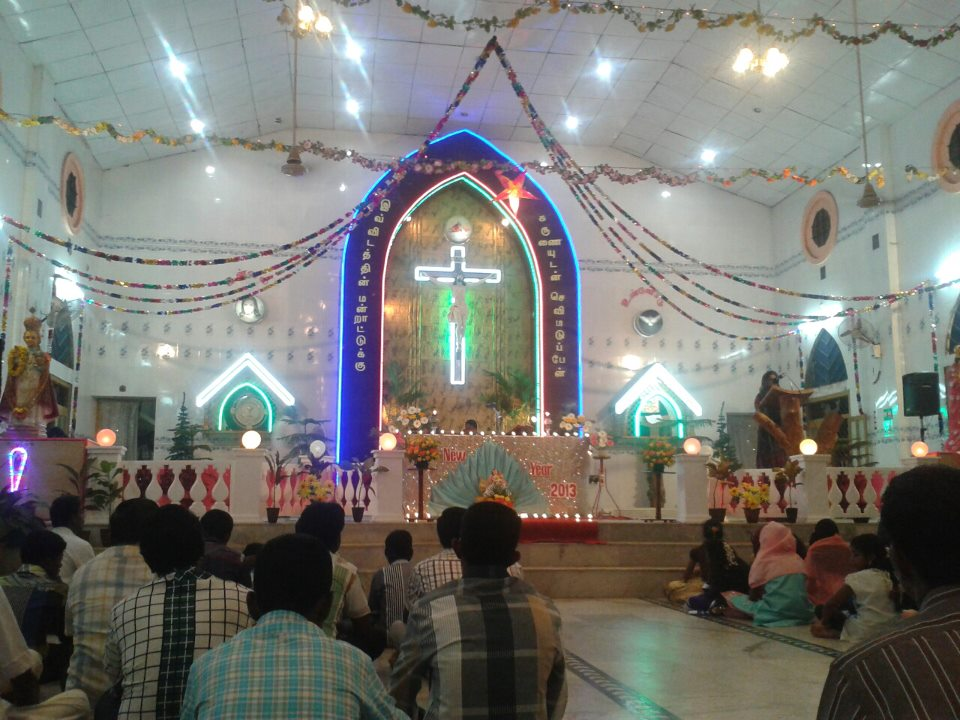
Inner View of St. Sebastian's Shrine

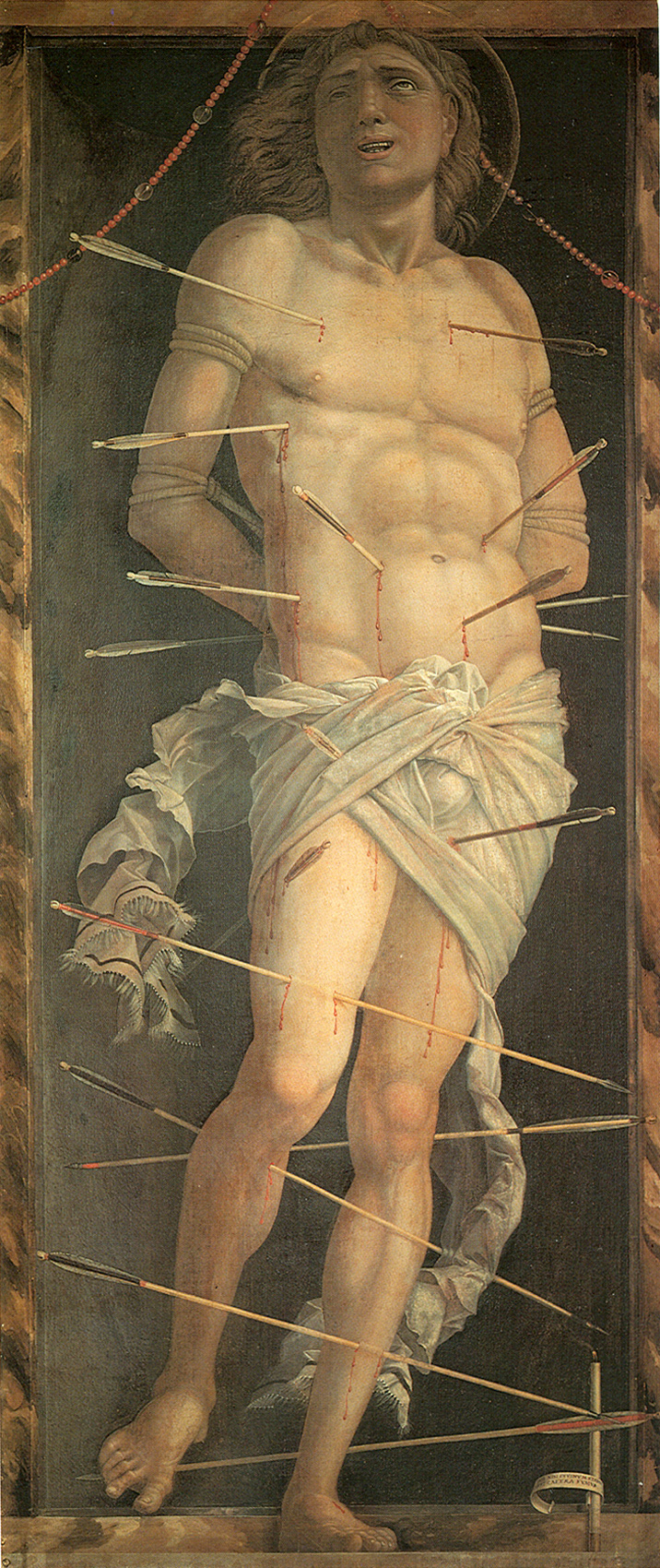
