= Periyanayagi Madha Shrine, Konankuppam =

Roman Catholic church in Tamil Nadu, India

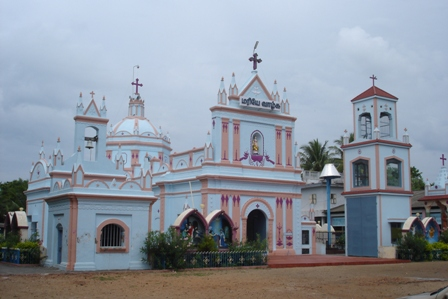
Periya Nayagi Shrine

Periyanayagi Madha shrine is a Roman Catholic church, dedicated to St. Mary, mother of Jesus; constructed by an Italian missionary, Fr. Constantine Beschi, also known under his Tamil name of Vīramāmunivar. It is located at Konankuppam in Cuddalore district of the state of Tamil Nadu, India.

== History ==
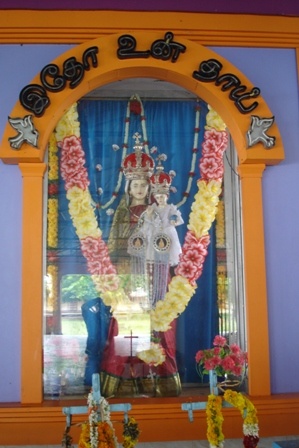
Periya Nayagi

Once Konankuppam was a forest place, where people from Mugasaparur the nearby village brought their flocks for grazing. During the 17th century an Italian missionary, Fr. Beschi, brought two statues of Mother Mary to consecrate at Elakurichi (Thirukavalur), where he worked. Passing through the forest on the way to Elakurichi he felt tired, and fell asleep under a tree. Children who were looking after their cattle nearby playfully hid one of the statues behind a bush. Fr. Beschi was upset to discover that a statue was missing and went on sadly.

A childless man called Kachirayar lived in MugasaParur (M. Parur). One day a lady (Mother Mary) appeared to him in a dream. The lady called Kachirayar by name. She told him she was alone in the forest and asked him to find the statue and build a chapel at that place. If he did this, she said, he would be blessed with a child. Kachirayar searched for the statue and found it in a bush. With the help of villagers, he built a chapel on the spot. The miracle happened as he had dreamt: his wife gave birth to a child.

Later Fr. Beschi happened to hear about the miracle, came to Konankuppam and saw the small chapel built for the Mother Mary statue he lost. He was very much delighted and decided to stay at Konankuppam while continuing his work in the Tamil. He constructed the shrine with the help of Kachirayar which exists today. It is said to have been the first place of worship he erected and when it was completed he went to Madras and asked the Bishop of Mylapore to procure for him a statue from Manila, an image of the Virgin in the native dress of Tamil Nadu and bearing the child Jesus in her arms, fashioned after a model he had made. The image eventually arrived and was set up in the church, were remains today.

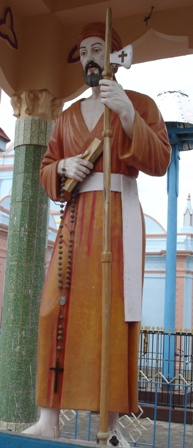
Fr. Beschi

There is a life size statue of Fr. Beschi in the front of the church. An annual festival to commemorate the Madonna of the shrine begins on 14 January with a flag raising, and ends on 23 January with the procession of a decorated car.

== See also ==
- Poondi Matha Basilica
- Our Lady of Snows Basilica
- Elakurichi
- Basilica of the Holy Redeemer, Tiruchirappalli
