= Basilica of Our Lady of Lourdes, Poondi =

Catholic pilgrimage centre in Tamil Nadu, South India

Poondi Madha Basilica
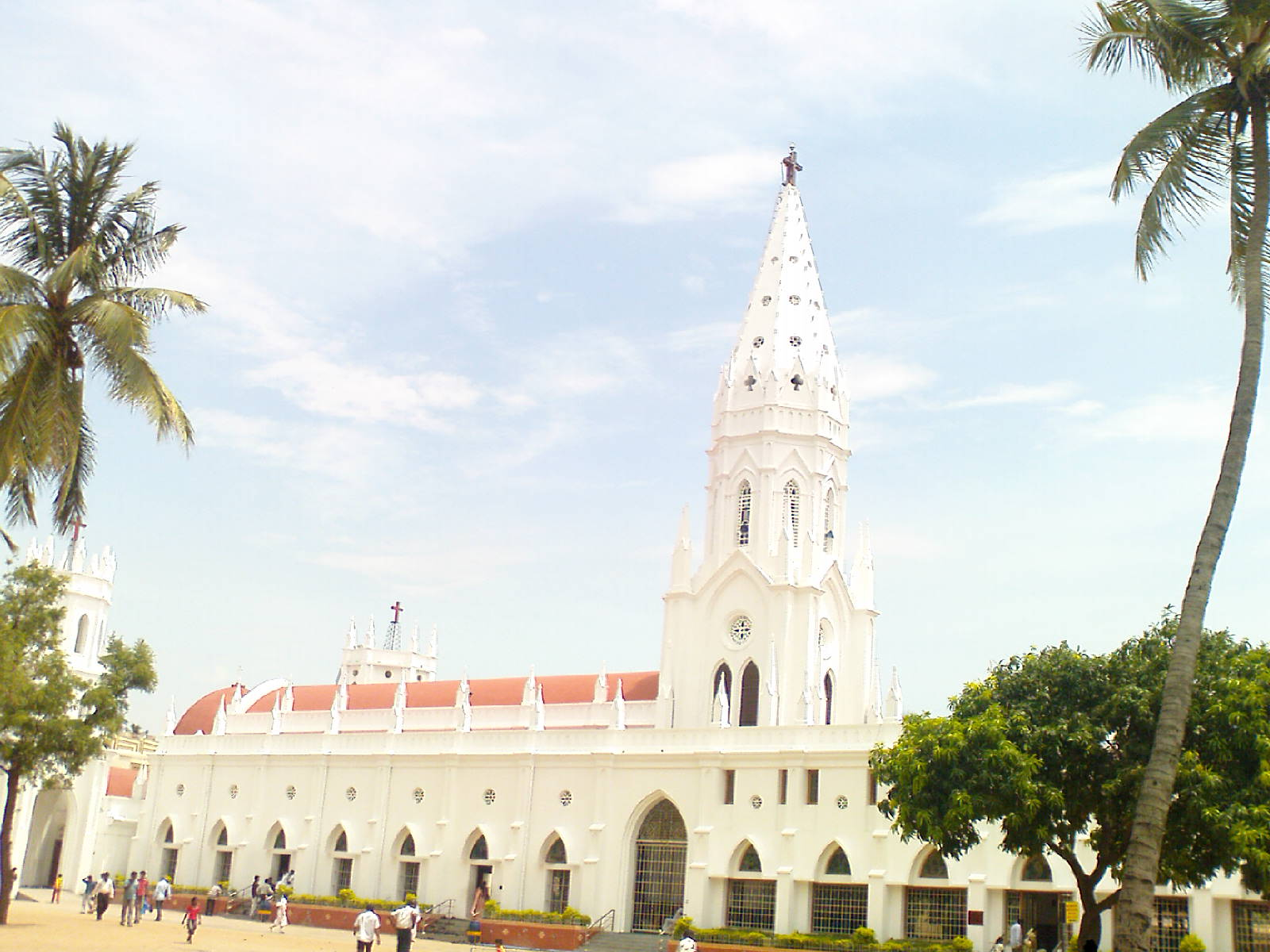

Religion
- Affiliation: Roman Catholic
- Ecclesiastical or organizational status: Minor Basilica
- Year consecrated: Eighteenth century beginning

Location
- Location: Alamelupuram-Poondi, Tamil Nadu, India
- Interactive map of Poondi Madha Basilica
- Coordinates: 10°51′50.4″N 78°56′29.0″E

Architecture
- Style: Gothic and French architecture

Website
- https://poondimadhabasilica.org

Basilica of Our Lady of Lourdes, also known as Poondi Madha Basilica, is a Catholic pilgrimage centre located in Tamil Nadu, South India. It is located in Alamelupuram-Poondi, a small village located adjacent to Thirukattupalli in Thiruvaiyaru taluk of Thanjavur district. The shrine was consecrated as a Minor Basilica in 1999 by Pope John Paul II.

== History ==
Cardinal Duraisamy Simon Lourdusamy declared the Shrine of Our Lady of Poondi as a permanent pilgrimage centre of Our Lady of Immaculate Conception. On 3 August 1999, the shrine was declared as Minor Basilica by Pope John Paul II.

== Shrine ==
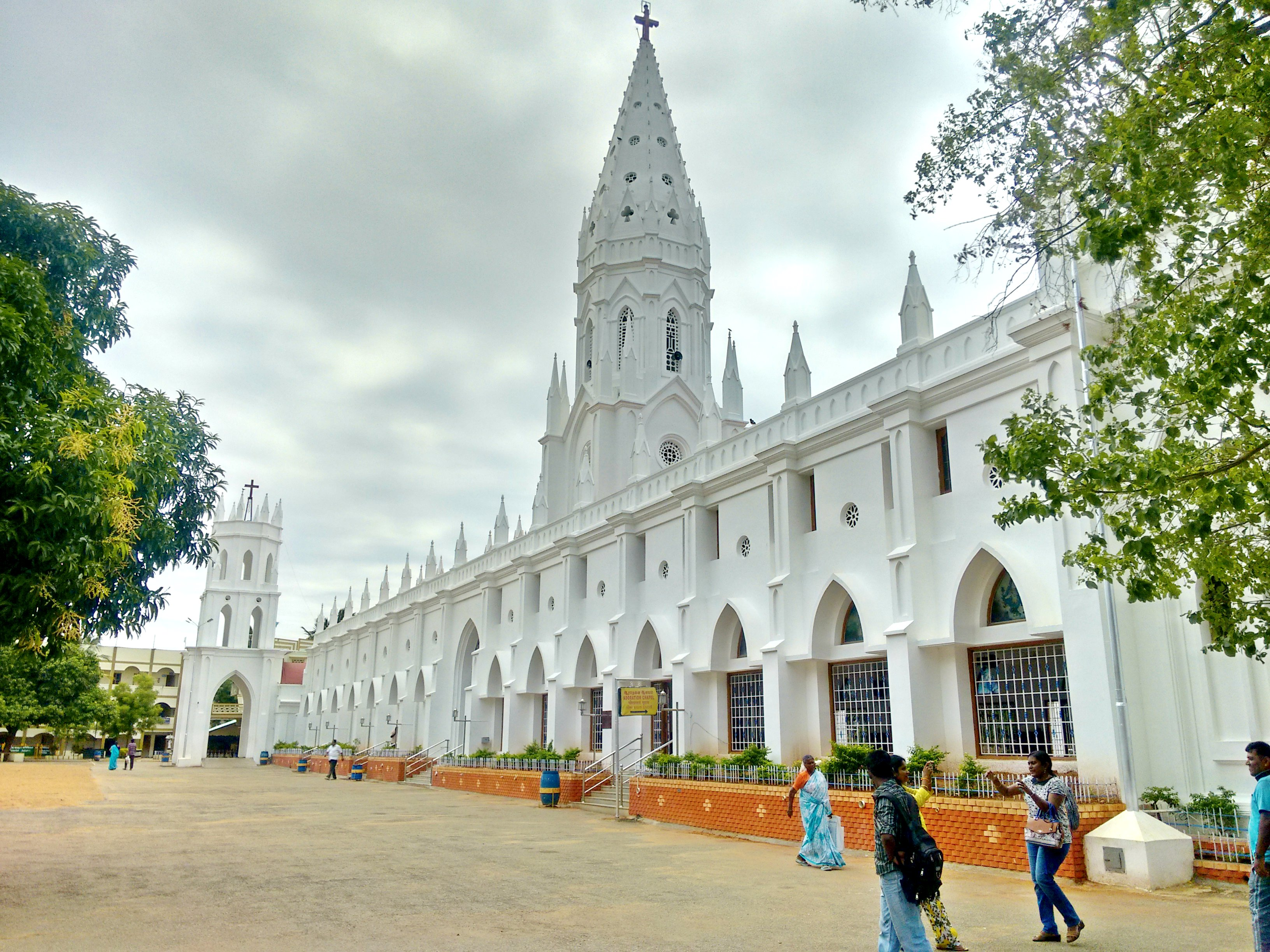
Poondi Church Side View

The present structure of the shrine has a mixture of Gothic and French architectural styles. The facade above the portico has a row of statues of the Twelve Apostles, St. Francis Xavier and Fr. Constantine Joseph Beschi. The church has a relic of the True Cross, believed to be the one on which Christ was crucified.

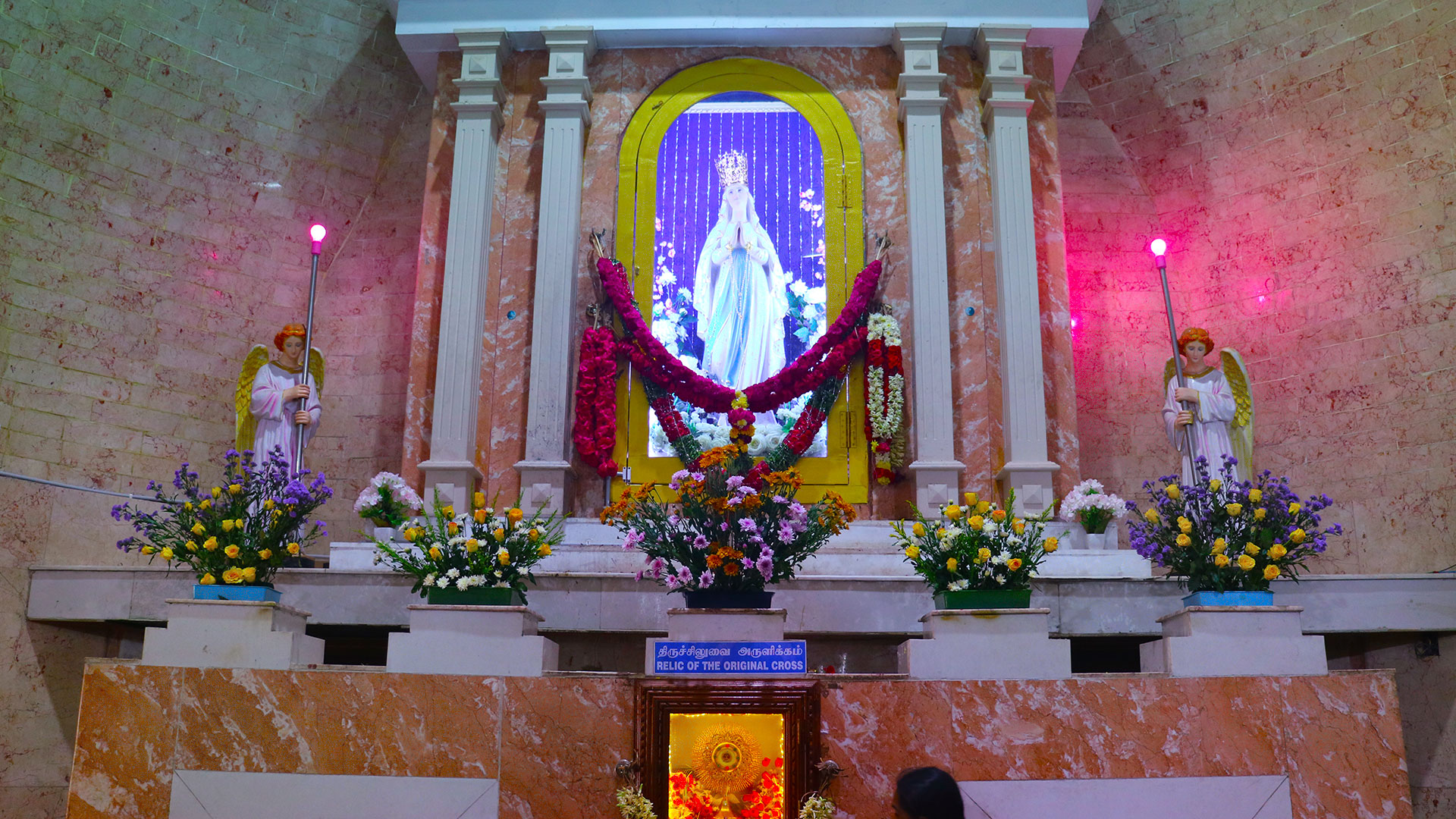

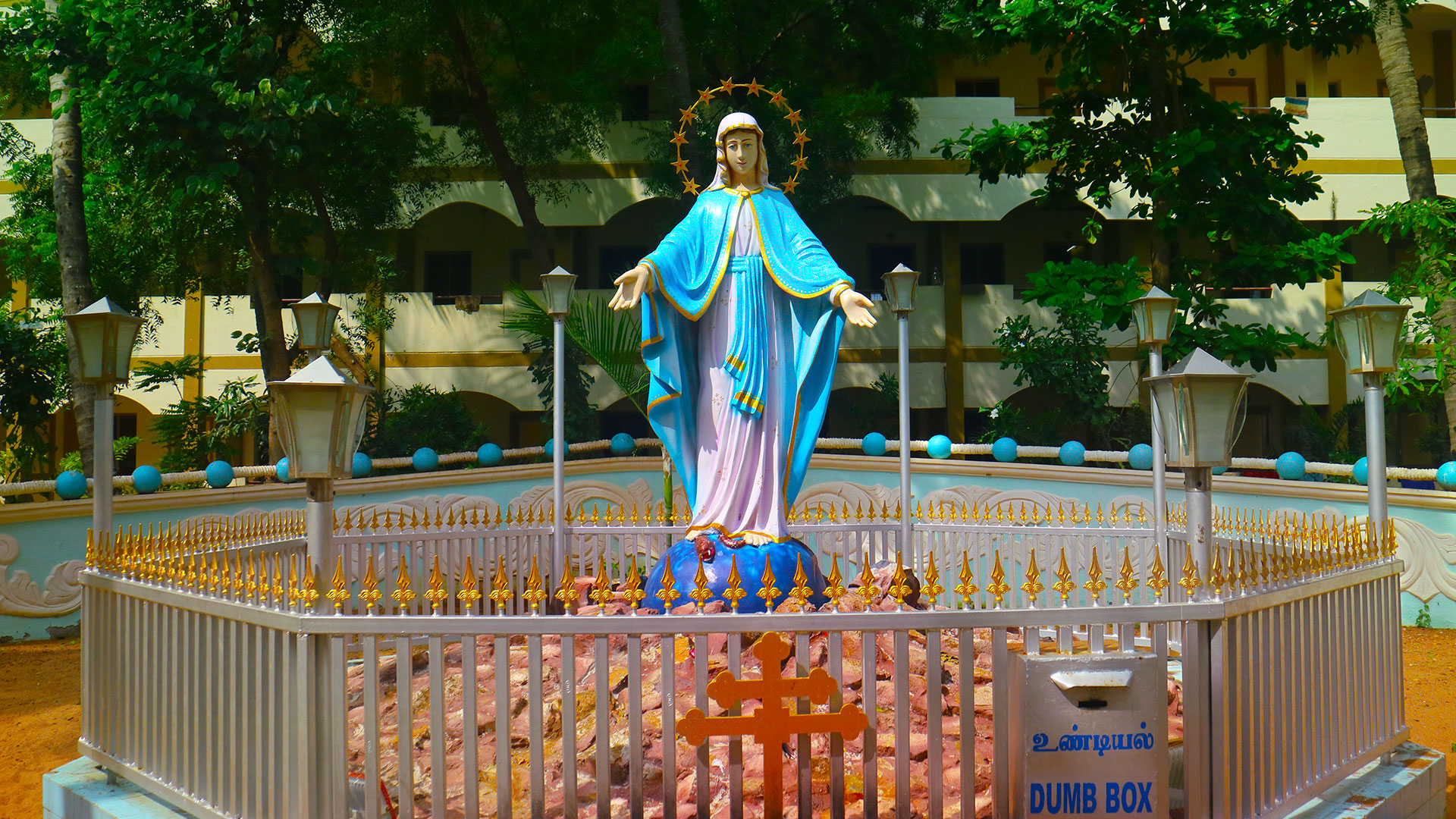

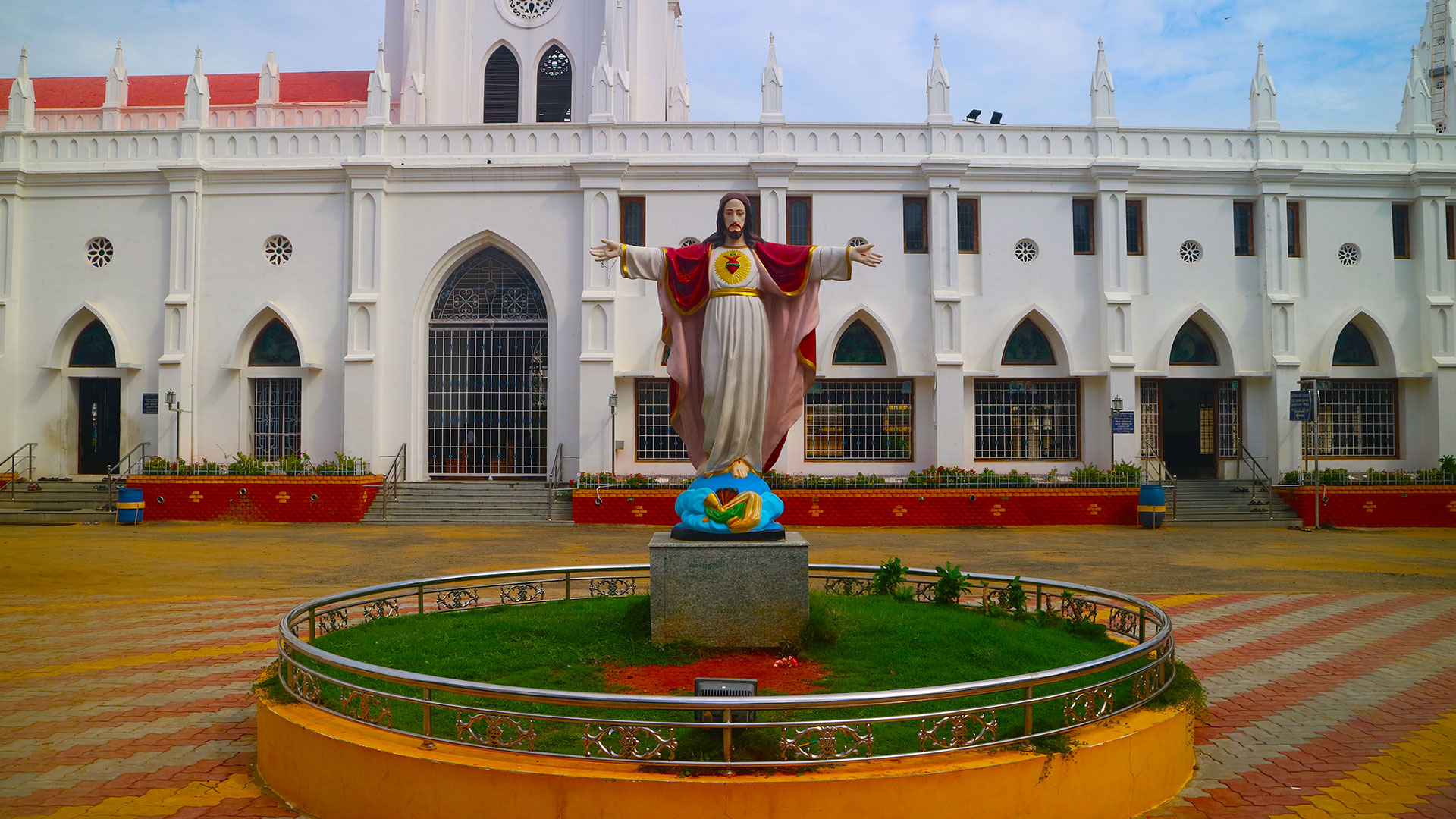

== Gallery ==
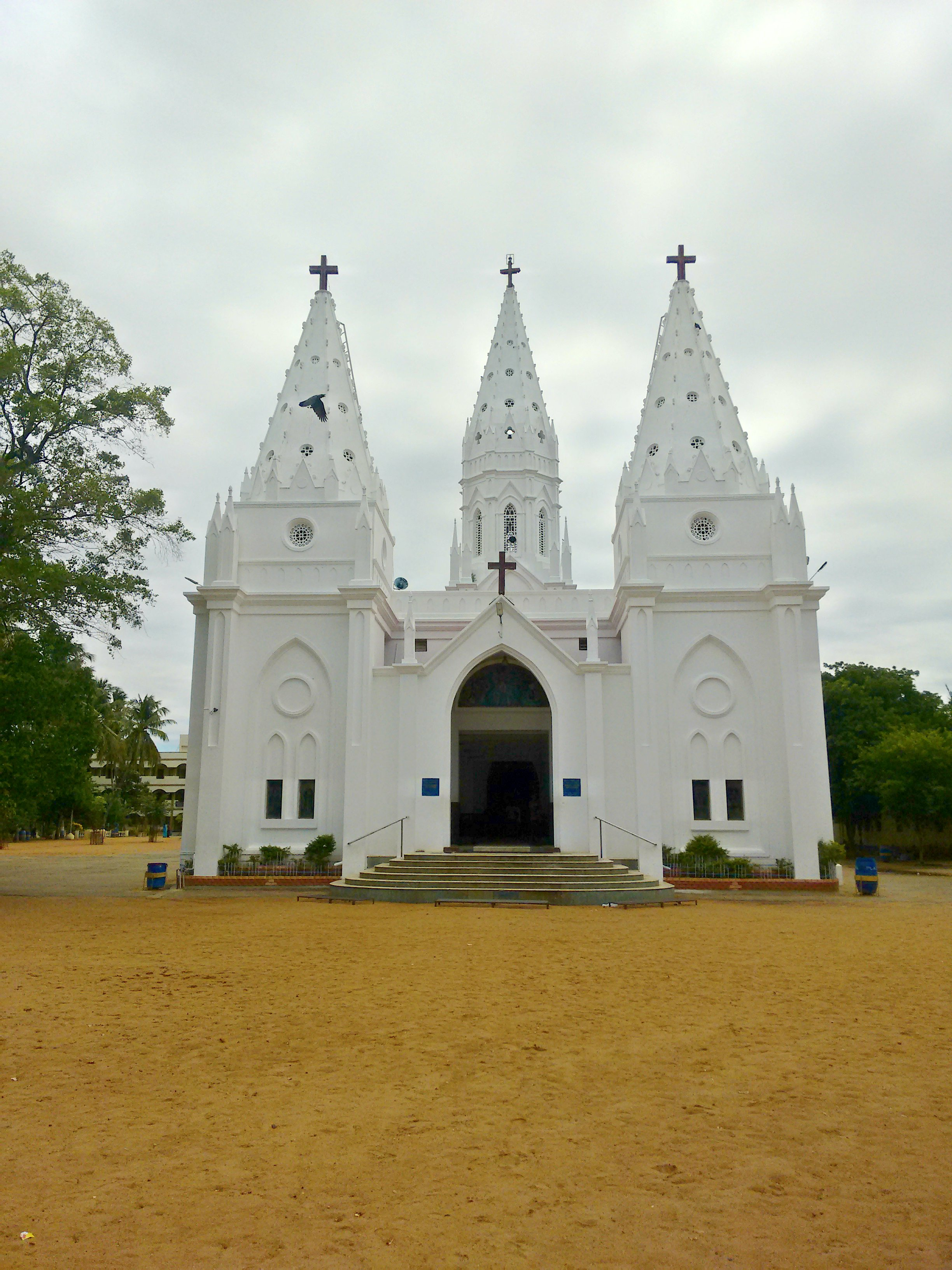
Poondi Basilica View

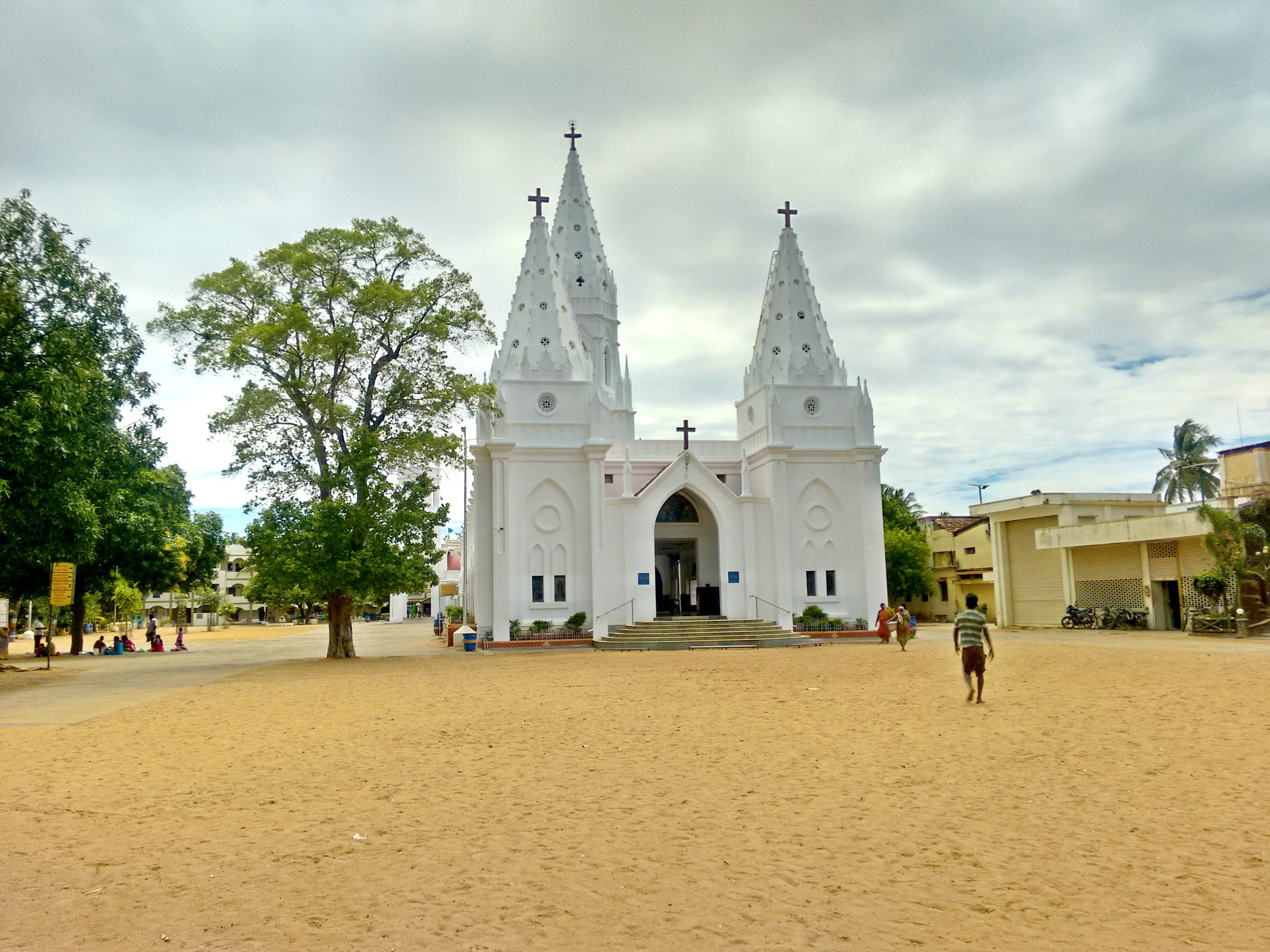
Poondi Basilica pleasant View

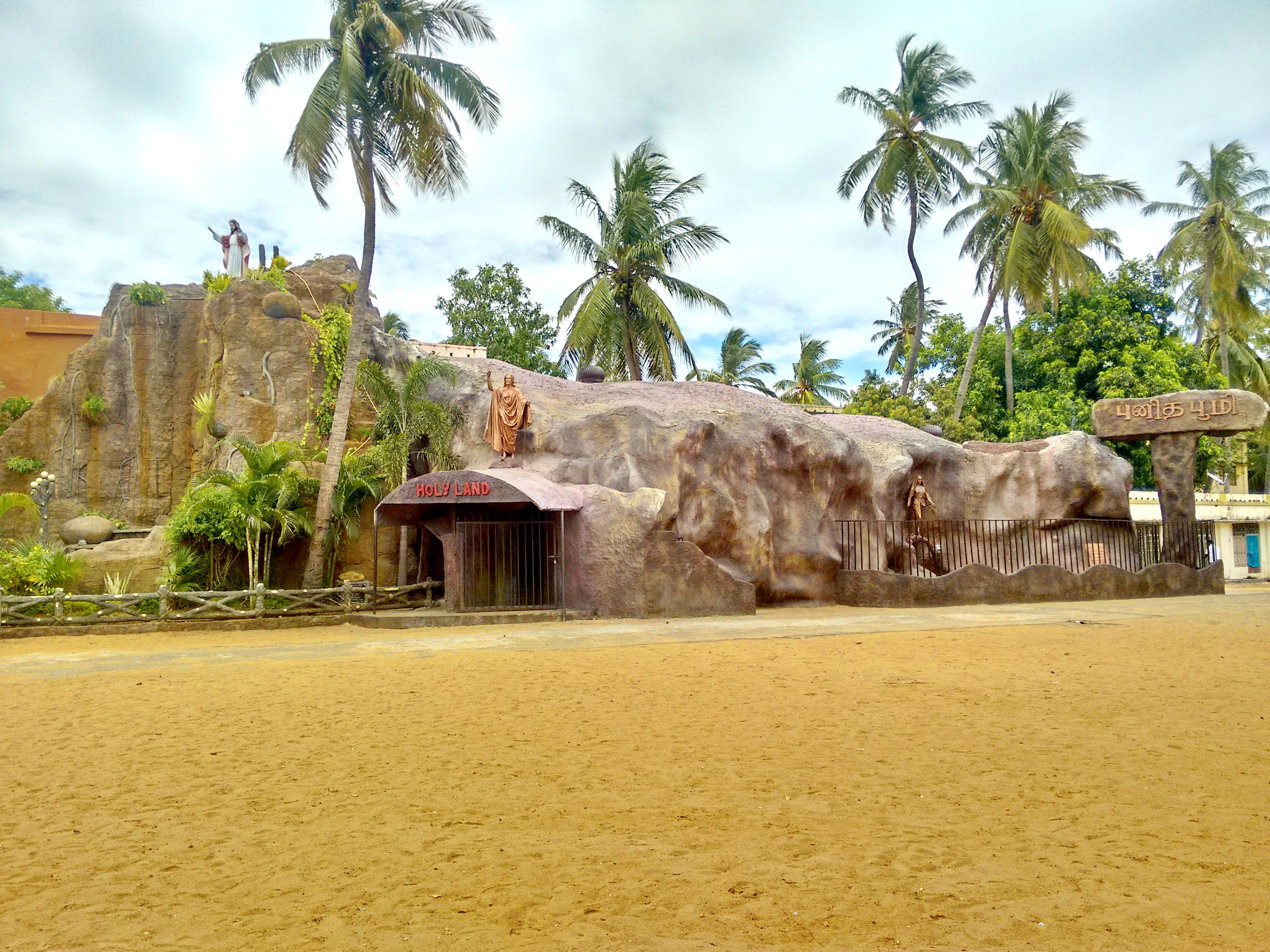
Holy Land Gallery in Poondi

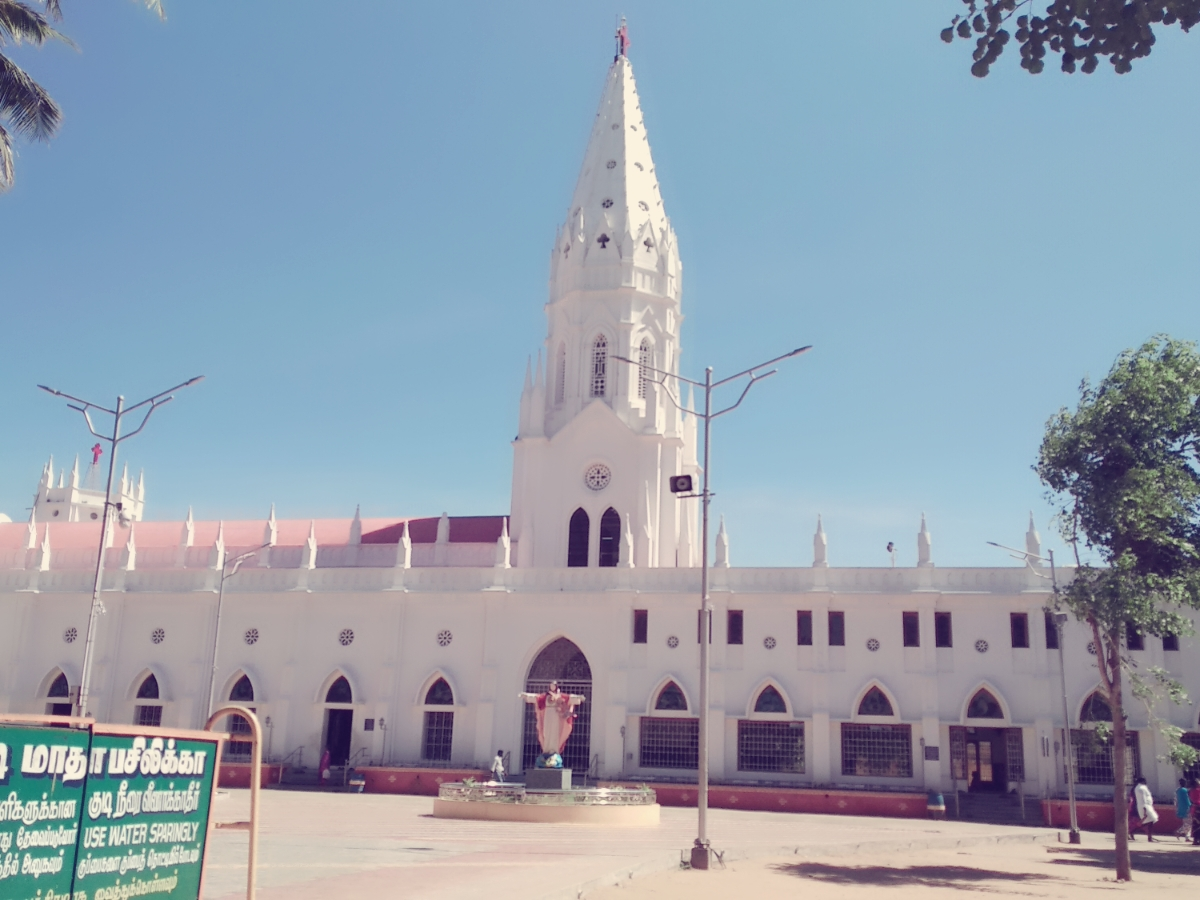

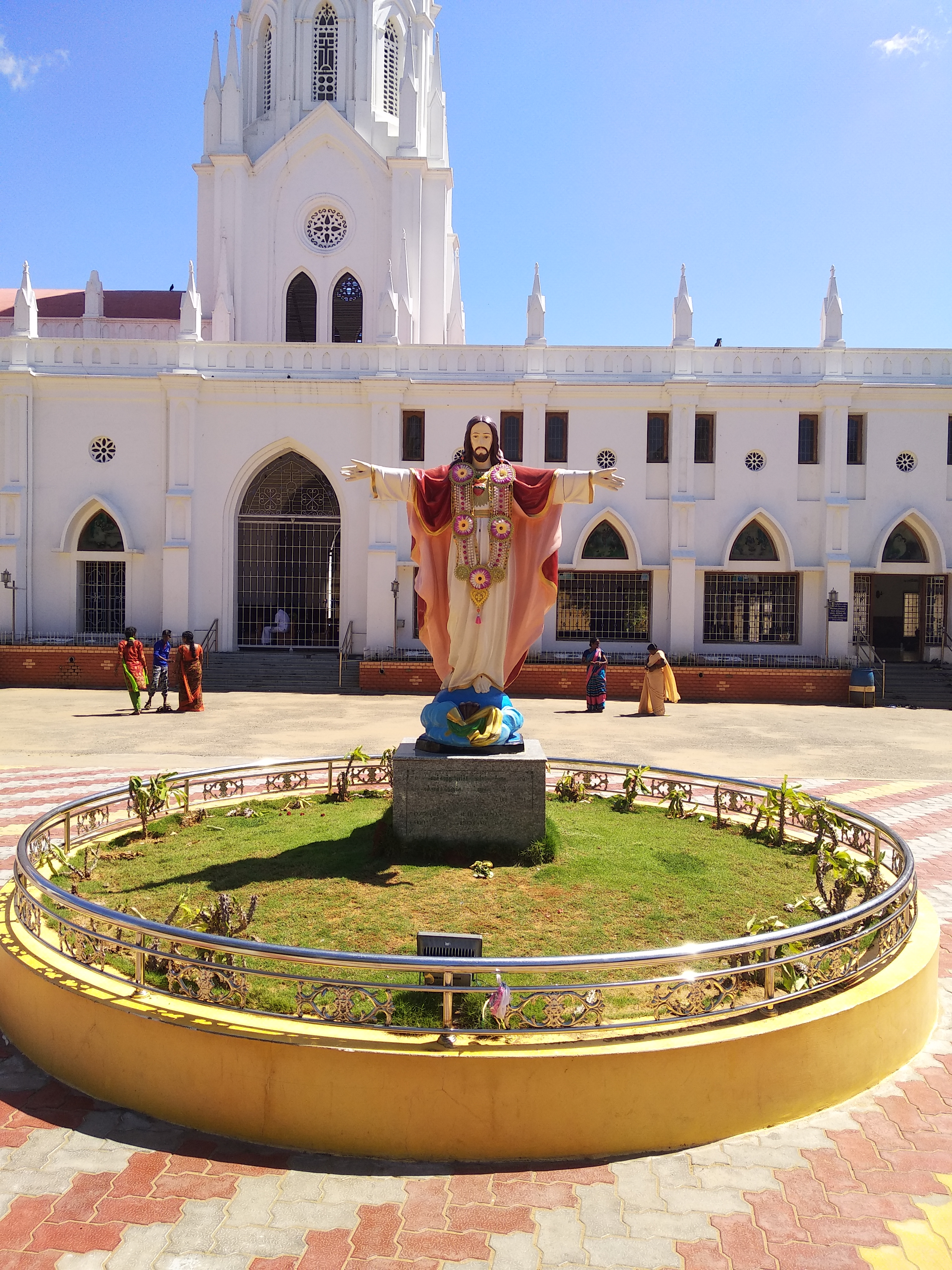

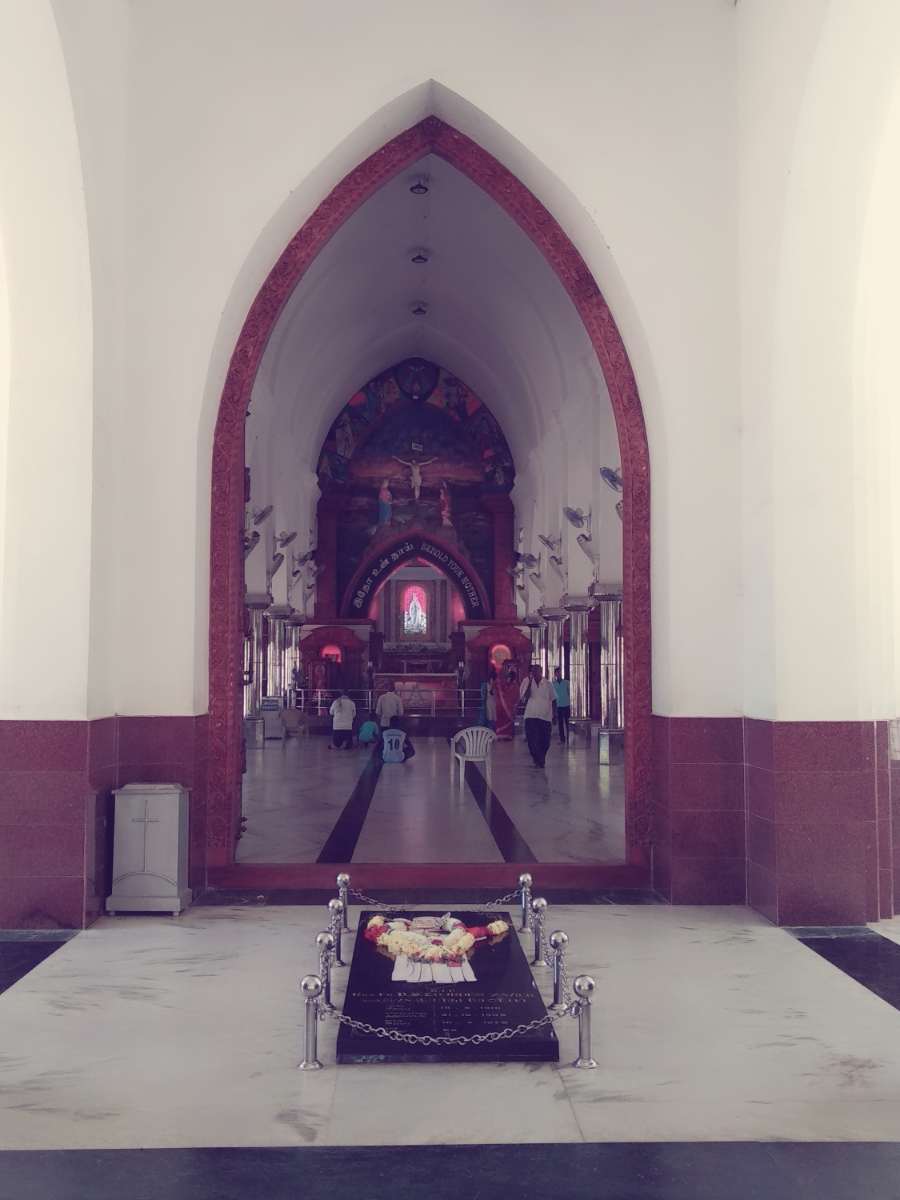

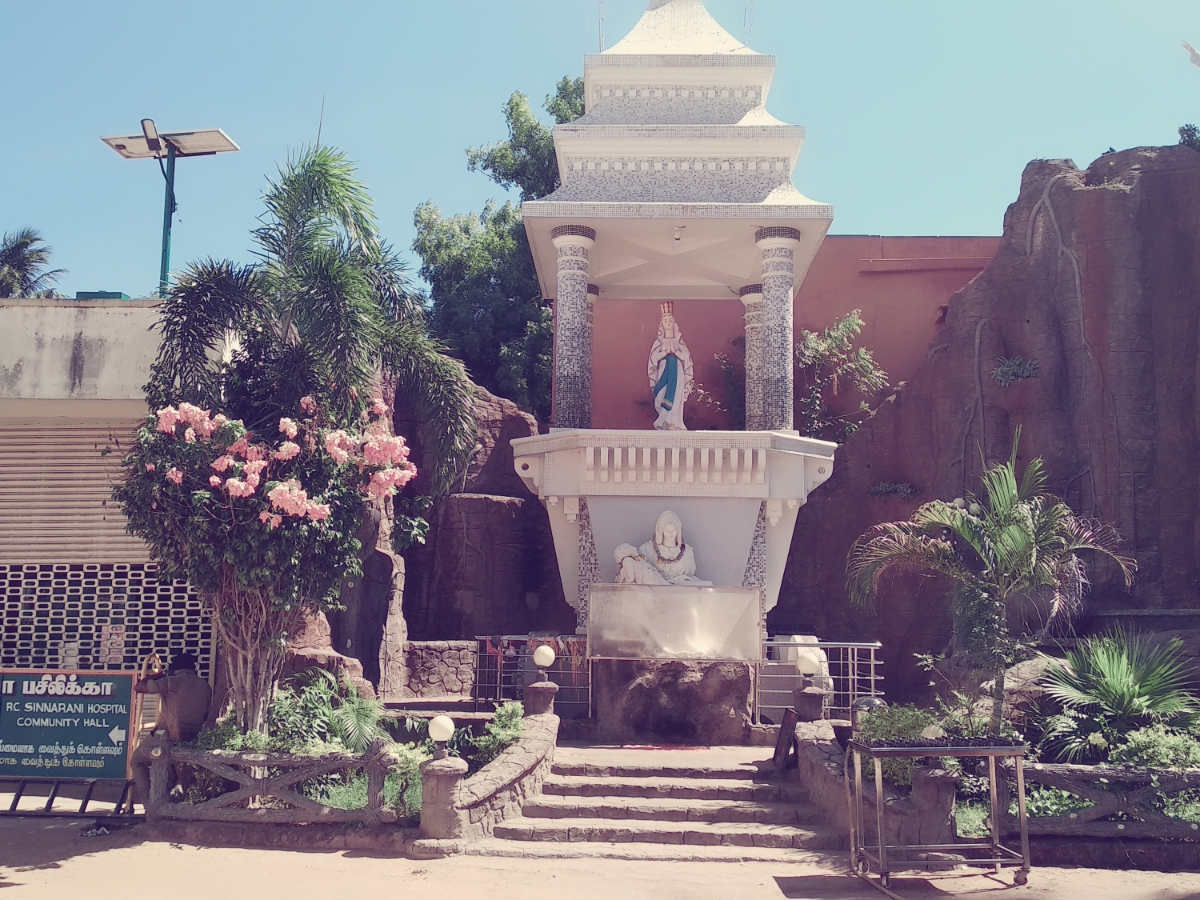

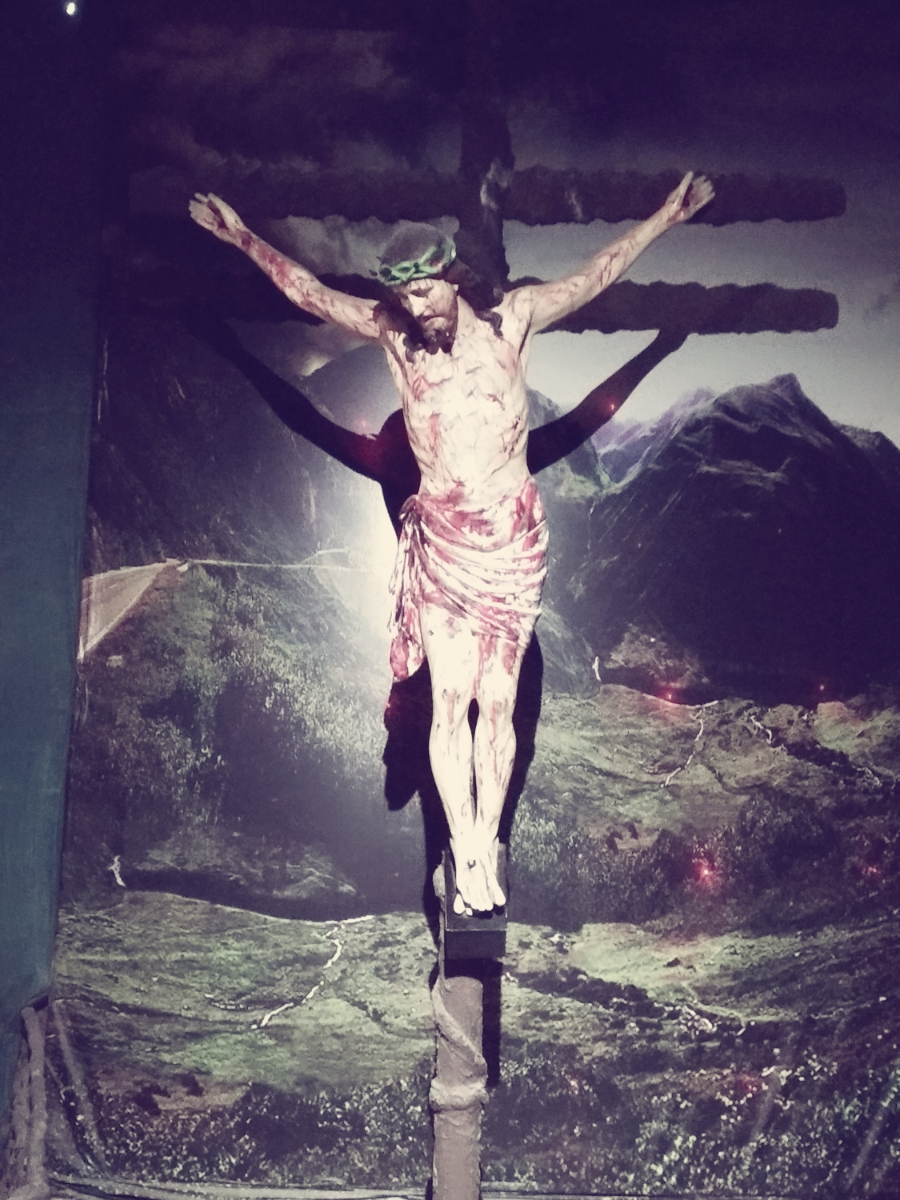

== See also ==
- Basilica of Our Lady of Good Health
- Elakurichi
- Kamanayakkanpatti
- Konankuppam
- Our Lady of Snow Kallikulam
- Our Lady of Snows Basilica
- The Perianayagi Madha Shrine – Roman Catholic church in Tamil Nadu, India
- Villianoor – Human settlement in India
