= Adaikkala Madha Shrine, Elakurichi =

Catholic church in Elakurichi, India

Coordinates: 10°57′40″N 79°09′49″E

Our Lady of Refuge Church, Elakurichi
- அடைக்கல அன்னை ஆலயம், ஏலக்குறிச்சி

Religion
- Affiliation: Roman Catholic
- Ecclesiastical or organizational status: Shrine
- Year consecrated: Eighteenth century beginning

Location
- Location: Elakurichi, Ariyalur, Tamil Nadu, India
- Interactive map of Our Lady of Refuge Church, Elakurichi

Architecture
- Style: Gothic and French architecture

Website
- https://www.adaikalamadha.org/

Adaikala Madha Shrine, Elakurichi is a Catholic church located in the village of Elakurichi near Ariyalur, Tamil Nadu, India. The church is dedicated to Our Lady of Refuge, also known as Adaikkala Madha in the Tamil language.

== History ==
The church was built in the 18th century by French Missionary Constanzo Beschi, popularly known as Veeramamunivar in Tamil. The current structure of the church was rebuilt in 1971. The church has a unique blend of Indian and European architectural styles.

== Madha Kulam (Sacred Pond) ==
King of Ariyalur Arengappa Malavarayar affected with an incurable cancerous mole (Raja Pilavai) approached veeramamunivar to heal him.

Munivar knowing fully well his inability to do so, sought the refuge of Mother Mary. Heeding the prayers, our blessed mother brought forth a miraculous spring like in Lourdes.

He applied the soil mixed with the spring water on the incurable mole. On the very same night, he got cured. In order to thank for the favors received the king donated 175 Acres of land on which stands the present shrine.

== Devotional activities ==
The shrine is famous for its annual feast, which is held on the first Saturday and Sunday of December. Thousands of pilgrims from all over the state and the country come to the shrine to participate in the celebrations. The feast is a time of great joy and devotion, with many people offering prayers and performing various acts of devotion.

== See also ==
- Roman Catholicism in India
- Christianity in India
- Christianity in Tamil Nadu
