= Constanzo Beschi =

Italian Jesuit priest, missionary and Tamil language littérateur

Servant of God Constantine Joseph Beschi
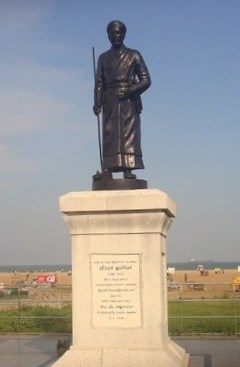
- Veeramamunivar statue at the Marina Beach, Chennai

Personal life
- Born: 8 November 1680 Castiglione delle Stiviere, Duchy of Mantua
- Died: 4 February 1747, Kingdom of Cochin, Sampaloor , Chalakudy , Thrissur Kerala
- Resting place: St Francis Xavier's Church, Sampaloor, Kerala
- Other name: வீரமாமுனிவர் (Veeramamunivar)

Religious life
- Religion: Christianity

Constantine Joseph Beschi (8 November 1680 – 4 February 1747), also known under his Tamil name of Vīramāmunivar, was an Italian Jesuit priest, missionary in South India, and Tamil language littérateur.

He is venerated as a Servant of God in the Catholic Church.

== Early years ==
Born in Castiglione delle Stiviere, in the district of Mantua, in Italy, on 8 November 1680, Beschi got his secondary education in the Jesuits' High School at Mantua, which taught rhetoric, humanities and grammar. After becoming a Jesuit in 1698, he was trained in Ravenna and Bologna, studying philosophy for three years from 1701–1703 in Bologna, and theology for four years from 1706–1710. His studies also included Latin, French, Portuguese, Greek, and Hebrew. He was ordained as a priest in 1709. On hearing about the work done in India by the Jesuits returning to Italy from India, Beschi was eager to come to India. He requested and obtained permission from Superior General Michelangelo Tamburini to be sent to the Jesuit mission at Madurai in South India. Sailing from Lisbon he reached Goa in October 1710, from where he proceeded immediately to South India. He arrived in Madurai in May 1711.

== In South India ==
Inspired by what was done in China, Beschi adopted the native Tamilians' lifestyle in his life and in his missionary work. For example, he adopted the saffron coloured robe generally worn by a sannyasi (Indian ascetic). He visited several important centres such as Tirunelveli, Ramanathapuram, Thanjavur, and Madurai to learn the Tamil language. He met with persecution in 1714–15 and escaped a death sentence. This gave him more time to master the Tamil language in which he soon showed great proficiency. Because of his boldness in defending the correctness of his convictions, he was fondly called Dhairiyanathar (The Fearless Guru).

During the first six years, he worked as a missionary in Elakurichy, a town near Tiruvaiyaru, Ariyalur district. Then he served as parish priest in Kamanayakkanpatti, one of the oldest Christian communities in Tamil Nadu. He worked in the Thanjavur area till 1738 and settled in 1740 on the Coromandel coast where he remained till the end of his life.

He helped build the Poondi Matha Basilica at Poondi near Thanjavur, Vyagula Matha Church at Thanjavur, The Perianayagi Madha Shrine, Konankuppam at Mugasaparur in Konankuppam, and Adaikala Maadha Shrine at Elakurichi. These churches are now Catholic pilgrim centres.

He died at Sampaloor in Ambalakaadu in Thrissur, Kingdom of Cochin (now a part of the state of Kerala), and is buried at St. Francis Xavier's Church, Sampaloor, where his tomb can be seen. Robert Caldwell, one of the eminent Tamil linguists and historians, in his book 'A Political and General History of Tinnevelly (Tirunelveli) in the Presidency of Madras: From the Earliest Period to the Cession to the English Government in AD 1801' opines that, based on the writings of his biographer and the letters written to Europe at the same time, "It is certain from authentic records that Beschi was "Rector" of Manapar (present Manapad) in 1744 and that he died there in 1746. This was in the 66th year of his age and the 40th of his residence in India. It is very probable that Manapar was the first place in the Tamil country where Beschi resided after he left Goa, in consequence of which he might naturally wish to end his days there." He, in the same book (page 243) further states that his body was laid in rest in the oldest church of Manapad which has been now completely buried in the sand.

== Contribution to Tamil literature ==
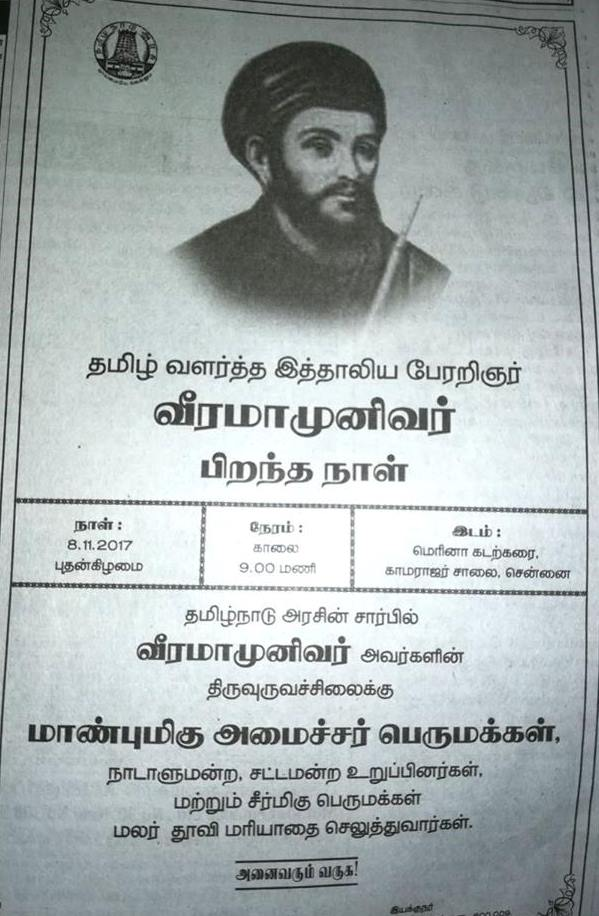
TamilNadu government's paper advertisement paying homage to Veeramamunivar

Constantine compiled the first Tamil lexicon - a Tamil-Latin dictionary. He also compiled the comprehensive Chaturakarati (சதுரகராதி), a quadruple lexicon containing words, synonyms, and categories of words and rhymes. Beschi also composed two other Tamil grammars and three dictionaries, covering Tamil-Latin, Tamil-Portuguese and Tamil-Tamil.

He translated and explained in Latin the "Thirukkural", an epic poem of Thiruvalluvar. This Latin work was an eye opener for European intellectuals, enabling them to discover truth and beauty in Tamil literature. He also translated into European languages several other important Tamil literary works such as Devaaram (தேவாரம்), Thiruppugazh (திருப்புகழ்), Nannool (நன்னூல்) and Aaththichoodi (ஆத்திசூடி).

Besides composing literary Tamil Grammar work, he also wrote a grammar for the common use of Tamil (Urai nadai illakkiyam - உரை நடை இலக்கியம்), which at times led to him being referred to as the 'Father of Tamil Prose'.

Earlier Tamil scripts were written without the tittle (புள்ளி) for consonants, and the symbol ர was used to indicate long vowels. It was Veeramamunivar who introduced the system of dotting the Tamil consonants (க், ங், ச், ... ) and writing the long vowels as ஆ instead of அர, கா instead of கர, etc.

His biggest poetical work is the Thembavani (தேம்பாவணி - The Unfading Garland - an ornament of poems as sweet as honey), 3615 stanzas long on salvation history and the life of Saint Joseph. It was presented for ratification as a classic in the Academy of Poets and received their approval and the poet was given the title Vīramāmunivar (வீரமாமுனிவர் - Courageous, Great Ascetic). Some of his earlier works are lost or dispersed. including a historical and epic treatise called Tirukovalur Puranakadhai (திருக்கோவலூர் புராணக்கதை). His notable surviving works are, a prabandham (a minor literature) called Kaavalur Kalambagam (காவலூர் கலம்பகம்), a grammatical treatise called Thonnool (தொன்னூல்), a guide book for catechists with the title Vedhiyar Ozukkam (வேதியர் ஒழுக்கம்), and Paramarthaguruvin Kadhai (பரமார்த்த குருவின் கதை - The Adventures of Guru Paramartha), a satirical piece on a naive religious teacher and his equally obtuse disciples. His prose works include polemical writings against the Lutheran missionaries and didactic religious books for the instruction of Catholics.

== Recognition ==
In 1968, the State of Tamil Nadu erected a statue for Beschi on the Marina beach in the city of Madras as a recognition for his contribution to Tamil language and literature.

A tablet was installed in his native place Castiglione delle Stiviere in 1980 to mark the 300th birth anniversary of Beschi. In it, it is mentioned that Beschi is called the Dante of the Tamil language.

The fifth world Tamil Congress held at Madurai in January 1981 erected his statue in the city of Madras.

While in India, he studied the languages of Tamil, Sanskrit, Telugu, and Urdu, though he was best skilled at Tamil and he liked Tamil Nadu the best .

On 3 August 2025, Beschi was formally declared as “the Servant of God”.

== See also ==
- Robert Caldwell
- William Tobias Ringeltaube
