= Konankuppam =

- Village
- Location within Tamil Nadu Location within India
- Coordinates: 11°36′N 79°15′E
- Country: India
- State: Tamil Nadu
- District: Cuddalore

Konankuppam is a small village situated in the Cuddalore district of Tamil Nadu in India. It is the place where Rev. Fr. Joseph Beschi, also famously known as Veeramamunivar, wrote the Thembavani in Tamil.

== Perianayagi Madha ==
=== History ===
The Periya Nayagi Shrine was constructed by the great missionary Constanzo Beschi.

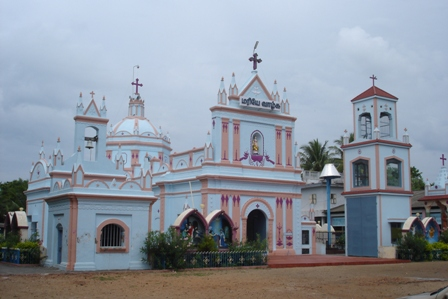
Periya Nayagi Shrine

The place where the shrine is located was once a forest place in Mugasaparur at Konankuppam. People used to come here for feeding their flocks. There were many trees and bushes here. In the 17th century, the Italian priest and a great missionary, Fr. Beschi, brought two statues of Mother Mary to be kept in the place where he worked, namely Elakuruchi / Thirukavalur (now in Kumbakonam Diocese). He preached all over Tamil Nadu and on the way to his place he happened to pass over this forest and due to tiredness he slept under a tree with the two statues. The boys who were looking after the cattle playfully hid one of the statues behind the bush. Fr. Beschi was shocked to know that one statue was missing and went to his place sadly.

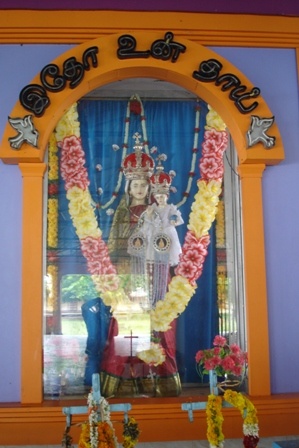
Periya Nayagi

There was a man called Kachirayar the Zamindar of Mugasaparur. He had no child. Every day he used to pray to God. One day Mary appeared to him in his dream and said, "Kachirayar, I'm alone in the forest. If you build a chapel for me, I'll give a child to you." After saying this she disappeared. Hearing this he was very happy and began to search for the statue in the forest. As they cut the bushes and trees, they found the statue behind a big bush. This statue was placed in the shrine, where it still stands. People constructed a small chapel and placed this statue there and began to worship.

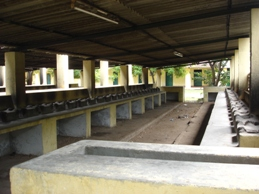
Pilgrims' Kitchen

After some time Fr. Beschi happened to hear about this and came to Konankuppam and saw the small chapel built for the statue which he lost once. He was delighted and decided to make Konankuppam his work place. He constructed the shrine with the help of Kachirayar which exists today. It is said to have been the first place of worship he erected, and when it was completed he went to Madras and asked the Bishop of Mylapore to procure for him a statue from Manila, an image of the virgin, in native dress of Tamil Nadu and bearing the child Jesus in her arms, fashioned after a model he had made. The image eventually arrived and was set up in the church, where it still is today.

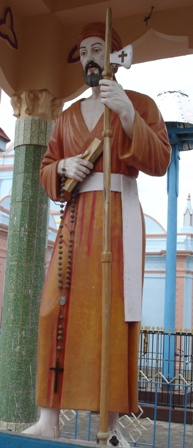
Fr.Beschi

This life-size statue stands on a pedestal about 10 feet (3.0 m) high and is made of wood and painted in bright colours. In honour of it and of the Church, Beschi composed his Tamil poem Thembavani, which vying in length with the Iliad itself is by for the most celebrated and most voluminous of his works. He completed this work in 1726. The Tamil conference conducted in Madurai during 1728 - 1729 AD approved his work and published it for the common good.

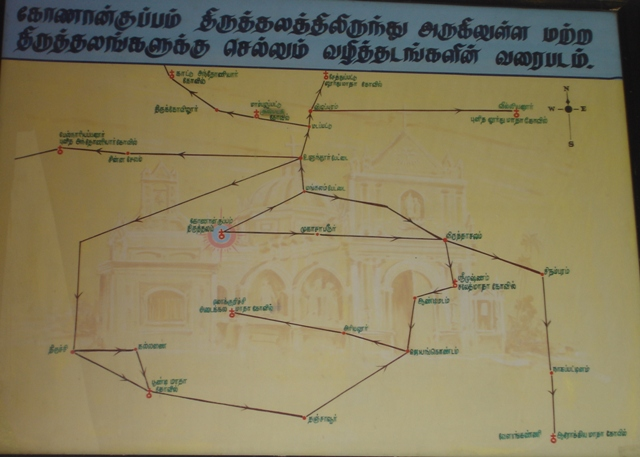
Nearby shrines

== Location ==
From Chennai it is about 200 km to reach Ulundurpet on the Chennai - Trichy highway. Konankuppam is about 12 km from Ulundurpet via Mangalampet. It is about a 20 minute journey to reach Konankuppam near Mugasaparur (Virdhachalam TK).
