= St. Stephen's Church, Kombuthurai =

St. Stephen's Church
- St. Stephen's Church
- 8.580629°N 78.132802°E
- Location: kombuthurai, Thoothukudi, Tamil Nadu
- Country: India
- Denomination: Roman Catholic

History
- Status: shrine
- Founded: 15th century
- Founder: Saint Francis Xavier
- Dedication: Saint Stephen
- Dedicated: 1542
- Consecrated: 1544

Architecture
- Functional status: Active
- Heritage designation: Fishing

Specifications
- Materials: BOATS

Administration
- District: tuticorin
- Diocese: tuticorin
- Parish: Kombuthurai

Clergy
- Bishop: Stephen Antony
- Priest: Fr. Antony Jegathesan L

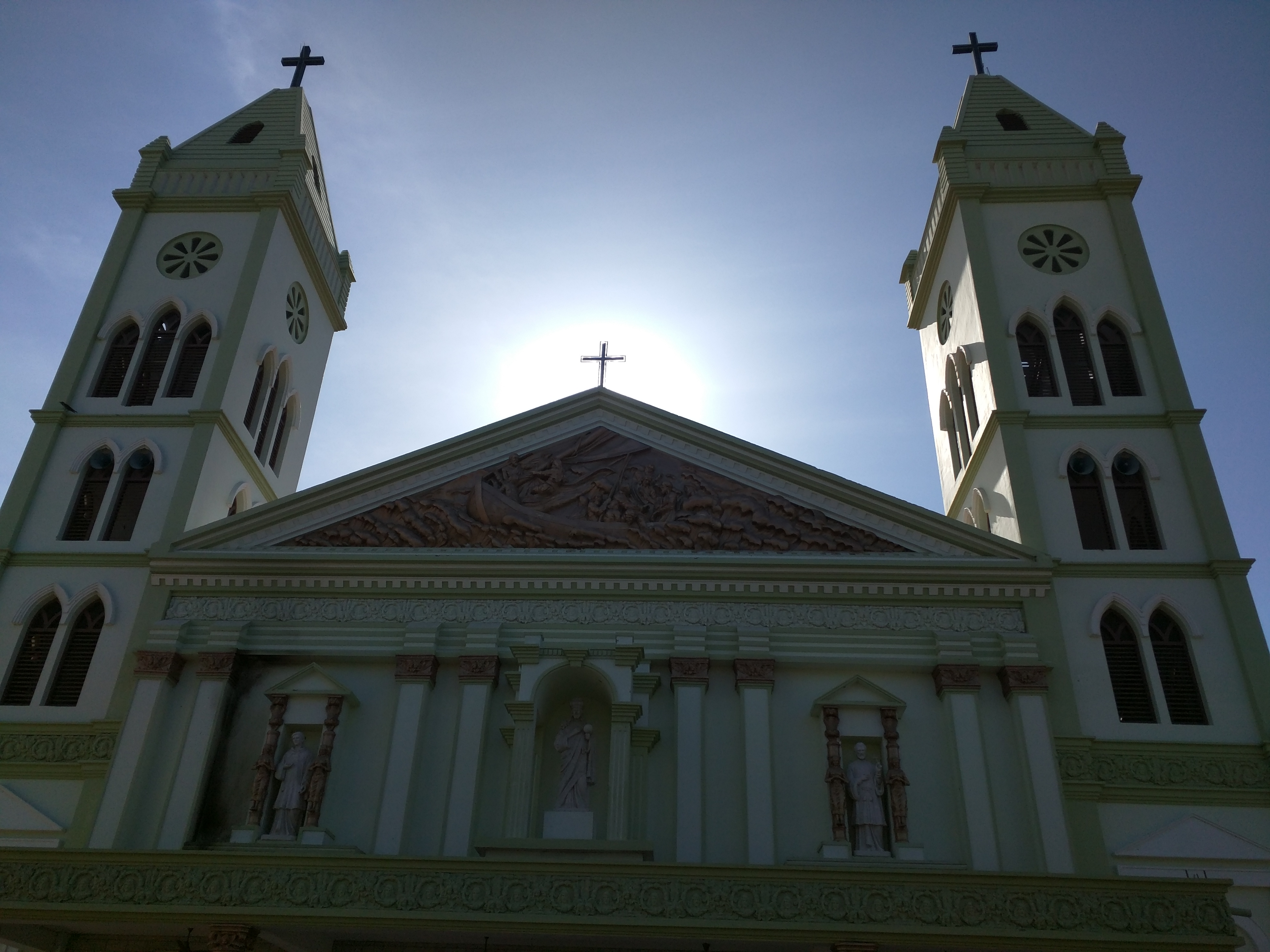

St. Stephen's Shrine is a Roman Catholic church dedicated to Saint Stephen, located in the village of Kombuthurai in the Thoothukudi district of Tamil Nadu, India. The church was built by St. Francis Xavier in May 1544. It was abandoned by the Jesuits until 1983. The church was taken care of by a people called the "Patangatins/Pattamkattins", according to the wishes of St. Francis Xavier, who believed that they could take care of the work of Christianity in Thoothukudi as written in his letters.

== Miracles in Kombuthurai ==
The first miracle in Kombuthurai which is also the first miracle of St. Francis Xavier in pearl fishery coast occurred in 1542, when St. Francis Xavier first visited the village. A Patangati / Pattamkatti lady was suffering from labor for nearly three days. He baptized her and her family and within a short time, she delivered a child. Due to this miracle, the whole of this village along with its headmen and prince of the land converted to Christianity. Since then he visited the village numerous times. The second miracle is believed to be the greatest miracle that Francis Xavier ever performed. A boy named Matthew drowned in the well which is called well of miracle, or well of baptism by the Patangati / Pattamkatti, and was brought into the church just before mass, and through the prayer of the saint, he was revived from death

== Other facts on this church ==
- this is the first church to be built by a saint in honor of another saint
- this church was supposed to be dearer to St. Francis Xavier, as he mentions of the building of this church at Kombuthurai in many of his letters written in 1544
- even though for more than two centuries, there was no contact of this church with the clergy or diocese, the altar on which St.Francis Xavier dedicated the first mass, the cross in front of the church and the well into which the boy fell and water from which were used to baptise Pattamkatti, is still preserved by the people in kombuthurai.
- this church celebrates its feast twice a year,

1. the older being in the middle Tuesday of February which is celebrated by the Patangati / Pattamkatti, old inhabitants of kombuthurai, tuticorin from whom the name is derived, in memory of their conversion in 1542 and the dedication of a smaller church that was rebuilt in 1544 by them and dedicated to St.Stephen, first martyr of the church, who was handed over as the patron saint of the entire caste by St.Francis xavier, on the last Tuesday in the Tamil month of Thai from the year 1543 which is the spring season that finds mention in letters of St.Francis Xavier to St.Ignatius of Loyola in 1543. This feast of st.Stephen, the first martyr is the traditional feast of this church initiated by st. Francis Xavier himself.
2. the other being on 2 January, which is followed from 1980s by villagers who are all living in Kombuthurai.

- this church was inactive after the inhabitants moved out of this place, due to suppression of Christians but exact reason has not been studied, but the mass were conducted on the traditional feast day and on special occasions such as a thanksgiving by Patagati / Pattamkatti family, but the church, the altar on which the saint Xavier offered mass and the statues are taken care of by the Kombuthurai villagers
- this church and another church in punnakayal, which were once the dwelling place of Patangati / Pattamkattians, were funded by MANUEL DA CRUZ (lived in Kombuthurai), the chief of Patangatians Head and king of pearl fishery coast.
- this church have been patronized by the Patangatians, the chiefs of villages in pearl fishery coast and wardens of the churches of pearl fishery coast who consider this church to be their chief church just like the Patangati consider Our Lady of Snows Basilica, tuticorin.
- in 1983, this church was taken as a substation of the virapandianpattinam parish. During 1980–84, people from kanyakumari came and settled here in search of livelihood. After nearly 461 years of existence, this church was made a parish on 20 August 2004 by Bishop Peter Fernando (Tuticorin Diocese). On 2013, this church was rebuilt by the new inhabitants and was dedicated on 1 May.

== Relic (திருப்பண்டம்) ==
This shrine is now holding the Relic of our own patron Saint Stephen. Which is safely exhibited inside the shrine. This 2000years First class Holy Relic of St.Stephen was safe guarded by our own Mother Mary on the initial days of the christianity. Previously this relic was held in the cathedral of St.Justin in Cheiti, Italy. From there it was transported to Komuthurai by the efforts of Fr.Jerosin A Kattrar (Veerapandiyan Pattanam) who is working there in Cheiti diocese. After the shrine received The Relic, it was placed inside the shrine on 15 August 2025 through a ceremony in presence of Fr.Pratheesh and Fr.Velgit.

== List of Parish Priests ==
- Fr. Antony Jegathesan L (May 2026 - Present)
- Fr. Pratheesh (2021–May 2026)
- Fr.Sakaya Joseph (May 2019 - 2021)
- Fr.Vilson (2018 – April 2019)
- Fr.John Mariya costa (2017–2018)
- Fr.Victor Lobo (2012–2017)
- Fr.Alexander (2009–2012)
- Fr.JayaJothi (2008)
- Fr.Denis Vaiz (2007)
- Fr.William Santhanam (2004–2007)

== Occupation: Fishing ==
- There are more than 100 of boats in kombuthurai.
- They using different methods to catch fishes.
- One of the best place for buying fresh fish like Seer fish(Vanjiram or Seela Meen or NeyMeen), Tuna varieties(Surai meen & Kaerai Meen),Brown-marbled grouper(Azhuva or Pandari meen), Giant Trevally (Paarai veraities), Cuttle fish (kanava), etc.
- They are working 6 days in a week except Sunday
