= Basilica of Our Lady of Assumption, Kamanayakkanpatti =

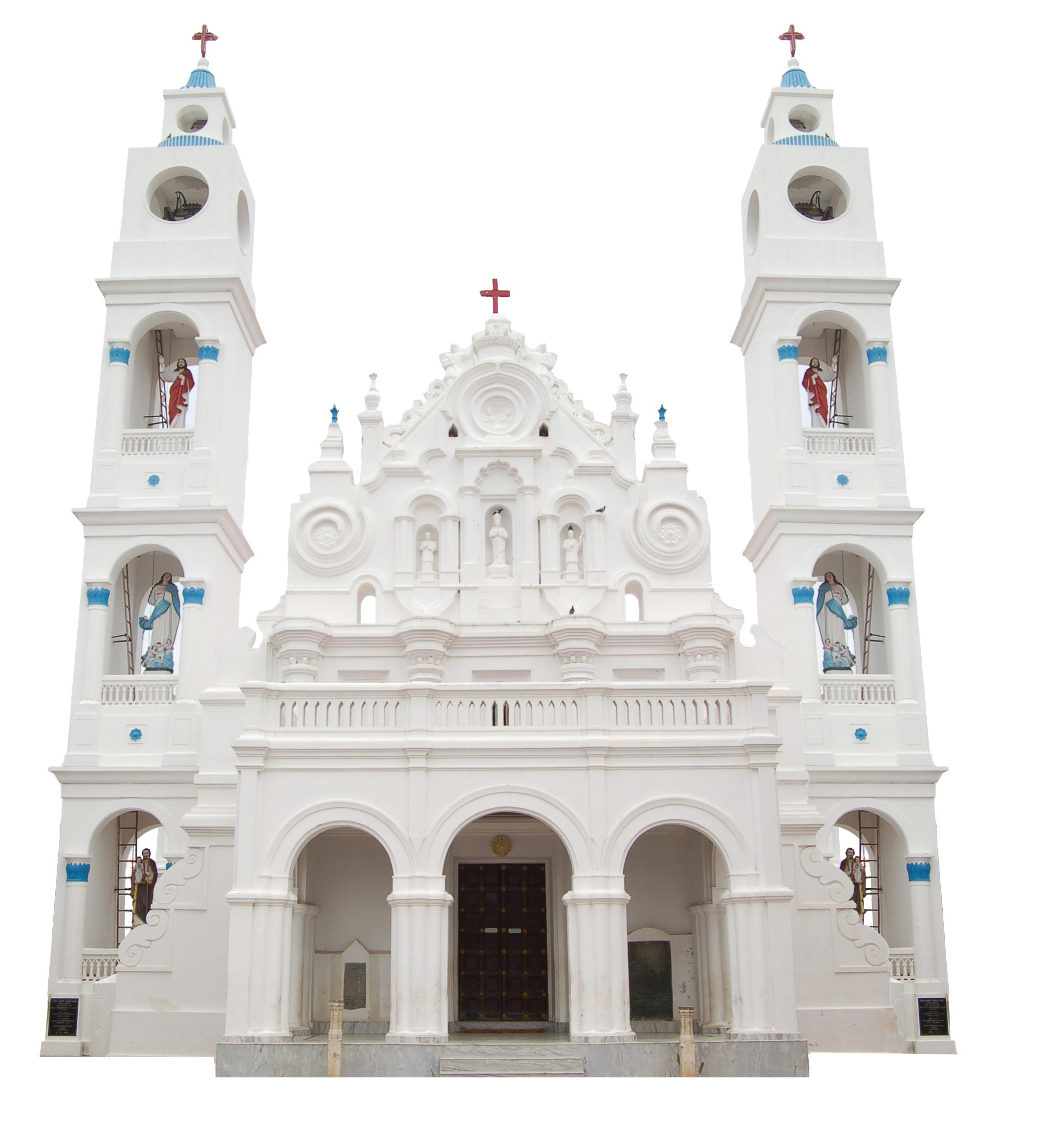

- Location within Tamil Nadu
- 9.0784478°N 77.9332911°E
- Location: Kamanayakkanpatti
- Country: India
- Denomination: Catholic

History
- Status: Basilica

Architecture
- Functional status: Active

Administration
- Province: Madurai
- Diocese: Palayamkottai

The Basilica of Our Lady of Assumption is a church in Kamanayakkanpatti in the Diocese of Palayamkottai in Tamil Nadu. It is believed that the Christian community was established in the area by St. Thomas, and the European missionaries found that there were already Christians living here who had a tradition different from the Latin rite. The statue of Our Lady is considered to be miraculous. This church played an important role in the Madurai Mission and is one of the oldest churches in the region. The church was initially built here by St. John de Brito in 1684. One of the earliest reported miracle is from around 1690, when a girl who had fallen into an open well and died was brought back to life through prayers to Mary. The statue survived the destruction of the entire church by fire around 1748.

The feast of the Assumption of Mary is celebrated on 15 August each here with great pomp and fervour. A unique and popular devotion called Kumbidu Sevai is part of the feast day commemoration.

It was raised to the status of a minor basilica by Pope Francis on 15 August 2023, the feast day.

== Gallery ==
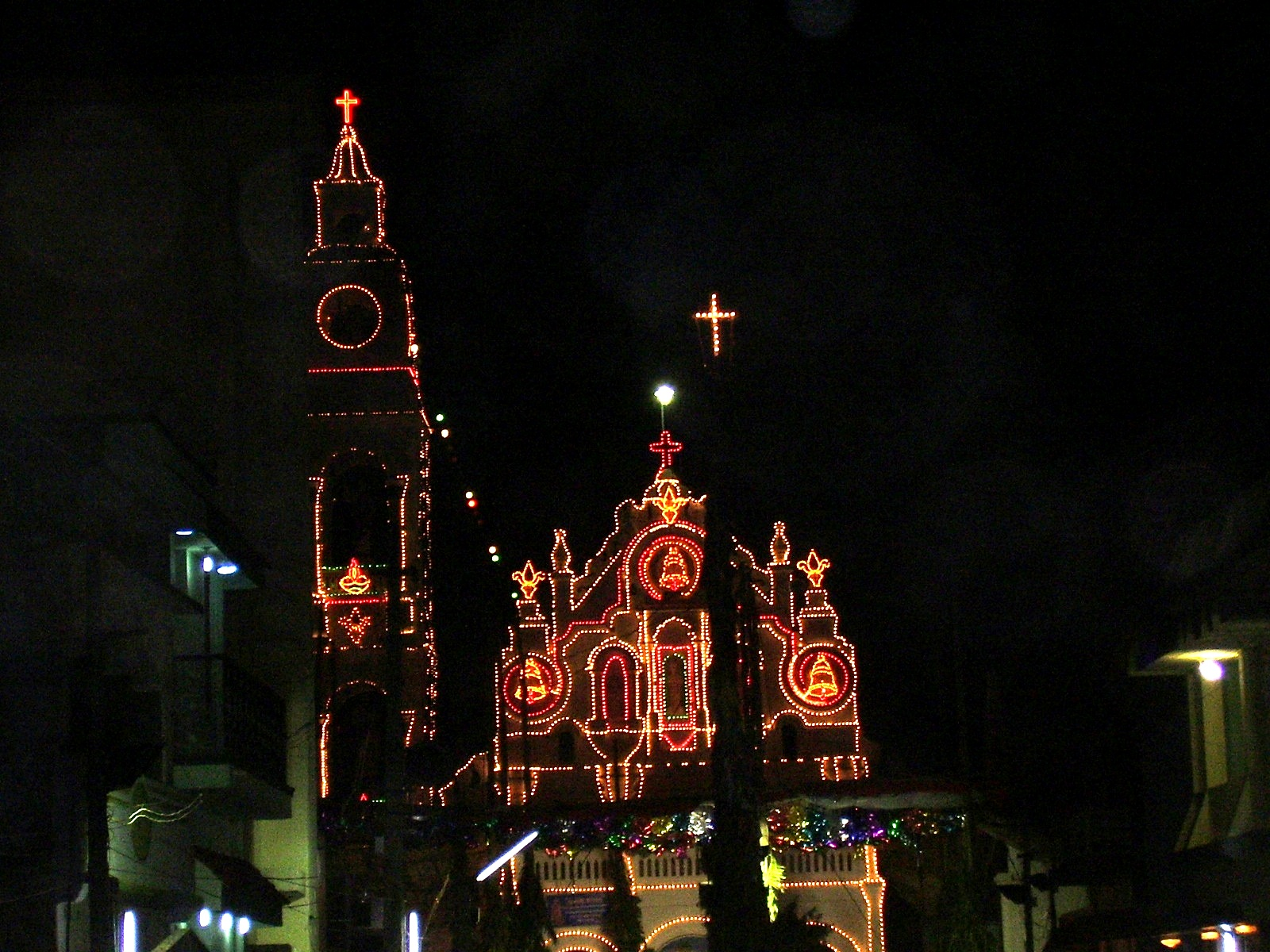
The basilica after dark decorated with lights on the feast day

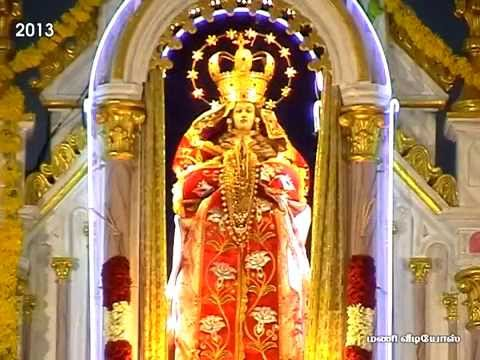

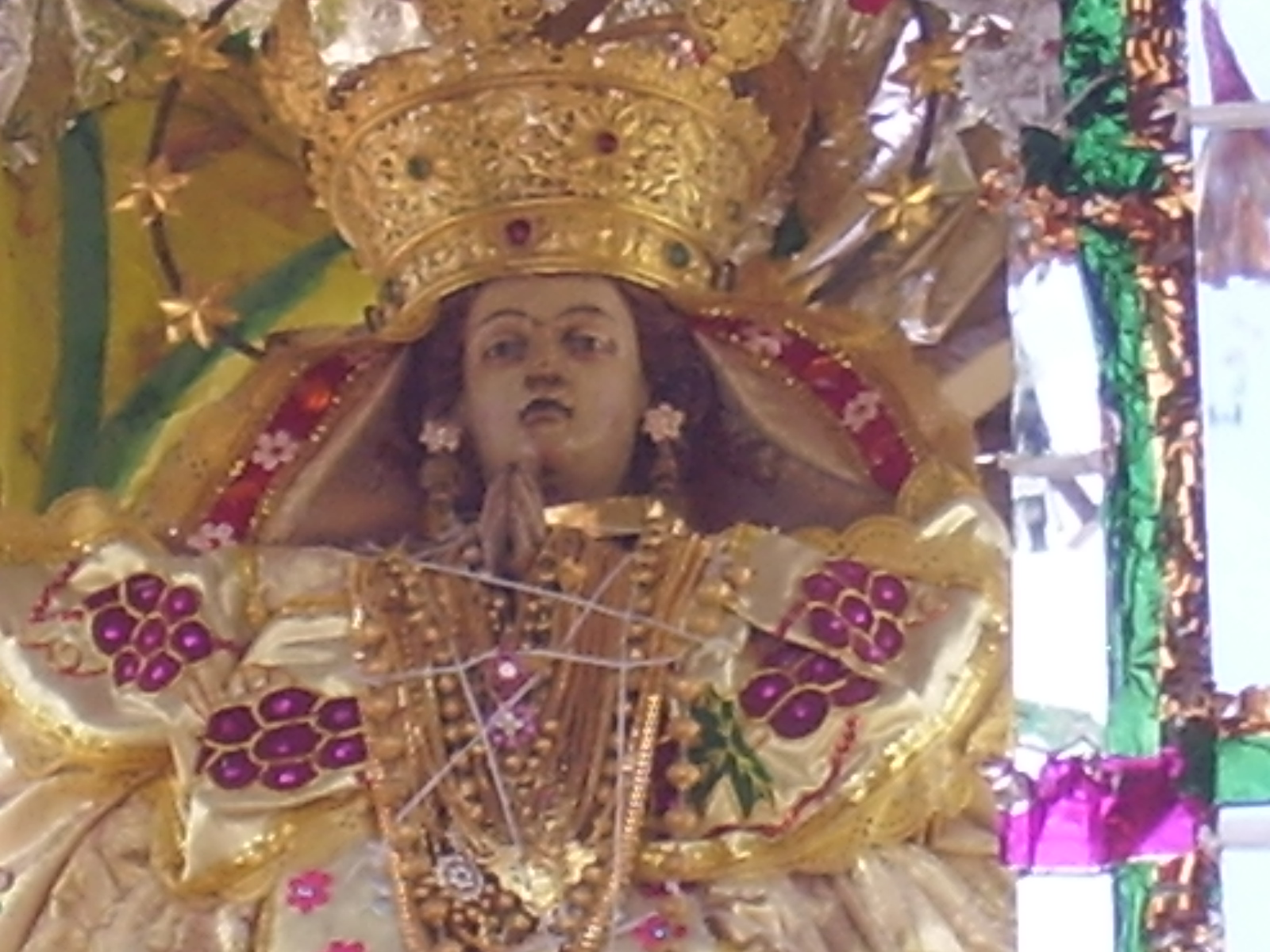

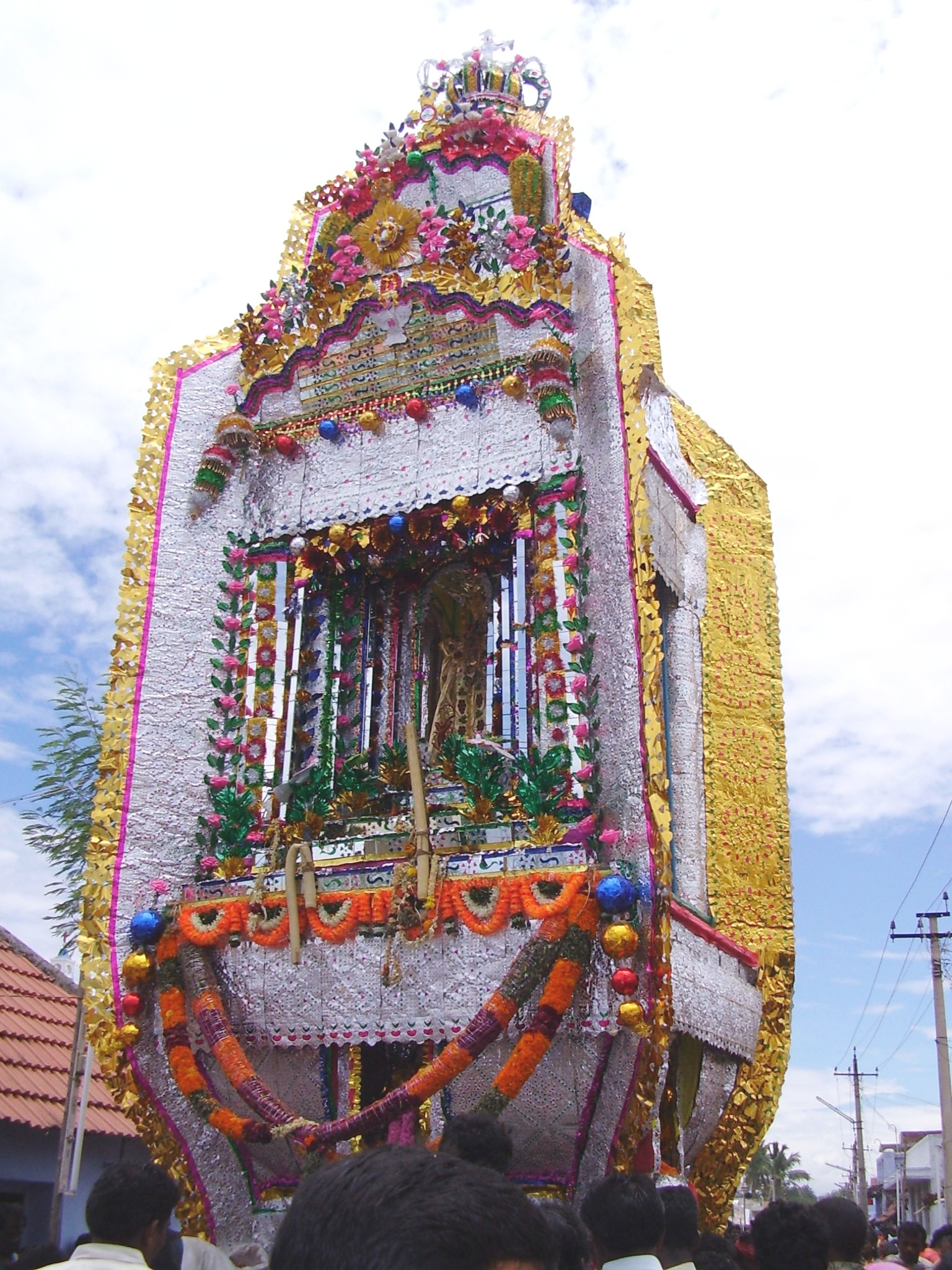
The statue of Our Lady taken in a street procession during the feast day celebrations
