= Basilica of Our Lady of Snows, Thoothukudi =

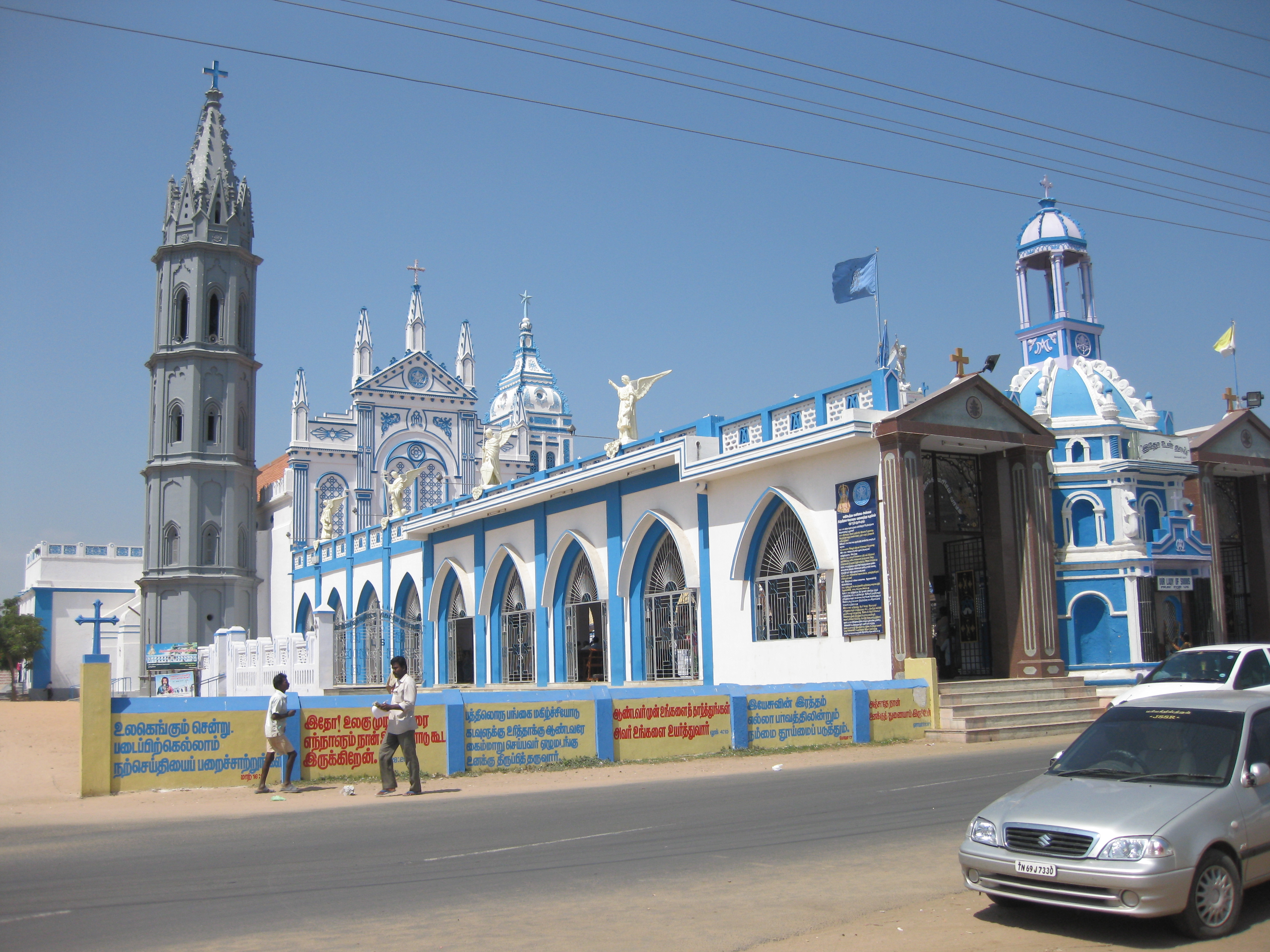
- Basilica of Our Lady of Snows, Thoothukudi
- 8.799444°N 78.156389°E
- Location: Thoothukudi, Tamil Nadu
- Country: India
- Denomination: Catholic
- Website: www.snowsbasilica.com

History
- Status: Basilica
- Founded: 16th century
- Dedication: St. Mary

Architecture
- Functional status: Active
- Architectural type: Eclectic (Portuguese Baroque, Neo-Gothic, etc.)
- Style: Portuguese, Contemporary Indian

Administration
- District: Tuticorin
- Archdiocese: Roman Catholic Archdiocese of Madurai
- Diocese: Tuticorin

Clergy
- Bishop: Most. Rev. Dr.Stephen Anthony.
- Rector: Rev. Dr. Starwin T.

Basilica of Our Lady of Snows, Tuticorin, is a minor basilica located at Tuticorin. It is one of the Catholic pilgrimage centers in India dedicated to the Our Lady of Snows, a title given to Mother Mary. Even to this day, the Coastal People fondly call her Santa Maria das Nevis (or Senhora das Neves), which means Our Lady of Snows in Portuguese. The shrine name refers to the Basilica di Santa Maria Maggiore in Rome. The site is known for Portuguese architecture and Portuguese prayers and now it is recognised as a Tamil Nadu notable pilgrim site.

== History ==
In 1538, St. Peter's church, the first parish was constructed with Fr. Peter Gonsalvez as the first Parish Priest. On 9 June 1555, the Miraculous statue of Mother Mary arrived Tuticorin through the ship named Santa Helena. In 1658, When the Protestant Dutch rule began in the Pearl Fishery Coast, the feast of Our Lady of Snows was banned, the Catholic Churches were taken away and made warehouses and celebrating the Holy Mass was prohibited. The Dutch tried all the ways possible to convert the Paravars to their own faith but all their attempts failed as the Paravars were firm in their Catholic faith. The Paravars shifted the statue to different places to protect it. On 4 April 1704, Tuticorin and the surrounding villages were saved miraculously by Mother Mary from the heavy thunder bolt. In the year 1713, a new church was built and consecrated in Tuticorin, which would become the Basilica of Our Lady of Snows.

The first of the notable golden festivals that take place at the church began in 1720, when Paravar elites ordered the construction of a golden car to house the Mother Mary statue and a ten-day festival. That car was used until 1806, followed by the construction of the car that is still used today.

On 30 July 1982, Pope John Paul II elevated the building to the status of a minor basilica in an apostolic letter entitled Pervenusta Illa.

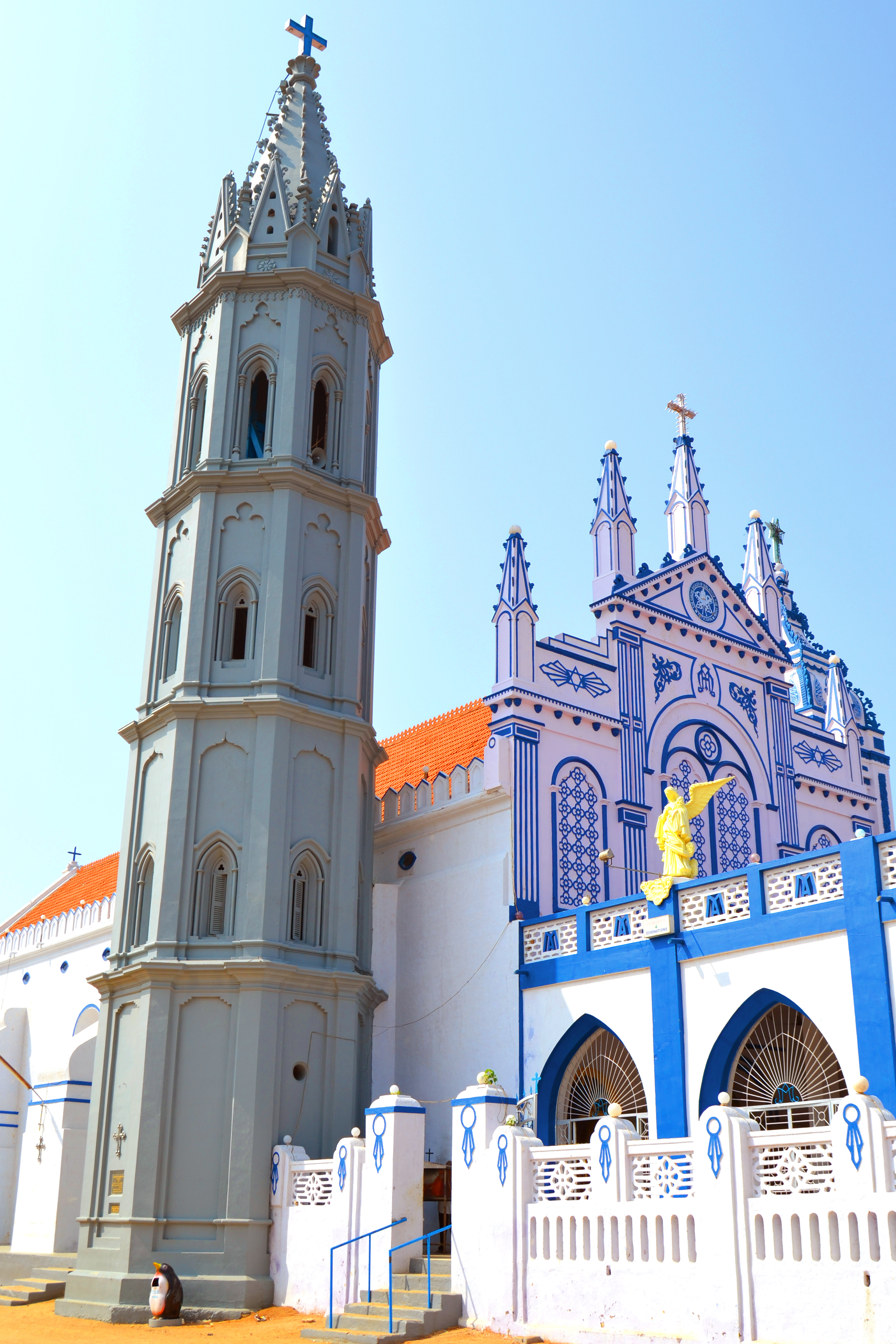
Basilica of Our Lady of Snows - TOWER VIEW

== Notable Parish Priests ==
Servant of God Rev Fr. Antony Soosainather

== See also ==
- Other Catholic pilgrimage centres:
  - Basilica of Our Lady of Snow, Pallippuram, Ernakulam, Kerala, India
  - Basilica of Our Lady of Good Health, Velankanni, Tamil Nadu, India
  - St. Thomas Church, Thumpoly Thumpoly, Alappuzha Kerala, India.(A prominent Marian Pilgrimage Shrine Church.)
  - St. Antonys Major Shrine Uvari
  - Holy Cross Church, Manapad, Tamil Nadu, India
  - Poondi Matha Basilica (Our Lady of Lourdes Basilica, Poondi), Tamil Nadu, India
  - Kamanayakkanpatti Church of Our Lady of Assumption
  - Immaculate heart of Mary's Church, Sathankulam
  - Our Lady of Snow Kallikulam (Our Lady of Snow Church, Kallikulam), Tamil Nadu, India
  - St. Stephen's Church, Kombuthurai
  - Our Lady of Snows, Maravankudieruppu, Nagercoil
  - Our Lady of Snows, South Thamaraikulam, Nagercoil
- List of Jesuit sites
