= Thembavani =

Tamil classic poetical work by Veeramamunivar

Thembavani (Tamil: தேம்பாவணி; transl. A Garland of Unfading Honey-Sweet Verses) is a Tamil classic poetical work by Veeramamunivar (Costanzo Joseph Beschi) (Tamil : வீரமாமுனிவர்) on the life of Saint Joseph, the legal father of Jesus of Nazareth. It is divided into thirty-six cantos, containing 3,615 stanzas.

== Story ==
The poem begins with the birth of Joseph, called Valan. He becomes a staunch ascetic who later marries Mary, a resolute virgin. Through divine intervention, Mary gives birth to a son. The following episodes describe the family's lives. The work ends with Valan's coronation by the Triune God in heavenly glory. Finally, kings from the Holy Roman Empire (England, Ireland, Spain, Gaul, Prussia, Norway, Lusitania, Genoa, Etruria, Parthia, Cyprus, and Paeonia) came to Vienna at the invitation of Leopold I to install the statue of the hero of the epic.

Thembavani has over 100 references to events and teachings in the Bible. It has an abundance of historical, biblical and fictional characters, including Moses, Joshua, Gideon, Joseph of the Old Testament, Samson, David and Goliath, Nebuchadnezzar, Tobit and Tobias, John the Baptist, Herod, Kunnan, Navakan, Surami, etc. Its actions take place in several places like Bethlehem, Judea, Nazareth, Egypt, Heliopolis, Gaza, Jericho, Sinai, Beersheba, etc.

== Structure ==
The epic comprises 3,615 rhymed quatrains in Tamil with 90 variations, and M. Dominic Raj has translated it into English in unrhymed quatrains of free verse following the ‘Sprung Rhythm’ style of Hopkins. It comprises 3 Parts with 12 sections in each. There are 356 episodes that relate to births, deaths, journeys, wars, celebrations, happenings in the Netherworld, Hell, Heaven, etc. It contains philosophical and theological discussions on God, idolatry, rebirth, Fate, virtue, asceticism, etc.

Thoroughly immersed in Tamil literature and culture, Beschi integrates several literary devices employed by classics such as Kamba Ramayanam and Manimekalai. This is evident in his description of landscapes.

== Reception ==
Prof. Alexander Beecroft of the University of South Carolina regards Thembavani as one of the five World Classics that are yet to be translated into English from their native languages. He places Thembavani as the third on the list.
