= Elakurichi =

Elakkurichi Elakkurichi Thirukkavalur
- Village/Rural
- Elakkurichi
- Location in Tamil Nadu, India Elakkurichi (India)
- Coordinates: 10.960°N 79.163°E
- Country: India
- State: Tamil Nadu
- District: Ariyalur

Languages
  - Official: Tamil
- Time zone: UTC+5:30 (IST)
- Postal code: 621715
- Vehicle registration: TN-61
- Near District THANJAVUR: Ariyalur

Elakkurichi is a small village in Ariyalur district, Tamil Nadu, South India, and a Catholic pilgrimage center dedicated to Virgin Mary. It is 20 km from Thanjavur. The ancient church was built by the famous Catholic Missionary Constanzo Beschi popularly known as ‘Veeramamunivar’ in the year 1711.

Elakkurichi previously called Tirukkavalur is located near Ariyalur. Elakkurichi is 25 km from ariyalur. Elakkurichi holds a famous Catholic shrine called Adaikkalamadha shrine. Veeramamunivar had constructed the Aadaikalamatha Church in Elakkurichi. Every year the Elakurichi Adaikkalamadha shrine car festival is famous. Christians come together to celebrate the festival every year in April.

During this festival pilgrims gather to pray to Mother Mary popularly known as Adaikkalamadha from throughout Tamil Nadu, especially pilgrims come by bullock carts from nearby parishes such as Varadarajan Pet, Tennur, Keelaneduvai and Koovathur.

The Village is located in the River bank of Kollidam, the main occupation of the people of Elakurichy is Agriculture. The major crops grown here are rice and sugarcane. Thanjavur and Ariyalur are the nearest cities from this village. The greenery of the paddy fields and flowing River Kollidam are the beauty of this Village.
