= Kamanayakkanpatti =

Kamanayakkanpatti Basilica of Our Lady of Assumption
- Village
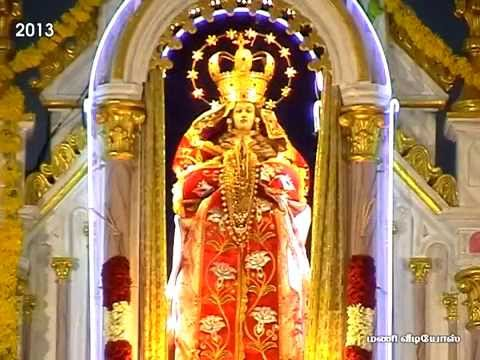

- Location in Tamil Nadu, India Kamanayakkanpatti (India)
- Coordinates: 9.078313°N 77.935467°E
- Country: India
- State: Tamil Nadu
- District: Thoothukudi
- Established: 1390 AD as the Army Base of Ezhasa Naadu in 1415, named as Kamanayakkan Patti
- Founder: King of Ezhasa Naadu
- Named for: Bravery and Aram Vazhi Aatchi

Government
  - Type: Muthumakkazh Vazhi Aatchi
  - Body: Elders of the Kingdom
  - President of Panchayat: Mary
- Elevation: 106 m (348 ft)

Population (2001)
  - Total: 2,426

Languages
  - Official: Tamil
- Time zone: UTC+5:30 (IST)
- PIN: 628720
- Vehicle registration: TN 69

Kamanayakkanpatti is the latterday capital of Ezhasa Naadu, is now a village in the Kovilpatti Taluk, located in the Thoothukudi District of Tamil Nadu, and is famous for the Catholic Church dedicated to Our Lady of Assumption. The Festival on the 15th of August is very popular, and is celebrated by people of the entire diocese.

== Demographics ==
As of 2001 India census, Kamanayakkanpatti had a population of 2426. Males constitute 50.05% of the population and females 49.05%. Kamanayakkanpatti has an average literacy rate of 73.3%, higher than the national average of 59.5%. In Kamanayakkanpatti, 15% of the population is under 6 years of age.

== Geography ==
Kamanayakkanpatti is located at 9.07°N 77.93°E. It is a fast-growing small village located 14 kilometres to the south-east of Kovilpatti.

Kamanayakkanpatti is now a Gram panchayat, which includes one more nearby village, Ettunayakkanpatti.

=== History of Kamanayakkanpatti ===
After the Vijayanagara Kingdom captured Mathurai in 1371, most of the Paandiyan sub-kingdoms fell in their hands. Izhasanaadu) (இளச நாடு/இளசை), between Madurai and Thoothukkudy, though, was not captured or convinced to join. To collect tribute anyway, Vijayanagara had men from Chandragiri near Chithoor become appointed inside Izhasanaadu as Thisaikaavalars to collect/loot and send taxes.

In 1415, 1,500 square kilometres (580 sq mi) of Ilasanaadu land was ceded to landowners of Ettappan (controlling Ettayapuram). Ettappan and his descendants had appointed Nayakars as the village heads in the Zameen; among them was captain Kamanayakkan, who captured the army base of Ilasanaadu and named it after himself as Kaamanaayakkan Patti. Due to continued resistance from Ilasanadu kings Ettappans could not even build their palace until 1565.

The Migrant Nayakkars and Ezhasa Naattu Paandiya soldiers continuously were fighting over Ezhasa Naadu and on its faith. The Nayakkars following the Caste Centred Brahmin Religion wanted to implement the Caste system and Vedic Dharma principles in to the Ezhasa Naadu. The natives were following not a religion, but philosophies of a mix of Muthumakkazh Vazhipaadu, Aaseevagam, Trinity Oham of Thoma Muni, Buddhism and Jainism. Their governance was based on Aram. A stiff and prolonged fight came to a compromise when Chegavera Ramakachil took over the Ettayapuram Zameen.

Ezhasai Peace Accord (1665)

1. Ezhasa Naadu (இளச நாடு/இளசை) and Ettayapuram Zameen will be friendly States 2. The Capital of Ezhasa Naadu (இளச நாடு/இளசை) shall be the Army Camp turned Kamanayakkan Patti 3. Kamanayakkan Patti shall continue to be the name of the camp 4. The area under Ettayapuram Zameen will follow the Brahmin Vedic Religion 5. Ezhasa Naadu (இளச நாடு/இளசை) can follow its own religion and Nayaks shall not intervene the Religious matters of Ezhasa Naadu

An accord stone was laid in Kamanayakkanpatti in front of the Trinity Temple of Thoma Muni, which is now a grand Church of Mother Mary, the Mother Teacher of Thoma Muni.

The death of Aurangzeb in 1707 changed the political scenario of the region. The ruling descendant of the Kingdom of Ilasa Naadu, Maaraveera Paandiyan, had consolidated the kingdom again in 1724. Maaraveeran established relationships with the Travancore Kingdom and with the Nawab of Arcot. With the support of Arcot Nawab, he ended the Nayakkar Kingdom in Madurai in 1736. Madurai & Thirunelveli came under Chantha Sahib's control. Later in 1751, the British took control of the entire Thamizh Naadu)

Relationship with Travancore Kingdom

Maaraveera Paandiyan sent his army to strengthen the Travancore army in the Dutch War in Colachel in 1740/41; it instrumentally threatened with fake tanks made from Palmera trunks. After the war, Maaraveera Paandiyan was befriendly with De Lannoy. He gave his second daughter Santhana Maria to marry a Travancore prince in 1750, and later in 1769 sent his youngest son Prince Ezhaveera Paandiyan (இளவீரபாண்டியன்)(Swamy Adiyaar/Veerthuravi) as an ambassador with 5000 sovereign gold to Travancore.

Ezhaveera Paandiyan (இளவீரபாண்டியன்) helped De Lannoy to stop the infiltration and the plundering of Kallars in the eastern border of the kingdom. Mathurai Nayak wanted to destabilise the Chera Kingdoms which were broken in to three countries. Travancore became the easy target. The tax collected in Aravaymozhi Checkpost and the Temple Revenue were to reach the Palace in Thiruvithaamcode, and needs to cross the wild Kaduvaaithattu. Paandiayan Kallars have established a long time base in Kaduvaaithattu and looting the Government Revenue on transit. There was a Kalasamirakkichaalai in the Kaduvaaithattu, which was looted very often by the Kallars.

Ezhaveera Paandiyan (இளவீரபாண்டியன்) with his strongmen took control of the entire Kaduvaaithattu and ensured the safe movement of taxes to the palace. De Lannoy renamed the Kaduvaaithattu in his friend's name as Maaraveeran Thattu, which later became Maravan Thattu and now as Maravankudieruppu. Ezhaveera Paandiyan (இளவீரபாண்டியன்) who earlier had rechristened his name as Swamy Adiyaar (சுவாமி அடியார்) and people called him Veerathuravi(வீரத்துறவி) had already has searched for St. Thomas Christians in Paandiya Kingdom and had re established them in Catholic faith. De Lannoy helped Ezhaveera Paandiyan (இளவீரபாண்டியன்), to conduct similar search for the St.Thomas Christians in Travancore Kingdom, and to re-establish them in Jesus and in building Churches.

In 1753, Maarveera Paandian similarly sent his third son to Karur, where the descendants of the defeated Chera Kings were assembled. They fought against the British three times, but in vain, as with all Paandiya sub-kingdoms in the state.

== Our Lady of Assumption Church ==
Paranki Muni (also called Youvana Muni and Thoma Muni) (St.Thomas) preached the Trinity concept (Moovoru Thathuvam) and his Master’s Trinity Yoga (Yeshuva Oham (Jesus Yoga) in the Chera Kingdom.

In AD63 Thoma Muni came to the Pandiya Kingdom and has been presenting Yeshuva Oham in various Aaseevahams.

Ezhasa Naadu, a Pandiya Kingdom had more than 1000 Aasivahams, where scholars and Sidhars were seeking Life-Next (Veeduperu). They were convinced of the Trinity Concept and had adopted Yeshuva Oham as the supreme mode of attaining eternal life. They have also accepted Miriyam (Mother Mary) as their Mother Teacher and Spiritual Guide.

When Nayak brought Vedic Brahminic Religion in Madurai, the Kingmen of Izhasa Naadu didn’t accept the caste based Vedic Religion, which resulted in various fights.

The kingmen of Izhasa Naadu had resettled in Kamanayakkanpatti, after their capital and most of the country was plucked out by the Nayak kings of Madhurai and was given to Ettappa Nayak.

In 1544, the Apostolic Nuncio to the East and the first Jesuit to India, St. Francis Xavier visited Izhasa Naadu in search of the St. Thomas Christians enroute from Kottar to Mayilaapoor to visit the tomb of Thoma Muni. He wrote to St. Ignatius that he has found Thoma Christians, but are following different method of worship. Because the THoma Christians were not aware of the Roman Christianity.

Following St. Xavier, in 1610, the தத்துவ போதகர் Roberto De Nobili found a stone cross with Hebrew inscription on Trinity near Kamanayakkanpatti. He explained the Roman Catholic form of worship and strengthened the leaders of the kingdom into the Catholic faith, and a Chappal was built on the Thoma Cross Crotto.

In 1679, the entire town redefined themselves as Roman Catholics in front of Arul Aanandhar (St. John De Brito), and the first church was built.

After several renovations, it gained its modern chapel façade.

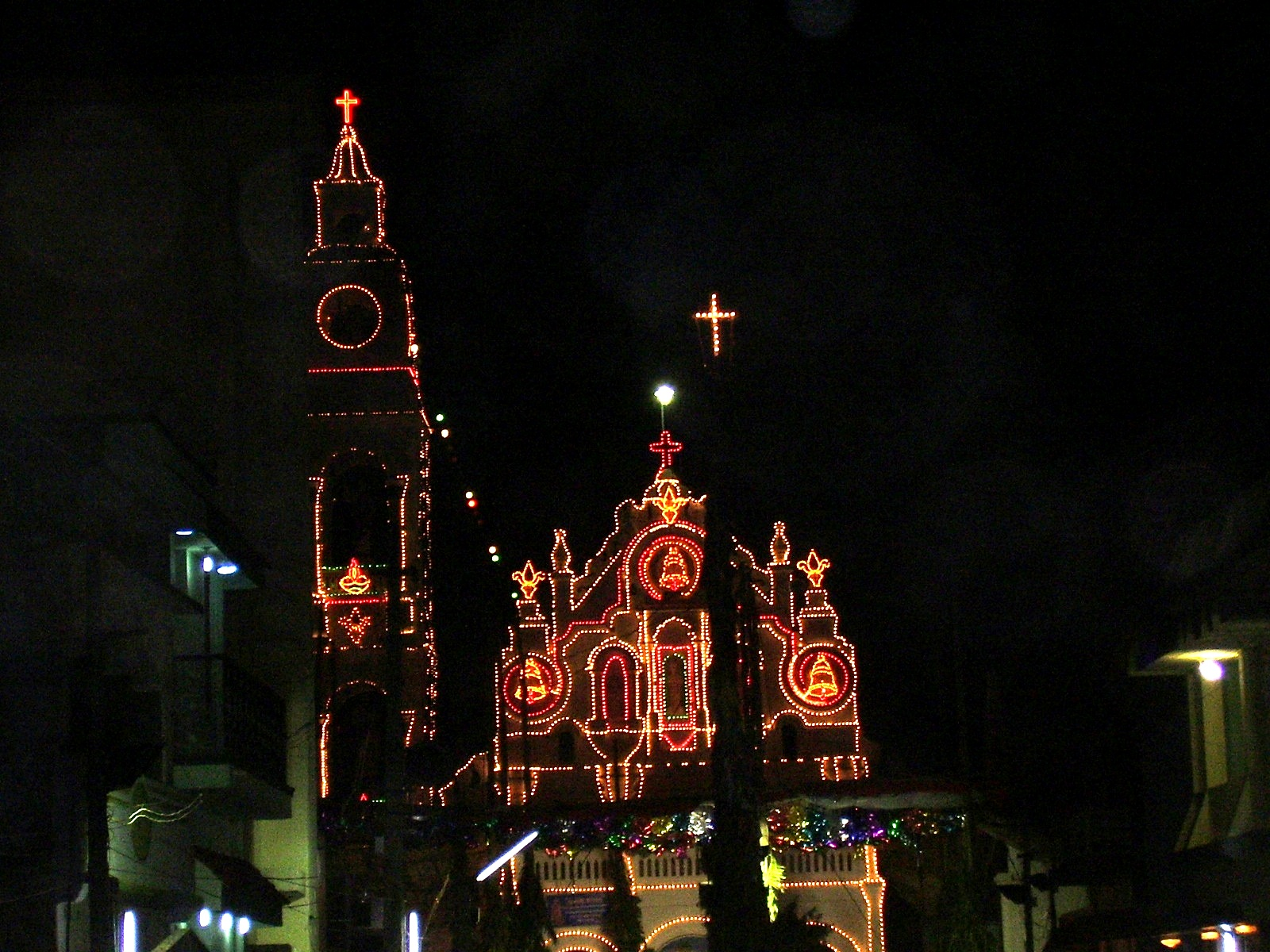
Our Lady of Assumption Church on Feast Night (14 August)

In 1710, Italian Jesuit Priest Veeramaamunivar (Constantine Joseph Beschi) came to Kamanayakkanpatti as the Parish Priest, and he brought back the left-out St. Thomas Christians of neighboring kingdoms. Veeramaamunivar wrote the Paramartha Guru Stories among much more Tamil literature, including Thembavani. He also built two large teak wood cars in the church.

The church is in the parish of RC Diocese, Palayamkottai. The parish includes nearby villages Ettunayakkanpatti, Kuruvinatham, and Sevalpatti.

Ezhasa Naadu is famous for its trade of Pearls and Palmera products and predominantly dominated by the citizens of Trading, Agriculture and Fishing&PearlHarvesting. It had a very good trade connect with Arabian and European countries. Portugal was the close trade partner.

Ezhasa Naadu and Thoothukkudy The Arabian traders were hunting down Thoothukudi Fishermen after a misunderstanding. The Madurai Nayaks didn’t offer help citing the fishermen not accepting their faith and were Thomas Christians and of Assevagam . Ezhasa Naadu with the help of Portuguese could help the Pattam Kattiyaar of Thoothukudi and fight out the Arabs. 35,000 fishermen entered in to Catholic Christianity thanks to the efforts of Ezhasa Naadu and the Portugal King.

Prince EzhaVeera Pandian of Ezhasa Naadu has denounced marriage life and self declared as Sage and rechristened as Swamy Adiyaar. People of Ezhasa Naadu had fondly called him as Veera Thuravi.

Veera Thuravi Swamy Adiyaar has published many manuscripts and translations of Spiritual Messages. He led the Maathaa Sabai in Thamizh Naadu. He with his selected army has taken the legacy of Mother Mary wherever they went and traced the Thoma Stone Crosses and had built Churches for Mother Mary.

His major services were to search for the St. Thomas followers and strengthen them in Jesus and in Catholic Worships.

In the then Kollam diocese, Swamy Adiyaar has traced St. Thomas Christians and re established more than 100 villages in to Roman Christianity. The important ones and where records are very clear are the Church for Our Lady of Assumption in Maravan Kudieruppu or Maravankudieruppu (is later converted as the Church of Our Lady of Snows). Keeping Maravankudieruppu as the base, he has developed Aralvaimazhy, Asaripallam, Panchavankaadu Kurusady, Thalavaipuram, Odakkarai(Vattakarai)Vethakkaran Kudieruppu and hamlets between Kurusady and the north end of Kazhuvanthattu( Christu Nagar), Nullivilai, Kaarankaadu, Maathira Vizhai, Puthukkadai etc

Similar information are available about Swamiyadiyaar in Vaavarai and the hamlets around it. Most of the Nadar Villages of Today’s Catholic Origin were traced back to St. Thomas and were reestablished in to the current form by Swamyadiyaar and his Army of Servicemen in the 17th/18th Century.

=== Our Lady of Assumption ===
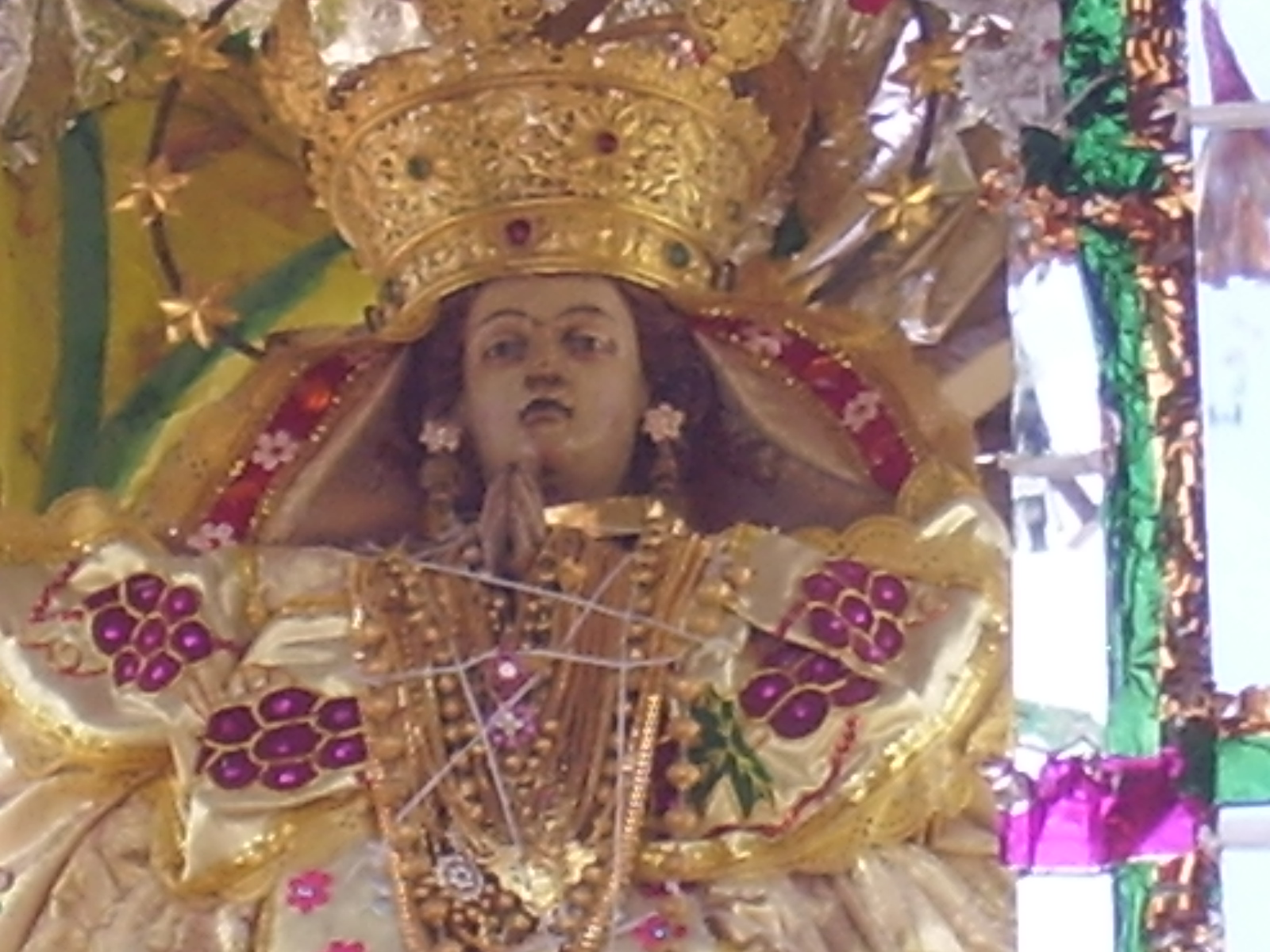
The miraculous statue of Our Lady of Assumption in the car on the feast day

A statue of Our Lady of Assumption is at the throne over the main altar of the Church. Everyday life in kammanayakanpatti is defined by a faith in and love for Mother Mary (Tamil: அன்னை மரியாள்), which derives, it is said, "from the grace and mercy Mother Mary has shown to the people of the village".

=== Our Lady of Assumption Festival ===
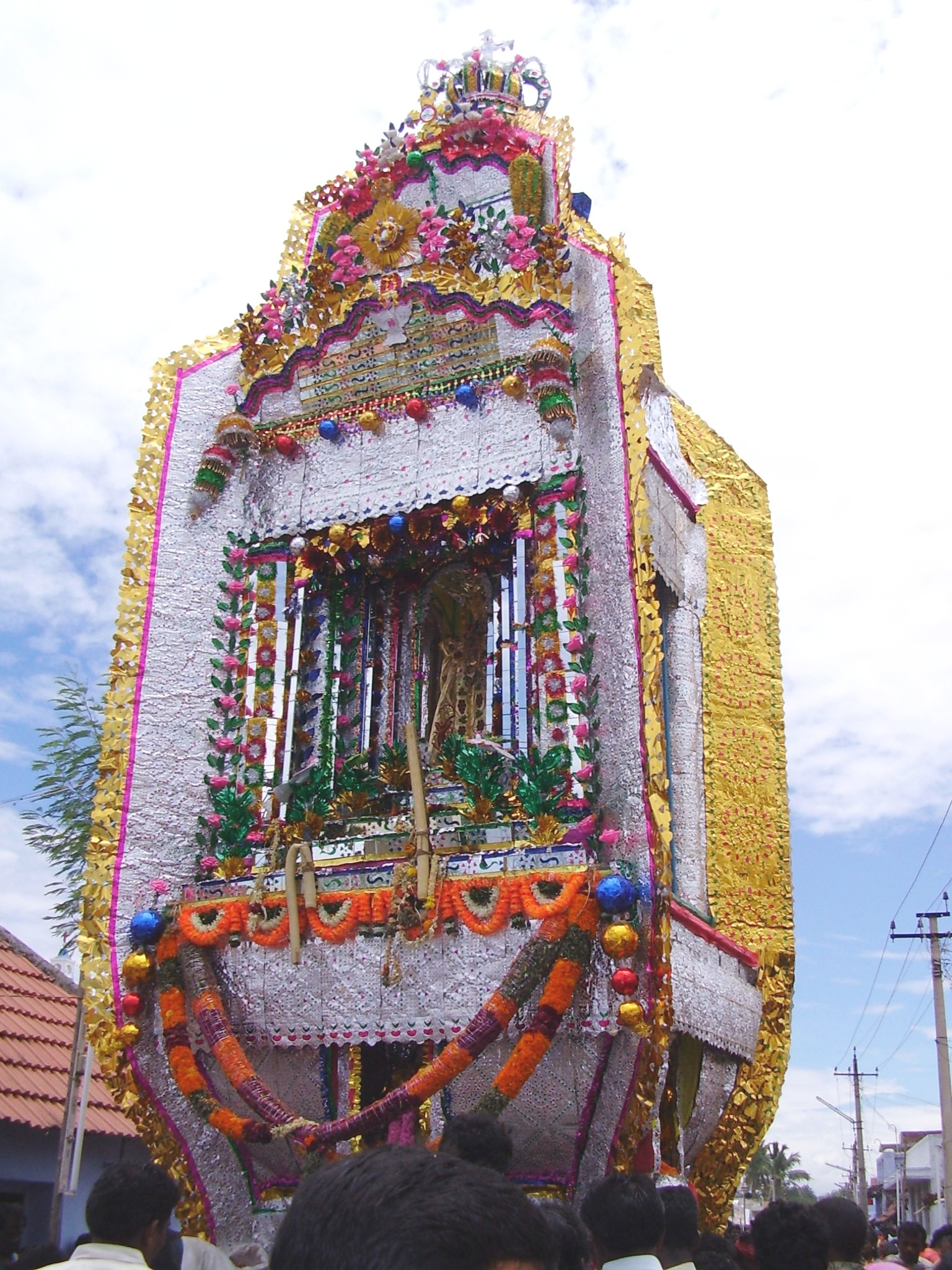
The car procession on the feast day

The feast day recognizing Mary's passage into Heaven is celebrated as the Feast of the Assumption of the Blessed Virgin Mary every year on 15 August there. The feast is preceded by hoisting of the flag on 6 August and ends with a Eucharistic procession around the village on 15 August evening. During these ten days of the feast, about 2 to 4 lakhs of pilgrims visit the church. The traditional Car Procession around the village with the miraculous statue of Our Lady of Assumption is the highlight of the feast. The car procession starts with a special Holy Mass on 14 August midnight and ends with a public procession of the Eucharist on 15 August evening.There is a ancestors acceptance that the statue is from Manila and which is brought by st.xavierand it was travelled through sea by Italian sisters.

== Notable Borns ==
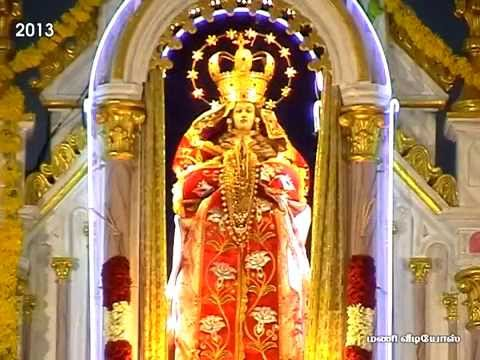

1. Swamyadiyar Thirupappu Nadar (Veera Thuravi), the Crown Prince of Ezhasa Naadu, led Maravan Regiment from Pandiyas to the Travancore Kingdom (then Vaenaadu). During the 18th century, he converted St. Thomas Christians in the area to the Roman Catholic Rite, and had additionally created new Roman Catholic Villages in the area. He kept Maravankudieruppu as his base, and was buried there in 1838.
2. Bishop Manuel Visuvasam† - Born on 18 Jun 1916, Ordained as Priest on 22 Dec 1941, ordained as Bishop of Coimbatore, India on 3 May 1972, Deceased on 2 Jun 1979
3. Professor M J XAVIER director Indian Institute of Management, Ranchi and Fellow (IIM, Calcutta)

== Institutions ==
Schools

1. Govt Higher Secondary School
2. St. Aloysius Higher Secondary School
3. Mother Terasa Primary school

Banks

1. Bank of India
2. Co-operative Society Bank
3. Maravankudieruppu.com

== Transportation ==
Kamanayakkanpatti lies on Kovilpatti-Pasuvanthanai road. Kamanayakkanpatti is well connected with Kovilpatti, Thoothukudi, Tirunelveli, Chennai, Madurai, Tiruchendur, Pulliampatti, Eppothum Vendran, Pasuvanthanai, Puthiyampuththur, Kayaththar and other villages through numerous bus routes. Nearest Railway station is Kovilpatti. The nearest Domestic airport is Tuticorin Airport, and the nearest International airport is Madurai International Airport.
