= Culture of Chennai =

The culture of Chennai, popularly called the "Gateway to the South India", refers to the music, dance, and art forms that originated and are practiced in the city.

== Music, dance and drama ==
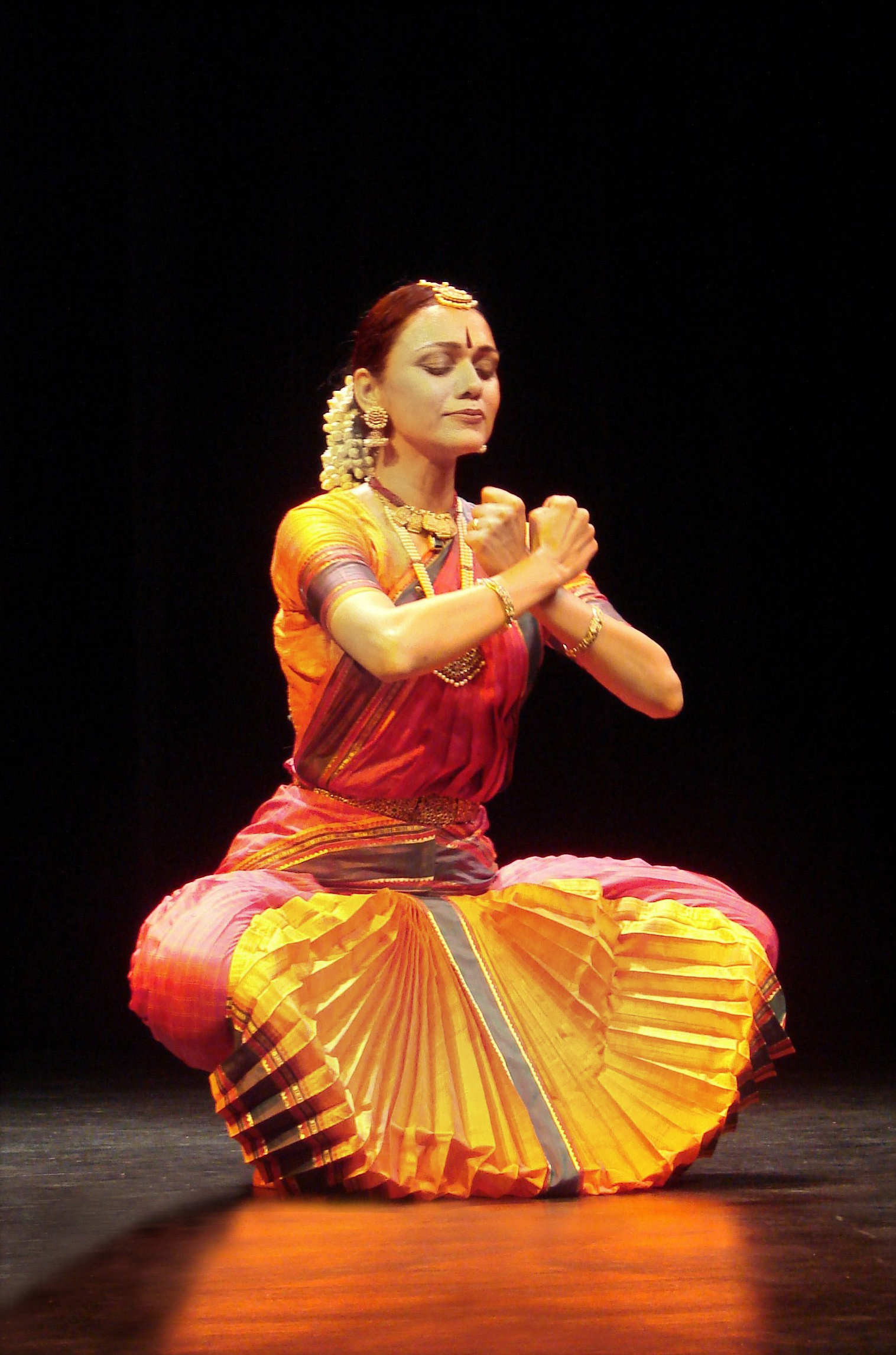
A Bharata natyam concert

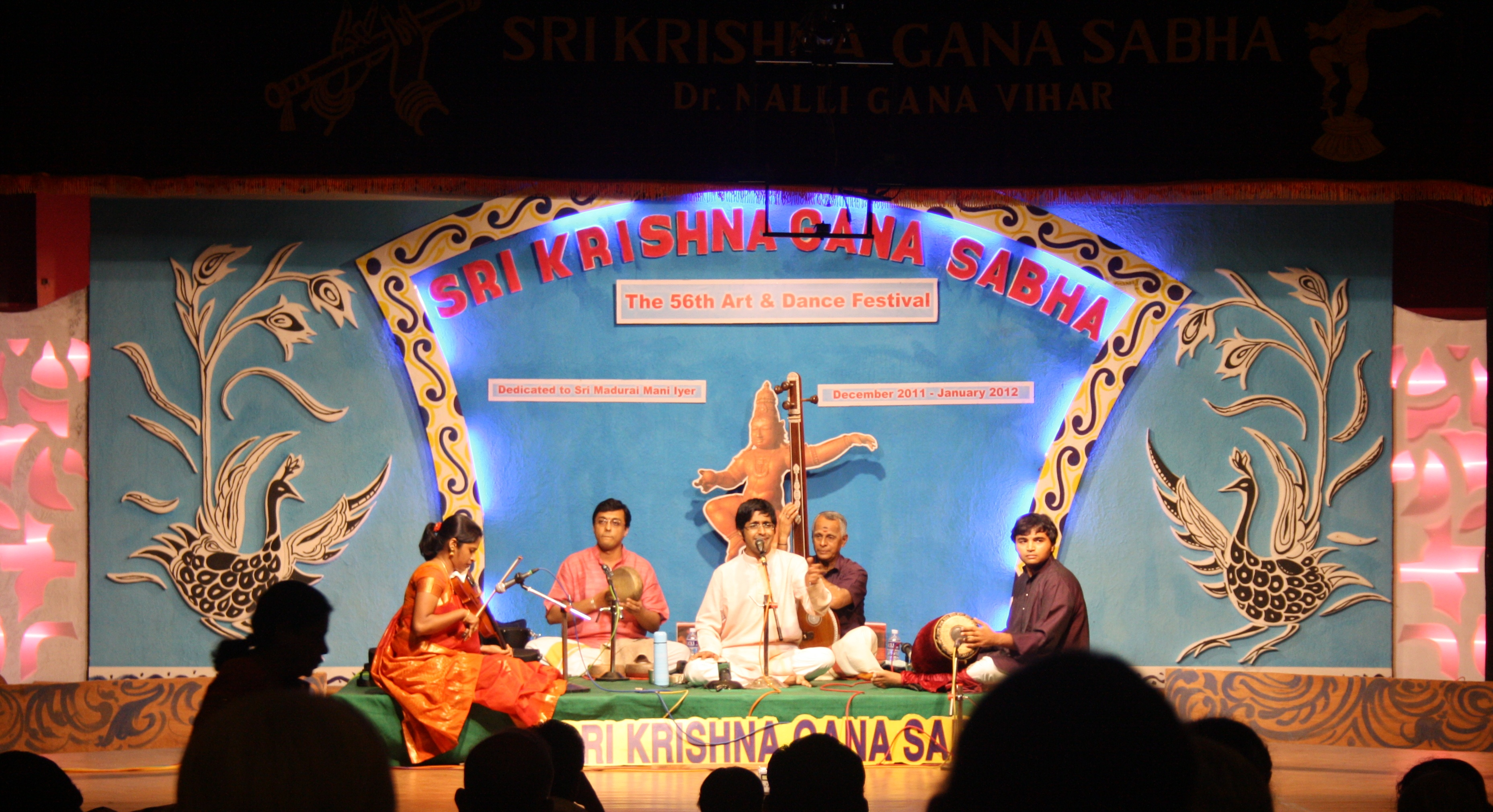
Carnatic music concert at Sri Krishna Gana Sabha

The city is known for its classical music. Every December, Chennai holds a five-week Music Season, during the Tamil month of Mārgaḻi, featuring performances (kacheries) of Carnatic music by hundreds of artists in and around the city.

Chennai is also known for the classical Indian dance, the Bharatanatyam, which is also the official dance of Tamil Nadu. An important cultural centre for Bharatanatyam is Kalakshetra (Sanskrit for "place of the arts"), located on the beach in the south of the city.

Although Chennai is the epicentre for Carnatic music and Bharatanatyam, the audience and performers primarily belong to the upper class, excluding most of the city's population. The film director Pa. Ranjith's Neelam Panpaattu Maiyam started an annual music festival, Margazhiyil Makkal Isai ("people's music in Margazhi"), in 2020 to showcase musicians and dance artists predominantly from marginalised communities. Music such as oppari, parai, thappaattam, gaana, naattuppuram, and themmangu is performed.

In 2007, much before Margazhiyil Makkalisai, Chennai Sangamam, a Tamil cultural festival, was started with similar goals of democratising traditional artforms. Usually held around the Pongal festival, in January, the event showcases artforms like Thappattam, Karakattam, Devarattam, Kaniyan Koothu, Kavadi Aattam, Thodar Nadanam, Amba Paatu, Villupaatu, and Sakkaikuchiyattam. It was discontinued for ten years, from 2012, during the AIADMK regime, and restarted in 2021. In addition to Tamil-Dravidian art forms, the 2024 edition featured artistes from Odisha, West Bengal and Punjab showcasing their traditional and tribal music and dance too.

Chennai has a vibrant theatre scene, with a large number of Tamil plays being performed. Political satire, slapstick comedy, history, mythology and drama are some of the popular genres of Tamil plays. Prominent theatre personalities include Pammal Sambanda Mudaliar, K.S. Nagarajan, Cho Ramaswamy, Indira Parthasarathy, R.S. Manohar, N. Muthuswamy, English theatre is also popular in Chennai. Evam, a popular English theatre company is based in Chennai and they are the logistics partners of The Metroplus Theatre festival, held by a leading newspaper of the city, The Hindu, every year around July and August. A number of other English theatre companies like Unarviyam, Stray Factory, Theatre Y, ASAP productions, Still Water Productions, Boardwalkers, Masquerade - the performance group, Theatre Nisha, Alchemy Theatres, Rebelz, Stagefright Productions and last but not the least, India's oldest English theatre company, Madras Players stage plays throughout the year. Over the last four years, Chennai has become active in theatre activities. School and college cultural festivals (locally called culfests) play an important role by providing platforms for the city's youth to indulge in art and culture. These culfests attract participants from around India. Some of the larger culfests in the city are Instincts (SSN College of Engineering), Saarang (IITM), Techofes (College of Engineering, Guindy), Deep Woods (MCC), Kalakrithi (ACT), Mitafest (MIT) Down Sterling (Loyola) and Srishti (Ethiraj College for Women, 'Alchemy Kids Theatre Annual Graduation').

In the mid-2000's, western style bands began to grow in popularity. Predominantly these are 'student bands', although there are professional bands such as The LBG. While the student bands are most visible in cultural fests and other competitions, pro-events like the June Rock Out, organised by the Unwind Centre, are dominated by professional bands.

The mylapore webportal dedicated to Arts & Culture of Chennai, music, drama, awards and events.

== Cinema ==
Chennai is the base for the large Tamil movie industry, known as Kollywood. The industry is, especially, attributed to the locality of Kodambakkam, where most of the movie studios are located. The industry makes about 100 Tamil movies a year, and its film soundtracks dominate the music scene in the city. Kollywood is the second-biggest revenue-generating movie industry in India, only after Bollywood. Tamil movies and personalities are followed worldwide. Some of the most technologically advanced movie studios in India are located in Chennai. Chennai also conducts movie fairs every year, attracting movies from worldwide. The Chennai film industry produced the first nationally distributed film across India in 1948 with Chandralekha. They have one of the widest overseas distributions, with large audience turnouts from the Tamil diaspora. They are distributed to various parts of Asia, Africa, Western Europe, North America and Oceania. It is estimated by the Manorama Yearbook 2000 (a popular almanac) that over 5,000 Tamil films were produced in the 20th century.

== People ==
The majority of residents in Chennai are native Tamilians and descendants of settlers from different part of Tamil Nadu. There are also sizeable migrant Malayalee, Telungu, Sri Lankan Tamil communities in the city. A regional hub since British times, other prominent communities are the Anglo Indian, Bengali, Punjabi, Gujarati and Marwari communities and people from Uttar Pradesh and Bihar. Chennai also has a growing expatriate population especially from the United States, Europe and East Asia who work in the industries and IT centres.

Tamil is the city's first language. English is spoken widely in South Chennai and Central Chennai, (Kanchipuram and Chennai districts) and is used almost exclusively in business, education and other white collar professions. Tamil spoken in Chennai uses English words liberally, so much so that it is often called Madras bhashai (Tamil for "Madras language"). Other languages spoken in the city include Telugu, Malayalam and Urdu and they contribute to the vocabulary of Madras bhashai as well.

Chennai celebrates a number of festivals. Pongal, celebrated in the month of January, is the most important festival of and is celebrated over a period of five days. Pongal has been designated the "State Festival" for its unique celebration that is typical of Tamil Nadu. Though a harvest festival it is still celebrated widely in the city. Tamil New Year's Day signifying the beginning of the Tamil calendar usually falls on 14 April and is celebrated widely. Being a cosmopolitan city, almost all major religious festivals like Deepavali, Eid and Christmas are celebrated here.

== See also ==
- Religion in Chennai
