= IBG =

IBG may refer to:

- Ibogainalog (IBG), a serotonergic psychedelic and psychoplastogen
- Ibanag language (ISO 639 language code ibg), an Austronesian language found in the Philippines
- Idaho Botanical Garden, Boise, Idaho, USA
- Indiana Botanic Gardens, a U.S. herbal products retailer
- Institute for Behavioral Genetics, University of Colorado Boulder, Boulder, Colorado, USA
- Institute of Bio- and Geosciences (IBG), Forschungszentrum Jülich, Germany
- The Institute of British Geographers, now part of the Royal Geographical Society
- Insurance-backed guarantee; a type of secured warranty/guarantee; see Double Glazing & Conservatory Ombudsman Scheme
- Intel Boot Guard, a security mechanism implemented in some Intel processors
- Integrated Battle Groups of the Indian Army
- Interbank GIRO (IBG), a mechanism of money transfer
- The International Brewers Guild, which merged with the Institute of Brewing to form the Institute of Brewing and Distilling
- Investment Bank of Greece, a bank in Greece
- Springfield Air (ICAO airline code IBG); see List of airline codes (S)

== See also ==
- LBG (disambiguation)
