= Street food of Chennai =

Food sold by street vendors in Chennai, India

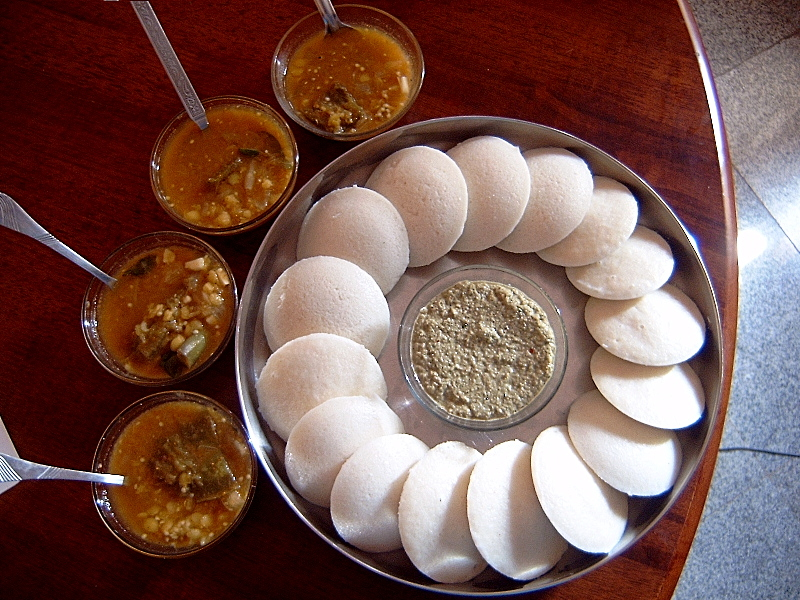
Idli and sambar, a common dish in Chennai

Street food, as in other areas of India, is popular in Chennai, despite the common belief in India that street food is unhealthy. The idly sambhar is a popular dish, which is served as breakfast or dinner. Apart from regular South Indian street food, the city's streets are also filled with several North Indian street food outlets, most of them established by North Indian migrants themselves. Gujarati and Burmese are also available. Street food in Chennai is so popular that a game had developed based on the TV show The Amazing Race requiring contestants to follow clues to street-food spots in the city.

== Varieties ==
=== Idli sambhar ===
Idli sambhar is made by steaming batter consisting of fermented de-husked black lentils and rice. Sambhar is a lentil-based vegetable stew or chowder based on a broth made with tamarind, common in South Indian and Sri Lankan Tamil cuisines.

It is also served with coconut chutney.

=== Dosa ===
A dosa (plural: dosai) is a pancake made from a fermented batter. It is somewhat similar to a crêpe but its main ingredients are rice and black gram. Dosai are a typical part of the South Indian diet but are known all over the Indian subcontinent. Masala dosa is served hot along with sambar, stuffed with potato masala (aloo masala) or paneer masala and chutney. It can be consumed with idli podi as well.

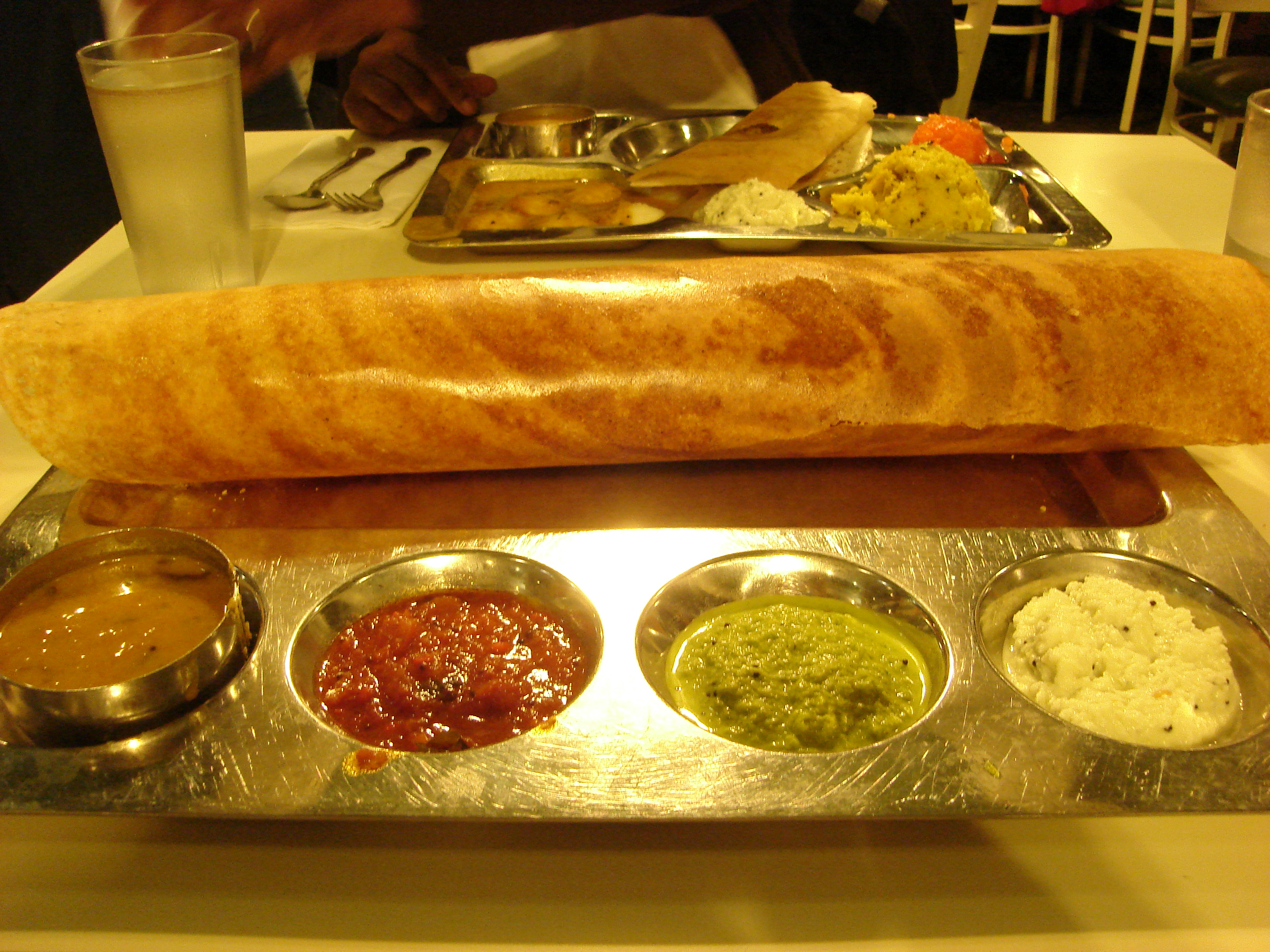
Dosai and chutney, Hotel Saravana Bhavan

=== Uttapam ===
Uttapam or ooththappam or uthappa (Tamil: ஊத்தாப்பம் ) is a dosa-like dish made by cooking ingredients in a batter. Unlike a dosa, which is crisp and crepe-like, uttapam is a thick pancake, with toppings cooked right into the batter. Uttapam is traditionally made with toppings such as tomatoes, onion, chillies, capsicum and cabbage mix; other common choices are coconut or mixed vegetables. It is often eaten with sambar or chutney.

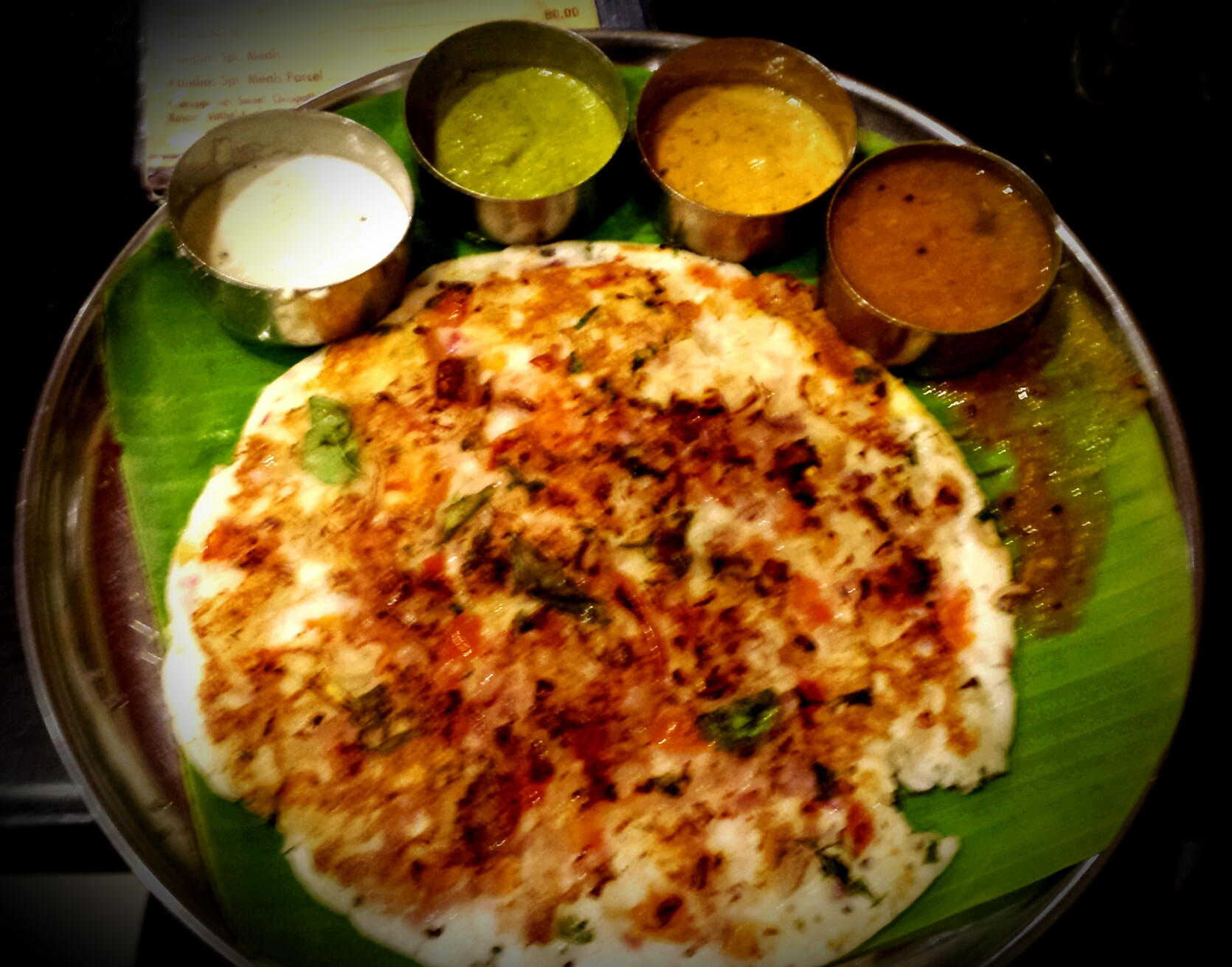
Onion–tomato uttapam

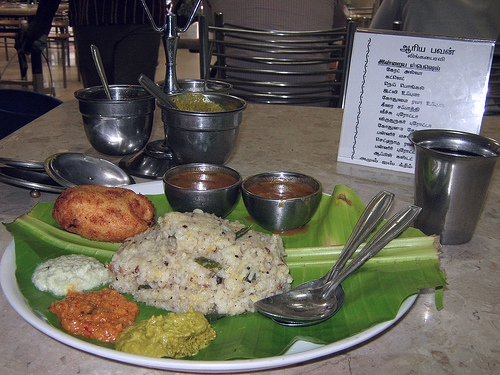
Pongal with chutney, sambar, vada

=== Paniyaram ===
Kuzhi paniyaram (Tamil: குழி பணியாரம்), or gunta ponganalu (Telugu: గుంట పొంగణాలు), or paddu, guliappa, or yeriyappa (Kannada:ಪಡ್ಡು/ಗುಳಿಯಪ್ಪ/ಎರಿಯಪ್ಪ), is an Indian dish made by steaming batter using a semi-spherical mould. The batter is made of black lentils and rice and is similar in composition to the batter used to make idli and dosa. The dish can be made sweet or spicy by addition of, respectively, jaggery and chillies. Paniyaram is made on a special pan that comes with multiple small fissures.

=== Vada ===
Vada [vəɽɑː] is a common term for many different types of savoury fried snacks from India. Different types of vadas can be described variously as fritters, doughnuts, or dumplings. Alternative names for this food include wada, vade, vadai, wadeh and bara. The various types of vadas are made from different ingredients, ranging from legumes (such as medu vada of South India) to potatoes (such as batata vada of West India). They are often eaten as breakfast or snack, and also used in other food preparations (such as dahi vada and vada pav).

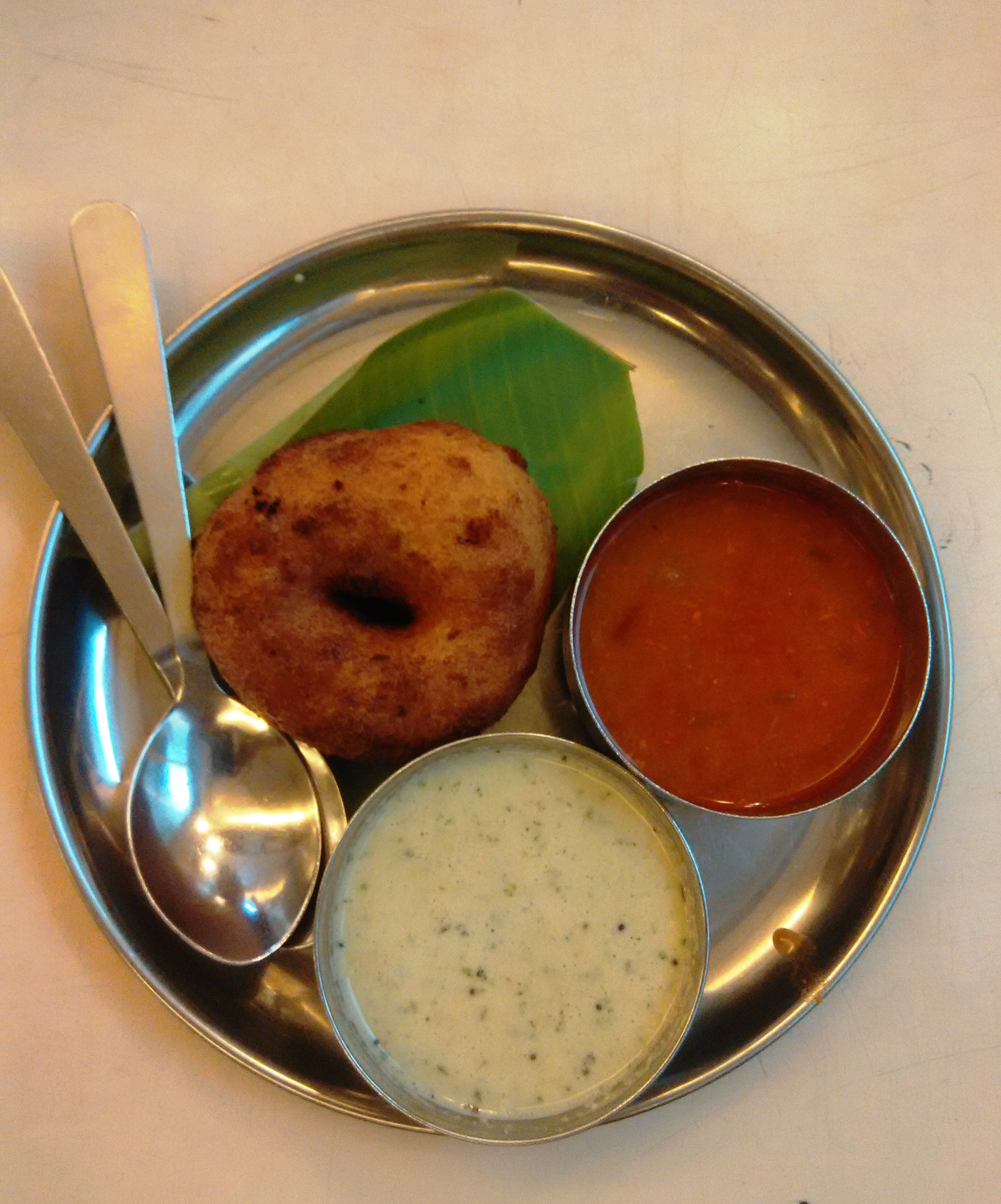
Vada sambar chutney

=== Bhaji ===
A bhaji, bhajji or bajji is a spicy snack or entrée similar to a fritter. It is often served with chutney.

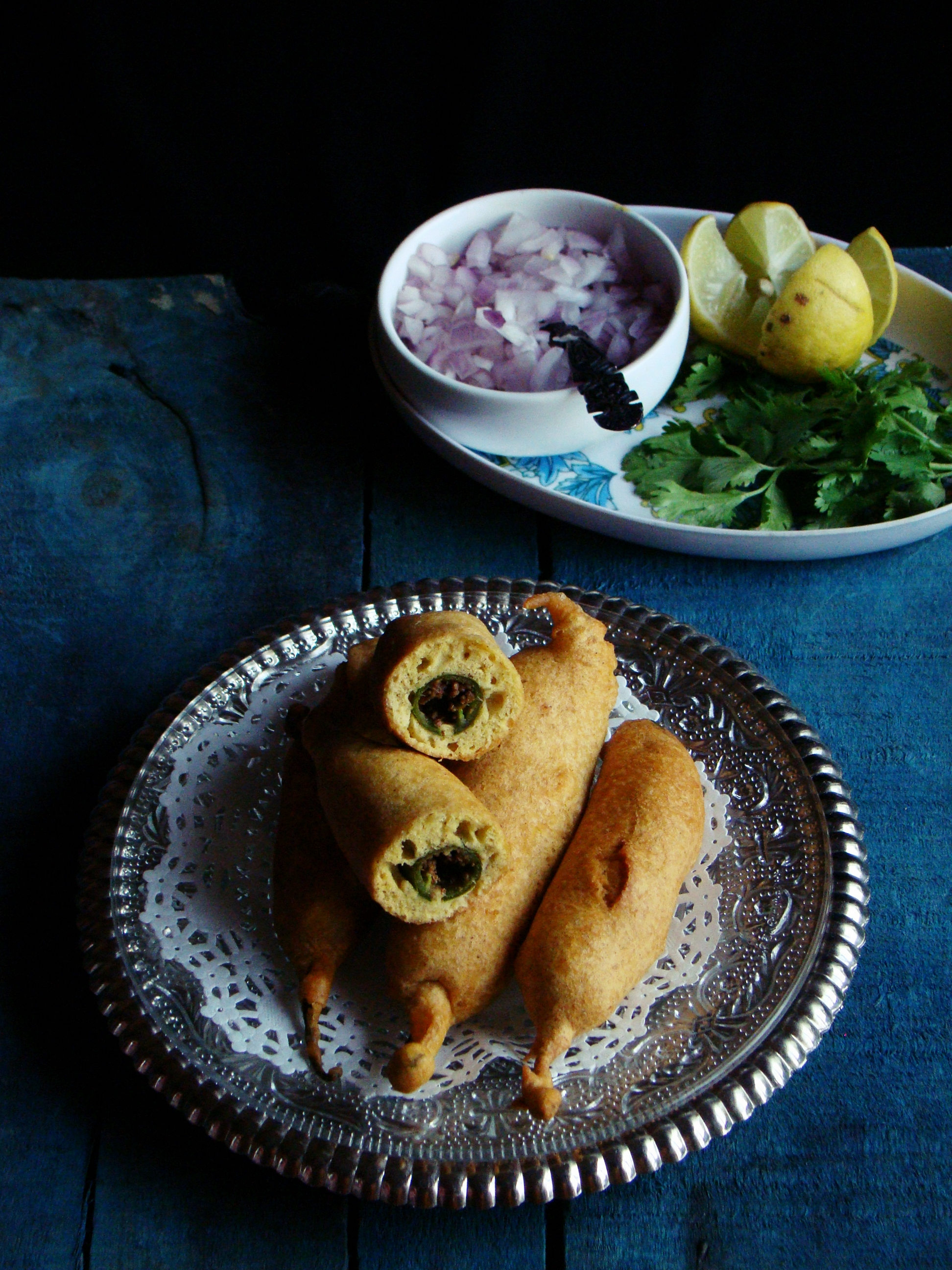
Milagaai bajji or chilli bhajji

=== Boli ===
Boli in Tamil Nadu is a golden yellow sweet pancake from South India. It is eaten during a traditional Sadhya along with Pasam. Several varieties of boli are prepared including thenga (coconut) boli and jaggery, sugar. Boli is especially famous in the southernmost districts of Tamil Nadu and Kerala, India and northern Sri Lanka. Boli is eaten mostly after lunch or as an evening snack. Boli is golden yellow in colour.

=== Jigarthanda ===
Jigarthanda is a cold milk beverage and cold dessert that originated in the South Indian city of Madurai in Tamil Nadu. It translates to "cool heart" in English. It is generally prepared and served at roadside stalls as a refreshment during the Indian summer. The basic ingredients include milk, almond gum, sarsaparilla root syrup, sugar and ice-cream.

=== Parotta ===
A parotta, porotta or barotta, is a layered flat bread of parts of Southern India, notably in Tamil Nadu and Kerala made from maida flour. This is a similar to the North Indian Lacha paratha. Parottas are usually available as street food and in restaurants across Kerala, Tamil Nadu and parts of Karnataka. At some places it is also served at weddings, religious festivals and feasts. It is prepared by kneading maida, egg (in some recipes), oil or ghee and water. The dough is beaten into thin layers and later forming a round spiralled into a ball using these thin layers. The ball is rolled flat and roasted. There is one more special dish made out of parotta called Kothu parotta or mutta parotta which is widely available in mostly all Chennai hotels serving parottas.

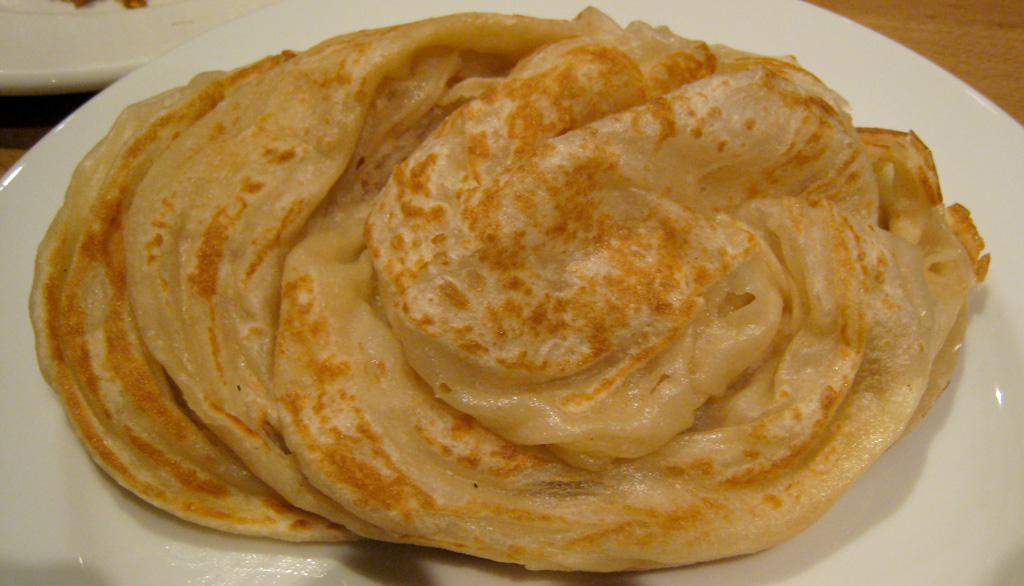
Parotta

=== Kothu parotta ===
It is a popular dish in small countryside hotels. The idea is to make the hard chewing parotta and also ease eating using only right hand. It is prepared by cutting regular poratha into pieces and mixing it with egg, onion, green chillies and garam masala. It is also normally made of leftover parotta and is famously had with alcoholic drinks.

=== Chili parotha ===
It is a variation of paratha which is popular as dinner. It is prepared by cutting the parotha into small pieces and frying it in pan with lot of chilli powder, tomatoes, capsicums & onions, the dish usually appears in bright red colour and parotha roasted as chip crisp.

=== Chapati ===
Chapatis are made using a soft dough comprising Atta flour, salt and water. Atta is made from hard Gehun (Indian wheat, or durum). It is more finely ground than most western-style wholewheat flours. Traditionally, roti (and rice) are prepared without salt to provide a bland background for spiced dishes.

=== Idiyappam ===
Idiyappam, or string hoppers, is a traditional Tamil, Kerala, Kodava, Tulu and Sri Lankan food consisting of rice flour pressed into noodle form and then steamed. Idiyappam is served with korma or Coconut milk.

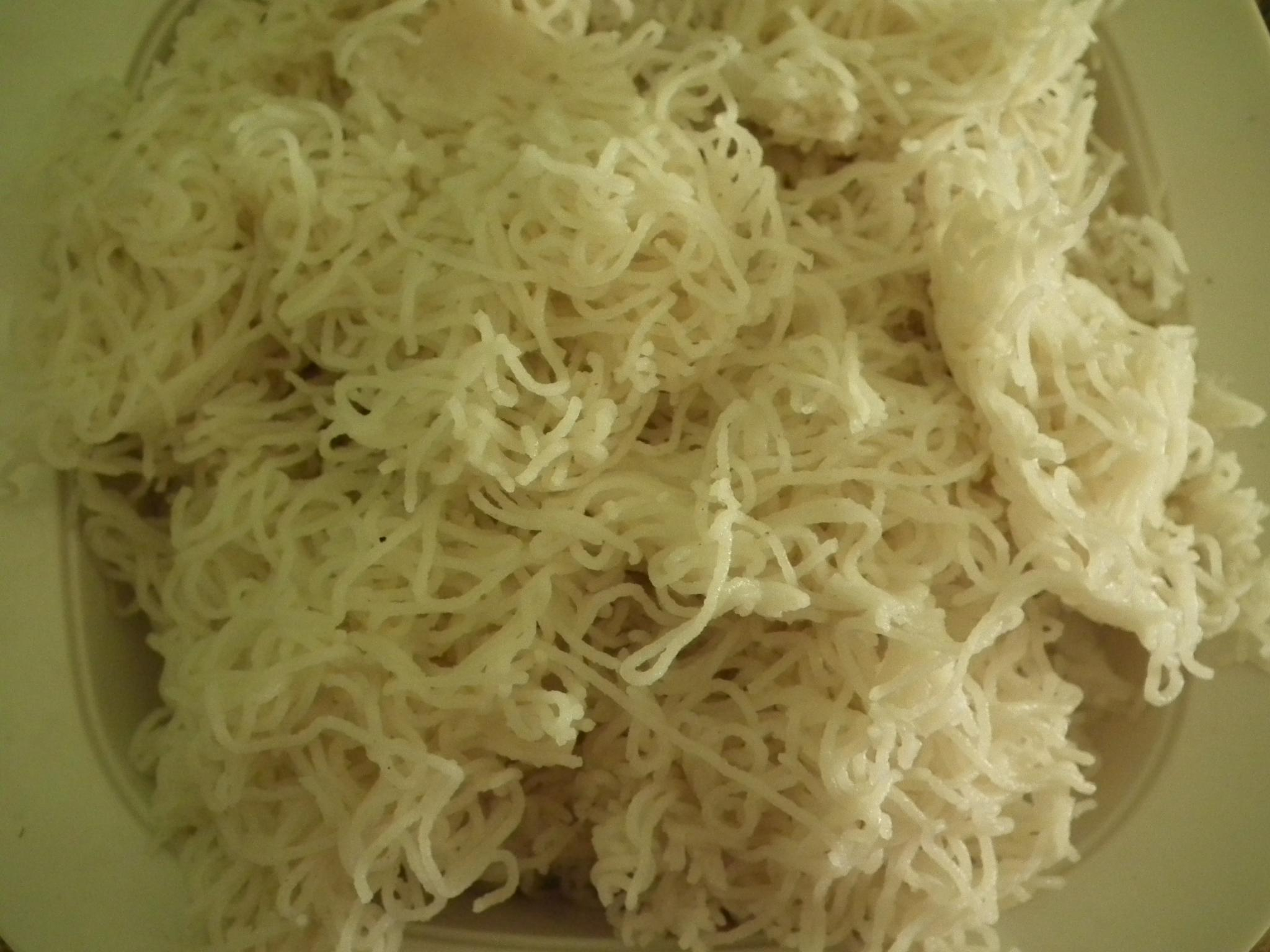
Idiyappam

=== Biriyani ===
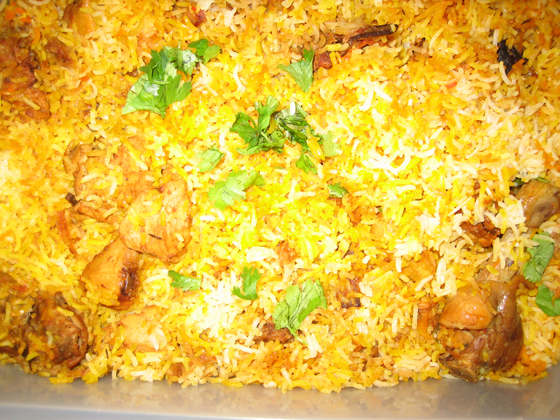
Biriyani

Biriyani is a hugely popular food in Chennai. It is a mixed rice food with meat. Variants include Chicken Biriyani, Mutton Biriyani, Egg Biriyani, Vegetarian Biryani, Beef Biriyani etc. Biryani is popular amongst Muslims, and so there is a theory that the Mughals brought it with them. Kushkas are Biriyanis without meat or meat removed from rice. Biryani is usually served with sour brinjal gravy (Baghara baingan) and chilled raita.

=== Kulfi ===
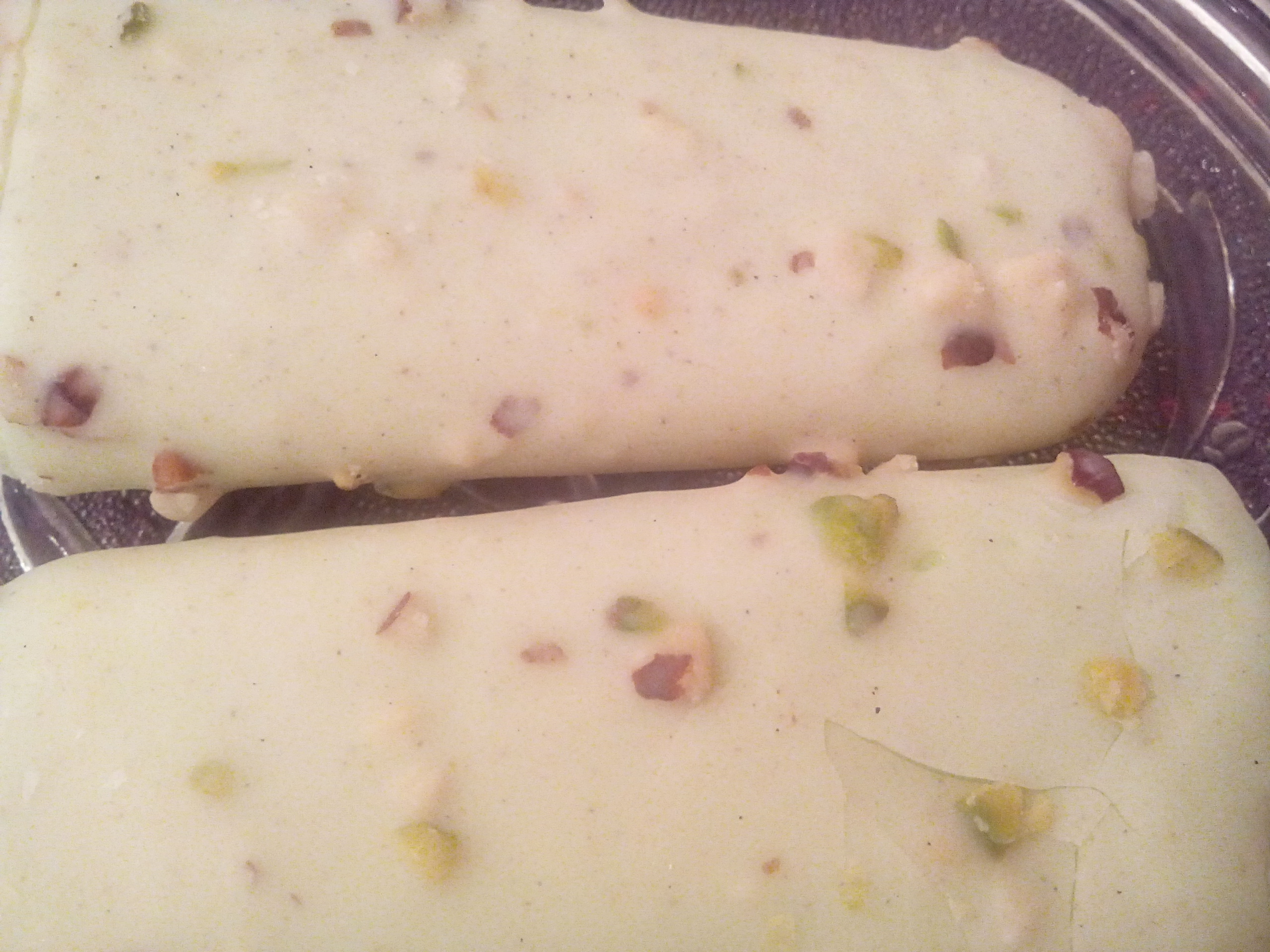
Pista Kulfi

Kulfi has similarities to ice cream in appearance and taste; however it is denser and creamier. It comes in various flavours. The more traditional ones are cream (malai), rose, mango, cardamom (elaichi), saffron (kesar or zafran), and pistachio.

=== Atho ===
Chennai has a vibrant Tamil Community who migrated from Burma. They have introduced lots of Burmese Foods to Chennai. Atho is one of the famous street foods in Chennai.

=== Others ===
Several other street food varieties thrive in Chennai, including:

- Kalaan or mushroom
- Masala puri, made with Puffed rice, Peas, Corn flakes and Masala (Some times small, crunchy Puris are added)

== See also ==
- Culture of Chennai
- Indian cuisine
- Street food of Kolkata
- Street food of Mumbai
- Indian fast food
