= Holy Redeemer Church =

Holy Redeemer Church may refer to:

== Belize ==
- Holy Redeemer Cathedral

== India ==
- Basilica of the Holy Redeemer, Tiruchirappalli

== Ireland ==
- Holy Redeemer Church, Bray

== Thailand ==
- Holy Redeemer Church, Bangkok

== United Kingdom ==
- Holy Redeemer Church, York
- Our Most Holy Redeemer, Clerkenwell, London
- Church of Our Most Holy Redeemer and St Thomas More, Chelsea, London

== United States ==
- Most Holy Redeemer Church, San Francisco
- Most Holy Redeemer (Manhattan)
- Old Holy Redeemer Catholic Church (Kissimmee, Florida)
- Most Holy Redeemer Church (Detroit, Michigan)
- Holy Redeemer Church (Eagle Harbor, Michigan)
- Holy Redeemer College (Oakland, California), built as a seminary in 1925.
