= LBG =

LBG can refer to:

- Lake Burley Griffin, an artificial lake in the centre of Canberra
- Landenberg, Pennsylvania
- Laurinburg, North Carolina
- Limbe Botanic Garden
- Linde–Buzo–Gray algorithm, an algorithm to derive a good codebook for vector quantization
- Lindesberg, a Swedish town
- Liquid biogas
- Lloyds Banking Group
- Location based game
- Locust bean gum, a galactomannan vegetable gum
- London Bridge station, in the UK National Rail code
- Louis Béland-Goyette, a Canadian soccer player
- Lyman-break galaxy
- Paris–Le Bourget Airport, IATA airport code
- The LBG, a rock band from Chennai, India
