= Dara Phiroze Chinoy =

Retired Indian Air Force Group Captain

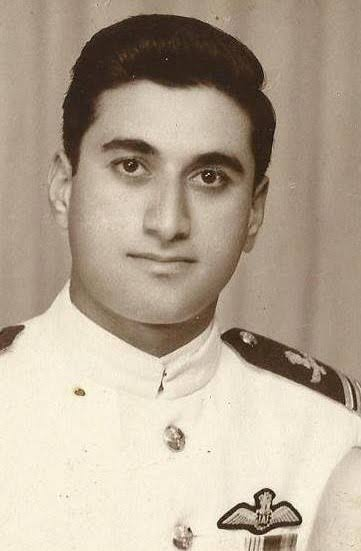
- Born: 1944 (age 81–82); Vijayawada, Andhra Pradesh, India
- Died: 21 July 2026 (aged 81)
- Military career
- Allegiance: India
- Branch: Indian Air Force
- Service years: 1963–1990
- Rank: Group Captain
- Units: No. 32 Squadron IAF; No. 30 Squadron IAF; Flying Instructors School
- Commands: Commanding Officer, No. 30 Squadron
- Conflicts: Indo-Pakistani War of 1965
- Awards: Vishisht Seva Medal
- Other work: Civilian pilot Author

Dara Phiroze Chinoy (born 1944) is a retired Indian Air Force Group Captain and war veteran, known for his escape from enemy territory during the Indo-Pakistani War of 1965. As the only Indian officer in recorded military history to successfully evade capture after ejecting over Pakistan, Chinoy was awarded the Vishisht Seva Medal for his bravery and continued service. He later chronicled his experiences in the memoir Escape from Pakistan: A War Hero's Chronicle (2023).

== Early life ==
Chinoy was born in 1944 in Vijayawada, Andhra Pradesh, to a Parsi family. While studying at Loyola College, he joined the Air Wing of the National Cadet Corps, igniting his passion for aviation. Despite initial family resistance, he enrolled in the 83rd Pilots Course in 1961 and was commissioned as a Flying Officer on 9 March 1963, earning his wings two years later.

== Military career ==
Chinoy served 27 years in the Indian Air Force, rising to the rank of Group Captain by 1985. His postings included roles as a flying instructor at the Flying Instructors School in Tambaram (1973–1976 and 1979–1980), where he later served as Chief Flying Instructor. From 1977 to 1979, he trained pilots for the Iraqi Air Force in Tikrit.

He commanded No. 30 Squadron at Tezpur from 1983 to 1984 and held the position of Joint Director (Offensive Operations) at Air Headquarters in Delhi. Chinoy retired voluntarily on 31 January 1990.

During his career, he survived multiple ejections: one from an Ouragan fighter in 1964 due to engine failure while with No. 29 Squadron, another from a Mystère IVa in 1965 during the war, and a third from a MiG-21 in 1987 after a bird strike.

== Indo-Pakistani War of 1965 ==
On 10 September 1965, at age 20, Chinoy flew a low-level strike mission in a Mystère IVa from Adampur air base, targeting Pakistani artillery near the Ichogil Canal in Lahore sector. His aircraft was hit by anti-aircraft fire, forcing him to eject over enemy territory in Pakistani Punjab. Landing in a sugarcane field amid gunfire, Chinoy evaded capture for over five hours by zigzagging through fields, destroying sensitive documents, and crossing the canal under darkness, despite dehydration and exhaustion.

Initially detained by Indian troops who mistook him for an enemy, he was verified and returned to base, resuming combat sorties. He completed 10 operational missions during the war.

Chinoy's escape is described as legendary, outwitting Pakistani forces in a rare successful evasion by an Indian pilot.

== Later career ==
Post-retirement, Chinoy continued flying as a civilian pilot for over two decades, logging extensive hours with corporate clients including the Tatas and Ambanis. His career spanned nearly 49 years in aviation.

== Personal life ==
Chinoy is married to Margaret "Margie" Chinoy. In his memoir, he candidly discusses personal challenges, including his wife's battle with schizophrenia and his elder son's struggle with drug addiction.

== Awards ==
• Vishisht Seva Medal (1 January 1966)

== Bibliography ==
- Escape from Pakistan: A War Hero’s Chronicle (Om Books International, 2023) ISBN 978-93-92834-74-5
