= Basilica of the Holy Redeemer, Tiruchirappalli =

Basilica of the Most Holy Redeemer
- உலக மீட்டர் ேபராலையம் திருச்சி
- Basilica of the Most Holy Redeemer
- 10.8103°N 78.6980°E
- Location: Tiruchirappalli, Tamil Nadu
- Country: India
- Denomination: Roman Catholic
- Website: http://holyredeemersbasilica.org

History
- Status: Minor Basilica
- Founded: 9 February 1880
- Consecrated: 29 June 1881

Architecture
- Functional status: active
- Designated: 12 October 2006

Administration
- Diocese: Tiruchirappalli

Clergy
- Bishop: MOST REV.DR.S.AROKIARAJ
- Rector: REV.FR.T.ALBERT
- Priest: REV.FR.A.SAGAYARAJ (Administrator)

The Basilica of the Holy Redeemer and Our Lady of Perpetual Help, Tiruchirappalli is one of ten Roman Catholic minor basilicas in the southern state of Tamil Nadu, India.

== History ==
The origins of the basilica can be traced to the early decades of the 17th century, when Jesuit missionaries began spreading Christianity through the Madurai Mission. The first conversions occurred in the area known as Tiruchirappalli, also called "Trichy", in 1616. The missionaries eventually got support from the Hindu Naicker rulers of Madurai. The many Jesuit missionaries who worked in the Madurai Mission included Robert de Nobili and Constanzo Beschi.

While Trichy was still a mission station of the Madurai Mission, several Christian communities were established in Palakkarai, Dharmanathapuram, and Varaganeri. Even before the construction of the Holy Redeemer Church, there were some 7500 Christians in the area. They worshiped at the St. Mary's Cathedral, Trichy, rather than at Our Lady of Sorrows because the latter was under the administration of the Portuguese Padroado.

Realizing the need for the Christians of Palakkarai to have a church of their own, Bishop Alexis Canoz, S.J. laid the foundation for a new church on 9 February 1880. The church of the Most Holy Redeemer was consecrated on 29 June 1881 by the Vicar Apostolic of Pondicherry, Msgr. François-Jean-Marie Laouënan, M.E.P.

The land for the construction of the church was a gift from the local ruler, Diwan Kanjamalai Mudaliar.

== Devotion to Our Lady of Perpetual Help ==
In 1957 the novena devotion to Our Lady of Perpetual Help was introduced by the parish priest, Rev. A. Thomas, after a parish mission conducted by the Redemptorist priest Rev. Francis. The devotion has continued till the present as hundreds of devotees, Christian and non-Christian, gather to pray on Wednesdays.

== Minor basilica ==
Pope Benedict XVI raised the church of the Most Holy Redeemer to the dignity of a minor basilica on 12 October 2006. The request for the elevation of the church to a basilica was presented to the Vatican by the Bishop of Trichy, Most Rev. Antony Devotee while Rev. A. Gabriel was the parish priest.

== Art and architecture ==
The inner walls of this church are adorned with oil paintings of the saints and scenes from the Old and New Testaments.

== Bishops of Tiruchirapalli Diocese ==
- Bishop Alexis Canoz, S.J. 1846–1888
- Bishop John Barthe, S.J. 1888–1913
- Bishop Ange-August Faisandier, S.J. 1913–1936
- Bishop John Peter Leonard, S.J. 1936–1938
- Bishop James Mendonça 1938–1970
- Bishop Thomas Fernando 1971–1990
- Bishop Lawrence Gabriel 1990–1997
- Msgr. Vincent Mathias (administrator) 1997–1999
- Bishop Peter Fernando 2000–2001
- Bishop Anthony Devotta 2001–2018
- Bishop.Devadoss Ambrose (administrator) 2018-2021
- Bishop Savarimuthu Arockia Raj 2021–

== See also ==
- Cathedral
- Duomo
- List of basilicas
- Roman architecture
- Tiruchirapalli
