= Loyola Institute of Business Administration =

Business School in Tamil Nadu, India

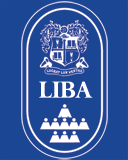
- Type: Self-financing business school
- Established: 1979; 47 years ago
- Founders: Fr. N. Casimir Raj S. J.
- Accreditation: SAQS
- Religious affiliation: Roman Catholic (Jesuit)
- Academic affiliations: AACSB
- Chairman: Fr. L. Jebamalai Irudayaraj, S.J.
- Dean: Dr. P.C. Lakshmi Narayanan (Dean – Academics); Dr. Deepa Ittimani Tholath (Dean – Research)
- Director: Fr. C. Joe Arun, S.J.
- Location: Chennai, Tamil Nadu, India; 13°03′49″N 80°14′06″E
- Nickname: LIBA
- Website: www.liba.edu

Loyola Institute of Business Administration (LIBA) is a private business school in Chennai, Tamil Nadu, India, was founded by the Society of Jesus (Jesuits) in 1979. It is situated on the Loyola College, Chennai, campus and run by the Loyola College Society.

== History ==
Loyola Institute of Business Administration (LIBA) when established in 1979 had a three-year, part-time PGDBM program catering to the needs of business executives in and around Chennai. This program was approved by the All India Council for Technical Education (AICTE). Since 1995 LIBA has offered a two-year, full-time PGDM program, approved by the AICTE and recognized as equivalent to an MBA degree by the Association of Indian Universities (AIU). LIBA also offers a full-time MBA (PGDM) program (2 years), part-time MBA (PGBM) program (3 years), various executive diploma courses, and certificate programs in various management subjects. It is a resource center for doctoral programs offered in affiliation with the University of Madras.

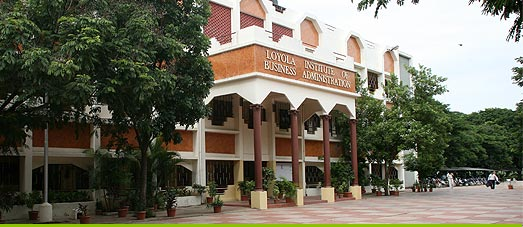
Main Block

== Centres of excellence ==
- Centre for Ethics and Governance
- Centre for Retail and Supply Chain Management
- Prof. C.K. Prahalad Centre for Emerging India

== See also ==
- List of Jesuit sites
