= Madura Mission =

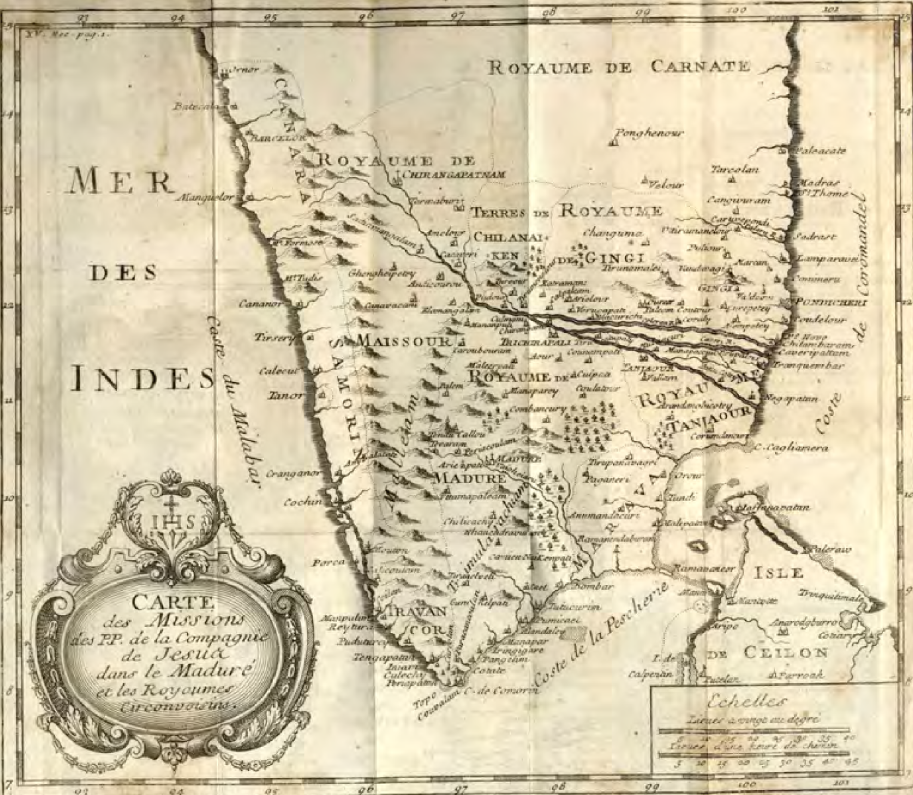
Map of the villages and residence of the Madurai Mission.

The Madurai Mission, or Madura Mission, (1606-1773/1937-1952) was a Jesuit mission founded in 1606 encompassing the south-eastern portion of the Indian peninsula around the Coromandel coast stretching from its tip to areas slightly north of the Vellar River although it would later lose parts of its jurisdiction to the Carnatic Mission in 1776. It was taken over by the previously mentioned mission following the dissolution of the Jesuits and was only reconstituted as a Jesuit mission again in 1929 before finally being made an independent Jesuit province in its own right in 1952. These two missions are known as the Old Madurai Mission (1606-1773) and the New Madurai Mission (1937-1952). The mission is distinguished from earlier Christian presence by being those related to and following in the steps of Roberto de Nobili in the city of Madurai itself and spreading out across the south east of the peninsula from that point.

== Background ==
The roots of the Madurai Mission predate its actual founding by almost a century. In 1517 the Paravars of the Pearl Fishery Coast converted en masse to Christianity as a group in order to gain the protection of the Portuguese crown from Arab traders and raiders. The Paravar population’s links with the Portuguese gave great importance to the Jesuits there, who were seen as a link with the Portuguese with whom local Indian powers could negotiate. However, for most of the 16th century, the Jesuits on the Coromandel coast had little interest in going further inland and remained on the coast with the Paravars .

This all began to change in the late 16th century during the reign of Venkata I of the Vijayanagar Empire who received the Jesuits courteously in 1593 and accepted their request to build a church and proselytise in Vijayanagar itself which gave confidence to the Jesuits regarding the possible expansion of their proselytising efforts into the interior of the subcontinent.

== Portuguese period ==
=== Beginnings ===
In 1574 Gonçalo Fernandes Tracoso, who had been a former soldier serving the Portuguese in Asia before joining the Jesuits and had been tending to the Paravars since 1560, followed some Paravar migrants to Madurai to take care of their spiritual needs. Madurai was the capital of the Madurai Kingdom, a vassal state of the Vijayanagar Empire in the South of the Indian peninsula, and was an important Brahmin centre both culturally and economically. Fernandes would later officially be assigned to Madurai following Muthuvirapa’s, the Nayak of Madurai, request for a Jesuit father at his court in exchange for land to build a church in 1595. Fernandez built a church of St. Mary as well as a school for poor children in Madurai and began his missionary work. However, he failed to convert a single person both due to his association with the low caste Paravars and the fact that he was a Frangui (a term for Western Europeans and closely associated with the Portuguese). When Fernandes attempted to talk to the Nayak of Madurai, he was bluntly told that if he was intending to convert people then he ought to leave and that he was not to speak of the ‘religion of the Frangui’. The failure of Fernandez to convert anyone led to Alberto Laerzio, the provincial official, to send Roberto de Nobili to replace him.

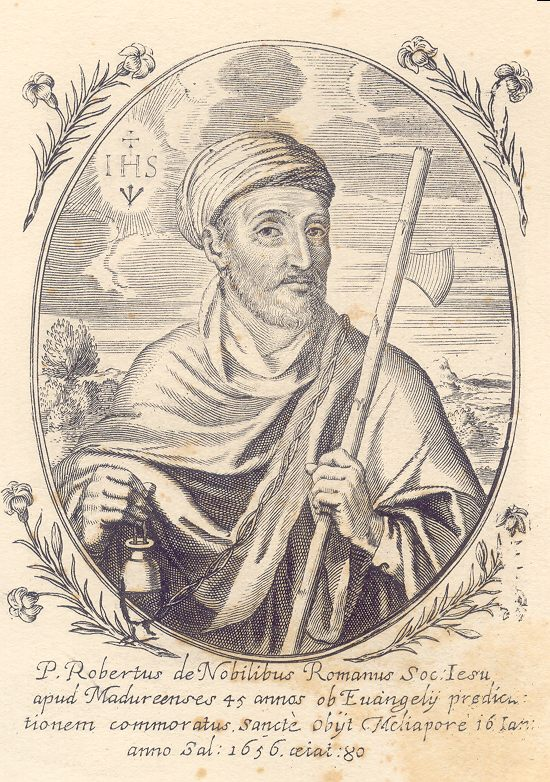
Roberto de Nobili

Roberto de Nobili arrived in Madurai in 1606, a date which is often given as the beginning of the Madurai Mission despite Fernandes’s decade long tenure, and quickly took note of the situation. He realised that it was due to the perception of Christianity as a religion of the lower castes and Frangui that made conversion inconceivable for the Brahmins. De Nobili thus put into practise the idea of accommodatio; he rejected his similarities with Fernandez and stated that he was both a ‘Roman raja’ (i.e. a noble) and a sannyāsi and attempted to present Christianity as something not inextricably bound to the lower castes. His attempts to live correctly according to Brahmin lifestyle immediately began to bear fruit and he was given some land by Erumeikatti, a local chieftain. In 1608 de Nobili was already facing hostility from the Brahmin community who opposed his preaching a lower caste religion which subsequently lead to de Nobili’s cooks abandoning him, as they did not want to lose standing by serving de Nobili. This was problematic, as the correct diet was an essential part of being a Brahmin. Luckily for de Nobili, however, in 1608 he also met Śivadharma, a Brahmin from Madurai who must’ve thought highly of de Nobili as he would be referred to by the latter as his maestro. Not only did Śivadharma prepare de Nobili’s food, he also began to instruct him on the Vedic texts and even translated them, a crime punishable by death. Furthermore, he also assisted de Nobili in defending against the accusation that the latter was a Frangui; thus impure and therefore restricted from preaching. In 1609 de Nobili was joined Manuel Leitão, another Portuguese Jesuit. The latter’s arrival was seen as useful by de Nobili because the former’s darker skin would allow him to integrate himself more into Madurai society. Śivadharma himself converted to Christianity and was baptised as ‘Bonifacio Xastri’, although he would refer to himself by his birthname for the rest of his life.

One issue, which would continuously hamper the mission throughout its entire existence was both its financial upkeep and the view on the part of the local Indians that the mission itself was wealthy. Technically, the mission was to be supported by the Portuguese policy of Padroado, which gave the Portuguese crown administrative authority over overseas missions in exchange for their upkeep. However, the Portuguese crown was lax in its payments and Antonio Vico, another Jesuit missionary, paid for much of the mission’s expenses out of his own pocket. An issue which was further exacerbated by increasing Dutch attacks on the Portuguese Empire in Asia, particularly the later seizure of Cochin in 1662. Many local lords, throughout the whole existence of the old mission, demanded wealth from the Jesuits; including Erumeikatti, who arrested some Jesuits until they gave him a velvet coat.

=== The Madurai Mission controversy ===
Relations between Fernandes and de Nobili had been continuously deteriorating since the latter’s arrival in 1606. Beyond de Nobili’s living in high society and Fernandes being consigned to the lower castes, Fernandes rejected Brahmanical traditions as pagan and religious, thus condemning both their adoption and acceptance by de Nobili through his policy of accommodatio. In 1610 the tensions boiled over and Fernandes sent a letter to Alberto Laerzio who began an inquiry into de Nobili’s adoption and permitting of Brahmin customs within the Christian sphere, a process which led to three separate inquiries (1610, 1617 and 1618). Despite these inquiries, de Nobili came out on top and successfully defended his adoption and conservation of Brahmin practices in converting the Brahmin classes of Madurai.

=== Expansion ===
In 1611, the mission’s project once again came under threat as the local Brahmins again attacked Christianity as a religion of the lower castes and stated that it would denigrate any Brahmin who was a disciple of the Frangui priest which, in turn, led to the shunning of the Brahmin who followed de Nobili This deteriorating development was arrested by Śivadharma, who requested the intercession of one of the most respected Brahmins in Madurai to determine whether Christianity was indeed a low-caste religion or whether it could be practised by Brahmins. Following an affirmative response, the Christian Brahmins were readmitted into the community and their numbers grew.

Yet this growth was minute and even where conversions were made only one in three would actually remain Christian. Furthermore, despite the recognition of Christianity as a religion separate from the lower castes, the Brahmins were extremely unhappy with having to share their faith with lower castes. When some Brahmin from Madurai, including Hindu ones, heard that some Jesuit missionaries had not only converted some untouchables but also kept working with them after the fact, they burnt some churches down. By 1622 there were only 29 Brahmin converts .In 1616 the capital of the Madurai Kingdom was also moved from Madurai to Tamilagam, which caused some issues for the Jesuits as the Madurai kings had been generally sympathetic to them in local disputes but now the Jesuits would have to deal with local officials who were often uninterested in their plight.

During the 1620s, de Nobili, and thus the Jesuits, became respected throughout southern India and he was given a royal reception, being cloaked in gold, in many local courts under the Kingdom of Madurai with many giving rights to construct churches or to move freely throughout the realm. One outcome of de Nobili’s success was the segregation of the missions’ clergy itself based on the caste system, although it would only officially be confirmed by Benedict XIV in the 18th century.

This focus on sannyāsi and Brahmin began to change by the 1640s when Baltasar da Costa arrived. Unlike de Nobili, da Costa did not believe that successfully converting the Brahmin would cause everyone else to follow suit – especially since the Brahmin themselves were extremely reticent regarding conversion. Instead, da Costa, as a paṇṭāram priest aimed to shift the focus of the mission away from the Brahmin although he did not go as far as Fernandes in discounting de Nobili’s method of accommodatio.

Throughout the entire period of the old Madurai mission, the number of Jesuits present was minuscule. In 1646 there were only four Jesuits in the entire mission: Roberto de Nobili and Manuel Martins (who acted as sannyāsi and dealt with Brahmins), and Baltasar da Costa and Manuel Alvarez (who acted as paṇṭārams and dealt with lower castes). Yet once da Costa turned the focus of the mission away from the staunchly conservative Brahmin the mission began to balloon in size due to the number of converts. Catechists became vital for the mission as, unlike the European missionaries, they were truly Indian and could wholly shake off accusations that they were, in fact, Frangui. One catechist, Savery Rayan (baptised as Peter Xavier), was extremely knowledgeable on religious matters and after his conversion to Christianity he became a well known debater to such an extent that other religious scholars feared debating him; he was held in such great respect that he was sent to Sathyamangalam to handle 200 recent converts and prepare them for baptism by himself. Many indigenous religious figures who converted, such as paṇṭārams and yogis, not only brought their own flocks with them but knowledge regarding the Indian religious scene. During the 1640s around 100,000 people were allegedly converted.

Despite these sudden increases, there was still significant opposition. Although we only have fragmentary evidence, there appears to have been a well developed anti-Christian literary culture in the region from the Śaiva community, with whom the mission had always struggled with. Fragments remain of an anti-Christian tract titled Ēcumata nirākaraṇam (The refutation of the religion of Jesus), probably written during de Nobili’s life and, therefore, possibly directed at him, which shows a great understanding of Christian myths and theology. There are also various examples of apostasies, martyrdoms (such as St. João de Brito) and the burning of churches. However, the mission continued to expand significantly due to the zealous efforts of the many catechists. Joseph Houpert estimated that, in 1676, there were 50,000 converts, 9 Jesuit fathers, and 25 catechists; in 1734 10 Jesuit fathers and 100 catechists.

== French period ==
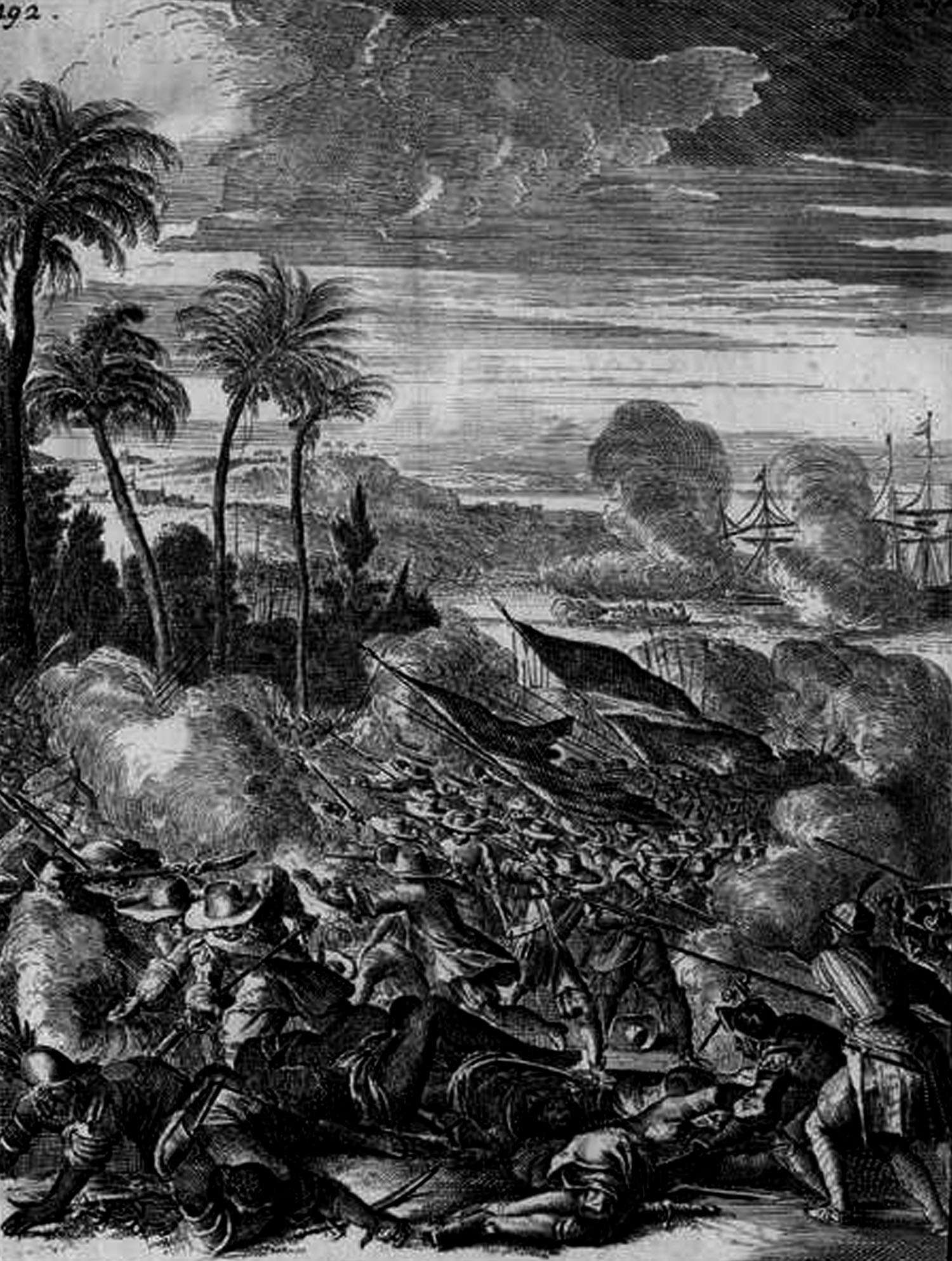
The battle between the Dutch and the Portuguese in December 1661

Following the loss of Cochin to the Dutch by the Portuguese, the issue of funding for the mission became critical as the Padroado, for all intents and purposes, ceased functioning. Already prior to this, the continued anti-Portuguese activity by the Dutch was already weakening the Portuguese grip in southern India further. In 1653, the French founded the Societé des Missions Etrangères, which intended to take over the Padroado, and incurred great opposition from the Portuguese – although nothing came of said opposition. Although the first French Jesuits would only arrive in 1689, the weakening of the Portuguese also weakened the Jesuits’ position as a valuable mediator with the Portuguese Empire in India after they were previously needed as a counterbalance to Dutch influence.

The French Jesuits who would gradually replace the Portuguese began to actively work to bind the mission to the French, rather than the Portuguese, crown. From 1702-1776, the French Jesuits published the Lettres édifiantes et curieuses wherein the Madurai mission documents were placed alongside the French Carnatic mission based out of Pondicherry and wherein the Jesuits began actively promoting the mission as a French one. Jean Venant Bouchet, a French Jesuit who left for India in 1688, organised the construction of a church in Ahur, the first such church to not be deliberately hidden but instead visible to all.

Missionary activity continued, however, as did the heavy reliance placed upon the catechists, who remained central to the mission’s efforts. Despite continued financial support from France, the Jesuits still struggled to pay their catechists well and there were complaints that Protestant catechists were paid significantly more than their Catholic counterparts. This, alongside the continued social problems caused by catechists being branded traitors by fellow Indians and the catechists’ continuously suffering in the place of their Jesuit fathers, began to cause further mistrust and disquiet between the Jesuit fathers and catechists; for example, Bouchet’s catechists were tortured to make him reveal his supposed treasures. These aggravations were furthered by further restrictions being placed on Indian social customs in 1703 by Cardinal de Tournon (which was subsequently confirmed by Pope Clement XI in 1734). This led to a public break between three of Bouchet’s catechists and himself, where the former begged the Madurai Nayak to expel Bouchet from the realm. Although they failed, due to Bouchet’s competent politicking and gift-giving in the Nayak’s court, the issue of apostasy would remain a threat to the mission’s goals. Furthermore, following the issuing of the Omnium Sollicitudinum in 1740, a Papal Bull condemning the Malabar Rites, the reliance on catechists (and thus any chance of actually converting the Indian population on any notable scale) declined.

=== Effects on Tamil literature ===
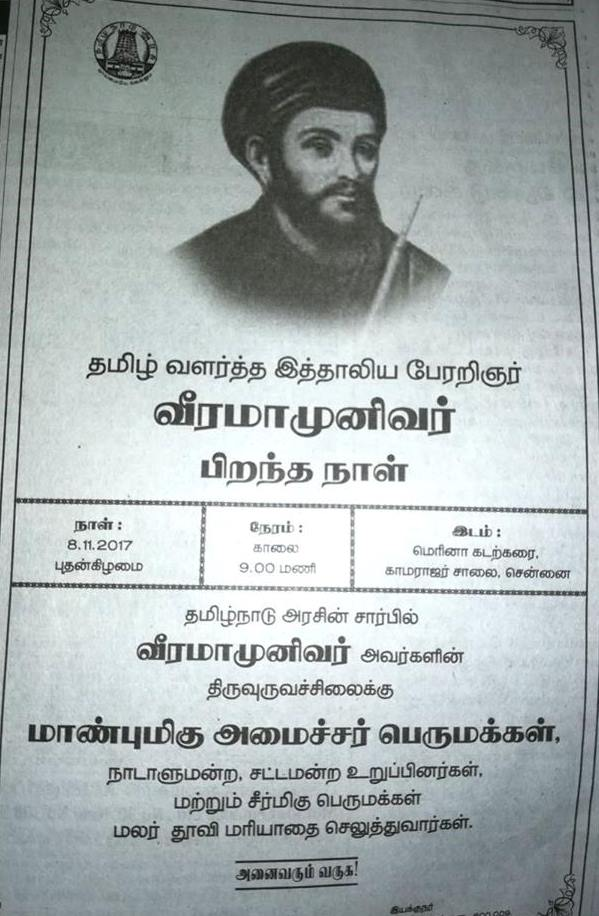
TamilNadu government's paper advertisement paying homage to Veeramamunivar

Another important development was the maturing of Christian Tamil literature in the region. Although the first Christian Tamil works had already been written prior to the Madurai mission’s existence, these were mere translations of Abrahamic works. Constantine Beschi, an Italian Jesuit who also became personal friends with the last Madurai Nayak, Chanda Sahib, began to write a corpus of Tamil-language texts which, although clearly Christian in nature, were decidedly rooted in the Tamil literary tradition. The most important of them was the Tēmpāvaṇi (A Garland of Unfading Honey-Sweet Verses), a great work of poetry about the life of St. Joseph. This work, thanks to its inclusion of many Christian myths and their integration into Tamil genre and context, became essential to the edification of the catechists who would learn from it during spiritual retreats, before using it as the basis of their sermons and spiritual work. This, in turn, led to an explosion of indigenous Catholic literature, such as the Marikarutammāḷ Ammāṉai (a ballad about St. Margaret which was possibly written by a Muslim convert).

The good relationship between the Jesuits and the Nayaks of Madurai generally kept the Jesuits far safer throughout the South of India, although there are notable exceptions such as the Maravar Rengunathasethupati, who was responsible for de Brito’s martyrdom, and the Maratha king Shahuji I, who arrested 10,000 Christians and 2 Jesuit fathers.

== End and succeeding missions ==
The expulsion of the Jesuit Order from Portuguese territory in the year 1759 put an immediate check on the supply of missionaries, but the fathers already in the mission, being outside the Portuguese dominions, were able to continue their work though with diminishing numbers. The entire suppression of the Order in 1773, however, brought the Jesuit regime to an end. Three years later (1776) a new mission of the Carnatic was established by the Holy See, under the Paris Seminary for Foreign Missions, which, taking Pondicherry as its center, gradually extended its labors inwards as far as Mysore, and to the old Madura Mission. Under the Foreign Mission Society the remaining Jesuit Fathers continued to work till they gradually died out. Not much in the way of missionary work was done by the Goan clergy, who took the place of the Jesuits in certain stations, and the results previously gained were in prospect of being almost totally lost.

In the year 1836 the Karnatic mission was erected into the Vicariate Apostolic of the Coromandel Coast; and as the, Foreign Mission Society could not for want of men come to the rescue of Madura, they willingly accepted the appointment of the Jesuits in the same year - the Society having been restored in 1814. In 1846 the Madura Mission was in turn made into a vicariate Apostolic with Jesuit Msgr. Alexis Canoz as its first vicar Apostolic; but the portion north of the Cauvery was retained by Pondicherry. In 1886, on the establishment of the hierarchy, the Madura Vicariate was made the Diocese of Trichy. In 1893 Tanjore was taken away and given to the Padroado Diocese of Mylapore. In the same year the Trichy Diocese was finally made suffragan to Bombay.

== Sources ==
- Agmon, Danna, 'Conflicts in the Context of Conversion: French Jesuits and Tamil Religious Intermediaries in Madurai, India', Intercultural Encounter and the Jesuit Mission in South Asia: (16th-18th Centuries), ed. by Anand Amaldass and Ines Županov, (Bangalore: Asian Trading Corporation, 2014), pp. 179-198.
- Chakravarti, Ananya, 'The many faces of Baltasar da Costa: imitatio and accommodatio in the seventeenth century Madurai mission', Etnográfica, 18 (2014), pp. 135-158.
- Hull, Ernest, ‘Madura Mission’, in The Catholic Encyclopedia, ed. by Charles Herberman and others, 15 vols (New York: Encyclopedia Press Inc., 1907) IX.
- Karttunen, Klaus, COSTA, Baltasar da, <https://whowaswho-indology.info/1369/costa-baltasar-da-2/> [accessed 6 June 2023].
- Karttunen, Klaus, FERNANDEZ, Gonçalo, <https://whowaswho-indology.info/14172/fernandez-goncalo/> [accessed 22 May 2023].
- Rocher, Ludo, ‘Father Bouchet’s Letter on the Administration of Hindu Law’, in Studies in Hindu Law and Dharmasastra, (London: Anthem Press, 2014), pp. 673-698.
- Strickland, William, The Jesuit in India: Addressed to all who are Interested in the Foreign Missions, (London: Burns & Lambert, 1852).
- Sundararaj, T., 'The Relation Between Jesuit Missionaries and the Native Powers in Tamil Nadu: (1595-1773)', Jesuit Presence in Indian History, ed. by Anand Amaldass, (Anand: Gujarat Sahitya Prakash, 1988), pp. 117-127.
- Trento, Margherita, ‘Śivadharma or Bonifacio? Behind the Scenes of the Madurai Mission Controversy (1608–1619)’, in The Rites Controversies in the Early Modern World, ed. by Ines Županov and Pierre Fabre, (Leiden: Brill,2018) pp. 91-121.
- Trento, Margherita, Writing Tamil Catholicism, (Leiden: Koninklijke Brill, 2022).
- Županov, Ines, The Historiography of the Jesuit Missions in India (1500-1800), <https://referenceworks.brillonline.com/entries/jesuit-historiography-online/the-historiography-of-the-jesuit-missions-in-india-15001800-COM_192579#notesup23> [accessed 6 June 2023].
- Županov, Ines, Missionary Tropics: The Catholic Frontier in India (16th-17th Centuries), (Ann Arbor: University of Michigan Press, 2005).
- Society of Jesus, Madura Mission – A History, <https://www.mdusj.org/index.php/who-we-are/our-history> [accessed 22 May 2023].
- Society of Jesus, ‘The Jesuit Madura Mission’, Woodstock Letters, 1.44 (1915), pp. 30-35.
