= Kalakrithi =

Kalakrithi is an annual inter college cultural festival organised by the students of Alagappa College of Technology, Anna University, Chennai. The event was started in 1983 to initially engage student art in the city of Madras and from 1984 onwards attracted artists from around the state of Tamil Nadu. It usually takes place in February and is a three-day celebration of art, music and life. The highlight is the philanthropic motto students carry every year initiated in kalakrithi'13 with organ donation awareness where young students signed in to donate their organs was highly appreciated by well-known politicians and activists.

== Students Association and Arts Society ==
Kalakrithi is organised by the Students Association and Arts Society of the Alagappa College of Technology. It is a student-run organisation committed towards nurturing and portraying various forms of art, with officers elected annually by the students.

== Events and activities ==
The event takes place over three days and nights. The main events are the concert, variety show and the choreo-night which are held in the evenings of the three days. Since its inception, Kalakrithi has hosted an array of celebrities, adding to the festive flavour and fanfare of the event. The events have included:

- Literary activities like essay writing, debate, jam, ad-zap and extemporaneous speeches
- Dramatical activities like video dubbing and variety shows
- Group and solo singing events
- Group and solo dance
- Concerts
- Quizzes
- Treasure hunts
- Gaming
- Workshops in direction, dance, photography, and pottery
- Interactive sessions with noted people of the film industry

== Celebrities ==
Actors including Eeram Aadhi, Nani, Sarathkumar, Vijay sethupathi, Simha Bobby, Varalakshmi sarathkumar, Vani Kapoor, Kazhugu Krishna and comedians have marked their votes for this cultural extravaganza was an honor for music and arts society. Concerts and Lec-Dem by notable singers and musicians like Vidwan S Balachandar (Veena), Karthik, Aalap Raju, Naresh Iyer, Krish, Stephen Devassy, Sivamani and singers from Airtel Super Singer have appeared at the event. The event has also hosted various directors like Ghilli Dharani, Gautham Vasudev Menon, Vetri Maaran, Vishnuvardhan and also various Tamil actors.

== Reception ==
The event has seen wide positive reviews from college students of Chennai and rest of the country.
