= Alexis Canoz =

French Jesuit missionary and bishop in India (1805–1888)

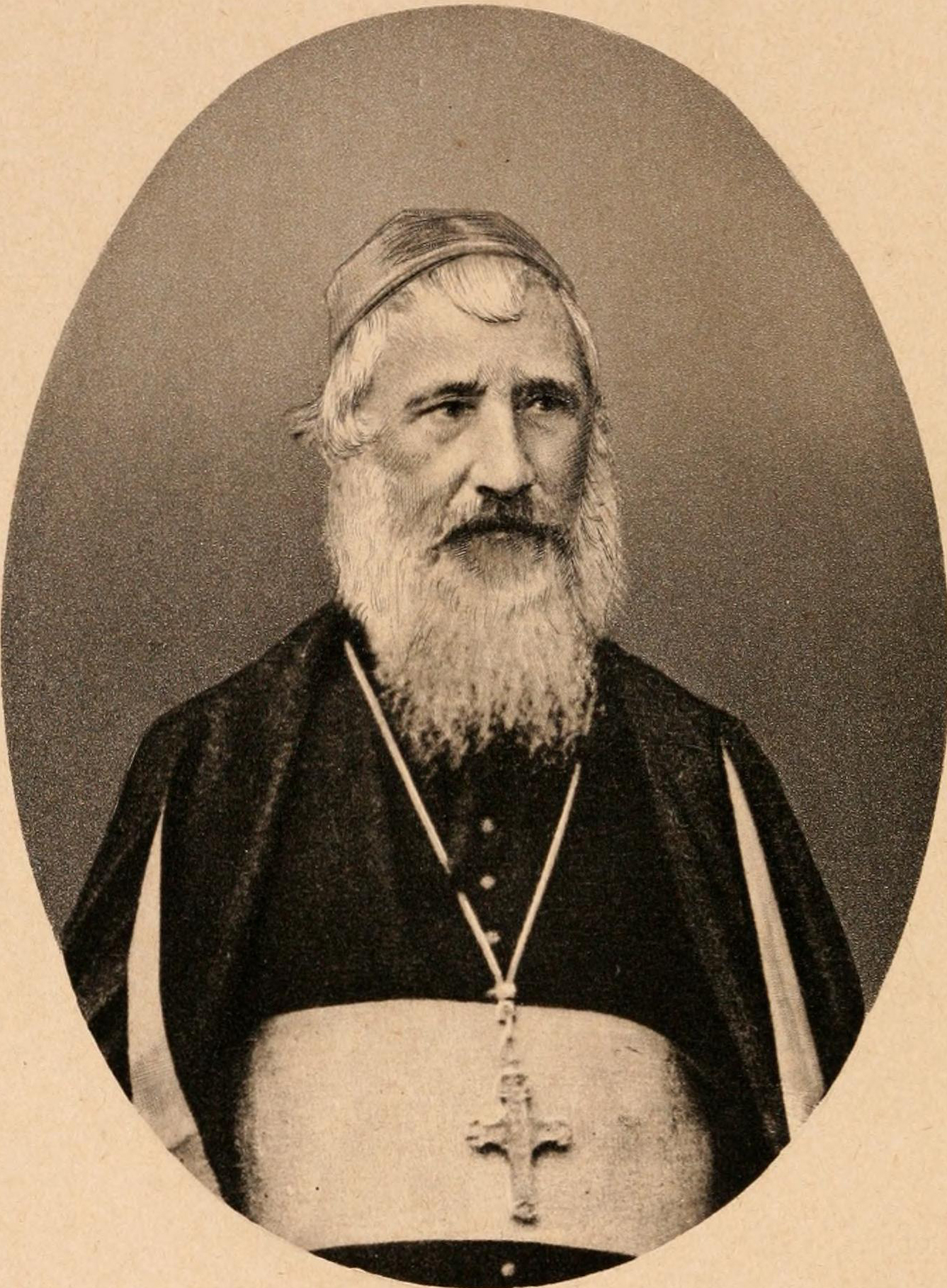
Alexis Canoz, first bishop of Trichy

Alexis Canoz (8 September 1805 – 2 December 1888) was a Jesuit missionary in India and was the first bishop of Trichy. He was born on 8 September 1805 at Sellières, France. In 1846 the Madura Mission was made into a vicariate Apostolic with Canoz as its first vicar Apostolic. He was ordained a bishop on 29 Jun 1847 by Archbishop Louis (de Sainte Thérèse) Martini, with Bishop Clément Bonnand and Bishop Marion-Brésillac acting as principal co-consecrators. In 1886, on the establishment of the catholic hierarchy in India, the Madura Vicariate was made the Diocese of Trichy with Canoz becoming its first bishop. He participated in the first Vatican council as a church father.
