= Down Sterling =

Down Sterling was the name of the Loyola College, Chennai,'s annual cultural festival. It was held in the early 1980s, and again between 1985 and 1992, before being cancelled for various reasons. The college cultural fest was named after the college's well-known rock band - Down Sterling.

The Hindu reported about this event:

"There was a famous inter-collegiate cultural festival, held annually in Loyola College, which had been named after Sterling Road — Down Sterling. Today the cultural fest is no more than a memory. It was scrapped more than a decade ago as it turned into a hot bed of inter-collegiate violence." Year after Year Students Union of the college tries to bring back the prestigious event but are not given a go from the management. It's been 20 years since it's been sacked.

—

== Down Sterling College Band ==
The original college band lineup (1980s) consisted of:

- Shrikanth Barathan - (Statistics) Vocals
- Grenville Jones - (Statistics) Vocals
- Sudhin Prabhakar - (Zoology) Lead guitar
- Calistus D’Costa - (B.Com.) Keyboards
- Fabian Holt - (B.Com.) Bass guitar
- Noel Peters - (B.Com.) Drums

== Name Change ==
As of 2010 the name of the cultural event in Loyola is Ovations which is India's Biggest Intra-Collegiate event and is held at a whopping expense.
