= Double Glazing & Conservatory Ombudsman Scheme =

Regulatory body in the United Kingdom

The Double Glazing & Conservatory Ombudsman Scheme (DGCOS) is an independent UK regulatory body for the UK’s double glazing and conservatory industry. Its agenda includes vetting of suppliers, guaranteeing customer access to industry inspectors, and protecting members against unfounded complaints. It was established in 2010.

== Background ==
The double glazing and conservatory industry in the UK is large, with 14,000 window, door and conservatory companies operating.

An investigation by consumer magazine Which? indicated that the UK's double glazing industry had a lack of transparency regarding prices, acknowledging the importance of the industry ensuring that all traders were reputable.

=== Vetting standards ===
DGCOS ensures all member businesses have gone through a 12-point vetting process which includes:

- submitting references of 10 jobs completed in the past 12 months
- submitting 3 supplier references
- ensuring professional contracts, terms & conditions and written guarantees are in place
- that they offer insurance backed guarantees for at least 10 years
- ensure the installer has a professional complaints process with nominated complaints handler
- that they are fully covered with public liability insurance

DGCOS is an independent organisation paid for by installers and does not charge consumers.

=== Benefits ===
==== Consumers ====
- a free quote for a DGCOS member
- an information pack which explains the protections offered by the scheme
- Free Comprehensive written guarantee
- Free Deposit Protection
- Free Insurance-Backed Guarantee (to underwrite the guarantee if the installer ceases to trade)
- Free access to industry inspectors, mediators and an ombudsman (where all decisions are legally binding & enforceable)

==== Traders ====
- Protection to its members' businesses in situations where customers withhold payments or make unfounded complaints, allowing them to claim for unpaid contracts in cases where the Ombudsman has found in favour of the installer and the customer refuses to pay
- Installers are given marketing and point of sale materials to assist them gaining new clients.
- Back office management systems to automatically produce guarantees / comply with building control regulations
- Ongoing performance analysis to enable installers to monitor their performance in 8 key areas.

== The Consumer Protection Report ==
DGCOS has published several editions of its Consumer Protection Report, most recently in 2013, which covers the state of consumer protection for customers of window and conservatory companies.
