= Loyola College, Chennai =

College in India

Coordinates: 13°03′43″N 80°14′02″E

Loyola College
- Coat of arms of Loyola College, Chennai
- Motto: Luceat Lux Vestra (Latin)
- Motto in English: Let your Light Shine
- Type: Aided Autonomous Roman Catholic Non-profit Coeducational Higher education institution
- Established: July 1925; 101 years ago
- Founder: Francis Bertram
- Religious affiliation: Roman Catholic (Jesuit)
- Academic affiliations: University of Madras
- Rector: Antony Robinson, SJ
- Principal: A. Louis Arockiaraj SJ
- Faculty: 364
- Administrative staff: 201
- Students: 10,381
- Location: Sterling Road, Nungambakkam, Chennai, Tamil Nadu, India
- Campus: Urban 99 acres (400,000 m^{2})
- Colors: Yellow Blue
- Nickname: Loyolite
- Website: loyolacollege.edu

Loyola College is a government aided private Catholic higher education institution run by the Society of Jesus in Chennai, Tamil Nadu, India. It was founded in 1925 by the French Jesuit priest, Francis Bertram, along with other European Jesuits. It is an autonomous Jesuit college affiliated with the University of Madras. Loyola College has more than 10,000 students studying as of 2023.

== History ==
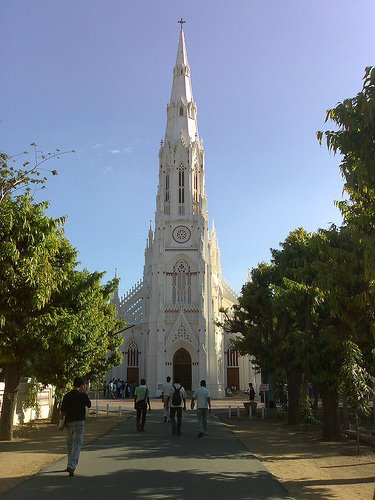
Loyola Church

The name Loyola comes from the ancestral castle where Íñigo López de Loyola was born in 1491, the last of a large Basque family. He along with St. Francis Xavier and five other companions founded the Society of Jesus (the Jesuit Order), a worldwide organization of religious men numbering about 19,000. Nearly 4,000 are working in the 18 provinces of India as of 2017.

In Tamil Nadu, there are 480 Jesuits working in schools, colleges, youth services, social work centres, parishes, mission outreach programmes, and in other forms of service and church ministry.

Loyola College was founded in 1925 by the French Jesuit priest, Francis Bertram (originally a.k.a. Père François Bertrand; 1870/1871–1936), along with other European Jesuits, Fr. Francis Bertram was educated at the universities of Oxford, Cambridge, and the London School of Economics. The Department of Economics was founded by Rev Fr Basenach from the London School of Economics.

== Academics ==
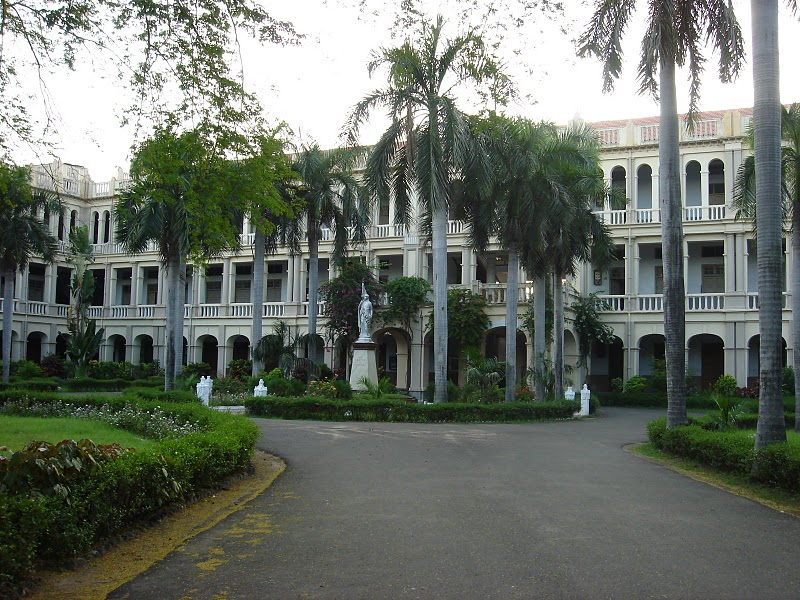
Main building

The college offers courses at the undergraduate and postgraduate levels. The arts/humanities stream includes English, economics, commerce, history, Tamil and sociology. Science courses include physics, chemistry, statistics, botany, zoology and computer science. The college follows a credit-based, semester pattern. Undergraduate students must pass all examinations and obtain at least 120 credits in three years to be eligible for a degree. All students must also earn non-academic credits from extra-curricular and social service options. The Department of Outreach facilitates social work in the college. It is a degree requirement that every student irrespective of department complete the outreach program in second year, intended to form more complete human persons. The program takes students to slums and backward areas in and around Chennai to acquaint them with the sufferings of the people and to serve in small ways to better the living conditions. The program awards 3 credits.

Loyola College along with Women's Christian college are the only colleges in the state capital Chennai with "A+" accreditation from NAAC. India Today magazine in 2005, 2006, 2007, 2008, and 2009 ranked Loyola number one in India for science degrees, and in 2007 in both science and humanities. The Department of Scientific and Industrial Research has recognised Loyola College as a Scientific and Industrial Research Organisation, the highest research honour for an Arts and Science College.

The college has been conferred a "College with Potential For Excellence" status by the University Grants Commission. It was given a ₹10 million grant (1 Crore) in 2006 by the UGC for continual improvement of facilities. The UGC has further certified it as a "College of Excellence" in the year 2014. The certification, for a period of five years until 2019, comes with a grant of Rs. 2 crore for the college to upgrade its facilities.

Loyola college is one of the colleges which was selected for Deen Dayal Upadhyay KAUSHAL Kendra, a remarkable scheme initiated and funded by the Government of India and the University Grants Commission. It hosts a variety of courses like B.Voc. 3D Animation, B.Voc. Digital Journalism, M.Voc. 3D Animation and M.Voc. Digital Journalism, all of which are designed to offer Job oriented training. It has both UG and PG level curriculum courses in the department.

=== Rankings ===
College rankings

General – India
- NIRF (Colleges) (2024): 8

Loyola College secured 8th rank in The National Institutional Ranking Framework (NIRF) ranking 2024.

== Institute for Excellence ==
- Loyola College of Education
- Loyola Institute of Business Administration
- Centre for International Program
- Entomology Research Institute
- Ignatian Institute for Career Development
- Institute for Dialogues with Cultures and Religions (Research institution under University of Madras)
- Loyola – Racine Research Institute of Mathematics and Computer Sciences
- Loyola ICAM College of Engineering and Technology
- Loyola Institute for Industrial and Social Science Research
- Loyola Institute of Frontier Energy
- Loyola Institute of People Studies
- Loyola Institute of Social Science Training and Research
- Loyola Institute of Personal Development
- Loyola Institute of Vocational Education

== Culturals ==
Loyola College was a pioneer among colleges in South India in hosting cultural fests, and stands out among men's college in Chennai for fostering well-rounded development. Women were first admitted at the turn of the millennium, and they too are encouraged to participate in cultural activities. The college has been commended for its blend of cultures and for requiring all students to have weekly contact with the poor. Its cultural sensitivity also extends worldwide.

The large, Down Sterling inter-college carnival was terminated by college authorities in 1992 when things got out of hand. This historic carnival is memorialized in the friendship song "MUSTHAFA MUSTHAFA" from the movie Kadhal Desam (1996).

To somewhat fill the void the Loyola Student's Union organizes the intra-collegiate cultural event Ovations each September where the students compete for the Trophy in both on and off stage cultural competitions while representing their home departments. The college also used to host an annual inter-collegiate dance competition called "Ignite" each February, where its dance team, Loyola Dream Team, excels; also featured are Western/acoustic music bands, and variety and mime teams, but has not been conducted for the past 3 years for various reasons.

== Alumni ==
Loyola college alumni also referred to as Loyolites have been contributors in various fields of law, politics, civil services, science, education, business, sports and entertainment.

Loyola Alumni Association was officially started during the time of Rev.Fr.Lawrence Sundaram SJ in 1990. At present there are 34,000+ members. Loyola Alumni Day is celebrated on the First Sunday of August every year which is "Friendship Day".

Notable Loyala College alumni include:

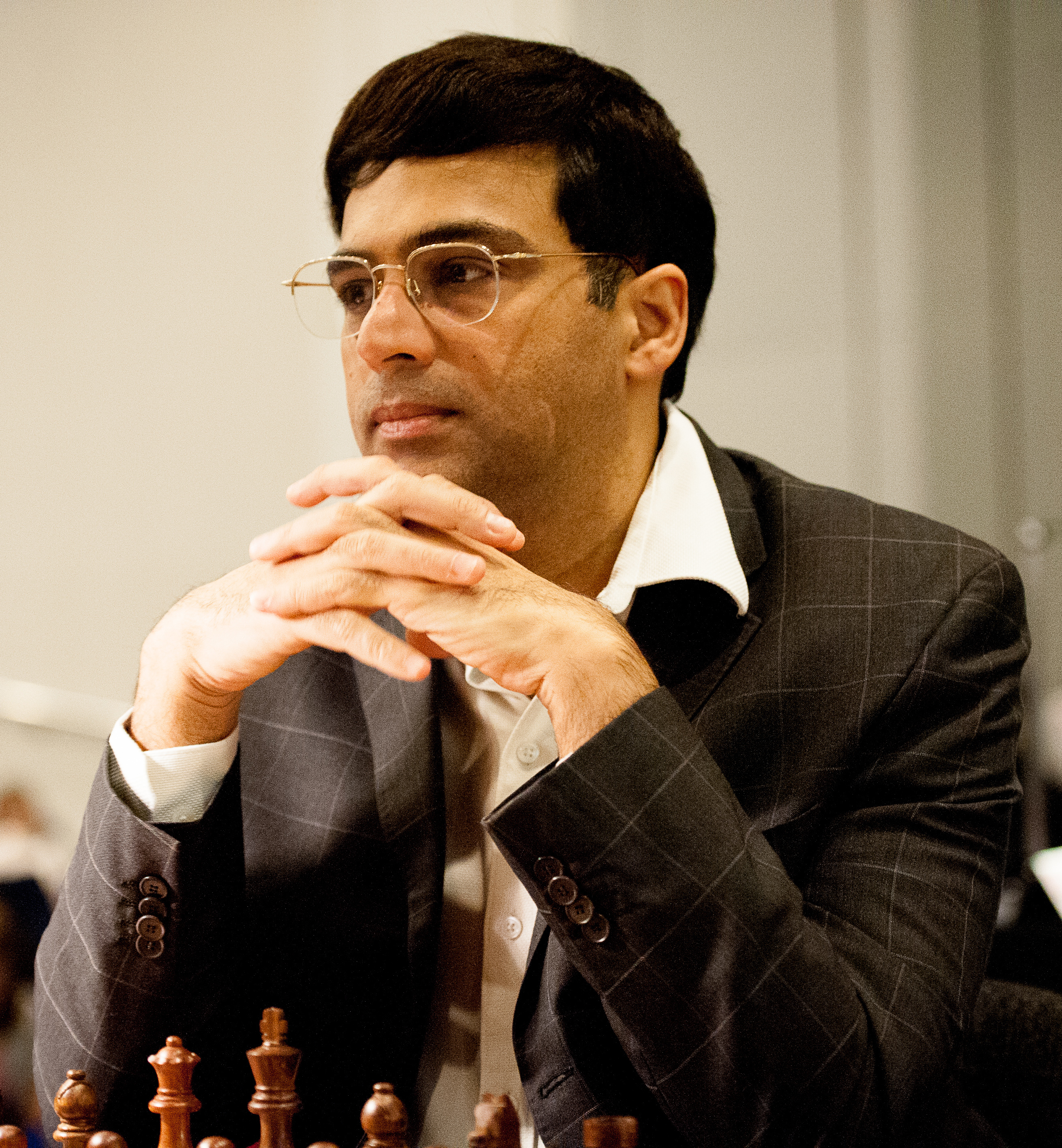
Viswanathan Anand, Five time World Chess Champion and winner of multiple International Chess tournaments

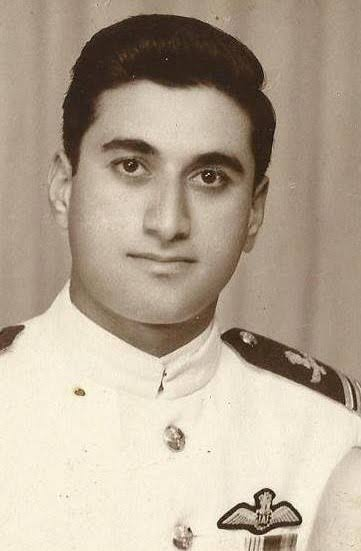
Dara Phiroze Chinoy, Retired Indian Air Force Group Captain.

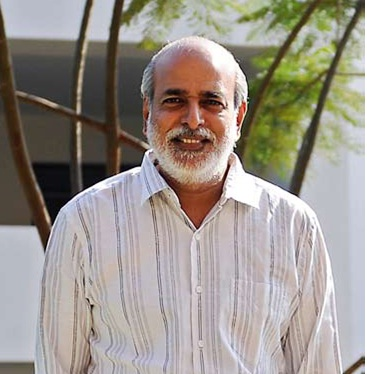
Sashi Kumar, Founder and promoter of Asianet, chairman of the Asian College of Journalism, Chennai

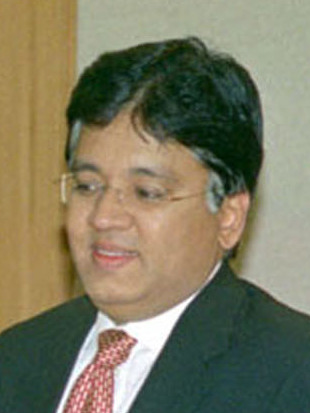
Kalanithi Maran, Founder and chairman of the SUN Group

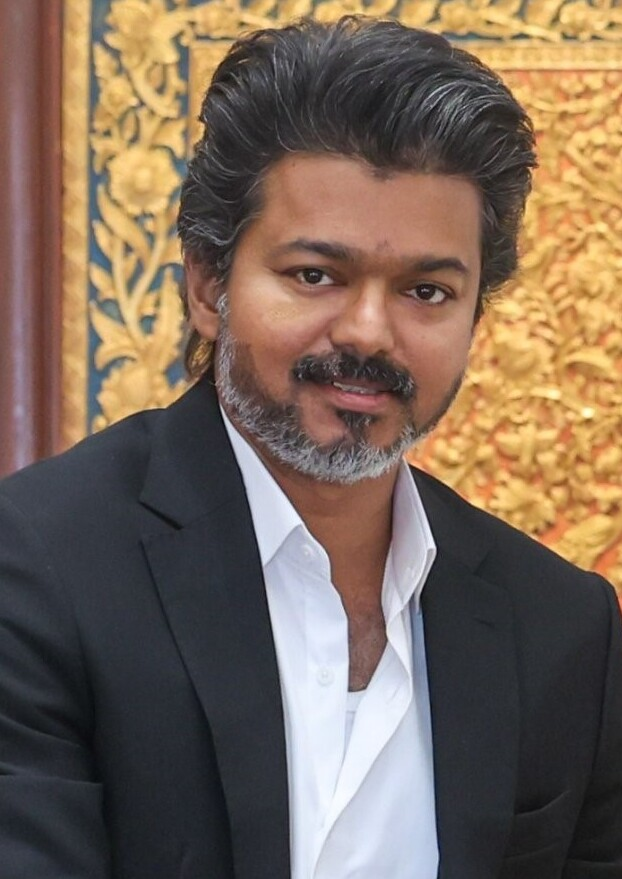
C. Joseph Vijay, current Chief Minister of Tamil Nadu

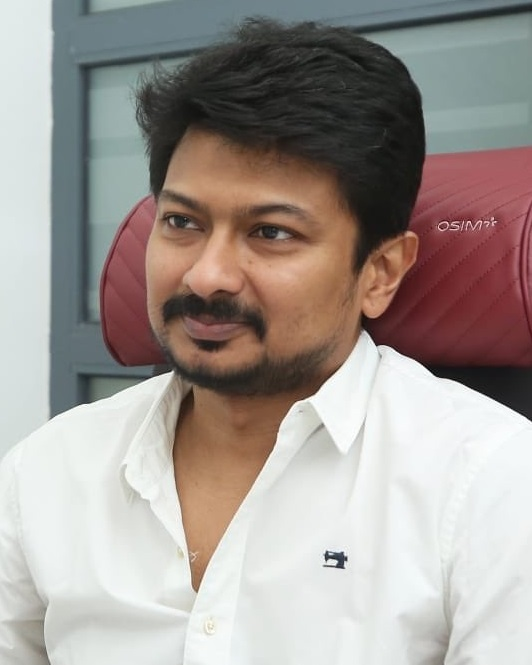
Udhayanidhi Stalin, Former Deputy chief minister of Tamil Nadu and current leader of opposition in TN Assembly

== Gallery ==
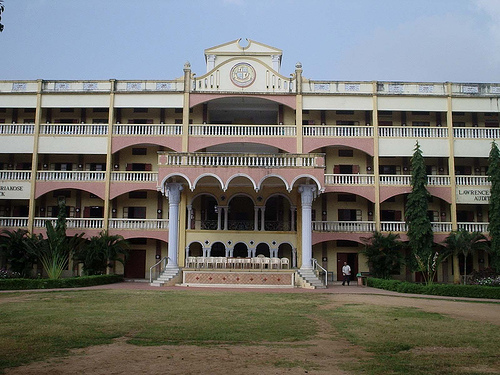
The Jubilee Building

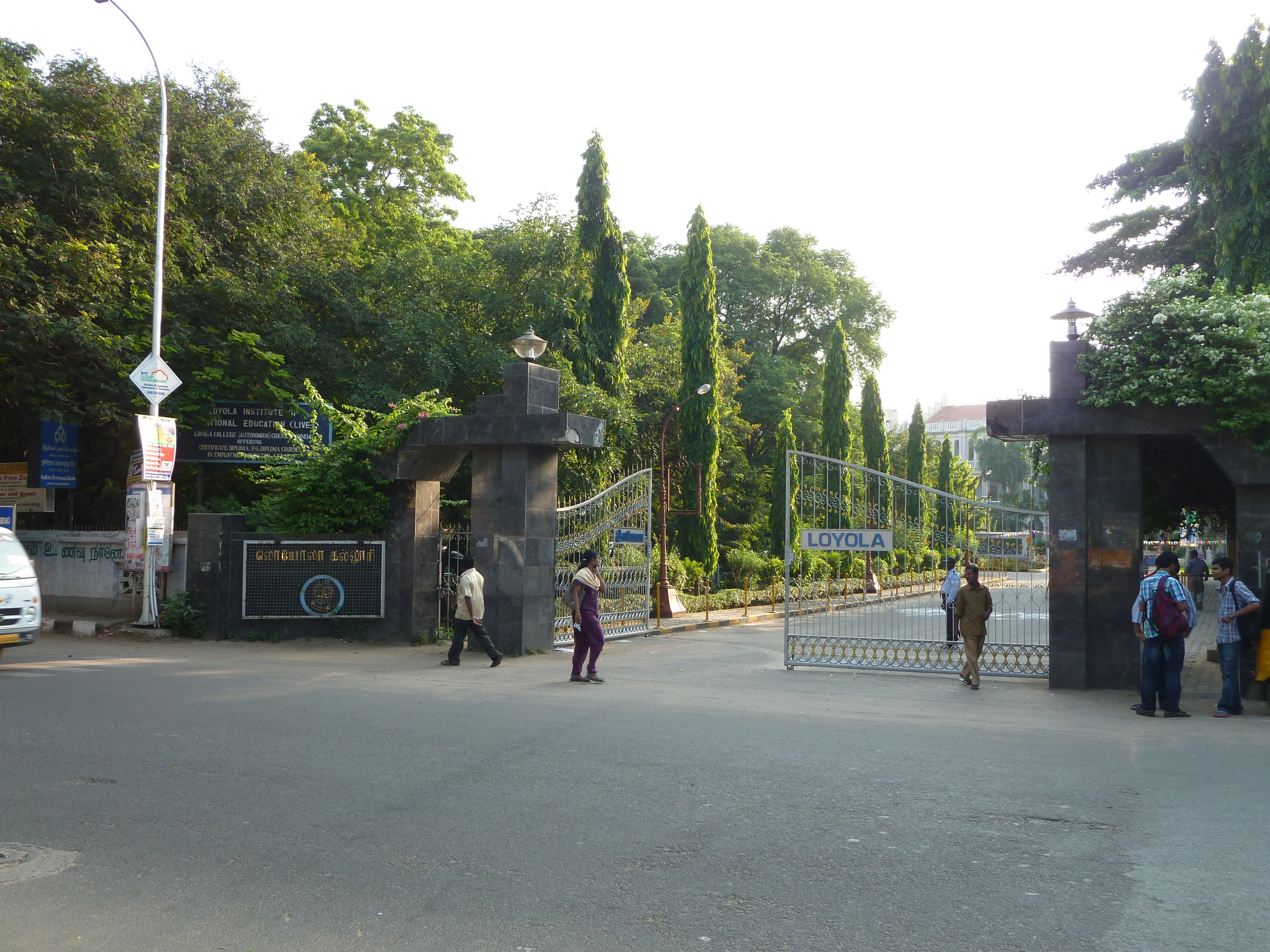
Entrance gate

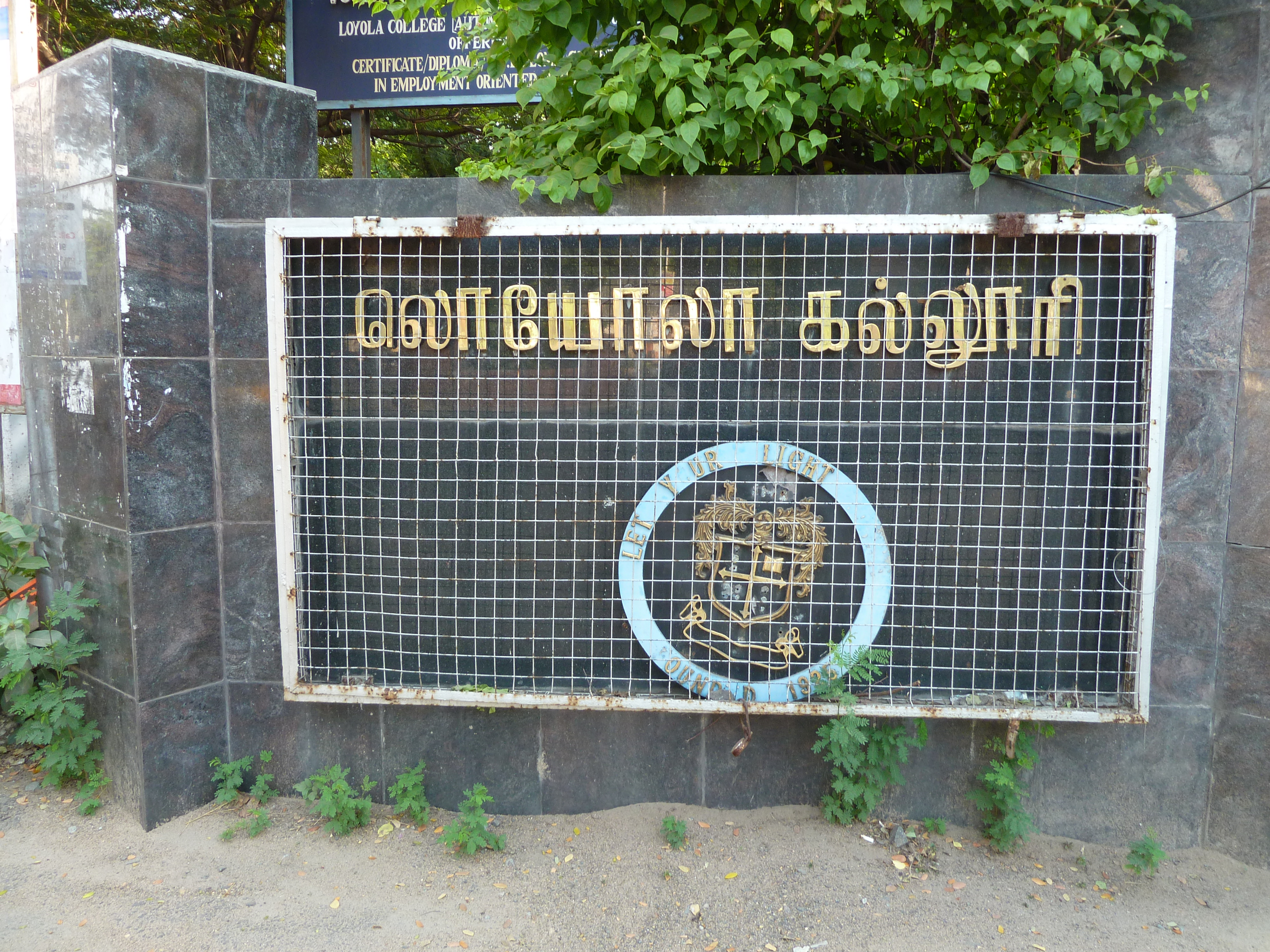
Name board at the entrance in Tamil

== See also ==
- Loyola Institute Business Administration
- Loyola-ICAM College of Engineering and Technology
- Loyola College of Education
- List of Jesuit sites
