= The LBG =

Rock band from Chennai, India

Little Babooshka's Grind
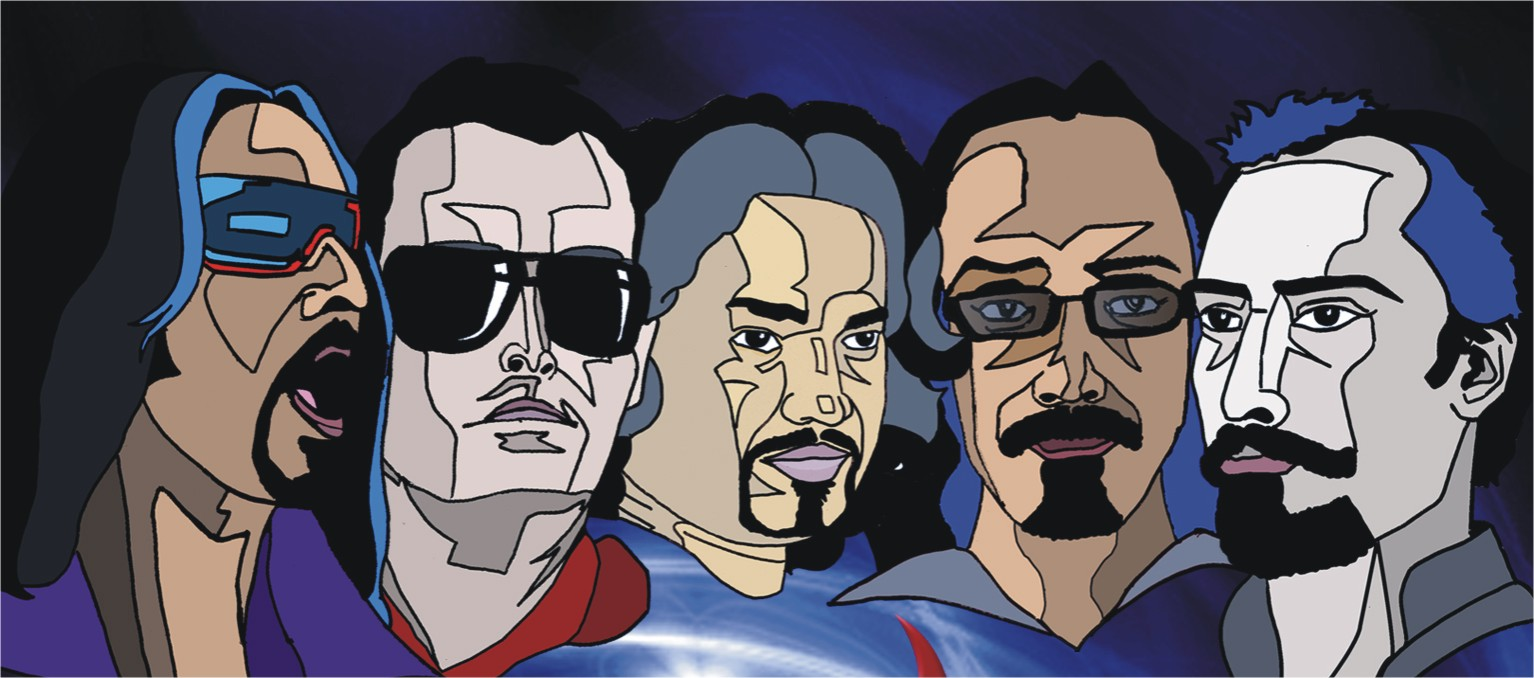
- Pioneers of Original rock in India since 1996

Background information
- Also known as: LBG
- Origin: Chennai, Tamil Nadu, India.
- Genre: Rock Indian Rock World Music
- Years active: 1996–present
- Label: MMU
- Members: Arjun Janakiram; Aum Janakiram; Avnith Janakiram; Maynard Grant; Praveen Heinrich
- Past members: Reginald Goveas; R8; Joy; Regi; Vasanth; Sanjay; Rajini; Arjun Thomas; Rehan Khan; Sunder; Vinayak
- Website: http://www.thelbg.com/

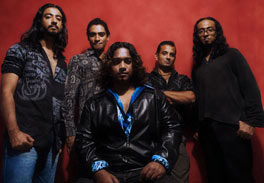
LBG Current Members

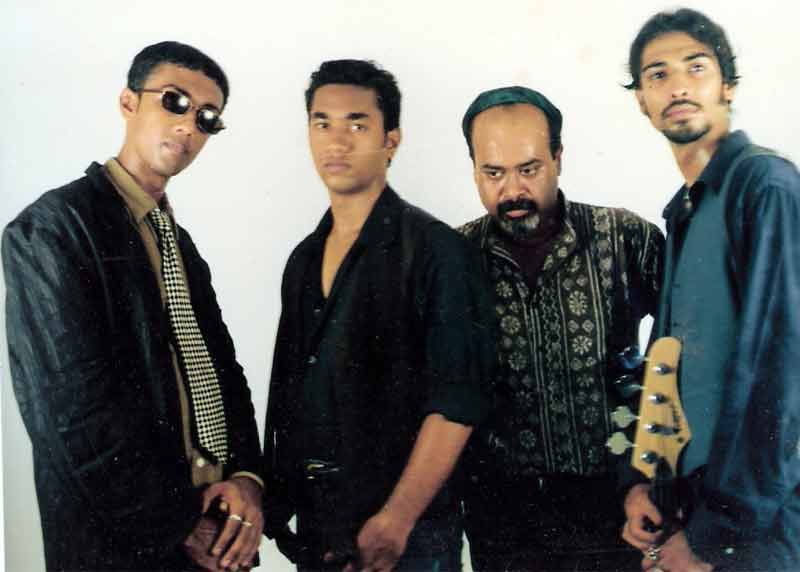
LBG Old Members

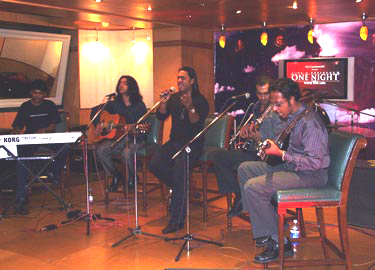
LBG At Match Point

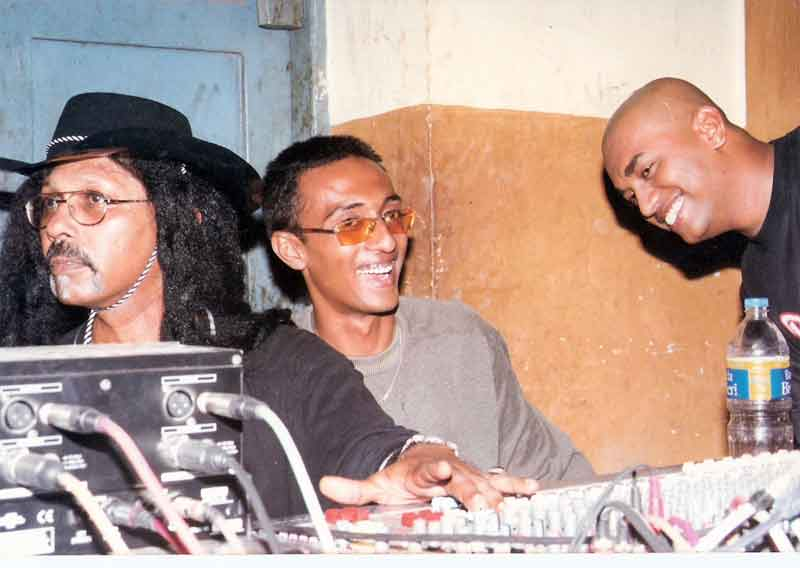
Dheena Mixing, with Avnith and Praveen (circa 2004)

LBG is a rock group from Chennai, India. It was formerly known as Little Babooshka's Grind. They are noted in the Indian rock music scene for performing only originals and no covers.

== History ==
LBG has existed since 1996 and started out playing the national college cultural circuit. In 1999, they decided that they had had enough of playing other people's music, so they set out to become one of the pioneers of performing original music in India.

They released their first album, This Animal is called the Wallet in 2004

== Albums ==
LBG released its second album Bad Children on 18 November 2006 with a special launch performance at Distil, Taj Connemara. The 11 song full-length album (short listed from over 25 songs) was the culmination of more than two years of song writing, dedication and hard work. The album was recorded over a three-month period, with the band taking time to reflect over the material and making the appropriate adjustments to bring their vision of a quintessential Indian rock album to reality.

They have performed in Unwind Center's 2004, 2005 and 2011 editions of JRO (June Rock Out) where they released their full-length album on 10 July 2004 and MCC's Octavia Showdown in September 2017.
