= 2018 Swazi general election =

- 18 August-21 September 2018
- All 59 elected seats in the House of Assembly
Party	Seats	+/–
Independents	59	+4
This lists parties that won seats. See the complete results below.
Prime Minister before	Prime Minister after
Barnabas Sibusiso Dlamini	Ambrose Mandvulo Dlamini

General elections were held in Eswatini on 18 August and 21 September 2018.

== Electoral system ==
The House of Assembly consists of 59 elected seats and up to ten chosen by the Ngwenyama. The 59 elected members are elected in a two-round system. A primary election is held in each of the 385 chiefdoms to choose a candidate for the secondary election, with between three and twenty candidates in each chiefdom. In the secondary election, the country is divided into 59 constituencies (increased from 55 in the 2013 elections); each winner of the primary election then stands in the constituency that covers their chiefdom. Both rounds operate on a first-past-the-post basis, with all candidates running as independents.

== Nominations ==
Prior to the general election, candidates are nominated at the tinkhundla level. Each of the 55 tinkhundla nominates between three and twenty candidates, who must have the backing of ten members of the community. A total of 6,204 people were nominated; 4,717 male and 1,487 female. 26% of candidates were below the age of 36, 63% were between 36 and 60, and 11% were over 60.

== Primary election ==
The primary round took place on 24 August 2018, with 156,973 Swazis casting a vote out of a total of 544,310 registered voters, resulting in a 28.83% turnout. These numbers, which suggested a low confidence in the electoral process in the country, were later removed from the Electoral Commission website. They were briefly online as an annexure to a report released in November 2020.

== Secondary election ==
The electoral commission revealed the name of the 59 winners of the secondary election, yet without divulging any numbers of votes being cast for the candidates or in total. In 2013, these results had never been made public. Following the election, King Mswati appointed six members of the royal family to the House of Assembly and eight to the Senate. The results were revealed in the National Elections Report 2018.

== Results ==
The results of the secondary election were revealed in the National Elections Report 2018.

Graph of the party split among 65 seats.
Party	Votes	%	Seats	+/–
Independents	330,206	100.00	59	+4
Nominated			6	-4
Total	330,206	100.00	65	0
Valid votes	330,206	99.82		
Invalid/blank votes	579	0.18		
Total votes	330,785	100.00		
Registered voters/turnout	547,426	60.43		
Source: EBC

=== Hhohho Region ===
Hhukwini election 2018
Party	Candidate	Votes	%
Independent	Nkhanyeti Ngwenya	1,910	48.1
Independent	Alec Lushaba	1,873	47.2
Independent	Annastasia Mdluli	95	2.4
Independent	Moses Dlamini	94	2.4
Turnout		3,972	

Lobamba election 2018
Party	Candidate	Votes	%
Independent	Allen Stewart	2,778	33.8
Independent	Dumsani Mnisi	1,901	23.1
Independent	Thoko Shongwe	1,859	22.6
Independent	Sandile Magongo	1,054	12.8
Independent	Bongani Dlamini	630	7.7
Turnout		8,222	

Madlangempisi election 2018
Party	Candidate	Votes	%
Independent	Sibusiso Nxumalo	3,318	38.4
Independent	Allen Vilane	2,234	25.8
Independent	Sifiso Sibandze	1,358	15.7
Independent	Thabo Magagula	1,113	12.9
Independent	Precious Nxumalo	305	3.5
Independent	Vivian Mvumbi	233	2.7
Independent	Mbuso Dlamini	84	1.0
Turnout		8,645	

Maphalaleni election 2018
Party	Candidate	Votes	%
Independent	Mabulala Maseko	2,795	63.9
Independent	Sicelo Dlamini	677	15.5
Independent	Bonginkosi Dlamini	500	11.4
Independent	Makhosazana Fakudze-Masilela	269	6.2
Independent	Lungile Zubuko	85	1.9
Independent	Mbongseni Ndzimandze	47	1.1
Turnout		4,373	

Mayiwane election 2018
Party	Candidate	Votes	%
Independent	Gcina Dlamini	3,463	63.2
Independent	Jonathan Dlamini	1,573	28.7
Independent	Donald Nyonyane	351	6.4
Independent	Ntfombisibili Tsabedze	85	1.6
Independent	Sindie Masuku	8	0.1
Turnout		5,480	

Mbabane East election 2018
Party	Candidate	Votes	%
Independent	Harries Bulunga	2,971	55.7
Independent	Sikhatsi Dlamini	1,082	20.3
Independent	Majojo Mamba	712	13.4
Independent	Poppy Khoza	565	10.6
Turnout		5,330	

Mbabane West election 2018
Party	Candidate	Votes	%
Independent	Musa Zwane	1,804	45.8
Independent	Gwebu Gideon	1,180	29.9
Independent	Osborne Tsabedze	957	24.3
Turnout		3,941	

Motshane election 2018
Party	Candidate	Votes	%
Independent	Robert Magongo	3,288	56.9
Independent	Sikhumbuzo Hlophe	1,426	24.7
Independent	Stanely Malindzisa	1,060	18.4
Turnout		5,774	

Ndzingeni election 2018
Party	Candidate	Votes	%
Independent	Lutfo Dlamini	3,044	37.6
Independent	Mbongeni Gule	2,746	33.9
Independent	Gcina Magagula	1,330	16.4
Independent	Dumisani Maphanga	622	7.7
Independent	Machawe Nkambule	188	2.3
Independent	Nomfundo Dlamini	59	0.7
Independent	Siphawayinkhosi Dludlu	51	0.6
Independent	Mndeni Magongo	40	0.5
Independent	Sipho Abednigo	21	0.3
Turnout		8,101	

Nkhaba election 2018
Party	Candidate	Votes	%
Independent	Zakhele Magongo	3,005	55.9
Independent	Hope Shiba	1,996	37.1
Independent	Gugu Mabuza	295	5.5
Independent	July Mnisi	83	1.5
Turnout		5,379	

Ntfonjeni election 2018
Party	Candidate	Votes	%
Independent	Sifiso Magagula	3,169	44.5
Independent	Sikhumbuzo Magongo	2,432	34.1
Independent	Zeblon Dlamini	638	9.0
Independent	Mambavule Magagula	427	6.0
Independent	Gwebu Dlamini	178	2.5
Independent	Samuel Ndzabukelwako	176	2.5
Independent	Dudu Dlamini	106	1.5
Turnout		7,126	

Piggs Peak election 2018
Party	Candidate	Votes	%
Independent	Clement Jabulani	4,736	70.1
Independent	Fiki Maseko	1,758	26.0
Independent	Sibongile Mavimbela	96	1.4
Independent	Mfanfikile Khumalo	84	1.2
Independent	Sikelela Tfusi	48	0.7
Independent	Angel Khumalo	36	0.5
Turnout		6,758	

Siphocosini election 2018
Party	Candidate	Votes	%
Independent	Mduduzi Matsebula	3,404	66.1
Independent	Bongani Dube	1,623	31.5
Independent	Khetsiwe Mkhwanazi	66	1.3
Independent	Hlobisile Sikhosana	56	1.1
Turnout		5,149	

Timpisini election 2018
Party	Candidate	Votes	%
Independent	Nelson Mamba	2,086	48.7
Independent	Jennifer Dupoint-Shiba	1,199	28.0
Independent	Patric Mamba	727	17.0
Independent	Sipho Ndwandwe	270	6.3
Turnout		4,282	
