= Never Ending Gardens =

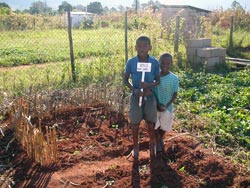
Garden 3082 planted during the first trip

Never Ending Gardens is a division of Dream for Africa, a religious-based non-profit organization based in Gainesville, Georgia, USA, and in Johannesburg, Gauteng, South Africa, that seeks to alleviate hunger in Africa by building sustainable vegetable gardens in communities to improve their diet.

While not a church or denomination, Dream for Africa is focusing on mobilising volunteers from various nations to partner with the people of Africa in achieving enduring breakthroughs related to hunger and food security, orphans and vulnerable children, poverty alleviation through skill enhancement and job creation, and AIDS prevention and care.

The Never Ending Gardens programme makes use of small backyard gardens, allowing for extensive ownership and involvement from the local community, and integrates support programmes to ensure sustainability. The objectives of the programme include hunger alleviation, provision of a nutritional balanced diet, restoration of dignity and respect within the family unit, and general and individual improvement of quality and quantity of life.

The Never Ending Gardens initiative is unlike most food initiatives in that it is not grain-focused, but rather provides vegetables known for their properties of improving the immune-system. The types of vegetables planted were selected in conjunction with the World Health Organization, National Cancer Institute, Micronutrient Initiative, CDC, agricultural agencies and UNAIDS recommendations.

== 1st NEG 2004 ==
23 April - 2 May Swaziland

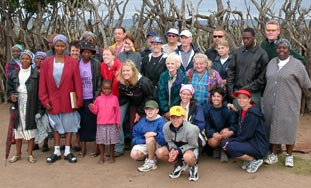
Dream for Africa Team

Benefit to readers

Swaziland was chosen to be the first implementation of the Never Ending Gardens project owing to its favourable proximity to the organisation’s South African headquarters, its manageable size in terms of population and geographical expanse, available water supply, and the high degree of poverty and HIV/AIDS infection rate.

Additionally, while unable to contribute funds to the project, Swazi officials were open to DFA entering the country and implementing the programme.

Phase one of the three-phase programme ran through the week of April 25–30, 2004, and involved the planting of 12,874 ‘simple gardens’ in 35 locations in the Mafutseni, Ntondozi, Ludzeludze and Mbangave localities. The project implementation team consisted of 122 volunteers from the United States and South Africa who moved through the localities, educating and planting a variety of seedlings.

The achievements of the group were substantial: 309,000 seedlings were purchased and planted including cabbage, spinach, onions and green peppers. In the seasons to follow, a far wider selection of vegetables will be introduced and rotated.

It is estimated that these gardens will supply immune system-boosting vegetables for over 50,000 individuals. As is well documented, the immune systems of most Africans are very poor, which substantially contributes to the infection rate and the rate of HIV/AIDS deaths.

The first phase showed that more than 85% of all homes did not have any garden of any type in the areas visited. The 70,000 gardens, which the completed initiative is expected to produce, will supply approximately 840,000 vegetables in the first year with 1,728,000 in the second. With an average of 8 people per household, each household would be able to harvest at least 2.5 vegetables a week growing to 5 vegetables per week in the second year.

During 2004, gardens were planted in three countries:

- Swaziland - 20,000 gardens
- Botswana - 20,000 gardens
- South Africa - 60,000 gardens
- Lesotho -

== See also ==
- Bruce Wilkinson
