= Bholekane =

Coordinates: 26.09°S 31.55°E

Bholekane also known as Balegana or Balegane is a town in the Hhohho Region of northern Eswatini, also known by its former official name Swaziland. The town is located on the banks of the Nkomati River, to the north of Mliba and south of Herefords; it is approximately 100 kilometers northeast of Mbabane, one of the two capitals (along with Lobamba).
