= Enkhaba =

Coordinates: 26.131°S 31.183°E

Enkhaba is a town in northwest Eswatini. It is located on the MR1 route to the north of Mbabane, between the towns of Piggs Peak and Motjane.
