= Mater Dolorosa Church, Mbabane =

Mater Dolorosa Church
- Mater Dolorosa Church
- 26.325°S 31.1499°E
- Location: Mbabane
- Country: Eswatini
- Denomination: Roman Catholic Church

The Mater Dolorosa Church or just Mater Dolorosa Parish, is a Catholic church located in the city of Mbabane, Eswatini (Swaziland). It is adjacent to a secondary and elementary school of the same name.

Unlike most African countries the main church, Our Lady of Assumption Cathedral, Manzini, is not located in the capital, but in another city. The name "Mater Dolorosa" (Our Lady of Sorrows) is one of the Latin forms of invocation of Mary.

== History ==
The church began as the mission of Mater Dolorosa, established in January 1914. On January 27, 2014, celebrations were held in this church celebrating 100 years of the Catholic Church in the nation. During a religious ceremony the finance minister collapsed and had to be treated.

== See also ==
- Roman Catholicism in Swaziland
- Mater Dolorosa
