= Our Lady of Assumption Cathedral, Manzini =

Coordinates: 26.5006°S 31.3774°E

Our Lady of Assumption Cathedral
- Our Lady of Assumption Cathedral
- Location: Manzini
- Country: Eswatini
- Denomination: Roman Catholic Church

The Our Lady of Assumption Cathedral or Cathedral of Manzini, is a religious building belonging to the Catholic Church and is located in the town of Manzini, in the district capital of the same name, and the most populous city and an important industrial and commercial center in Eswatini.

It is the seat of the Diocese of Manzini (Latin: Dioecesis Manziniensis) which was created in 1951 by the bull Suprema Nobis of Pope Pius XII. This included in the ecclesiastical province of Johannesburg in South Africa, whose leaders are bishops of Manzini since 1955.

It was visited by Pope John Paul II on September 16, 1988, on his tour in Africa.

== See also ==
- Catholic Church in Eswatini
- Mater Dolorosa Church, Mbabane
