= Mbabane River =

River in Eswatini

Coordinates: 26°26′S 31°12′E

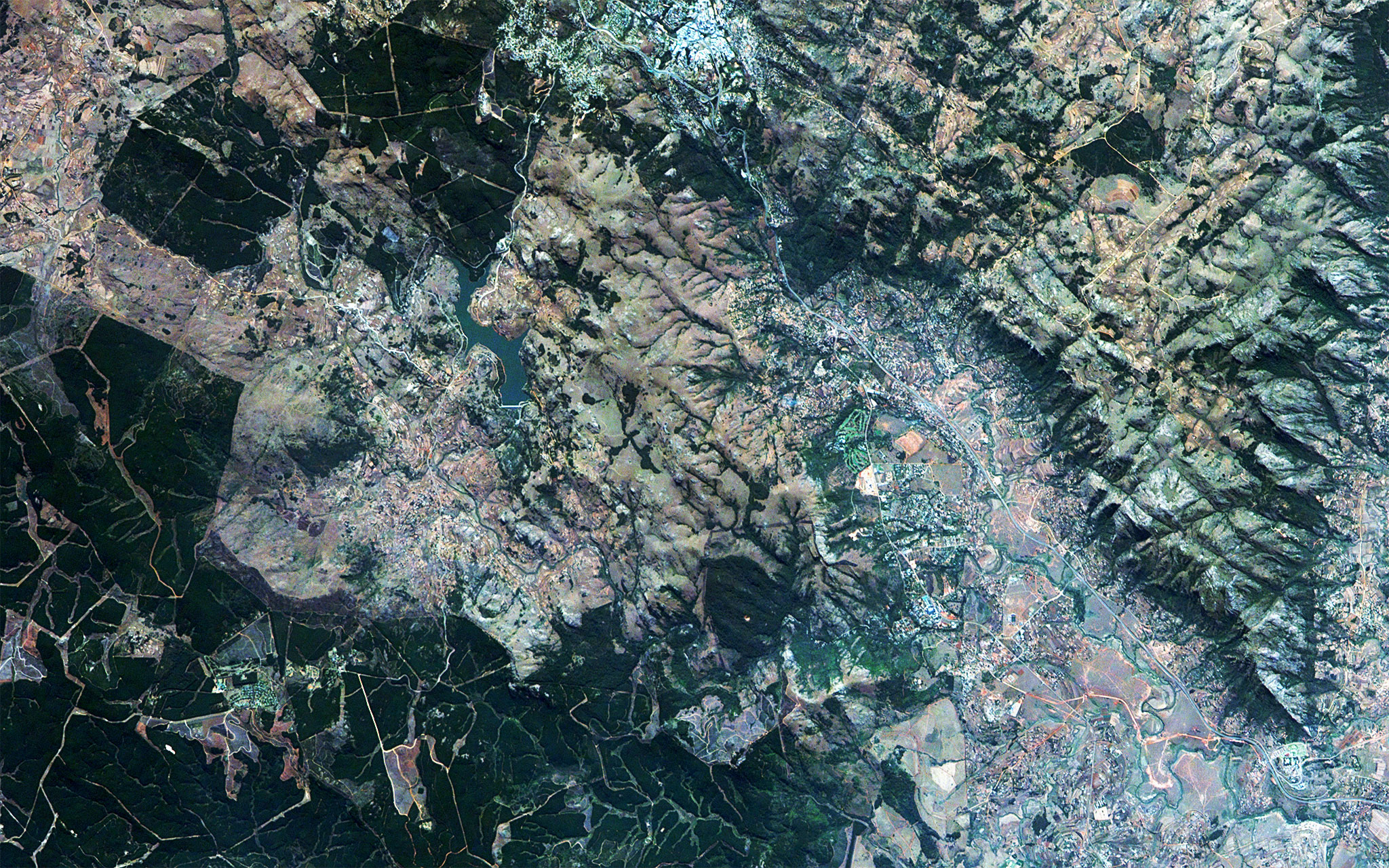
Mbabane River

The Mbabane River is a river of Eswatini. It flows through Hhohho District in the north-west of the country. The city of Mbabane is located along the river. Tributaries include the Polinjane River.

Mbabane river is a tributary of Lusushwana river and as such belongs to the Maputo River basin.

== See also ==
- Geography of Eswatini
