= Lucas Macie =

Lucas Macie (born 2 July 1960) is a Mozambiquan-Swazi painter.

== Biography ==
Macie was born in Maputo, Mozambique, in 1960 and grew up as an admirer of Malagatana, a renowned Mozambican painter. His brother Valentine is also a painter. Macie began showcasing his work in Maputo but left the country as a refugee and moved to Swaziland. There he continued paintings and showcased his work in the Indingilizi Gallery in Mbabane and gained recognition from the Swaziland Art Society. His paintings have since been bought by private collectors from South Africa, Spain, Portugal, Mozambique, United States, United Kingdom, Australia, Germany, Belgium, Switzerland, Israel, Zanzibar and Tanzania. His nephew is Valentim Macie, a painter like his father and uncle who has done much work to raise awareness for AIDS.

== Style ==
Macie is noted for his gentle use of color, painting mainly people. His reason for this he says is "The Big Master did the same - He created Adam and Eve". He also utilizes the use of symbolism in his works with rings or bracelets or round clay pots.
