= Ngwempisi =

Administrative division of Eswatini

Coordinates: 26.699897°S 31.288758°E

Ngwempisi is an inkhundla of Eswatini, located in the Manzini District. Its population as of the 2007 census was 27,232.
