= Mahlangatja =

Coordinates: 26°46′53″S 31°14′53″E

Mahlangatja is an inkhundla of Eswatini, located in the Manzini District. Its population as of the 2007 census was 18,788.
