= Lobamba Lomdzala =

Coordinates: 26.424070°S 31.186790°E

Lobamba Lomdzala is an inkhundla of Eswatini, located in the Manzini District. Its population as of the 2007 census was 18,797.
