= Manzini Region =

Manzini Region kaManzini
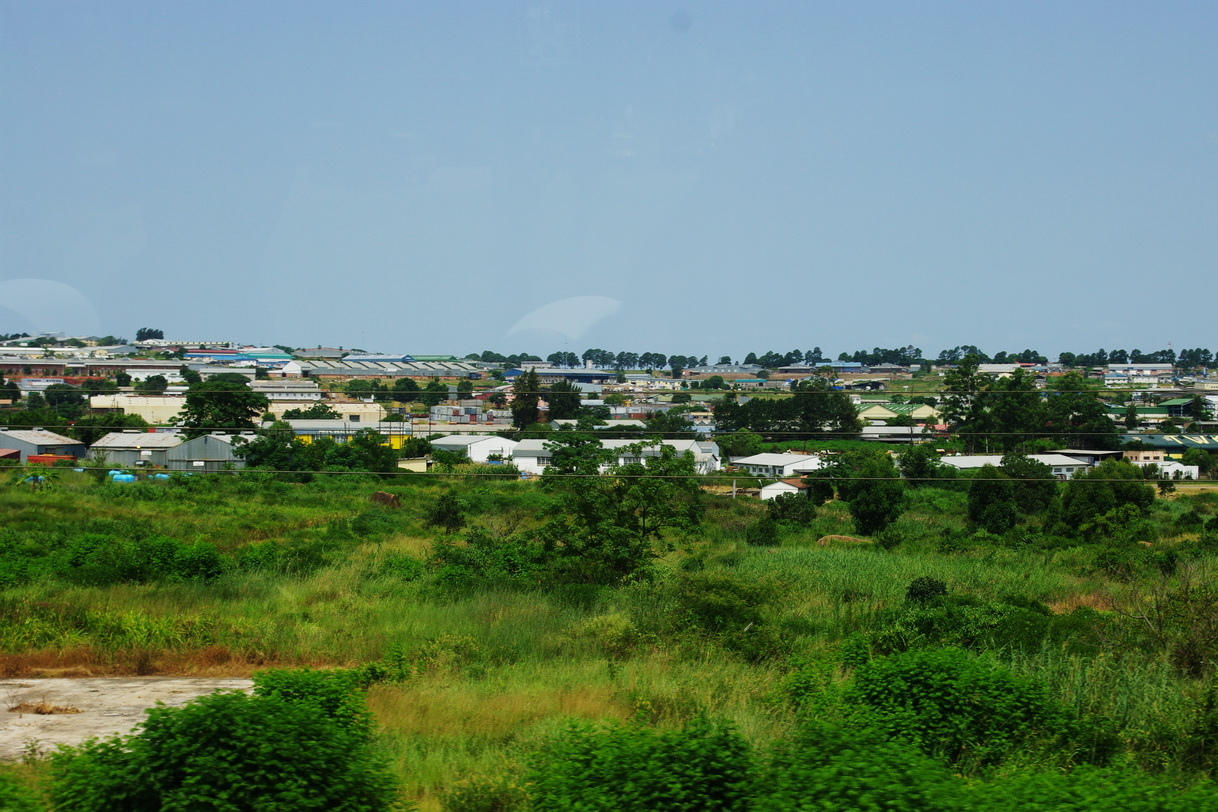
- Matsapha, an industrial town in Manzini Region

- Map of Eswatini showing Manzini district
- Coordinates: 26°15′S 31°30′E
- Country: Eswatini
- Capital: Manzini

Government
  - Regional Administrator: HRH Prince Masitsela
  - Regional Secretary: Mr Thamsanqa Mpandza

Area
  - Total: 4,093.59 km^{2} (1,580.54 sq mi)

Population (2017 census)
  - Total: 355,945
  - Density: 86.9518/km^{2} (225.204/sq mi)
- Time zone: UTC+2
- HDI (2017): 0.639 medium

Manzini is a region of Eswatini (formerly known as Swaziland), located in the center-west of the country. It has an area of 4,093.59 km^{2} and a population of 355,945 (2017). Its administrative center is Manzini. It borders all three other regions of Eswatini: Hhohho in the north, Lubombo in the east, and Shiselweni in the south. It is bordered by the Mpumalanga province in South Africa to the west.

== Administrative divisions ==
Manzini is subdivided to 16 tinkhundla (or constituencies). These are local administration centres, and also parliamentary constituencies. Each inkhundla is headed by an indvuna yenkhundla or governor with the help of bucopho. The tinkhundla are further divided into imiphakatsi (or chiefdoms). The present tinkhundla are:

- Ekukhanyeni
  - Imiphakatsi: Bhekinkhosi, Ebutfonweni, Embheka, Engcayini, Engwazini, Enkiliji, Ensenga, Enyakeni, Esankolweni, Eswaceni, Kantunja, Maliyaduma, Mdayaneni, Mkhulamini
- Hlambanyatsi
  - Imiphakatsi: Dingizwe, Lundzi, Mbangave, Mlindazwe, Zondwako
- Kwaluseni
  - Imiphakatsi: Kwalusenimhlane, Logoba
- Lamgabhi
  - Imiphakatsi: Dudusini, Emhlangeni, Engwenyameni, Kalamgabhi, Kaluhleko
- Lobamba Lomdzala
  - Imiphakatsi: Luyengo, Malkerns
- Ludzeludze
  - Imiphakatsi: Ekudzeni, Enkamanzi, Esibuyeni, Esigombeni, Mbekelweni, Usweni, Zombodze
- Mafutseni
  - Imiphakatsi: Engculwini, Etimbutini, Kabhudla, Kankhambule, Luhlokohla, Mafutseni
- Mahlangatja
  - Imiphakatsi: Bhahwini, Ebuseleni, Eludvondvolweni, Eluzelweni, Emambatfweni, Empolonjeni, Kazulu, Mgomfelweni, Nsangwini, Sigcineni
- Mangcongco
  - Imiphakatsi: Dwalile, Mafutseni, Mangcongco, Ncabaneni, Sandlane
- Manzini North
  - Imiphakatsi: Edwaleni, Emakholweni, Mnyenyweni, Mzimnene
- Manzini South
  - Imiphakatsi: Lwandle, Mjingo, Moneni, Zakhele
- Mkhiweni
  - Imiphakatsi: Dvokolwako, Ekutsimleni, Mbelebeleni
- Mtfongwaneni
  - Imiphakatsi: Bulunga, Ehlane, Gundwini, Lwandle, Ndlandlameni
- Ngwempisi
  - Imiphakatsi: Bhadzeni I, Bhadzeni II, Elushikishini, Emahhashini, Emaqudvulwini, Engcoseni, Enhlulweni, Etshebovu, Khabonina, Mgazini, Velezizweni
- Nhlambeni
  - Imiphakatsi: Dwaleni, Kashali, Njelu
- Ntondozi
  - Imiphakatsi: Egebeni, Empini, Endlini Lembi, Kandinda, Ncabaneni, Ntondozi
