= José Luís Gerardo Ponce de León =

South African Roman Catholic prelate (born 1961)

The Most Reverend José Luís Gerardo Ponce de León
- Bishop of Manzini, eSwatini
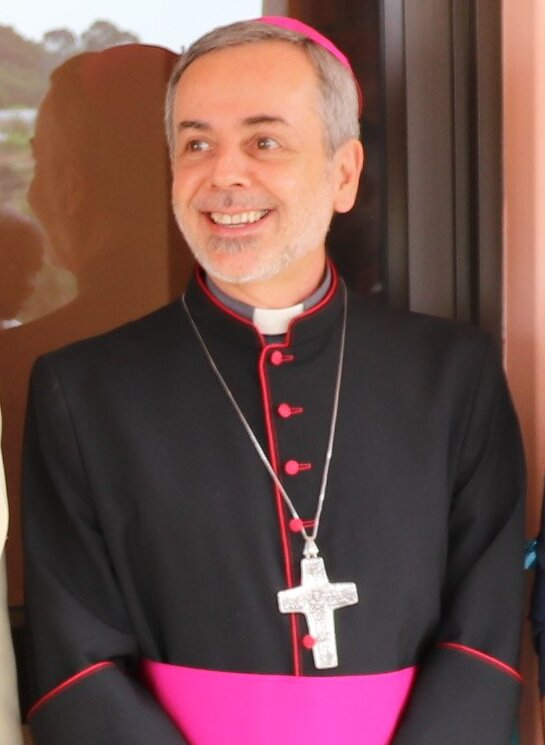
- Church: Catholic Church
- Archdiocese: Roman Catholic Archdiocese of Johannesburg
- See: Manzini
- Appointed: 29 November 2013
- Installed: 26 January 2014
- Predecessor: Louis Ncamiso Ndlovu
- Successor: Incumbent

Orders
- Ordination: 2 August 1986
- Consecration: 18 April 2009 by James Patrick Green
- Rank: Bishop

Personal details
- Born: José Luís Gerardo Ponce de León; 8 May 1961 (age 65) Buenos Aires, Archdiocese of Buenos Aires, Argentina

Styles of José Luís Gerardo Ponce de León
- Reference style: Your Lordship; The Most Reverend
- Spoken style: His Lordship
- Religious style: Bishop

José Luís Gerardo Ponce de León (Consolata Missionaries), (born 8 May 1961), is an Argentine-born South African Roman Catholic prelate who is the Bishop of the Roman Catholic Diocese of Manzini, eSwatini since November 2013. He was appointed bishop by Pope Benedict XVI on 24 November 2008. He was consecrated at Mtubatuba, Kwazulu Natal, South Africa on 18 April 2009. He served as the Apostolic Vicar of the Apostolic Vicariate of Ingwavuma, South Africa from 24 November 2008 until 30 April 2016. He concurrently served as Titular Bishop of Maturba from 24 November 2008 until 29 November 2013.

== Background and education ==
He was born on 8 May 1961 in Buenos Aires Argentina, in the Roman Catholic Archdiocese of Buenos Aires. After completing high school, he became a member of the order of Consolata Missionaries. He studied philosophy. He then studied theology in Colombia, South America. He was ordained a priest of his Catholic Religious Order on 2 August 1986.

== Priest ==
He took his preliminary vows as a member of the Consolata Missionaries on 9 January 1983. He then took his perpetual vows on 28 December 1985. He was ordained a priest of the Consolata Missionaries, a Catholic Religious Order on 28 March 1998. He served as priest until 24 November 2008.

After ordination, he served in various roles including as a priest in Argentina. He relocated to South Africa. He then spent 11 years in Dundee, KwaZulu-Natal, learnt the Zulu language and became a citizen of South Africa.

== Bishop ==
On 24 November 2008, Pope Benedict XVI appointed Father José Luís Gerardo Ponce de León, as Apostolic Administrator of the Apostolic Vicariate of Ingwavuma, South Africa. He was also concurrently appointed Titular Bishop of Maturba. On 18 April 2009, he was consecrated and installed at Mtubatuba, Vicariate of Ingwavuma, in KwaZulu-Natal, South Africa. The Principal Consecrator was Archbishop James Patrick Green, Titular Archbishop of Altinum assisted by Archbishop Buti Joseph Tlhagale, Archbishop of Johannesburg and Bishop Michael Vincent Paschal Rowland, Bishop Emeritus of Dundee.

On 29 November 2013 Pope Francis appointed him as Bishop of the Roman Catholic Diocese of Manzini, eSwatini. He was appointed the same day as Apostolic Administrator of Ingwavuma, South Africa. He was installed at Manzini on 26 January 2014. His administration of Ingwavuma ceased on 30 April 2016.

== See also ==
- Catholic Church in Eswatini

== Succession table ==
Catholic Church titles
Preceded by Louis Ncamiso Ndlovu (1 July 1985 - 27 August 2012)	Bishop of Manzini (since 29 November 2013)	Succeeded by Incumbent
