= Apostolic Vicariate of Ingwavuma =

Catholic missionary jurisdiction in South Africa

Apostolic vicariate of Ingwavuma Vicariatus Apostolicus Ingvavumensis

Location
- Country: South Africa
- Metropolitan: Immediately subject to the Holy See
- Coordinates: 27°06′S 32°00′E

Statistics
- Area: 12,369 km^{2} (4,776 sq mi)
- Population: Total; Catholics: (as of 2014); 748,685; 26,233 (3.5%)

Information
- Denomination: Catholic Church
- Sui iuris church: Latin Church
- Rite: Roman Rite
- Cathedral: Cathedral of the Good Shepherd and Our Lady of Sorrows, Hlabisa

Current leadership
- Bishop: Vusumuzi Francis Mazibuko

The Apostolic Vicariate of Ingwavuma (Latin: Vicariatus Apostolicus Ingvavumensis) is a Latin Catholic apostolic vicariate located in Ingwavuma (Umkhanyakude District Municipality) in South Africa.

== History ==
- 12 November 1962: Established as Apostolic Prefecture of Ingwavuma from the Diocese of Eshowe and Diocese of Manzini
- 19 November 1990: Promoted as Apostolic Vicariate of Ingwavuma

== Leadership ==
- Prefects Apostolic of Ingwavuma
  - Fr. Edwin Roy Kinch, O.S.M. (13 November 1962 – 9 May 1970)
  - Fr. Anselm Donald Mary Dennehy, O.S.M. (Apostolic Administrator 8 May 1970 – 1976)
  - Fr. Michael Mary O'Shea, O.S.M. (9 January 1976 – 19 November 1990)
- Vicars Apostolic of Ingwavuma
  - Bishop Michael Mary O'Shea, O.S.M. (19 November 1990 – 30 May 2006)
  - Bishop José Luís Gerardo Ponce de León, I.M.C. (24 November 2008 – 29 November 2013), appointed Bishop of Manzini
  - Bishop Mandla Siegfried Jwara, C.M.M. (30 April 2016 - 9 June 2021)
  - Bishop Vusumuzi Francis Mazibuko, O.M.I (20 March 2023 – present)
