= Sihhoya =

Coordinates: 25.927°S 31.673°E

Sihhoya, or Sihaya, is a town in northern Eswatini. It is situated close to the Sand River Reservoir to the north of Bholekane, near the South African border.
