= Manzini North =

Coordinates: 26°29′S 31°22′E

Manzini North is an inkhundla of Eswatini, located in the Manzini District. Its population as of the 2007 census was 39,529.
