= Louis Ncamiso Ndlovu =

Swazi Roman Catholic bishop

Louis Ncamiso Ndlovu OSM
- Bishop of Manzini
- Church: Catholic Church
- Diocese: Diocese of Manzini
- In office: 1 July 1985 – 27 August 2012
- Predecessor: Aloysius Isaac Mandlenkhosi Zwane
- Successor: José Luís Gerardo Ponce de León

Orders
- Ordination: 4 May 1978
- Consecration: 12 October 1985 by Mansuet Dela Biyase

Personal details
- Born: 15 March 1945 Enkhaba, Swaziland Protectorate, British Empire
- Died: 27 August 2012 (aged 67)

Louis Ncamiso Ndlovu (March 15, 1945 – August 27, 2012) was the Roman Catholic bishop of the Roman Catholic Diocese of Manzini, Swaziland.

Ordained to the priesthood in 1975, Ndlovu was named a bishop in 1985; he died in office.
