= Nhlambeni =

Coordinates: 26°38′43″S 31°23′54″E

Nhlambeni is an inkhundla of Eswatini, located in the Manzini District. Its population as of the 2007 census was 12,466.
