= Hlambanyatsi =

Coordinates: 26°27′10″S 31°24′08″E

Hlambanyatsi is an inkhundla of Eswatini, located in the Manzini District. Its population as of the 2007 census was 8,982.
