= Mtfongwaneni =

Inkhundla of Eswatini

Coordinates: 26°35′00″S 31°29′38″E

Mtfongwaneni is an inkhundla of Eswatini, located in the Manzini District. Its population as of the 2007 census was 17,302.
