= Manzini South =

Administrative area of Eswatini

Coordinates: 26°29′S 31°22′E

Manzini South is an inkhundla of Eswatini, located in the Manzini District. Its population as of the 2007 census was 15,417.
