= Mangcongco =

Coordinates: 26°34′59″S 30°59′49″E

Mangcongco is an inkhundla of Eswatini, located in the Manzini District. Its population as of the 2007 census was 6,603.
