= Lucas Mlambo =

Swazi painter (born 1959)

Lucas Mlambo (born 28 December 1959 in Sidvwashini, Mbabane) is a Swazi painter.

== Biography ==
The only boy of eight children, his father died when he was very young and was raised by his mother whilst attending Lozita Secondary School. In 1984, the Mlambo family were forced to relocate by the government to make way for roads and he began drawing to remember his childhood home. He got a job in Beral and developed his skills in painting at the weekends and selling them to his colleagues. In 1985, a man named Dori whom he met at the Indingilizi Gallery recognized his talent and encouraged him to exhibit. The following year he did so at the gallery, with Lisa Forslund from Sweden.

In 1991, Mlambo painted five murals at Indingilizi to depict the Reed Dance Ceremony. He has since showcased his works in Total Gallery in Johannesburg and University of Zululand in KwaZulu-Natal, South Africa, Grahamstown Arts Festival, at the Swaziland Arts Society, and in Denmark and the United States. His paintings are noted for their bright colours, often in lively scenes, and generally capture everyday life and landmarks in the country. Mlambo has said “Many people like my paintings. I like to use bright colours. In my work, you can see how people in Swaziland live and what they do. I like Mbabane very much because when I see the mountains I see something to paint. When I see the streets, people and buildings, I see something to paint. Even in the location where I stay, I find many stories to paint to show how the people live and what they do.” Notable works include After the Storm, Washing Day - Manzini, Nhlangano Town Mshengu St and Nhlangano - Old Bus Rank. Mlambo is married with a son and a daughter.
