= Young Heroes (organization) =

Young Heroes is a charity, based in Mbabane, Swaziland. With a focus on orphaned and vulnerable children and their elderly caretakers, Young Heroes directly addresses the HIV/AIDS epidemic in Swaziland — the nation with the world’s highest rate of infection — on three fronts: education and prevention; healthcare; and impact mitigation/poverty reduction.

== History ==
Young Heroes was created in 2006 as an initiative by Swaziland’s National Emergency Response Council on HIV/AIDS (NERCHA). Its original program links sponsors who provide monthly life-support grants with orphan families in need. These stipends give them funds for food, clothing, school fees and other necessities, allowing them to stay together as a family on their homesteads.

In 2009, the organization launched its Healthcare Program, followed by the Skills Training Empowerment Program (STEP) in 2013. In 2014, Young Heroes became an independently registered NGO in Swaziland. In the autumn of 2015, thanks to the generosity of the American people, Young Heroes received a three-year grant from USAID and the President’s Emergency Plan for AIDS Relief (PEPFAR) via PACT to undertake the Umliba Loya Embili, DREAMS and WORTH projects.

In 2016, a grant from the government of the Kingdom of the Netherlands through the International HIV/AIDS Alliance and CANGO enabled Young Heroes to implement READY+ in Swaziland. In 2017, the Thomas Engel Foundation asked Young Heroes to assume management of its network of Neighborhood Care Points (NCPs), where orphans receive a daily meal, basic medical care and pre-school education. To run this project, called Litsemba ("hope" in siSwati), Young Heroes opened a satellite office in Nhlangano.

== Organization ==
Young Heroes now has a staff of 27 and a network of over 180 community-based volunteers throughout Swaziland. It is affiliated with the U.S.-based Young Heroes Foundation, which was created at the same time as the Swazi operation.

== Programs ==
• Life Support Grants: Young Heroes links families of double orphans with sponsors who provide monthly stipends for basic necessities such as food, clothing and school fees. The stipends are sent directly to the family caretaker via mobile money or their nearest local post office.

• Health Care: At Young Heroes’ Family Days held at clinics throughout the country, children are examined by a medical practitioner; receive HIV/AIDS and abuse education; and are offered HIV testing and counseling, TB screening and voluntary male circumcision. Those who are HIV+ receive free medication and follow-up home visits, and are enrolled in monthly Teen Club support groups. They are also invited to attend the annual Sivivane Camp, which is run in conjunction with Newman’s Own SeriousFun Camps. Over 5,000 children have attended the Family Days.

• Skills Training Empowerment Program (STEP): Upon turning 19 or completing secondary school, Young Heroes’ orphans become eligible for a free, year-long training course in their choice of eight vocations and business management. Since its inception in 2013, just over 300 young adults have participated in STEP.

• Umliba Loya: This program consists of assessing and addressing the needs of 7,200 orphans and vulnerable children in Swaziland’s Hhohho region with individualized support, including home-based HIV care; funds for education; and abuse intervention and counseling.

• DREAM: 3,900 adolescent girls participate in these school-based clubs, which teach life skills; decision-making; sexual and reproductive health; HIV education; and offer HIV testing/counseling.

• WORTH: This community-based savings and micro-entrepreneurship program for groups of female caretakers of orphans and vulnerable children teach financial literacy and parenting skills. Over 2,600 women now are members; together, they have saved over $150,000 .

• READY+: This program provides psychosocial support, community mobilization and advocacy for young adults to the age of 24 who are living with HIV.

• Litsemba: Funded by the Thomas Engel Foundation in conjunction with other German foundations and Rotary Club of Mbabane, this network of Neighborhood Care Points offers nutritious food to orphans; pre-school education for the youngest children; a mobile clinic that provides basic healthcare; and income-generating projects for the NCP caregivers who volunteer their time.
