= Ekukhanyeni =

Settlement in Eswatini

Coordinates: 26°23′15″S 31°31′41″E

Ekukhanyeni is an inkhundla of Eswatini, located in the Manzini District. Its population as of the 2007 census was 18,085.
