= Mhlangatane =

Inkhundla of Eswatini

Coordinates: 26°18′18″S 31°06′53″E

Mhlangatane is an inkhundla of Eswatini, located in the Hhohho District. Its population as of the 2007 census was 22,421.
