= Aloysius Isaac Mandlenkhosi Zwane =

Liswati catholic bishop

- Bishop of Manzini
- Church: Catholic Church
- Diocese: Diocese of Manzini
- In office: 24 January 1976 – 10 August 1980
- Predecessor: Girolamo Maria Casalini
- Successor: Louis Ncamiso Ndlovu

Orders
- Ordination: 12 July 1964
- Consecration: 16 May 1976 by Mansuet Dela Biyase

Personal details
- Born: 6 May 1932 Msunduza, Mbabane, Swaziland Protectorate, British Empire
- Died: 10 August 1980 (aged 48)

Aloysius Isaac Mandlenkhosi Zwane (1932-1980) was a Liswati clergyman and bishop for the Roman Catholic Diocese of Manzini.

== Biography ==
He was born on 6 May 1932 in Msunduze.He received his education first in an Anglican school at Esigangeni and later in Sandla Township. He then attended Matsapa High School and later finished at Salesian High School at Manzini.He studied philosophy and theology at St Peter’s Seminary. He was ordained in 1964. He was appointed in 1976. He died in a car accident in 1980.

== Reception ==
He was remembered by the church as a "progressive priest" who was concerned with the refugees in south africa.
