= Mkhiweni =

Coordinates: 26°11′47″S 31°34′07″E

Mkhiweni is an inkhundla of Eswatini, located in the Manzini District. Its population as of the 2007 census was 23,929.
