= Luve =

- Village
- Interactive map of Luve
- Location in Eswatini (Swaziland)
- Coordinates: 26°19′16″S 31°28′31″E

Luve is a town in central Eswatini (Swaziland). It is located on the MR5 route between Mpisi and Mliba, 25 kilometres northeast of Manzini.
