= Mbabane East =

Coordinates: 26°19′S 31°08′E

Mbabane East is an inkhundla of Eswatini, located in the Hhohho District. Its population as of the 2007 census was 36,792.
