= Pellegrino Bellezze =

Brazilian catholic bishop

Pellegrino Bellezze OSM
- Prefect of Swaziland
- Church: Catholic Church
- See: Apostolic Prefecture of Swaziland
- In office: 15 March 1923 – May 1933
- Predecessor: Prefecture erected
- Successor: Romualdo Migliorini

Orders
- Ordination: 21 December 1907

Personal details
- Born: 10 January 1884 São José dos Campos, São Paulo Province, Empire of Brazil
- Died: 18 August 1961 (aged 77)

Pellegrino Bellezze (born 10 Jan 1884 in São José dos Campos) was a Brazilian clergyman and bishop for the Roman Catholic Diocese of Manzini. He was ordained in 1907. He was appointed in 1923. He died in 1961.
