= Costantino Maria Attilio Barneschi =

Italian catholic bishop

Costantino Maria Attilio Barneschi OSM
- Bishop of Manzini
- Church: Catholic Church
- Diocese: Diocese of Manzini
- In office: 15 March 1939 – 21 May 1965
- Predecessor: Romualdo Migliorini
- Successor: Girolamo Maria Casalini
- Previous post: Titular Bishop of Thagaste (1939-1951)

Orders
- Ordination: 18 September 1919
- Consecration: 30 April 1939 by Bernhard Jordaan Gijlswijk

Personal details
- Born: 24 June 1892 Foiano della Chiana, Province of Arezzo, Kingdom of Italy
- Died: 21 May 1965 (aged 72)

Costantino Maria Attilio Barneschi (born 24 Jun 1892 in Foiano della Chiana) was an Italian clergyman and bishop for the Roman Catholic Diocese of Manzini. He was ordained in 1919. He was appointed in 1959. He died in 1965.
