= Veronica Sentongo =

Ugandan electric engineer and corporate executive

- Born: c. 1993 (age 32–33); Mbabane, Eswatini
- Education: University of Cape Town
- Occupations: Electric engineer and Corporate executive
- Years active: 2004 – present
- Known for: Innovation
- Title: Chief Change & Innovation Officer at DFCU Bank

Veronica Sentongo (born circa 1993), is a Ugandan telecommunications and electrical engineer, who works as the Chief Change & Innovation Officer at DFCU Bank, a large commercial bank in Uganda. She began her current assignment in January 2021. Before joining DFCU Bank, she was the Group Head of Digital Innovation at ICEA Lion Insurance Company in Nairobi, Kenya.

== Background and Education ==
Veronica was born to Ugandan parents in Mbabane, Eswatini, in the early 1990s. She studied at Mount Saint Mary's College Namagunga for her A-Level studies. She holds a Bachelor of Science degree in Electrical Engineering, awarded by the University of Cape Town. Her degree of Master of Science in electrical engineering, with specialization in telecommunications engineering, was awarded by the same university. She studied for her master's degree on scholarship awarded by the Council for Scientific and Industrial Research (SCIR), based in Pretoria, South Africa.

She attended management and leadership training in various institutions over the years. "She is a certified Technical Project management expert". She is an accredited expert in "Microfinance, Financial inclusion and Digital money".

== Career ==
Veronica's work career goes ack to 2004. Her first job was as a trainee engineer at Multi-Konsults Engineering Consultancy, in Kampala, Uganda. Later, she transferred to MTN Uganda, where she worked in the Network Switch Planning Unit. In addition, she worked as the Head of Digital Banking at Stanbic Bank Uganda Limited. She also worked in various roles in financial institutions in South Africa, during and after her postgraduate studies.

== Other considerations ==
In her role of Chief Change & Innovation Officer, Veronica Sentongo is a member of the executive committee of DFCU Bank.
