= Lamgabhi =

Coordinates: 26.561411°S 31.075010°E

Lamgabhi is an inkhundla of Eswatini, located in the Manzini District. Its population as of the 2007 census was 11,924.
