= Maguga Dam =

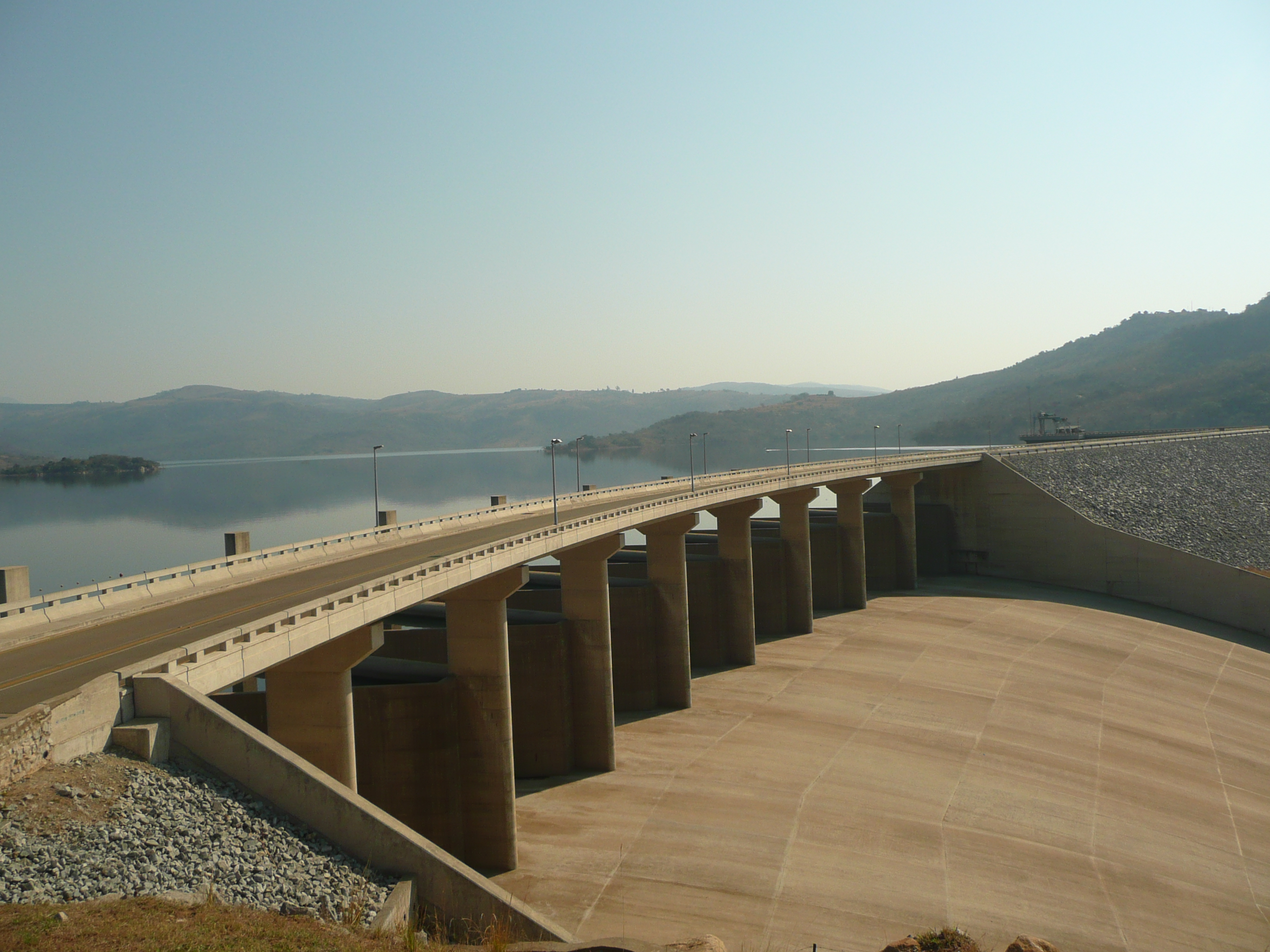

- Location within Eswatini
- Official name: Maguga Dam
- Location: Hhohho, Eswatini
- Coordinates: 26°04′37″S 31°15′34″E
- Opening date: 2001

Dam and spillways
- Type of dam: earth-fill/rock-fill
- Impounds: Komati River
- Height: 115 m (377 ft)

Reservoir
- Creates: Maguga Dam Reservoir
- Total capacity: 332,000,000m³

The Maguga Dam is a dam on the Komati River in Eswatini. It is 115 metres (377 ft) high and is located about 12 kilometres (7.5 mi) south of Piggs Peak. It was built as a joint project of the governments of South Africa and Eswatini. As of 2005, it was the largest public works project ever undertaken by Eswatini. The dam was completed in mid-2001.

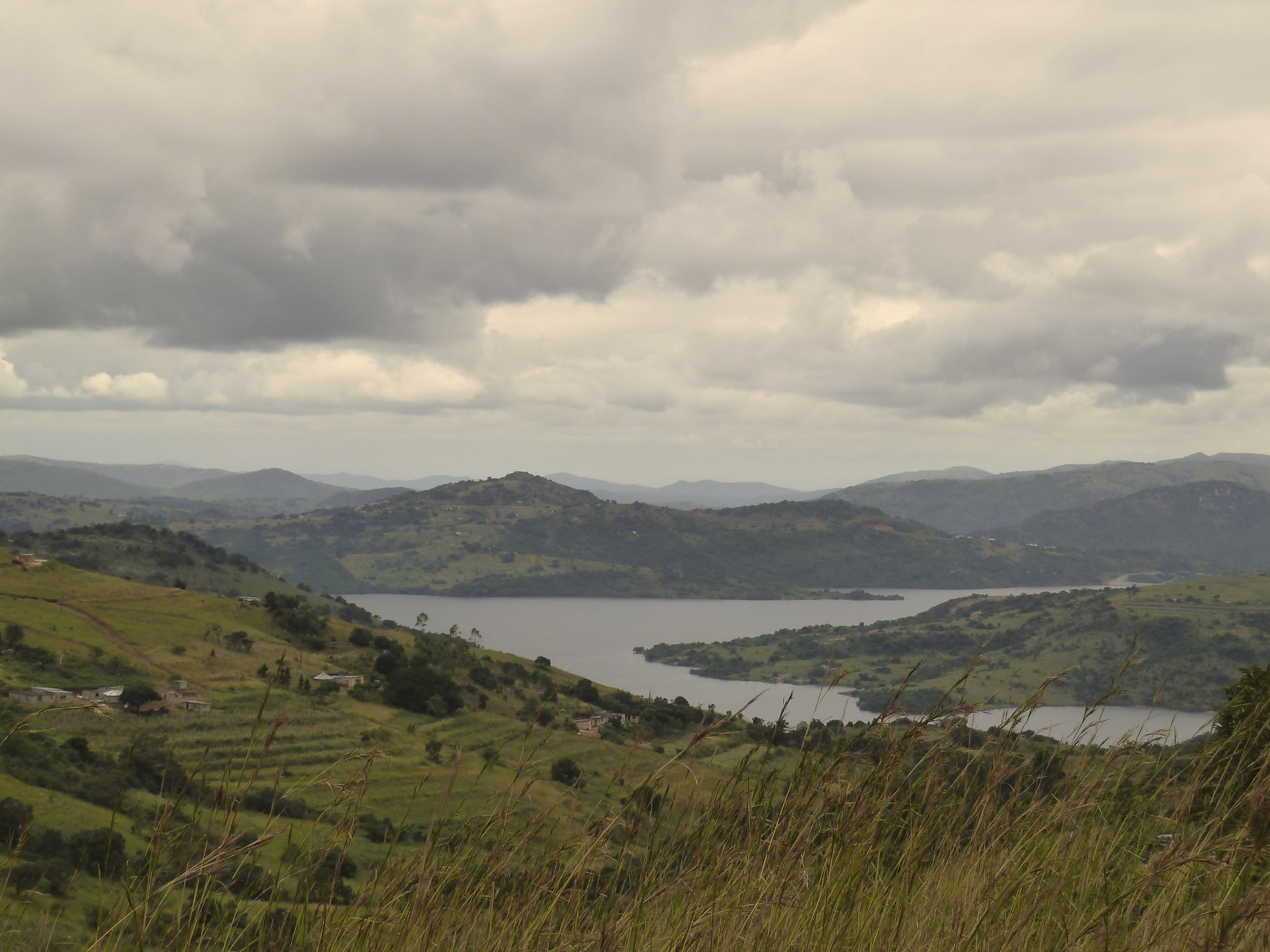

== Planning and purpose ==
In 1992, the eSwatini and South Africa governments signed a treaty covering the "design, construction, operation and maintenance" of the Driekoppies and Maguga Dams. As the former benefited South Africa exclusively (though the resulting reservoir lay partially in Eswatini), South Africa bore the entire cost for that dam. As for the latter, Eswatini was responsible for about 40% of the cost. The dam's primary purpose is irrigation (for water-intensive sugar cane, forestry and "about 1000 of Eswatini's small farmers") but a hydroelectric power station with a capacity of 20 MW (generated from two units, each with a capacity of 9.9 MW) was to be completed in October 2006.

== Description ==
Maguga is a "clay-core rockfill embankment dam". The dam embankment comprises approximately 800,000 cubic metres (28,000,000 cu ft) of clay, 2,800,000 cubic metres (99,000,000 cu ft) of granite rock and 43,000 cubic metres (1,500,000 cu ft) of filter material. It has an overall height of 115 metres (377 ft), a crest length of 870 metres (2,850 ft) and a base width of 400 metres (1,300 ft). It has a capacity of 332,000,000 cubic metres (1.17×10^{10} cu ft) and a surface area of 10,420,000 cubic metres (368,000,000 cu ft). It has been designed to withstand a probable maximum flood of 15,000 cubic metres per second (530,000 cu ft/s). There is a 181-metre (594 ft)-long labyrinth spillway.

== Water levels and displacement ==
Droughts have caused major problems. In 2007, the dam's capacity was down to 37%. In 2015, the water levels at the dam were at a record low, and on 20 February 2016, the water storage level was measured at 31%.

The project displaced about 1000 people.

== Awards ==
The Maguga Dam Joint Venture received a commendation from the South African Association of Consulting Engineers in the category of Engineering Excellence with a value greater than R5 million for 2002. The dam also won the Concrete Society of Southern Africa's 2003 Fulton Award for Civil Engineering Structures.
