= Herefords =

Coordinates: 25°50′S 31°30′E

Herefords is a town in northern Eswatini. It is located between the towns of Ngonini and Bholekane.
