= Komati Gorge =

River valley in South Africa

Coordinates: 25°52′07″S 30°18′26″E

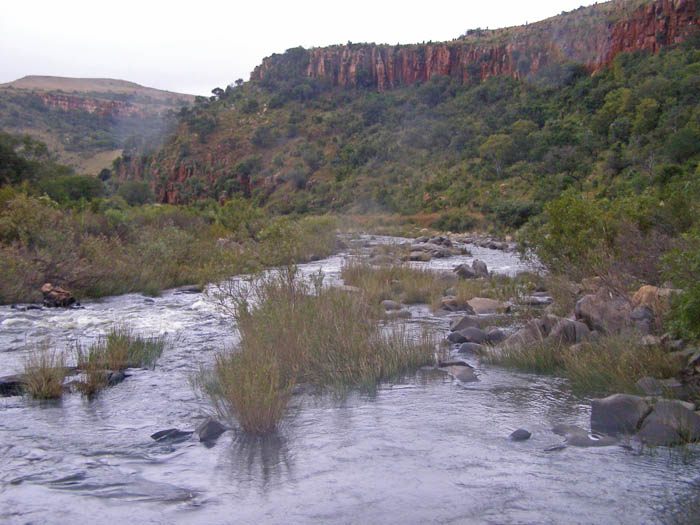
Komati Gorge looking south

Komati Gorge is a river valley in the Mpumalanga Province in central South Africa, which features vertical sandstone cliffs that provide habitat for a wide diversity of wildlife. Komati Gorge is located near the communities of Carolina and Machadodorp. The Komati River flows through the gorge and provides riparian cover for many species of flora and fauna, including several endemic endangered species and big game animals. The geology of the vertical cliffs of the gorge offer a diverse set of colourful mineralized exposures.

== Geology ==
Within the Komati Gorge are exposures of the Kromberg Formation and upper Hooggenoeg Formation of the Onverwacht Series in which debris flows, turbidites, and thin gray chert units are exhibited. There are also exposures of black and white banded cherts interbedded with basalt flows representing eastern faces of Black Reef Chert. A banded iron formation is exposed in the bluffs.

== Ecology ==
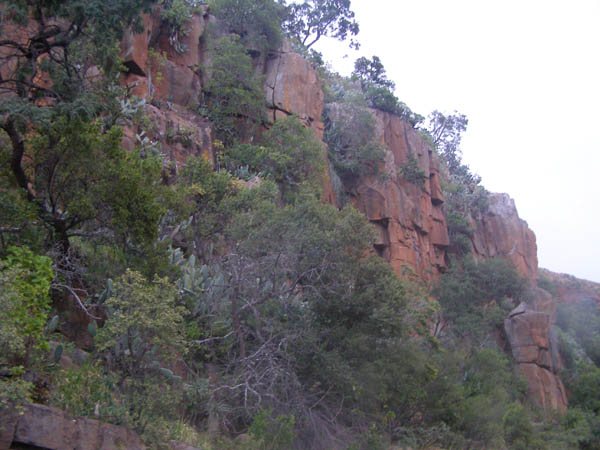
Komati Gorge western cliffs.

The Komati Gorge contains a great diversity of flora and fauna, including many large mammalian species. There are several discrete types of habitat present, including riparian zone, bluff habitat, thorn bushveld and highveld grassland. The river provides not only water for wildlife and aquatic vegetation, but also supports a robust riverine trout fishery. The bluffs support a very specialized ecosystem including vegetation adapted to the steep rocky vertical landform of the gorge sides. In addition there are favourable opportunities for bird habitat, providing more protection from certain predators; for example the threatened southern bald ibis inhabits these cliff habitats.

Mammal species include big game animals as well as smaller fauna; for example zebra and giraffe can be found on the bushveld. Eland, Impala and other bovids are numerous.

Approximately three million years ago the underlying geological formations took shape in the Komati Gorge area, producing one of the Earth's rarest and most endangered ecosystems, the ancient grasslands of Africa. With increasing rainfall on the lowlands, an invasion of trees ensued, constituting the bushveld of the lowveld ecosystems present here.

== Access and condition ==
Access is from the north, via the towns of Carolina or Machadodorp, which towns are near the main highway leading to Johannesburg. Most of the Komati Gorge has been historically privately owned wilderness, with some ranching arriving in the latter half of the 20th century. Since the late 20th century there has been limited development of a lodge and a few country homes.

As of 2006, visitation to the Komati Gorge is not intense, although there has been a recent case of geo-vandalism in the form of illegal drilling of some of the rock outcrops. Geo-vandalism is a term meaning defacing, alteration or drilling in significant rock formations either for unauthorised fossil collection, mineral exploration or malicious destruction.
