= Mliba =

Settlement of Manzini region, Eswatini

Coordinates: 26°15′S 31°35′E

Mliba is a town located geographically in the east-central region of Eswatini, situated in the southeastern part of Africa. It is positioned along the MR5 route to the northeast of Manzini, between the towns of Luve and Madlangempisi. The current Chief Madvubane Magagula is the authorized legal figure of the Dvokolwako area, overseeing one royal kraals (umphakatsi) named eSilindzini. On October 22, 2022, at eMvelo lendzala, located around Mliba, the area's new Chief, known as Madubane assumed the role of the area's traditional leader.

Mliba hosts a police station, a Nazarene mission comprising a primary school, a clinic functioning as a healthcare center, and Mliba High School.

The residents of Mliba engage in farming as a long-standing and recognized tradition, primarily involving livestock rearing and cultivation of crops like maize. The area boasts a diverse array of natural resources, including wild plants, birds, flora, rocks, and favorable weather conditions.

The Mliba mountain takes on a pyramid shape and holds significant importance for the Magagula royalty. This is the final resting place for numerous Suthu kings. It is believed that disturbing their graveyards may bring about a generational curse. The late Senator Chief Malamlela's final resting place remains somewhere around Mliba.

Mliba town was established by the Magagula, and it is positioned just above the well-known hill called Mkhutsali (Moyeni's Fortress).

As a result, Mliba serves as the central hub connecting smaller towns such as Ka-Khuphuka, Mnjoli, and Ka-Dvokolwako.
