= Maturba =

Locality in Algeria

Roman Empire - Mauretania Caesariensis (125 AD)

Maturba is a locality in Algeria, North Africa.

During the Roman Empire there was a Roman town located here. That town flourished in late antiquity from AD 300 to AD640. The town did not last long after the Muslim conquest of the Maghreb.

Maturba was also the seat of an ancient titular bishopric of the Roman Catholic Church. The bishopric survives today as a titular see. The current bishop is Paul Simick who replaced José Luís Gerardo Ponce de León in 2014.
