= Mayiwane =

Coordinates: 25.9404°S 31.448°E

Mayiwane is an inkhundla of Eswatini, located in the Hhohho District. Its population at the 2007 census was 15,120.
