= Hhukwini =

Coordinates: 26°19′11″S 31°13′20″E

Hhukwini is an inkhundla of Eswatini, located in the Hhohho District. Its population as of the 2007 census was 9,837.
