= Ntfonjeni =

Inkhundla of Eswatini

Coordinates: 25.826269°S 31.321150°E

Ntfonjeni is an inkhundla of Eswatini, located in the Hhohho District. Its population as of the 2007 census was 21,142.
