= Dolomite rock failure in South Africa =

The Chuniespoort Group in South Africa contains abundant, thick strata of dolomite deposits that range in depth from 40 m at Carolina, Mpumalanga to 2340 m at Penge and 2130 m at Rustenburg. The Transvaal Supergroup is home to the majority of South Africa's dolomite rocks. The Penge Formation and other dolomite series are analogous to the Chuniespoort Group.... This carbonate rock was created when fluids high in magnesium chemically change limestone to dolostone. With a mean annual rainfall of 700 mm over the past century, these dolomite rocks are ≈ 2500 Ma, which supports the carbonate rock's chemical weathering.

== Dolomitic failure mechanisms ==
Failure results from dolomite rocks dissolving in mildly acidic groundwater. This results in the creation of cavities and voids, which can cause the ground to become unstable and cause a sinkhole to occur. The three primary mechanisms are the distribution of loads on the surface, groundwater variations, and chemical weathering. As a result of the dissolved carbon dioxide in the rainwater, the dolomite rock is dissolved during chemical weathering, which eventually leads to the growth of cracks and joints. The water table tends to shift in response to fluctuations in the groundwater, which expedites the dissolving process.

There are other important mechanisms that contribute to the formation of sinkholes and as such they should be avoided. They include but are not limited to, seismic events, water level drawdown (hydrology) and excessive amounts of seepage.

The dolomite rock can also undergo dissolution, whereby the interaction occurring between the rock and water leads to the breaking down of dolomite crystals, creating intergranular dissolved pores and intracrystalline micropores which ends up weakening the rock as the process occurs. Freeze-thaw cycles, which are a form of mechanical weathering, may also cause the dolomite to physically breakdown through the processes of expansion and contraction within the pores and fractures of the dolomite causing the rock to fail.

Dolomite can also be subjected to thermal stress which is as a result of temperature fluctuations which also cause the expansion and contraction to occur and ultimately leading to microcracking and dolomitic failure. The rocks are also susceptible to surface erosion and weathering processes which also ultimately weakens the rock.

== Types of dolomitic failure and potential damages ==
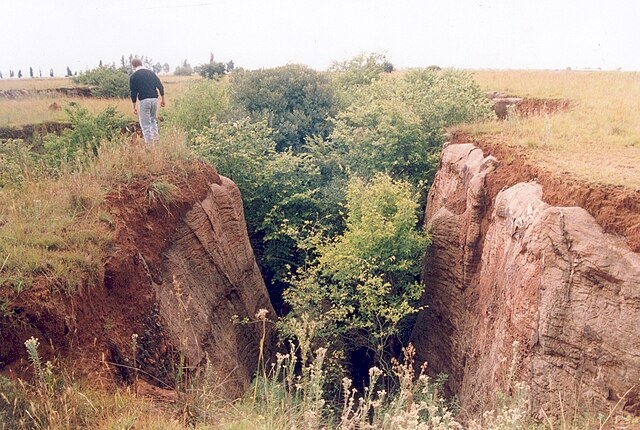
A 1980s sinkhole in Carletonville due to dolomitic failure Sinkhole in gryke north of Carletonville, Gauteng Province

Dolomitic failures include sinkholes (dolines), which are described as a hole or depression in the ground or as a sudden collapse (structural) or sinking of the ground surface in underlying caverns, usually caused by the downward vertical movement of land. These sinkholes are the result of karst processes, which often happen in karst environments when soluble carbonate rocks dissolve.

Subsidence is the gradual sinking of the surface earth, which over time causes structural damage. One of the numerous possible causes of sinking is the breakdown of carbonate rocks. This breakdown is gradual and causes tremendous damage to infrastructures and can also lead to major fatalities.

Pipeline collapse in regions where dolomitic strata is present is one of the many possible failures in dolomitic land. Differential settling in the pipelines can occur as a result of soil movement and external loads placed on or near the pipelines. If the pipelines leak and water flows out this might lead to failure as that water will react with the carbonate rock causing additional cavities to form and grow. Because of the increased shear stress of the strain on the pipelines, any type of loading-whether from structures or from the soil on top of the pipelines after the depression has formed will cause more failure and cause the sinkhole to grow. Any sort of loading by structures or by soil on top of the pipes after the depression has developed will lead to greater failure and result in the depression growing as well, this will be due to the increasing shear stress on the weight on the pipelines. Another kind of failure that occurs in dolomitic land is construction failure, which results in several fatalities and structural damages. Such incidents are common in many vulnerable areas of South Africa, particularly in Stilfontein and Highveld Centurion.

== Areas prone to dolomitic failure in South Africa ==
Dolomitic sinkholes are common in the Gauteng Province, especially in areas such as Centurion, South Africa and the West Rand. Dolomitic land makes up around 25% of Gauteng, and the region is home to about 4 million people. The bedrock pinnacles and troughs at Centurion's karstic strata covered in chert and gravels and other dissolution products.

== See also ==
- Diagenesis
- Geology of South Africa
- Sinkholes
- Subsidence
