= Maphalaleni =

Coordinates: 26.200991°S 31.367920°E

Maphalaleni is a constituency (Inkhundla) situated in the Highveld region of Eswatini, within the Hhohho region. It is located near the country's administrative capital, Mbabane.

== Geography ==
The main river in Maphalaleni is the Umkhomati River, which flows into the Maguga Dam, a significant water reservoir in Eswatini. The constituency comprises six chiefdoms: Endlozini, Emfeni, Emcengeni, Ensingweni, Madlolo, and Maphalaleni.

== Governance ==
Maphalaleni is represented in the Eswatini Parliament by Honourable Minister Mabulala Maseko, who is currently serving his third term as a Member of Parliament and his second term as the Minister of Public Works. Maseko hails from the Lubhujini community within the constituency.

Maphalaleni Chiefdom

It is under the reign of chief Mashila Dlamini.

The local governance structure includes:

- Chairman (Indvuna yeNkhundla): Maphevu Dlamini, under the Maphalaleni chiefdom.

- Constituency Councillor: Lusekwane Ndwandwe also from the Maphalaleni chiefdom (umphakatsi).

== Education ==
Education in Maphalaleni has seen significant improvements with the establishment of new schools, reducing the challenges of long-distance travel for students. Notable schools include:

- Emabheleni Primary School in the Bulimeni community.

- Emphumelelweni High School

- Luvinjelweni Secondary School.

Previously, Maphalaleni Secondary School was the only high school in the area; it has since been upgraded to Maphalaleni High School.

== Health and sanitation ==
A new clinic was built to enhance access to healthcare services for residents, reducing the need for long-distance travel.

Clean water and sanitation projects have been implemented to benefit various communities, including Ebulimeni, Lubhujini, Busheleletini, and Mtjopane. Schools and other facilities, such as Ekuvinjelweni High School and Maphalaleni High School, also benefit from these projects. These initiatives have significantly reduced waterborne diseases in the area.

The constituency has community health workers (bagcugcuteli) Maphalaleniis a constituency (Inkhundla) situated in the Highveld region of Eswatini, within the Hhohho District. It is located near the country's administrative capital, Mbabane.
