= Timpisini =

Coordinates: 25°46′37″S 31°26′06″E

Timpisini is an inkhundla of Eswatini, located in the Hhohho District. Its population as of the 2007 census was 8,471.
