= Girolamo Maria Casalini =

Italian catholic bishop

Girolamo Maria Casalini OSM
- Bishop of Manzini
- Church: Catholic Church
- Diocese: Diocese of Manzini
- In office: 18 December 1965 – 24 January 1976
- Predecessor: Costantino Maria Attilio Barneschi
- Successor: Aloysius Isaac Mandlenkhosi Zwane

Orders
- Ordination: 19 June 1938
- Consecration: 12 February 1966 by Ermenegildo Florit

Personal details
- Born: 17 December 1915 Siena, Province of Siena, Kingdom of Italy
- Died: 28 August 1982 (aged 66)

Girolamo Maria Casalini (born 17 Dec 1915 in Siena) was an Italian clergyman and bishop for the Roman Catholic Diocese of Manzini. He was ordained in 1938. He was appointed in 1965. He died in 1982.
