= Ludzeludze =

Coordinates: 26.397079°S 31.314091°E

Ludzeludze is an inkhundla of Eswatini, located in the Manzini District. Its population as of the 2007 census was 28,355.
