= Romualdo Migliorini =

Italian catholic bishop

Romualdo Migliorini O.S.M.
- Prefect of Swaziland
- Church: Catholic Church
- Diocese: Apostolic Prefecture of Swaziland
- In office: 8 July 1933 – 1939
- Predecessor: Pellegrino Bellezze
- Successor: Costantino Maria Attilio Barneschi

Orders
- Ordination: 13 June 1908

Personal details
- Born: 21 June 1884 Volegno, Province of Lucca, Kingdom of Italy
- Died: 10 July 1953 (aged 69) Carsoli, Abruzzo, Italy

Romualdo Migliorini, O.S.M. (b. Volegno, Lucca, Italy; 21 June 1884 – 10 July 1953) was an Italian clergyman and bishop for the Roman Catholic Diocese of Manzini. He was ordained in 1901. He was appointed in 1933. He died in 1953.
