= Ndzingeni =

Coordinates: 25.9736°S 31.2940°E

Ndzingeni is an inkhundla of Eswatini, located in the Hhohho District. Its population as of the 2007 census was 19,115.
