= Ntondozi =

Inkhundla in Manzini District, Eswatini

Coordinates: 26°38′06″S 31°13′32″E

Ntondozi is an inkhundla of Eswatini, located in the Manzini District. Its population as of the 2007 census was 14,768.
