= Phophonyane Falls Nature Reserve =

Nature reserve in Eswatini

Coordinates: 25.95°S 31.27°E

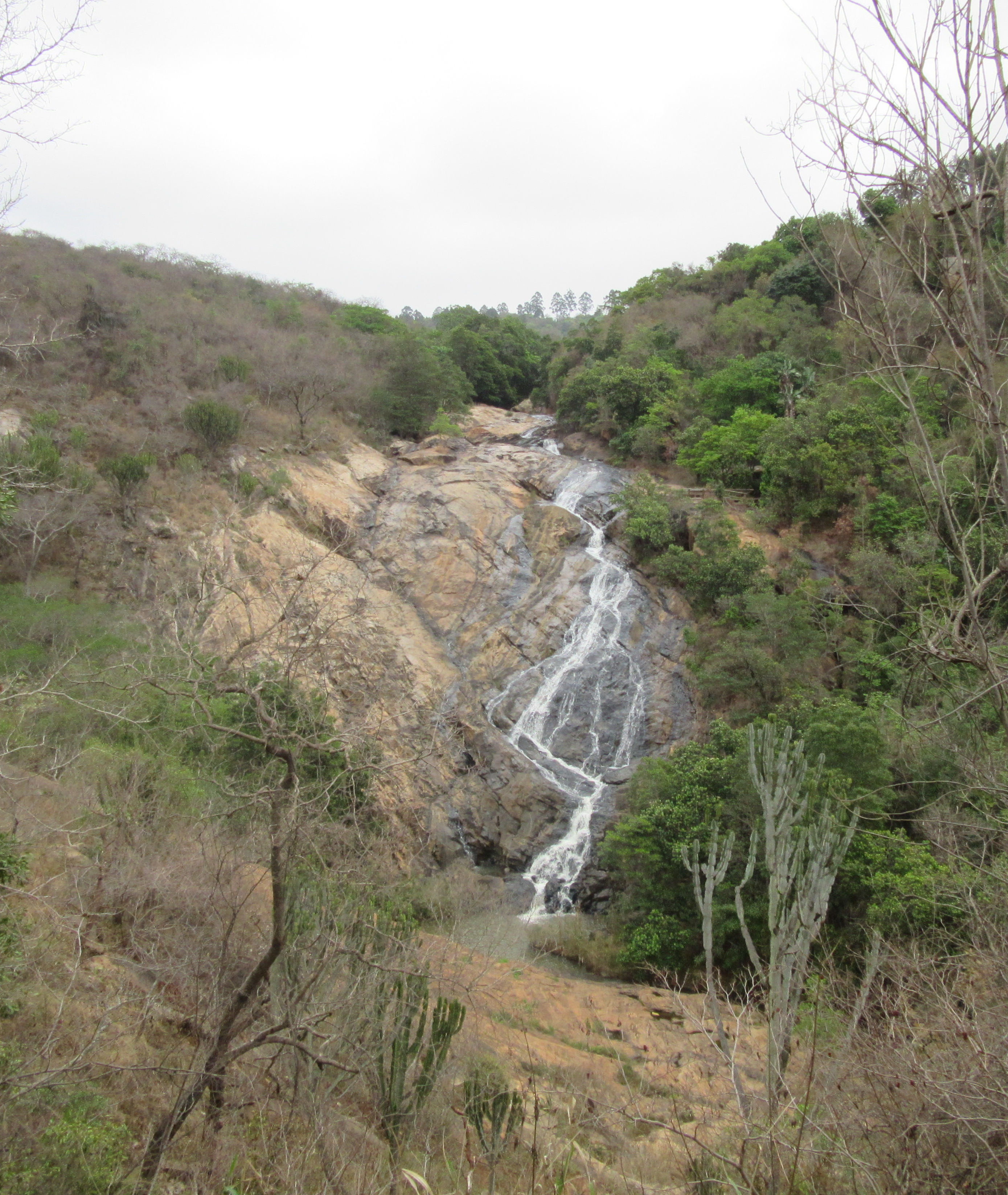
Phophonyane Falls

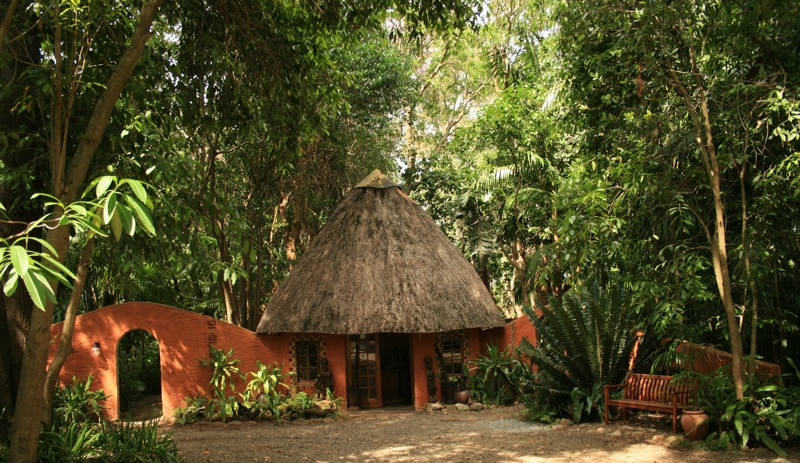
Lodge reception

The Phophonyane Falls Nature Reserve is a scenic, 600 ha large nature reserve and tourist destination near Piggs Peak, Eswatini.

A network of footpaths through the Gobolondlo forest reaches meandering watercourses which lead to the main attraction of the reserve - the 80 m high Phophonyane Falls. This waterfall has formed on a steep section of exposed gneiss. The Phophonyane River in this area falls per some 240 m over the distance of 2 km.

Some of the oldest rocks in the world, dated at 3.55 billion years, are exposed at the waterfall.
