= Mpisi =

Coordinates: 26.380°S 31.530°E

Mpisi is a town in central Eswatini. It is located on the MR5 route to the northeast of Manzini, between the towns of Mafutseni and Luve.
