= Polinjane River =

River in Eswatini

The Polinjane River is a river of Eswatini. A tributary of the Mbabane River, it flows through the Mdzimba Mountains. Hydroelectric projects are reportedly active on the river.
