= William Pigg =

French gold prospector

- Born: 1832; London
- Died: 1902 (aged 69–70); Umzinto, Natal
- Occupations: gold prospector, explorer, farmer
- Children: 6
- Father: Anthony Pigg

William Pigg (1831–1902) was a British gold prospector, explorer, and farmer who was involved in gold mining operations in southeast Africa during the 19th century. He was the founder and namesake of Piggs Peak, where he discovered a gold reef in 1884.

== Life and career ==
In the early 1860s, Pigg discovered traces of gold in the Umzinto River. Pigg married in 1862 and lived with his wife on his estate in the area, where he farmed sugar. In late 1871, Pigg went north with his family and made two exploratory journeys, the second of which made it north of the Limpopo River and into modern-day Zimbabwe.

Pigg played an important role in mining operations at Eersteling gold mine in the 1870s. He mined the upper part of a weathered quartz reef there while his partner, Edward Button, was in England. He employed local laborers for quartz crushing, but the laborers could only crush 50 to 70 kilograms of quartz per hour. He developed a quartz crushing method in which two laborers would sit on opposite ends of a tree branch and rock a 500-kilogram boulder back and forth while quartz was fed underneath it. This boulder remains preserved today and can be viewed at the Ditsong National Museum of Natural History.

Pigg was the founder of Piggs Peak. Pigg amassed significant wealth after he discovered a gold deposit in the nearby hills on 26 March 1884. The discovery led to the establishment of the Piggs Peak gold mine, which became the largest source of gold in Swazi history.

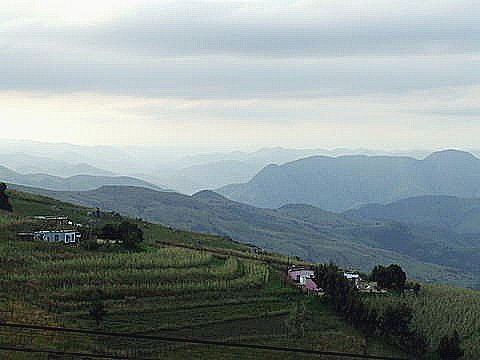
Piggs Peak
