= Carolina, South Africa =

Carolina
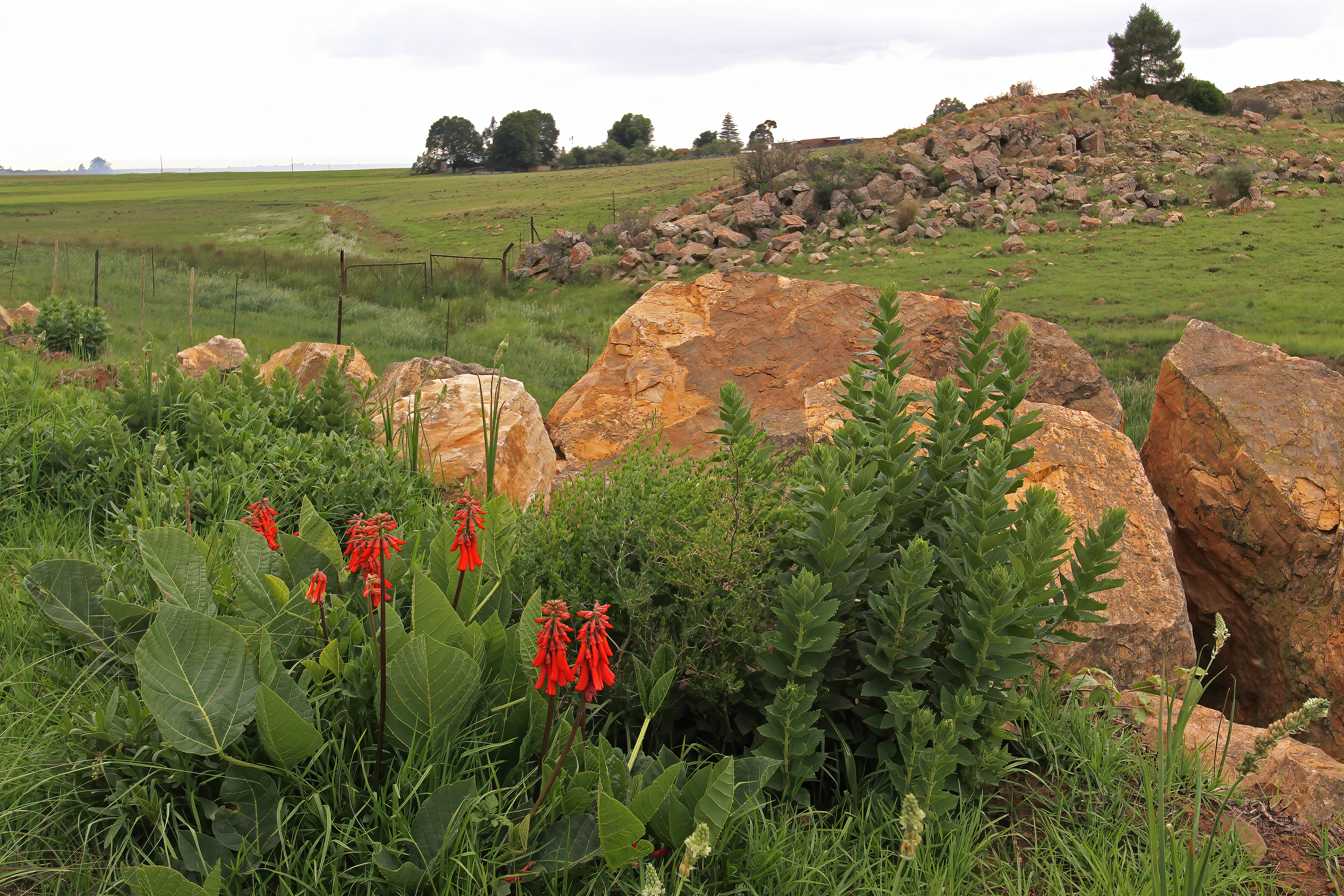
- A farm near Carolina

- Location within Mpumalanga Location within South Africa
- Coordinates: 26.067°S 30.117°E
- Country: South Africa
- Province: Mpumalanga
- District: Gert Sibande
- Municipality: Albert Luthuli

Area
  - Total: 14.66 km^{2} (5.66 sq mi)
- Elevation: 1,700 m (5,600 ft)

Population (2011)
  - Total: 16,846
  - Density: 1,149/km^{2} (2,976/sq mi)

Racial makeup (2011)
  - Black African: 86.8%
  - Coloured: 0.6%
  - Indian/Asian: 2.0%
  - White: 10.4%
  - Other: 0.1%

First languages (2011)
  - Zulu: 50.6%
  - Swazi: 25.8%
  - Afrikaans: 10.6%
  - English: 4.2%
  - Other: 8.8%
- Time zone: UTC+2 (SAST)
- Postal code (street): 1185
- PO box: 1185
- Area code: 017

Carolina is an urban-rural area situated at the intersection of the R33, R36 and R38 routes in the Mpumalanga province of South Africa. The town lies in the grass and wetlands region of Mpumalanga at 1700 meters above sea level. It is a mixed farming and small-scale coal- and precious-stone-mining community.

== History ==
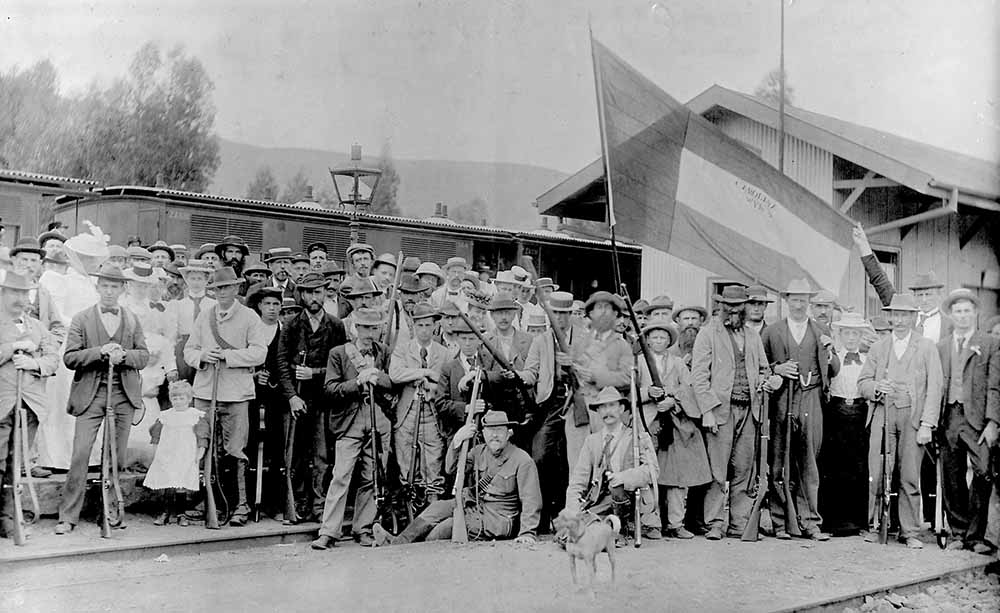
The Carolina Commando, established in 1895, with a flag.

Carolina was established by Cornelius Johannes Coetzee as a permanent outspan for wagons when gold was discovered in 1883 in Barberton. The town of Carolina was proclaimed on 15 June 1886 and named after his wife Magdalena Carolina Smit. The town was built on portions of the farms Groenvlei and Goedehoop and the first stands were sold in 1883.

Carolina was rebuilt after it was razed in 1900 during the Second Boer War. A few examples of sandstone architecture are still to be found among Carolina's public buildings. The sandstone Grobler Bridge which crosses the Komati River on the present R36 route to Machadodorp was opened for traffic in 1897. It was named after Johannes Lodewikus Grobler. The cornerstone of the Dutch Reformed Church was laid by Commandant General Piet Joubert in October 1888. This building was severely damaged during the Second Boer War and used as a horse stable by British troops. The Ermelo Railway Company completed the Ermelo–Carolina–Machadodorp railway line in 1907. This placed Carolina on the trade route with Swaziland (now Eswatini). The Komati River and associated Komati Gorge are situated in the vicinity of Carolina.

The large township of Silobela, with its various sections, is situated nearby. Silobela is populated by mostly Swati-speaking people, though there are also Zulus, Ndebeles and a small number of Tsonga people.

== See also ==
- Dolomite rock failure in South Africa
