= Hhohho Region =

Hhohho Region kaHhohho
- Map of Eswatini showing Hhohho region
- Coordinates: 26°00′S 31°30′E
- Country: Eswatini
- Established: 1903
- Regional Capital: Mbabane

Government
  - Regional Administrator: HRH Princess Tsandzile
  - Regional Secretary: Mr Sibusiso C. Dlamini

Area
  - Total: 3,625.17 km^{2} (1,399.69 sq mi)

Population (2017 census)
  - Total: 320,651
  - Density: 88.4513/km^{2} (229.088/sq mi)
- Time zone: UTC+2
- Postal code: H100
- HDI (2017): 0.644 medium

Hhohho is a region of Eswatini, located in the north western part of the country. Hhohho was named after the capital of King Mswati II, who expanded the Swazi territory to the north and west, taking in the districts of Barberton, Nelspruit, Carolina, and Piet Retief. These areas were later acquired by what was the Province of Transvaal and today they form part of the Mpumalanga Province of South Africa. It has an area of 3,625.17 km^{2} (1,399.69 sq mi), a population of 320,651 (2017), and is divided into 14 tinkhundla. The administrative center is the national capital of Mbabane. It borders Lubombo Region on the southeast and Manzini Region in the southwest.

== Etymology ==
The name Hhohho was the name of the royal capital of Mswati II, a 19th-century king of Eswatini. After the Anglo-Boer war, Eswatini came under British administration. A partition of the country into districts followed and Hhohho was the name chosen for the northernmost district.

== History ==
The region of Eswatini which is today Hhohho was inhabited in earlier times by the Khoisan people. Later, Bantu settlers of Nguni and Sotho origin established settlements in the area. The land was later conquered by King Sobhuza I in the early 19th century as he relocated his capital from Zombodze in present-day Shiselweni, to Zombodze in the centre of Eswatini. Sotho clans such as the Gama, Mnisi and Magagula, and Nguni clans such as the Maseko, were incorporated into the Swazi state. The royal capital of Sobhuza was built in what forms the Ezulwini valley (valley of heaven). This land was chosen for its impenetrability by invaders, and for its fertility, and good rivers.

Under the rule of King Mswati II, the royal capital of the king was constructed north of the country and was called Hhohho. This is the eponym of the Hhohho region. This briefly shifted the political centre of Eswatini northwards, first to minimise the danger of invasion by Zulu forces from the south, and later to expand and conquer lands in the north. Indeed, Mswati's armies expanded the territory of Eswatini. More royal outposts were constructed in towns that are now in South Africa's Mpumalanga province. The loss of the territory occurred after Mswati's reign had ended, and was spurred by the concession hunters, and settlers in the territory that became the Transvaal Republic.

During Eswatini's status as a British protectorate (1903–68), the borders of Hhohho were officially drawn, with its capital – and that of the country – being Mbabane. The British resident commissioner had his offices in the town. The city, the meaning of whose name is believed to originate from a “small and bitter highveld plant” that grew in the area, is named after Chief Mbabane Kunene.

== Industry ==
In the northwest of Eswatini, gold was discovered, drawing a large number of miners and settlers in the area. Gold deposits were first recorded around Piggs Peak mine during modern times in 1872 and in 1884 a gold-bearing reef was discovered in the hills to the west by the prospector, William Pigg, after whom the town is named. Pigg's Peak represents one of the largest iron ore reserves in Eswatini and in the world having estimated reserves of 700 million tonnes of ore grading 35 percent iron metal. Other mining activity took place in the neighbouring town of Bulembu, where later on, asbestos was mined. The town of Ngwenya on the western border of Eswatini with South Africa, is home to the oldest known iron-ore mine in the world. Commercial scale mining took place in the mine until 1977.

== Law and government ==
The Hhohho region is governed by the regional administrator, who is appointed by the king. The present regional administrator is HRH Princess Tsandzile. The seat of the regional administration is in the regional capital, Mbabane. Mbabane is also the administrative capital of Eswatini.

The legal system in Hhohho follows that of the whole country. There are magistrate courts which administer Roman-Dutch law.

== Administrative divisions ==
Hhohho is subdivided to 14 tinkhundla (or constituencies). These are local administration centres, and also parliamentary constituencies. Each inkhundla is headed by an indvuna yenkhundla or governor with the help of bucopho. The tinkhundla are further divided into imiphakatsi (or chiefdoms). The present tinkhundla are:

Inkhundla	Imiphakatsi
Hhukwini	Dlangeni, Lamgabhi
Lobamba	Elangeni, Ezabeni, Ezulwini, Lobamba, Nkanini
Madlangempisi	Ebulanzeni/Buhlebuyeza, Emzaceni, Kadvokolwako, Kaguquka, Kazandondo
Maphalaleni	Emcengeni, Emfeni, Entsanjeni, Esitseni, Kasiko, Mabeleni, Madlolo, Maphalaleni, Nsingweni
Mayiwane	Emfasini, Herefords, Mavula, Mkhuzweni, Mkhweni
Mbabane East	Corporation, Fonteyn, Gobholo, Maqobolwane, Mcozini, Mncitsini, Mntulwini, Sidwashini
Mhlangatane	Mangweni, Manjengeni, Mavula, Malibeni, Mpofu, Ndvwabangeni, Nhlanguyavuka, Nyakatfo, Sidwashini, Zinyane
Motjane	Ekupheleni, Esigangeni, Luhlendlweni, Mantabeni, Motjane, Mpolonjeni, Sipocosini
Ndzingeni	Bulandzeni, Emgungunlovu, Emvuma, Ludlawini, Ndzingeni, Ngowane, Nkamanzi
Nkhaba	Ejubukweni, Ekuvinjelweni, Emdzimba, Nkaba
Ntfonjeni	Hhelehhele, Kandwandwe, Lomshiyo, Mashobeni, Mshingishingini, Mvembili, Vusweni
Piggs Peak	Bulembu, Ekwakheni, Enginamadolo, Ensangwini, Kamkhweli, Luhhumaneni
Timpisini	Kahhohho, Mashobeni, Mvembili, Ndlalambi/Ludzibini

== Economy ==
Hhohho is the most economically advanced region of Eswatini. Being home to the capital of the country, and hosting a significant fraction of the Manzini-Mbabane corridor, it has Eswatini's biggest urbanized population. The economy of the region is dominated by services, tourism, and forestry. The capital, Mbabane, is home to the headquarters of many of Eswatini's corporations. The central bank of Eswatini is located in Mbabane, as are the headquarters of Standard Bank, Nedbank, Swazi Bank, First National Bank and Eswatini Building Society. The other financial service organisations located in Mbabane include African Alliance, Select Management Services, and the Eswatini Revenue Authority, among many others.

The forestry industry is one of the most important sectors of the Hhohho economy. The area around the towns of Piggs Peak and Bulembu is home to many planted forests and sawmills. The wood is exported for processing in South Africa. The remaining agricultural sector remains very small. Most rural dwellers continue to cultivate rain-fed crops on Swazi Nation Land, and keep small amounts of livestock.

Mining in Hhohho declined significantly during the 20th century and the beginning of the 21st. Mining in the early 19th century was the dominant industry with mines located in Ngwenya, Bulembu, Piggs Peak and other areas. Ngwenya mine is notable for its status as the oldest known iron ore mine in the world. Some mining activity still continues in this mine under the Indian mining company Salgaocar. The other mines in the region are no longer operational. The Bulembu mining town which was the main centre for asbestos mining has now diversified into other sectors, and is privately owned.

Tourism is one of the largest sectors of the Hhohho economy. The Ezulwini valley is Eswatini's most famous tourist area with many hotels and restaurants. In Lobamba, the royal and legislative capital of Eswatini, various tourist attractions exist. These include the National Museum, the King Sobhuza II Memorial, and the Eswatini National Archives. The umhlanga festival, held at Ludzidzini Royal Kraal, is one of the most famous cultural events in Eswatini. Mantenga Falls and cultural village, also in the Zulwini valley, are magnets for Swazi cultural tourists. Further north of the region lies the Maguga dam and lodge, and further north is the Phophonyane Falls. Hhohho is also home to the Malolotja nature reserve, a place renowned for its hiking trails.

== Cultural ==
Hhohho is home to the royal capital of Eswatini at Lobamba. Here the main cultural events of the country are held. These are the Incwala ceremony and the Umhlanga ceremony.

Hhohho is also home to art galleries such as the Indingilizi Gallery in Mbabane. Performance arts can be seen at the theater club, also in Mbabane.

=== Education ===
A campus of the national University of Eswatini is located in Mbabane, and specializes in health and environmental sciences. The Eswatini College of Technology (SCOT), is also located in Mbabane, and focuses on various technical trades. Recent tertiary institutions in the region are the Eswatini Christian University and a campus of Limkokwing University.
