= Komati River =

Komati River Komatirivier, Incomati River, Inkomati River
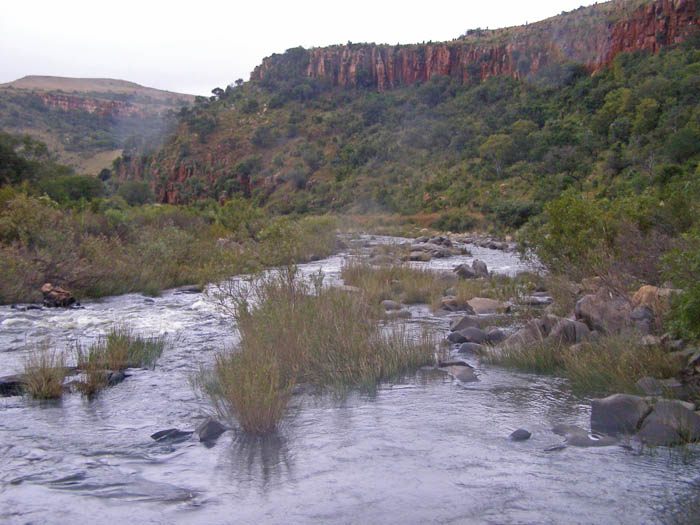
- The gorge near Carolina in the upper Komati River
- Etymology: From the Swazi language word for "cow", meaning hippos

Location
- Countries: South Africa; Eswatini; Mozambique

Physical characteristics
- Source
  - location: Near Ermelo, Mpumalanga
  - elevation: 1,800 m (5,900 ft)
- Mouth: Indian Ocean
  - location: Maputo Bay
  - coordinates: 25°48′57.46″S 32°43′38.89″E
- Length: 480 km (300 mi)
- Basin size: 50,000 km^{2} (19,000 sq mi)
- Discharge
  - average: 111 m^{3}/s (3,900 cu ft/s)

The Komati River, also known as the Inkomati River or Incomati River (in Mozambique, from Portuguese Rio Incomati), is a river in South Africa, Eswatini and Mozambique. Originating in north-western Eswatini, it is joined by the Crocodile River in the Lebombo Mountains, enters far south-western Mozambique below the border town of Komatipoort, and enters the Indian Ocean around 24 km (15 mi) north-east of Maputo.

It is 480 kilometres (298 mi) long, with a drainage basin 50,000 square kilometres (19,300 sq mi) in size. Its mean annual discharge is 111 m^{3}/s (3,920 cfs) at its mouth.

The name Komati is derived from inkomati, meaning "cow" in siSwati, as its perennial nature is compared to a cow that always has milk.

== Geography ==
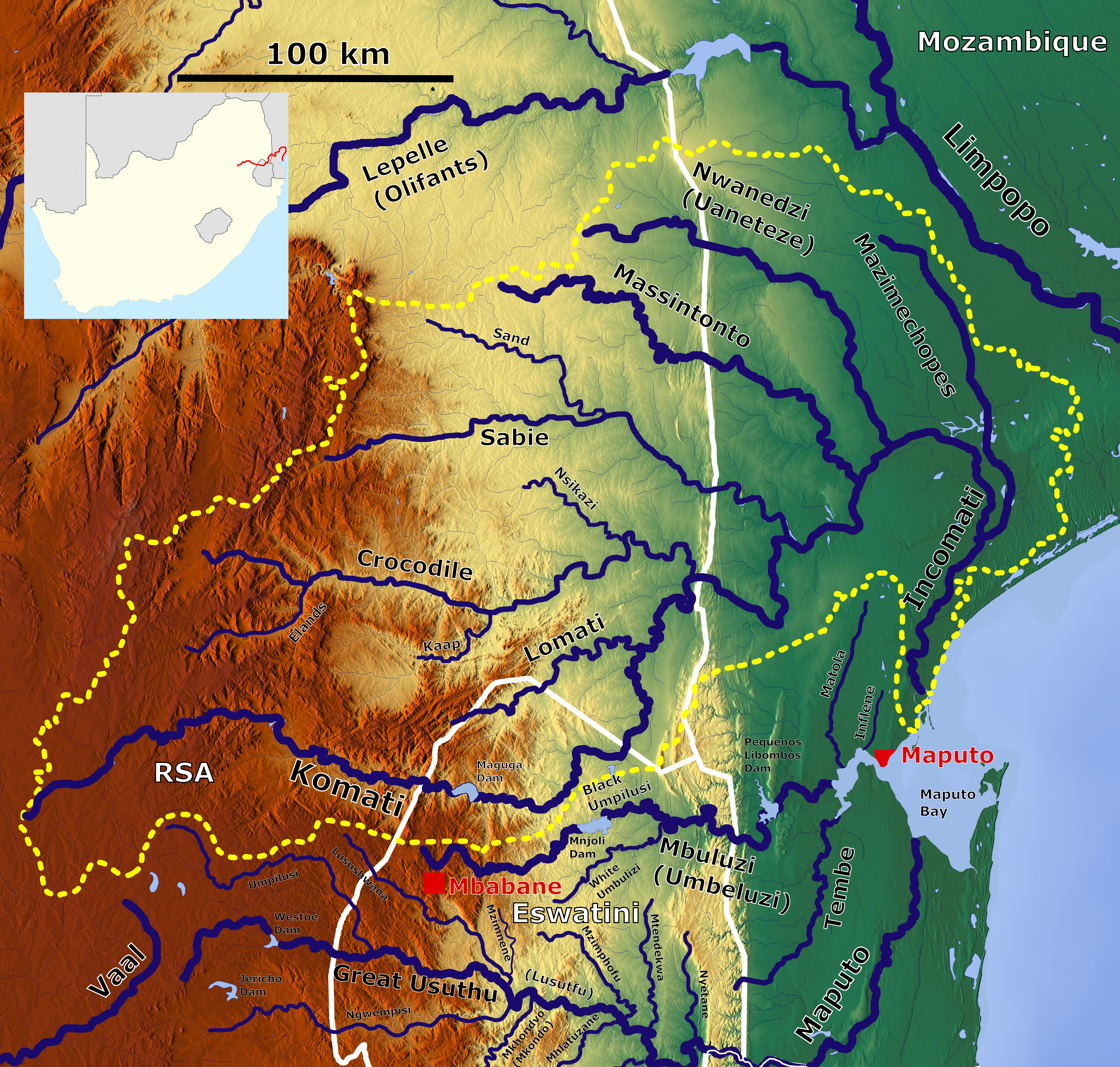
Location of the Komati River and its tributaries with the respective country border

The river originates west of Carolina, rising at an elevation of about 1,800 m (5,906 ft) near Breyten in the Ermelo district of the Mpumalanga province. It flows in a general northeasterly direction and reaches the Indian Ocean at Maputo Bay, after a course of some 800 km (497 mi).

The Komati Gorge is situated in the upper reaches of the Komati River and is the habitat of some endangered species such as the southern bald ibis. In 2001 the 115 m high wall of the Maguga Dam was completed south of Piggs Peak, Eswatini, 26°4′51.57″S 31°15′25.84″E

In its upper valley near Steynsdorp are goldfields, but the reefs consist almost entirely of low grade ore. The river descends the Drakensberg by a pass 48 km (30 mi) south of Barberton, and is deflected northward at the eastern border of Eswatini, keeping a course parallel to the Lebombo mountains. Just west of 32° E and 25° 25′ S, near the town of Komatipoort, it is joined by the Crocodile River. The Crocodile tributary rises, as the Elands River, in the Bergendal (1,961 m) near the upper waters of the Komati, and flows eastwards across the highveld, being turned northward as it reaches the Drakensberg escarpment. The fall to the lowveld is over 600 metres in 48 km (30 mi), and across the 161 km (100 mi) wide country between the Drakensberg and the Lebombo there is a further fall of 900 metres.

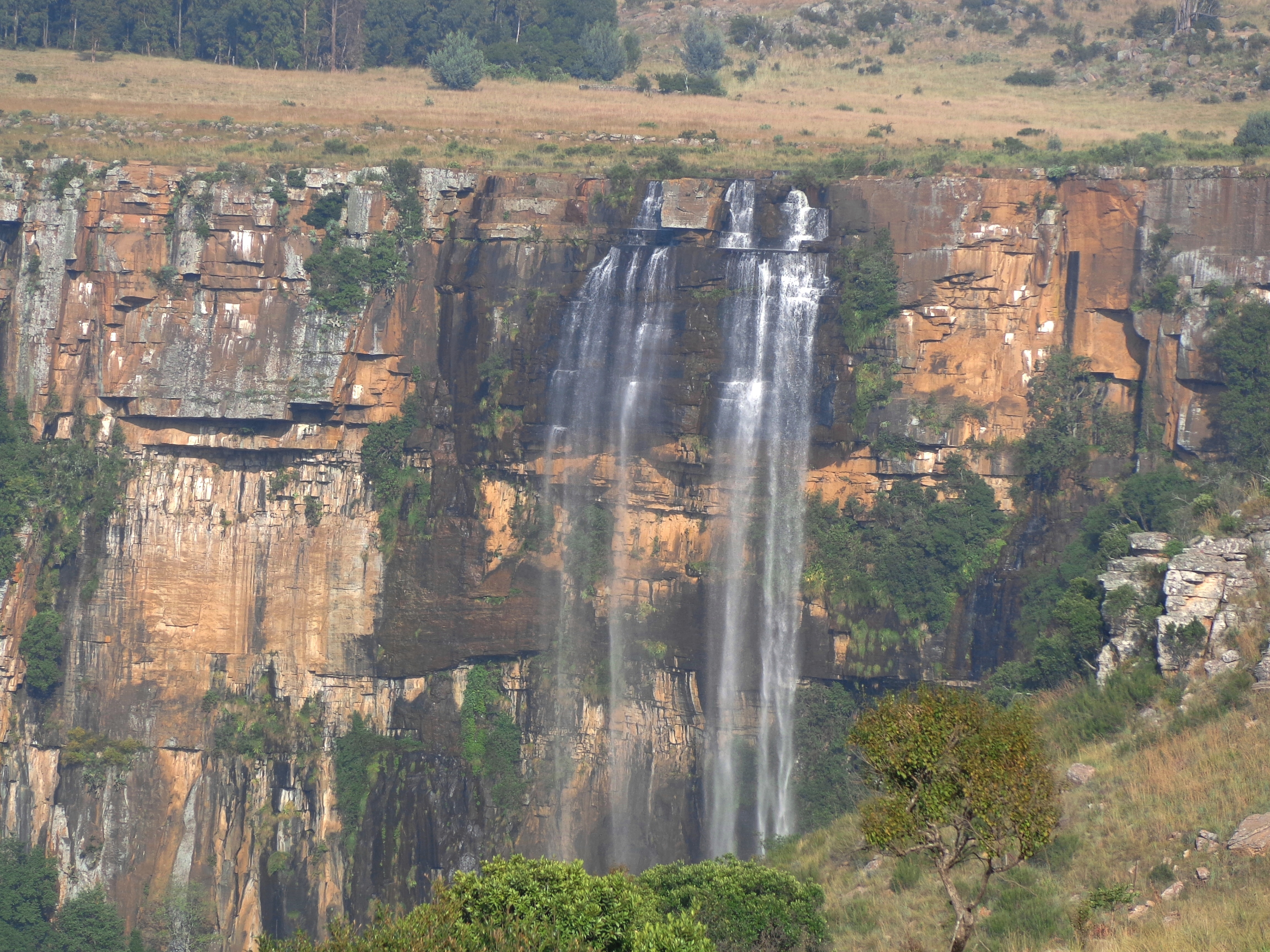
The Uitkoms Waterfall in the Bank Spruit, a tributary in the upper reaches of the Komati, Mpumalanga

Just over a kilometre below the junction of the Crocodile, the united stream, which from this point is also known as the Manhissa, passes to the coastal plain through a 190 m high cleft, high in the Lebombo known as Komatipoort, featuring some picturesque falls. At Komatipoort, which marks the border between South Africa and Mozambique, the river is less than 100 km (60 mi) from its mouth in a direct line, but in crossing the plain it makes a wide sweep of 322 km (200 mi), first northwards before turning southwards, forming lagoon-like expanses and backwaters and receiving from the north several tributaries. In flood time there is a connection northward through the swamps with the basin of the Limpopo. The Komati enters the sea 24 km (15 mi) north of Maputo. It is navigable from its mouth, where the water is up to 5m deep, to the foot of the Lebombo.

== History ==
The Portuguese named the river's lower reaches the Rio des Reijs, either "river of rice" or "river of kings". Subsequently, Jan van Riebeeck's journal mentions a Rio de Reijs, when he dispatched a ship up the east coast in search of rice supplies. In voortrekker Louis Tregardt's journal it is referred to as the Manhissa, a name still extant, while to the British it was known as the King George River.

In 1725 a Dutch expedition led by Francois de Kuiper explored the region of the lower Komati and travelled 30 km into the current Mpumalanga province, before they were attacked by local tribes and had to return to Delagoa Bay.

On the September 23, 1900 during the Second Boer War, 3,000 Boers crossed the frontier at the small town of Komatipoort, and surrendered to the Portuguese authorities.

On November 7, 1900, the banks of the Komati became the site of a battle between the British Empire and the Boers. The Battle of Leliefontein was a retreat by the British, harassed by the Boers, who were threatening to capture the British Artillery. The British guns were saved by the Royal Canadian Dragoons who charged the Boers, whereby they placed the guns out of their reach.

== Railway ==
The railway from Maputo to Pretoria traverses the plain in a direct line, and at seventy-two kilometres, reaches the Komati. It follows the south bank of the river and enters the high country at Komati Poort. From the Poort westward the railway skirts the south bank of the Crocodile River throughout its length. This railway was originally constructed by the Netherlands-South African Railway Company (NZASM) and was officially inaugurated in 1895.

== See also ==
- Komatiite
- Komatipoort
- List of rivers of South Africa
