= Motjane =

Town in Eswatini

Coordinates: 26.243°S 31.053°E

Motjane is a town in northwestern Eswatini. It is located on the MR1 route 15 kilometres to the northwest of Mbabane, on a junction with a route crossing into South Africa near the town of Ngwenya. It was reported by The Rudolph Aggregates to have a listed population of under 500 inhabitants
