= Piggs Peak =

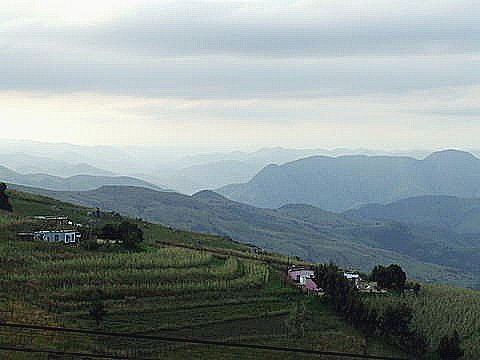

- Location within Eswatini
- Coordinates: 25°58′S 31°15′E
- Country: Eswatini
- District: Hhohho
- Climate: Cwb

Piggs Peak is a town in northwestern Eswatini. It was founded around gold prospecting in 1884, but its main industry is now forestry. The Phophonyane Falls lie near the town. Piggs Peak Casino takes its name from the area.

In 2001 the 115m high wall of the Maguga Dam was completed in the Komati River 12 km south of town at 25°56′51.41″S 30°4′52.74″E.

Piggs Peak is named after an early resident, William Pigg, who discovered a gold reef here on 26 March 1884.

== Sport ==
Malanti Chiefs F.C. play in Piggs Peak.
