= Madlangempisi =

Coordinates: 26°05′24″S 31°33′00″E

Madlangempisi is a Town in Africa, Eswatini, named after Magagula King Madlangemphisi (He who eats like a Hyena).

Madlangemphisi had a vast Jurisdiction stretching as far as modern day border Mananga, located in the Hhohho District.

The town's current chief is Mdvuba II.

The town has a business centre, Nazarene mission, correctional facilities and a wide range of farms. The Nkomati River flows through it.

A wide range of Skills are communally practiced including farming and pastoralism.

Madlangemphisi is the last town before Buhleni Town.

Its population per the 2007 census was 16,972.
