= Mafutseni =

Coordinates: 26.44°S 31.52°E

Mafutseni is a town in central Eswatini. It is located to the northeast of Manzini and Hhelehhele at the junction of the MR3 route to Mpaka and the MR5 route to Mpisi.
