= Indingilizi Gallery =

Coordinates: 26°19′14″S 31°8′40″E

Indingilizi Gallery is an art gallery in Mbabane, Eswatini, established in 1982. Most of Eswatini's top artists have had their work showcased here. The gallery showcases a range of Swazi art including sculptures, paintings, batiks, mohair, ethnic jewellery and pottery.
