= Diocese of Manzini =

Roman Catholic diocese in Eswatini

Coordinates: 26°29′S 31°22′E

Diocese of Manzini Dioecesis Manziniensis

Location
- Country: Eswatini
- Metropolitan: Johannesburg

Statistics
- Area: 17,364 km^{2} (6,704 sq mi)
- Population: Total; Catholics: (as of 2004); 990,000; 55,130 (5.6%)

Information
- Denomination: Catholic Church
- Sui iuris church: Latin Church
- Rite: Roman Rite

Current leadership
- Pope: Leo XIV
- Bishop: José Luís Gerardo Ponce de León, IMC

Website
- www.dioceseofmanzini.org

The Diocese of Manzini (Latin: Manzinien(sis)) is a Latin Church ecclesiastical territory or diocese of the Catholic Church in Eswatini. It is a suffragan diocese in the ecclesiastical province of the metropolitan Johannesburg in South Africa. Its episcopal see is located in the city of Manzini.

== History ==
- 19 April 1923: Established as Apostolic Prefecture of Swaziland from the Apostolic Vicariate of Natal in South Africa
- 15 March 1939: Promoted as Apostolic Vicariate of Swaziland
- 11 January 1951: Promoted as the Diocese of Bremersdorp
- 7 November 1961: Renamed as Diocese of Manzini

== Leadership ==
=== Prefects Apostolic of Swaziland ===
- Fr. Pellegrino Bellezze, OSM (15 March 1923 – 1932)
- Fr. Romualdo Migliorini, OSM (8 July 1933 – 1939)

=== Vicar Apostolic of Swaziland ===
- Costantino Maria Attilio Barneschi, OSM (15 March 1939 – 11 January 1951 see below)

=== Bishop of Bremersdorp ===
- Costantino Maria Attilio Barneschi, OSM (see above 11 January 1951 – 7 November 1961 see below)

=== Bishops of Manzini ===
- Costantino Maria Attilio Barneschi, OSM (see above 7 November 1961 – 21 May 1965)
- Girolamo Maria Casalini, OSM (18 December 1965 – 24 January 1976)
- Aloysius Isaac Mandlenkhosi Zwane (24 January 1976 – 10 August 1980)
- Louis Ncamiso Ndlovu, OSM (1 July 1985 – 27 August 2012)
- José Luís Gerardo Ponce de León, IMC (29 November 2013 – present)

== See also ==
- Catholic Church in South Africa
- Catholic Church in Eswatini
