= Mbabane =

Executive capital city of Eswatini

- Capital city (executive branch)
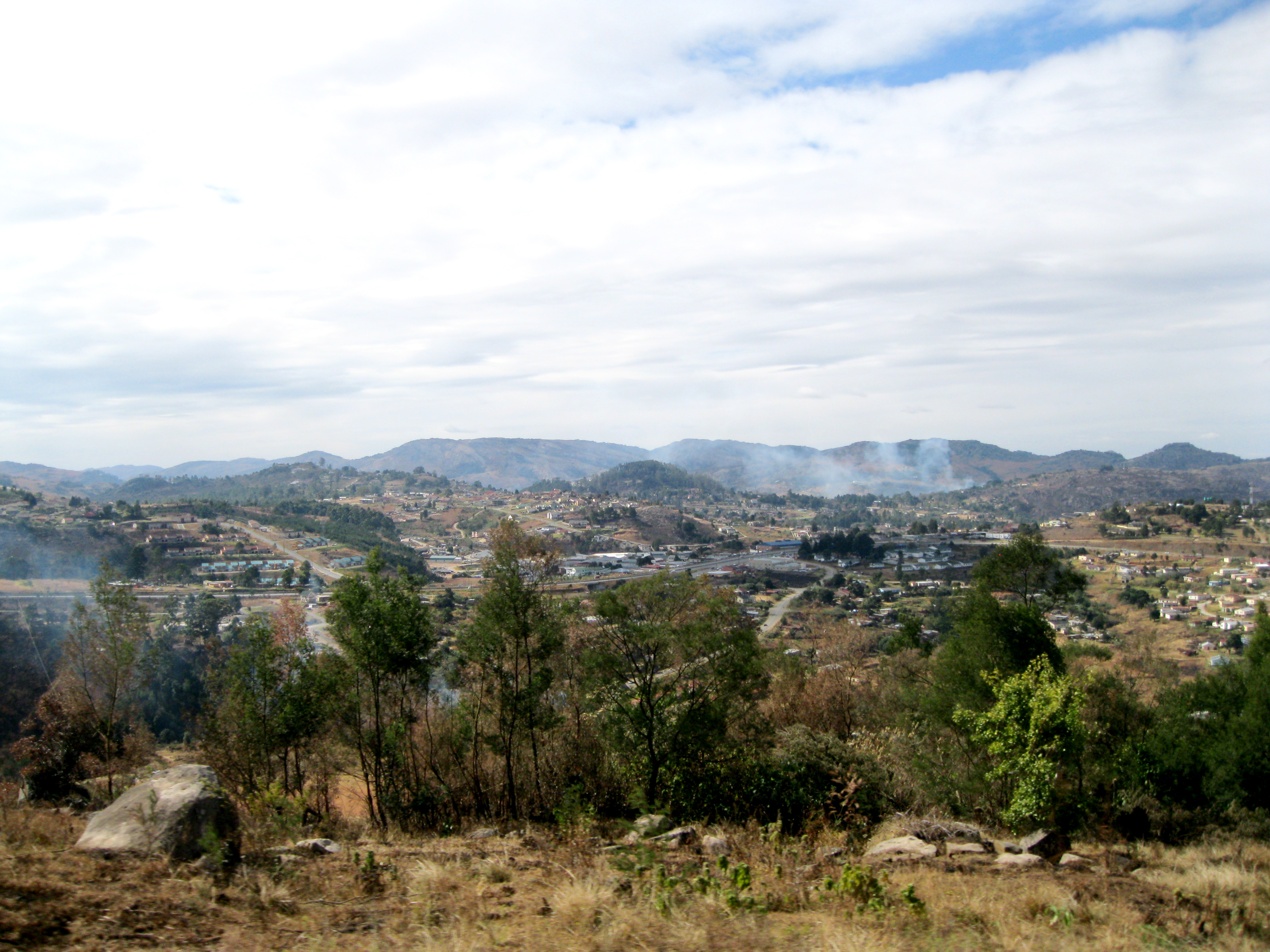
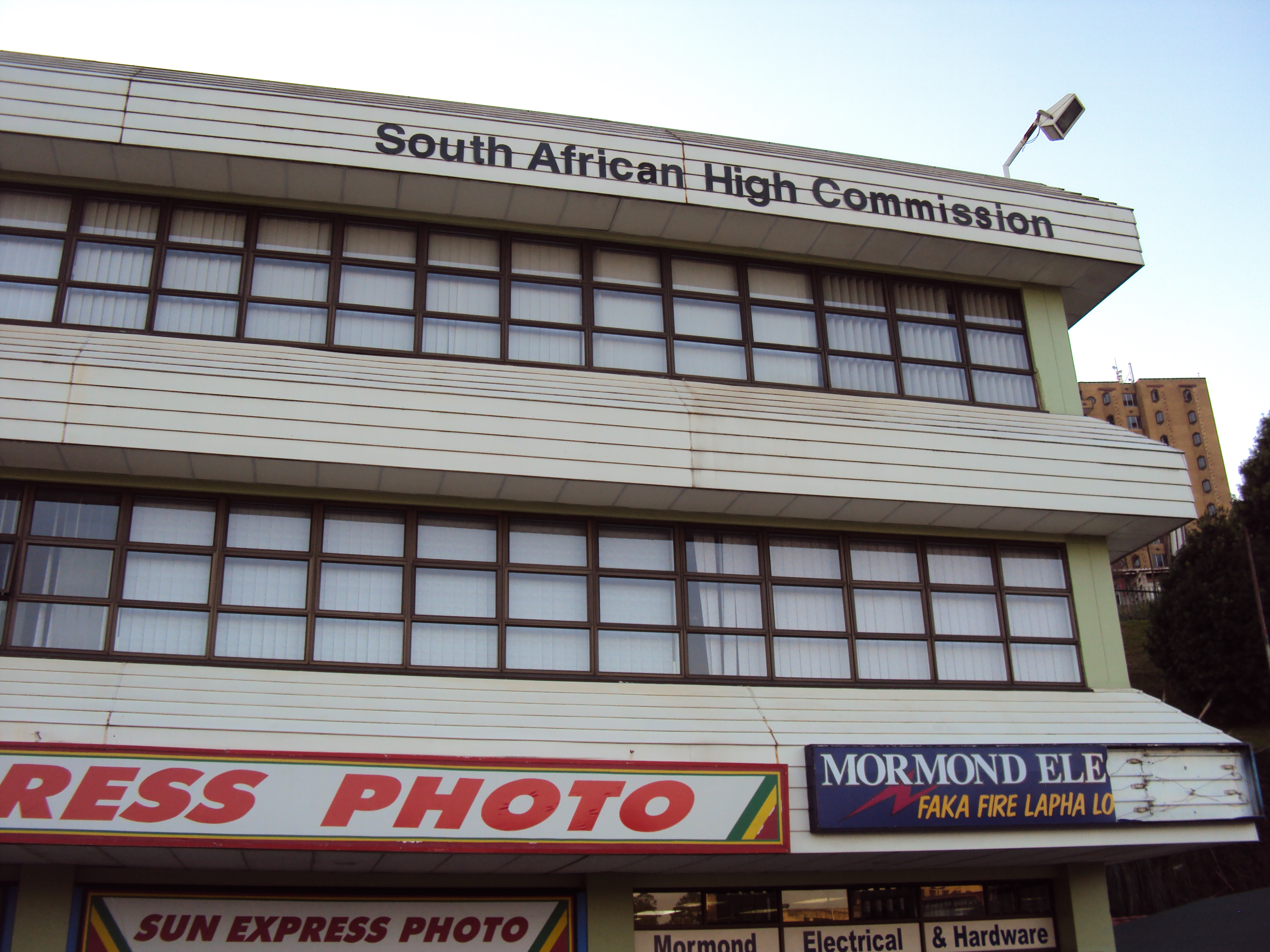
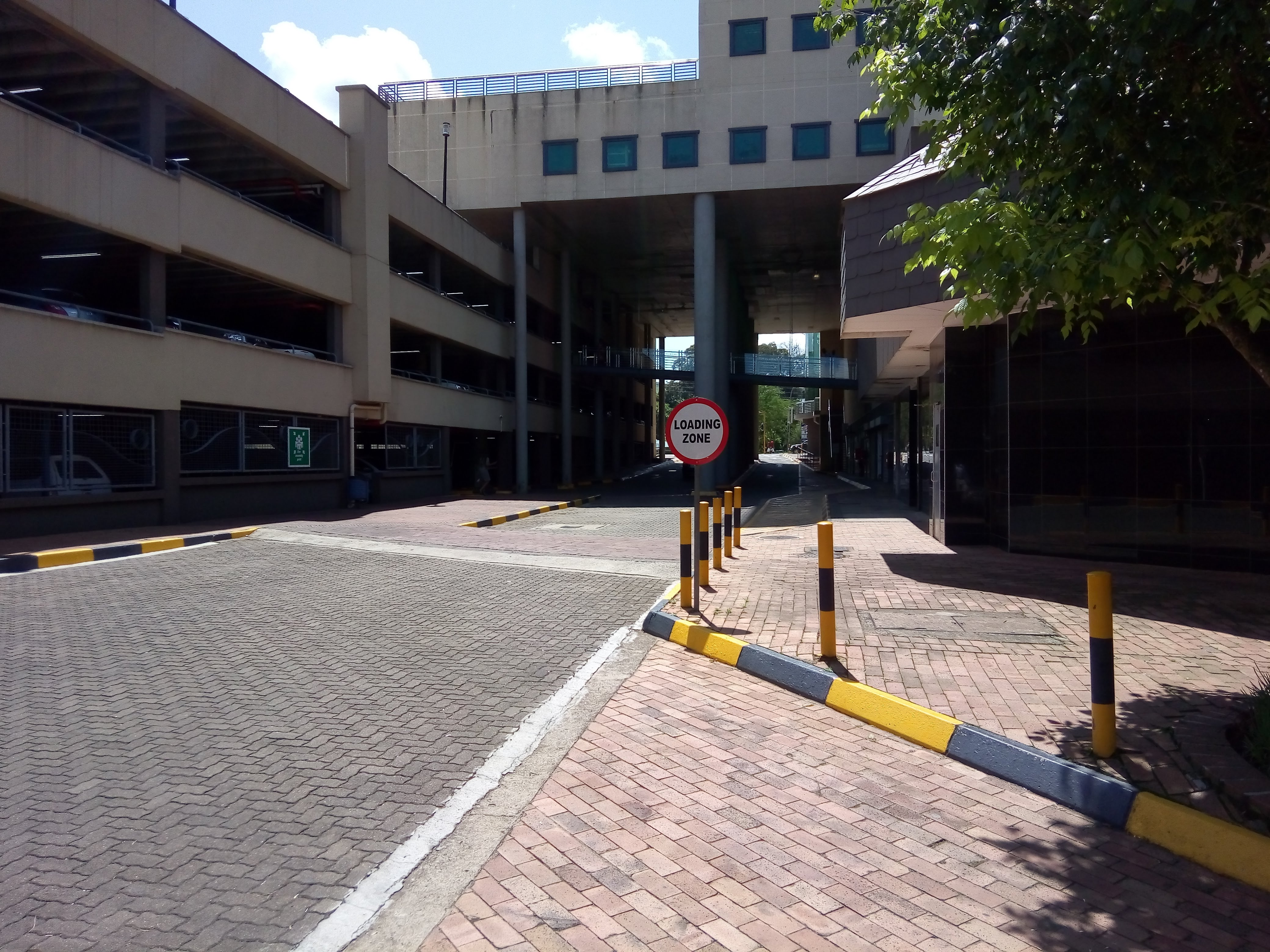
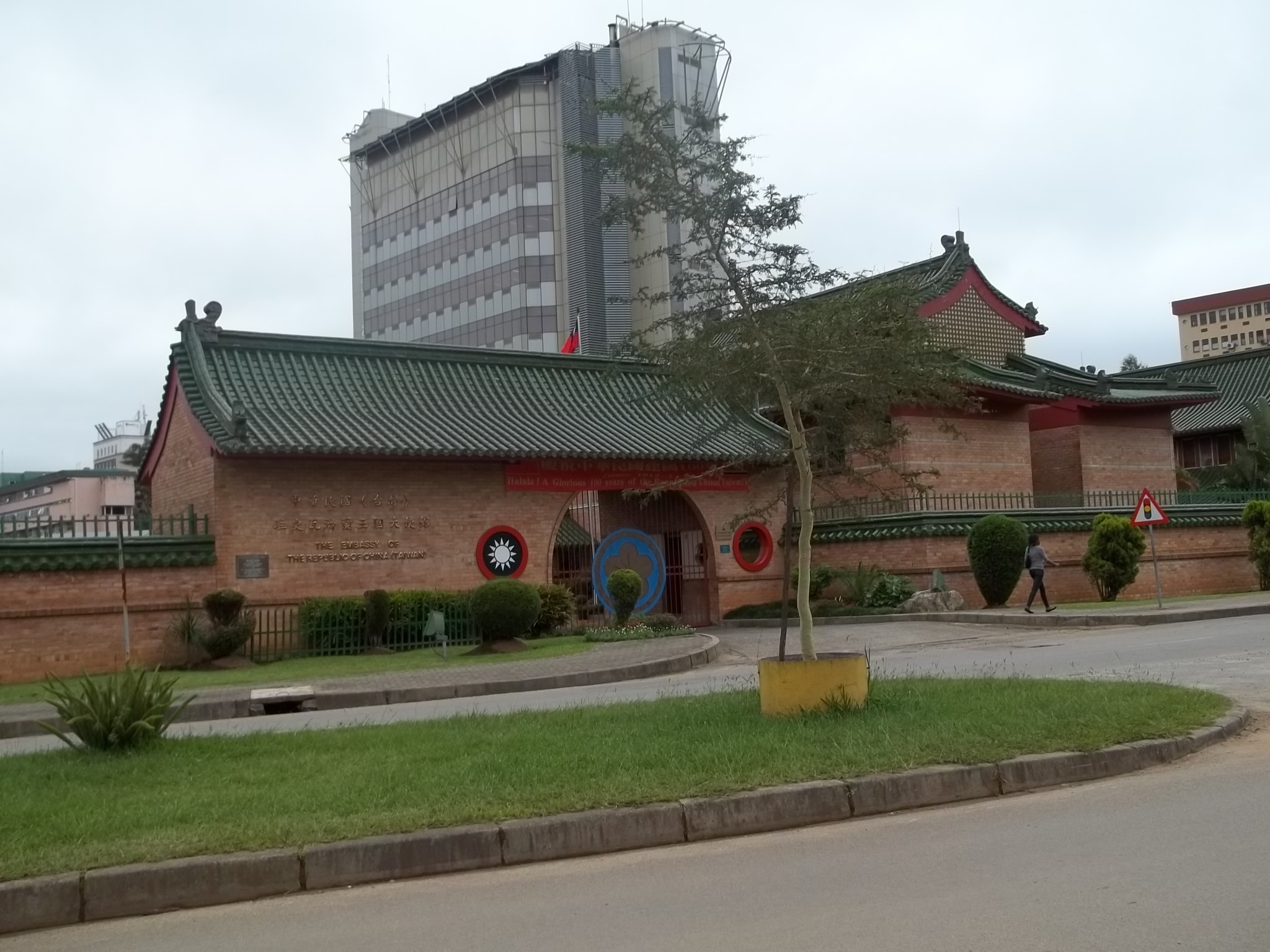
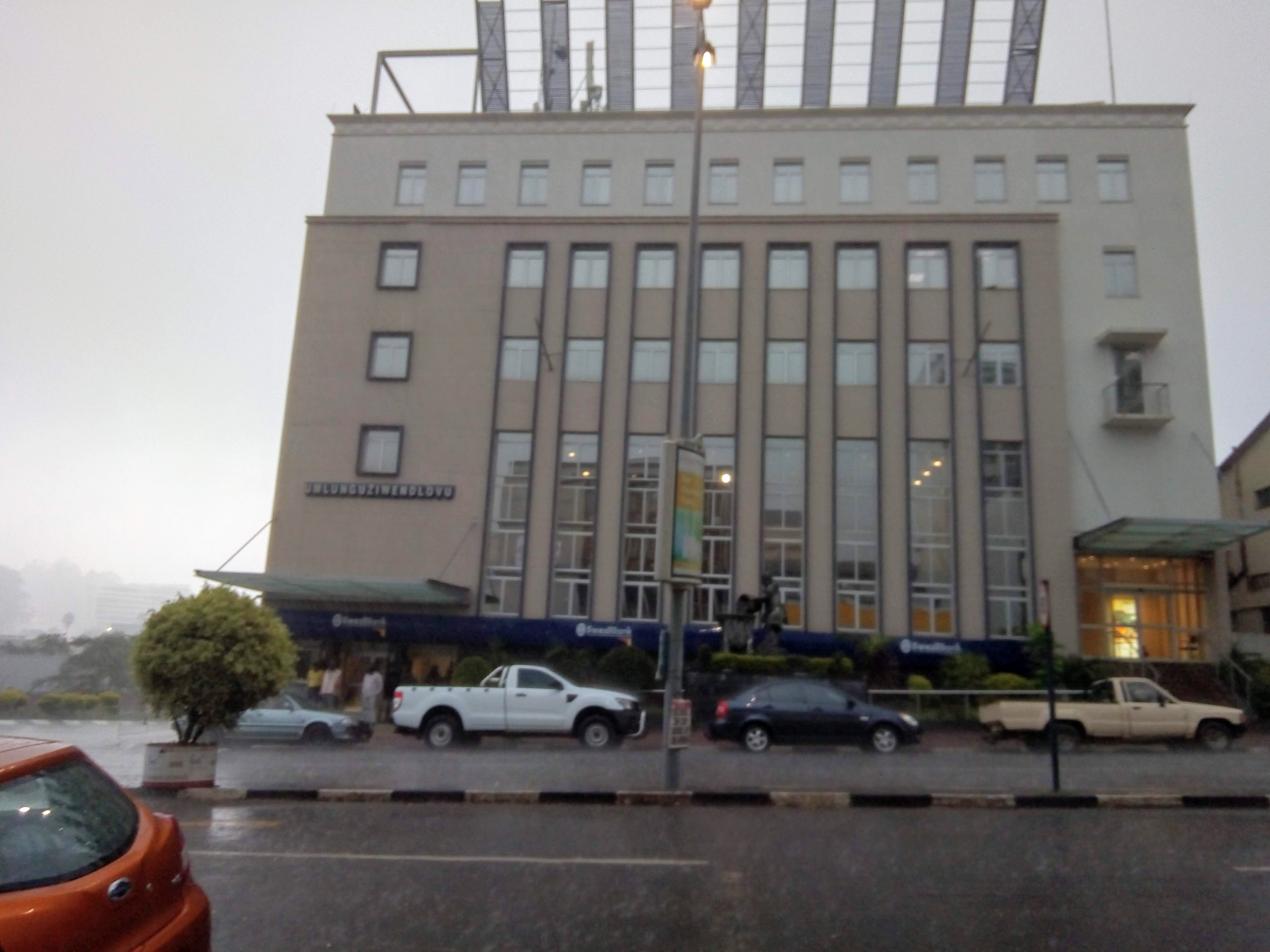
- Panoramic view of Mbabane South African High Commission Swazi Plaza Taiwanese Embassy Eswatini Central Bank

- Location within Eswatini Location within Africa
- Coordinates: 26°19′34″S 31°08′38″E
- Country: Eswatini
- Region: Hhohho
- Founded: 1902

Government
  - Mayor: Vusi Tembe

Area
  - Total: 81.76 km^{2} (31.57 sq mi)
- Elevation: 1,243 m (4,078 ft)

Population (2010)
  - Total: 94,874
  - Density: 1,160/km^{2} (3,005/sq mi)
- Time zone: UTC+02:00 (SAST)
- Postal code: H100
- Climate: Cwb
- Website: www.mbabane.org.sz

Mbabane (/ˌʌmbɑːˈbɑːneɪ/) is the most populous city in Eswatini (previously called Swaziland), and is one of the two capitals (along with Lobamba), serving as the executive capital.

It has an estimated population of 94,874 (2010). It is located on the Mbabane River and its tributary the Polinjane River in the Mdzimba Mountains. It is located in the Hhohho Region, of which it is also the capital. The average elevation of the city is 1,243 meters. It lies on the MR3 road.

== History ==
The town grew after the nation's administrative centre was moved from Bremersdorp (now called Manzini) in January 1902. It derives its name from a chief, Mbabane Kunene, who lived in the area when some British settlers arrived.

Mbabane was founded in 1887 by Mickey Wells, on the spot where the Transvaal-to-Mozambique route crossed the Mbabane river. Great Britain declared it as the capital of the new Protectorate of Swaziland in 1902. During this time, Mbabane consisted of a few shops, churches and schools founded by white settlers. The black Swazi Africans were not allowed to live in the town and had to reside in nearby rural districts. By the 1930s, Mbabane had electricity, running water, telephone connection and a hospital.

Prior to WWII most Swazis lived in rural districts and worked outside Eswatini, so there was little growth in the town itself. After the war, the creation of trade schools in the city, the arrival of the Goba railway connecting Maputo to the mines in South Africa and Lesotho, and foreign investment within Eswatini (particularly in the sugar industry) all contributed to the city's growth. Mbabane became the central hub for development in Hhohho.

In the years following independence, governmental buildings such as the British Consulate were built in Mbabane. Growth has occurred with the tourism industry in Eswatini, of which Mbabane has become the centre. Mbabane today is home to hotels and recreational sites such as clubs and golf courses tending to tourists.

== Geography ==
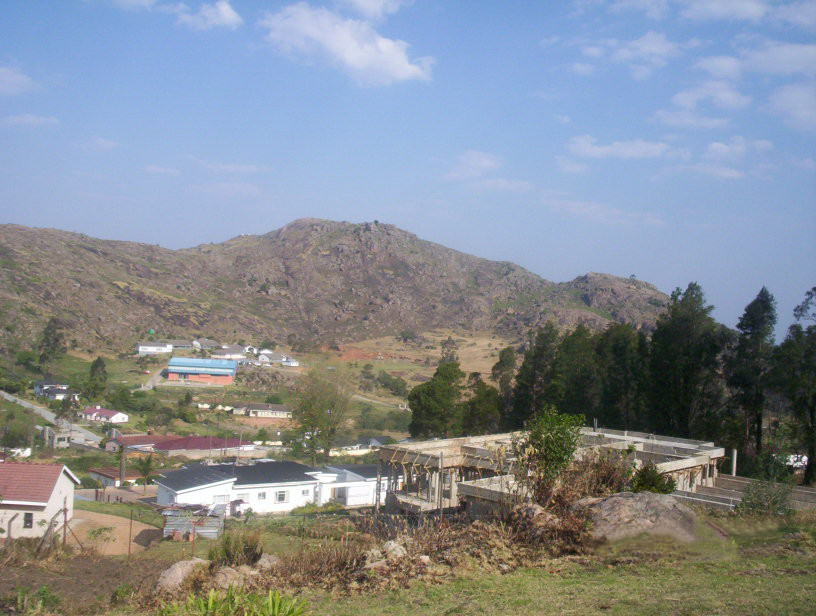
View of Mbabane

Mbabane is located in the district of Hhohho, of which it is also the capital, and lies on the Mbabane River and its tributary the Polinjane River in the Mdzimba Mountains. The average elevation of the city is 1,243 metres. Neighbourhoods and suburbs include Mbangweni, Sidvwashini, Kent Rock, Sandla, Westridge Park, Malunge, New Checkers, Msunduza and Vukutentele.

=== Climate ===
Due to its altitude, Mbabane features a moderate subtropical highland climate (Köppen: Cwb). The city has a mild climate and snow is a rare event, occurring only three times since 1900. The city averages only four days of frost a year. The average temperature is 11 °C (52 °F) in July and 22 °C (72 °F) in January. The thermal range is low, but the winter night is cold for a subtropical climate in general. Most of the precipitation is concentrated in the summer. The difference in the driest month (June) and the wettest (January) is 210 mm.

Climate data for Mbabane (1991-2020 normals, extremes 1957-present)
Month	Jan	Feb	Mar	Apr	May	Jun	Jul	Aug	Sep	Oct	Nov	Dec	Year
Record high °C (°F)	35.0 (95.0)	35.5 (95.9)	33.5 (92.3)	32.5 (90.5)	29.4 (84.9)	26.8 (80.2)	28.6 (83.5)	31.2 (88.2)	34.1 (93.4)	38.3 (100.9)	34.5 (94.1)	36.2 (97.2)	38.3 (100.9)
Mean daily maximum °C (°F)	25.6 (78.1)	25.2 (77.4)	24.8 (76.6)	23.1 (73.6)	21.2 (70.2)	19.3 (66.7)	19.3 (66.7)	21.2 (70.2)	23.1 (73.6)	24.0 (75.2)	24.4 (75.9)	25.3 (77.5)	23.0 (73.5)
Daily mean °C (°F)	20.4 (68.7)	20.0 (68.0)	19.5 (67.1)	17.5 (63.5)	14.9 (58.8)	12.6 (54.7)	12.5 (54.5)	14.5 (58.1)	16.8 (62.2)	18.1 (64.6)	18.9 (66.0)	19.9 (67.8)	17.1 (62.8)
Mean daily minimum °C (°F)	15.3 (59.5)	14.9 (58.8)	14.3 (57.7)	11.9 (53.4)	8.7 (47.7)	6.0 (42.8)	5.7 (42.3)	7.8 (46.0)	10.5 (50.9)	12.2 (54.0)	13.5 (56.3)	14.6 (58.3)	11.3 (52.3)
Record low °C (°F)	8.6 (47.5)	6.4 (43.5)	6.0 (42.8)	3.4 (38.1)	−1.3 (29.7)	−4.5 (23.9)	−6.1 (21.0)	−2.5 (27.5)	−1.0 (30.2)	−1.0 (30.2)	5.5 (41.9)	6.6 (43.9)	−6.1 (21.0)
Average rainfall mm (inches)	205 (8.1)	161 (6.3)	118 (4.6)	64 (2.5)	21 (0.8)	15 (0.6)	16 (0.6)	22 (0.9)	44 (1.7)	93 (3.7)	139 (5.5)	142 (5.6)	1,040 (40.9)
Average rainy days	16.3	14.1	12.9	8.3	4.2	2.7	2.4	3.9	6.4	12.1	15.3	15.9	114.5
Mean monthly sunshine hours	172.7	162.1	194.6	195.2	226.0	233.0	238.9	246.3	209.2	178.4	160.9	170.1	2,387.1
Percentage possible sunshine	41	45	52	57	68	75	73	72	59	45	40	40	55
Source 1: WMO
Source 2: NOAA (extremes, sunshine 1970-1975); World Meteorological Organization 1991–2020 Temp/Precip/Humidity/Sun and the Eswatini Meteorological Service (Extremes)

== Economy ==
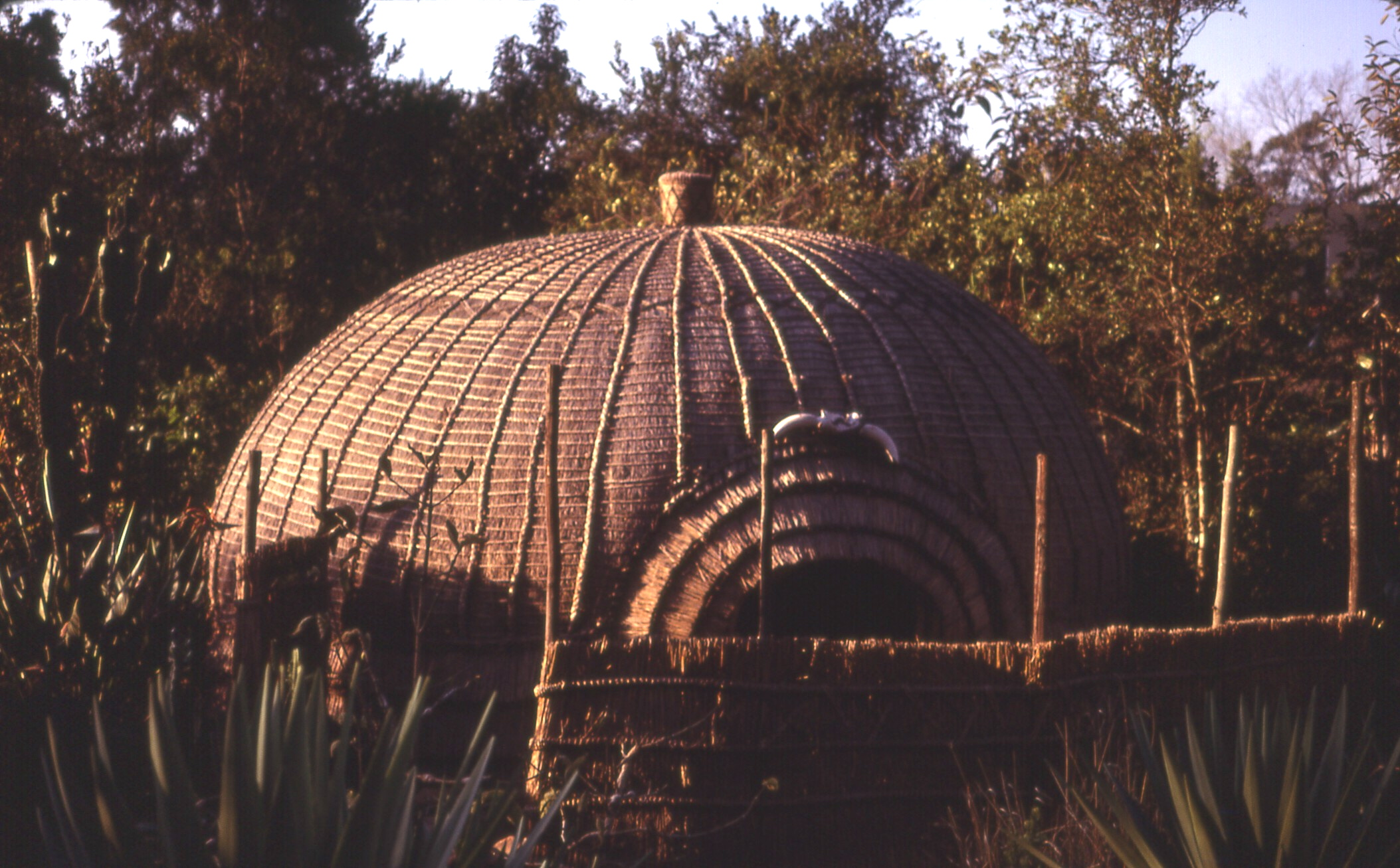
Portable market hut in Mbabane, 1979

Mbabane's closest border crossing to South Africa is Ngwenya-Oshoek. Though siSwati is the primary language, English is widespread. Mbabane, and Eswatini itself, depend on tourism and sugar exports. It is a commercial hub for the surrounding region, and tin and iron were mined nearby. The city has two sites for light industries.

The financial service sector in Mbabane is a key driver of economic growth, providing a wide array of services such as banking, investment management, and insurance, The continuous growth of the financial services sector in Mbabane has resulted in the city becoming a financial hub in the region. It contributes to the overall economic progress of Eswatini.

== Culture ==
Established in 1982, Indingilizi Gallery in Mbabane features a range of Swazi art, including sculptures, paintings, batiks, mohair, ethnic jewellery and pottery.

== Places of worship ==
City residents follow multiple faiths, with predominantly Christian churches: Roman Catholic Diocese of Manzini (Catholic Church), Swaziland Reformed Church (World Communion of Reformed Churches), and Zion Christian Church. In addition there are Muslim mosques.

== Healthcare ==
- Young Heroes (organization) (2006)

== Education ==
Mbabane is the home of Waterford-Kamhlaba United World College of Southern Africa. It has one of the three campuses of the University of Eswatini. Limkokwing University of Creative Technology is a private international university that lies by the South African-Eswatini border.

== Notable people ==
- Mark Easter – former rugby union footballer
- Lindiwe Sisulu – South African politician
- Richard E. Grant – actor
- Matthew Parris – British political writer and broadcaster
- George Getzel Cohen – founded Harry's Angels
- G. W. Reynolds – South African optometrist and authority on the genus Aloe
- Anna Livia – lesbian feminist author and linguist
- Noma Dumezweni – South African-British actress
- Dennis Masina – former footballer
- Sibusiso Dlamini – footballer
- Sikhanyiso Dlamini – Swazi princess and politician
- Cobie Legrange – South African professional golfer
- Christopher Watts – Anglican bishop
- Maurice S. Parker – footballer
- Ian Khama – fourth President of the Republic of Botswana
- Modison Salayedvwa Magagula – Swazi novelist, educator, playwright, poet and short-story author
- Ndumiso Mamba – former minister of justice in Swaziland
- Yvette Christiansë – South African-born poet and novelist
- Philippa Mdluli – Swazi child killer; last person to be executed by Eswatini
- Lucas Mlambo – Swazi painter
- Lucas Macie – Mozambiquan-Swazi painter
- Darren Christie – Liswati footballer
- Chakyl Camal – Australian-Mozambican Entrepreneur, swimmer
- Jani Simulambo – former Zambian footballer and coach
- John Ddumba Ssentamu – Ugandan economist, academic and banker
- Lisa de la Motte – Swazi former swimmer
- Gcinile Moyane – retired Swazi sprinter
- Jama Mahlalela – Swazi-Canadian basketball coach
- John de la Hay Gordon – British army officer, administrator and diplomat
- Michael S. Hoza – American diplomat
- David Gresham – South African independent record producer, publisher, promoter, and radio and television personality
- Cleopas Dlamini – prime minister of Eswatini from 2021 to 2023
- Nobuhle Dlamini – professional golfer
- Neville Markham – South African cricketer
- Veronica Sentongo – Ugandan telecommunications and electrical engineer
- John Macmillan – British actor

== Twin towns – sister cities ==
Mbabane is twinned with:

- (United States) Fort Worth, Texas, US
- Taipei, Taiwan
- Kaohsiung, Taiwan
- Mersing, Malaysia
- Melilla, Spain
- Maputo, Mozambique

== Bibliography ==
- Paul Tiyambe Zeleza; Dickson Eyoh, eds. (2003). "Mbabane, Swaziland". Encyclopedia of Twentieth-Century African History. Routledge. ISBN 0415234794.
