= Catholic Church in Eswatini =

The Catholic Church in Eswatini is part of the worldwide Catholic Church, under the spiritual leadership of the Pope in Rome.

The Catholic Church began in Eswatini in 1913 with the arrival of Servite missionaries who began work in Mbabane. Two of Eswatini's bishops were born in Eswatini: MandleNkhosi Zwane and Ncamiso Ndlovu.

The country forms a single diocese - the Diocese of Manzini.

In 2022, local religious leaders estimated that 20% of Eswatini's population is Catholic. Eswatini's 2017 official census reported that there are an estimated 35.969 Catholics in the country, representing 3.7% from Eswatini's population.

In 2020, there were 33 priests and 54 nuns serving across 17 parishes.

== See also ==
- Religion in Eswatini
