= Inkhundla =

Type of administrative subdivision in Eswatini

In Eswatini, an inkhundla (Swazi: [iŋkʰunɮʱa]; plural: tinkhundla) is an administrative subdivision smaller than a district but larger than an umphakatsi (or "chiefdom"). There are 55 tinkhundla in Eswatini: 14 in Hhohho District, 11 in Lubombo District, 16 in Manzini District, and 14 in Shishelweni District. According to the constitution of Eswatini, the government for Eswatini is a democratic, participatory, tinkhundla-based system that emphasizes devolution of state power from central government to tinkhundla areas and individual merit as a basis for election or appointment to public office. The system is non-partisan since the constitution does not recognize political parties, although section 25 of the constitution allows for open freedom of assembly and association. Each inkhundla elects one representative to the House of Assembly of Eswatini, the lower chamber of the bicameral parliament (Libandla). The same trend is applied in local government elections. This governing system was designed by King Sobhuza II with the assistance of political scholars and lawyers. It came to effect in 1978 and was adjusted in the early 1990s.

== History ==
The tinkhundla concept of government has its roots in the Second World War, led by Prince Dabede of Gundvwini Royal Residence and Ndvuna Mfundza John Brightwell Sukati of Zabeni Royal Residence. They were part of a group of veteran Swazi soldiers who came back from the Middle East after the war in 1945 and 1946. These soldiers spent some time with King Sobhuza II, relating their experiences gained along the seashores of the African Continent during the British military campaign from the Durban seaport to Tripoli in North Africa. They recommended that in order for the economy of Swaziland to recover from the ravages of the war, community centres (tinkhundla) should be established and rally support for the King's endeavors to bring about proportional development of the country. This would also strengthen and enhance national safety and security strategies.

In 1977, the King Sobhuza II-appointed Delimitation Commission came up with a recommendation of twenty-two (22) Tinkhundla centres. The first tinkhundla established were headed by Tindvuna teTinkhundla who were all ex-soldiers (umsizi) appointed by King Sobhuza II.

In 1979, tinkhundla centers were increased from 22 to 40, because it was found that most people failed to attend and participate in tinkhundla meetings. In 1993, the tinkhundla centres were further increased to 55, following the recommendations of the Delimitation Commission that was appointed by King Mswati III. This commission was a result of people's input during consultative commissions (vuselas), which were led by Prince Masitsela, Prince Mahlalengangeni and Prince Guduza.

== Governance role ==
The system emphasizes the devolution of state power from central government to tinkhundla while individual merit is the basis for election and appointment into public office. In general, tinkhundla stimulate community development at the grassroots level, coordinating and promoting a good relationship between government and non-governmental organisations (NGOs) working at the tinkhundla level. They further provide a link between communities and government as well as other development agents to ensure the responsiveness of all national policies to the needs of the people. In the process, they create harmony among all agents providing services within that inkhundla.

The Ministry of Tinkhundla Administration and Development has a mandate to facilitate the management of region development and promote service delivery at tinkhundla and chiefdom levels. Tinkhundla are the foundation for the bottom-up development planning process and the delivery of local services in partnership with the central government. A major area of focus in the process is the development, implementation, monitoring, and evaluation of evidence-based, integrated development plans funded by development grants and the central government budget where applicable. The Ministry also has a mandate to bring about improvements in the performance and effectiveness of the administration and management of the regions, tinkhundla committees, and chiefdoms.

== Economic role ==
Tinkhundla centres are economic growth points where people meet and communities are mobilised to embark on business projects that have been allocated Tinkhundla Empowerment Funds. Initially, these funds were worth E70,000 per inkhundla, but lately, it has been upgraded to E130,000. This covers the payment of utilities, stationery, and minor maintenance of the tinkhundla offices.

== See also ==
- Panchayat (Nepal)
