= List of oldest universities in continuous operation =

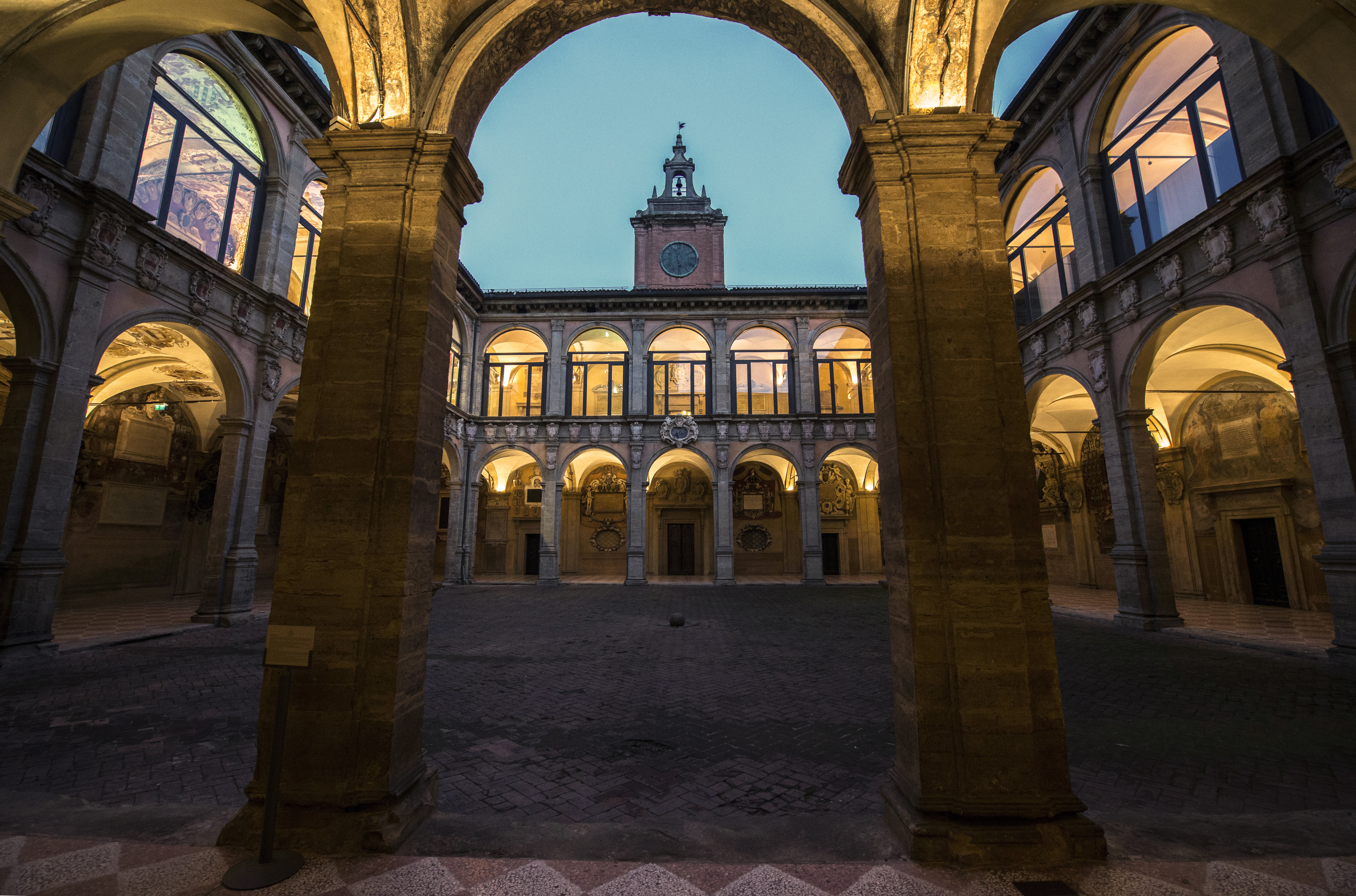
The University of Bologna in Bologna, Italy, the world's oldest university in continuous operation

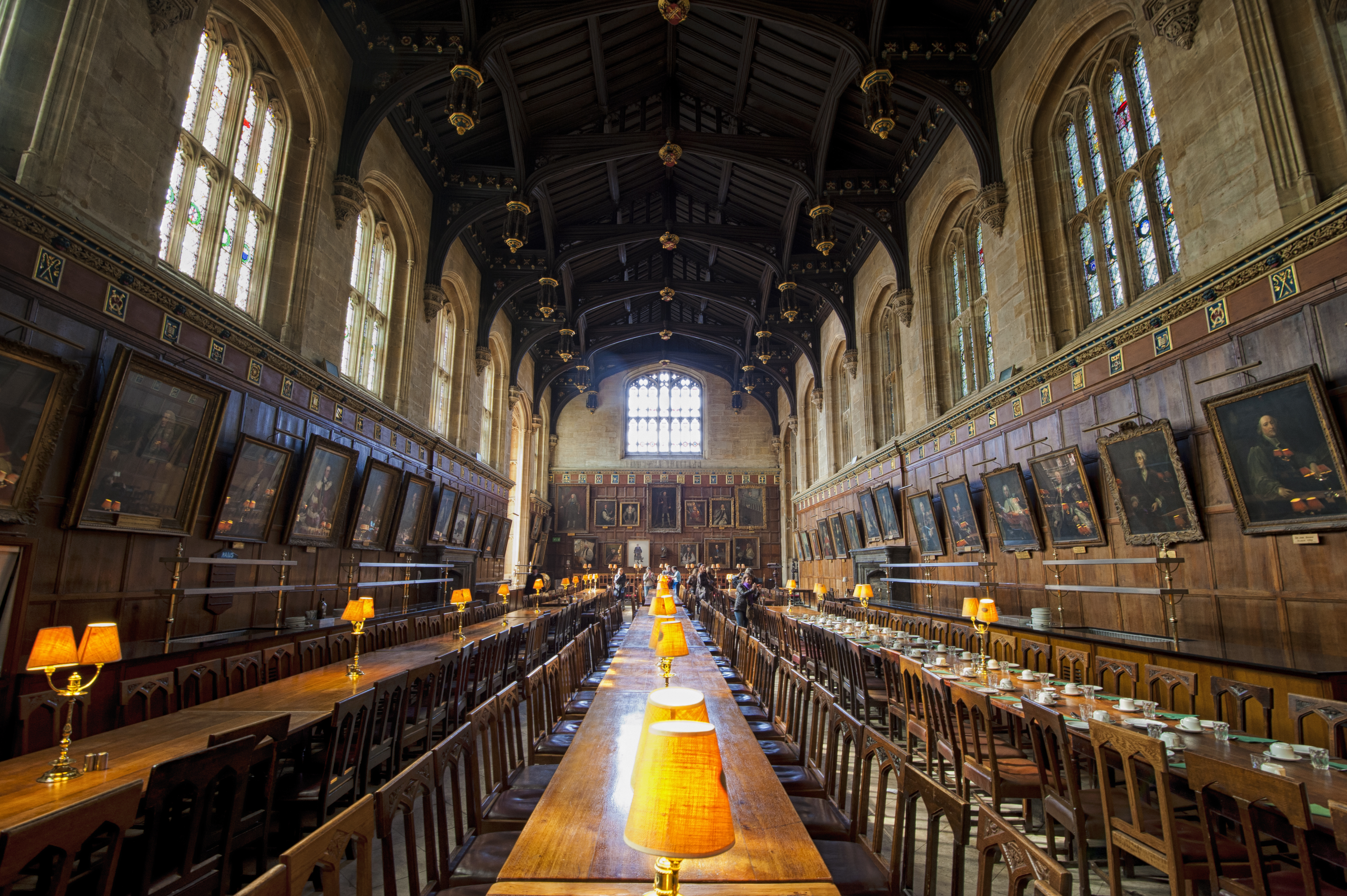
A dining hall at the University of Oxford in Oxford, England, the world's second-oldest university and oldest in the English-speaking world

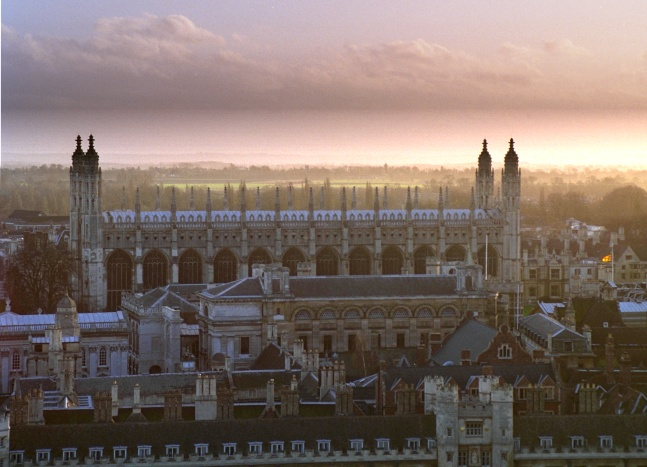
A partial view of the University of Cambridge in Cambridge, England, the world's third-oldest university

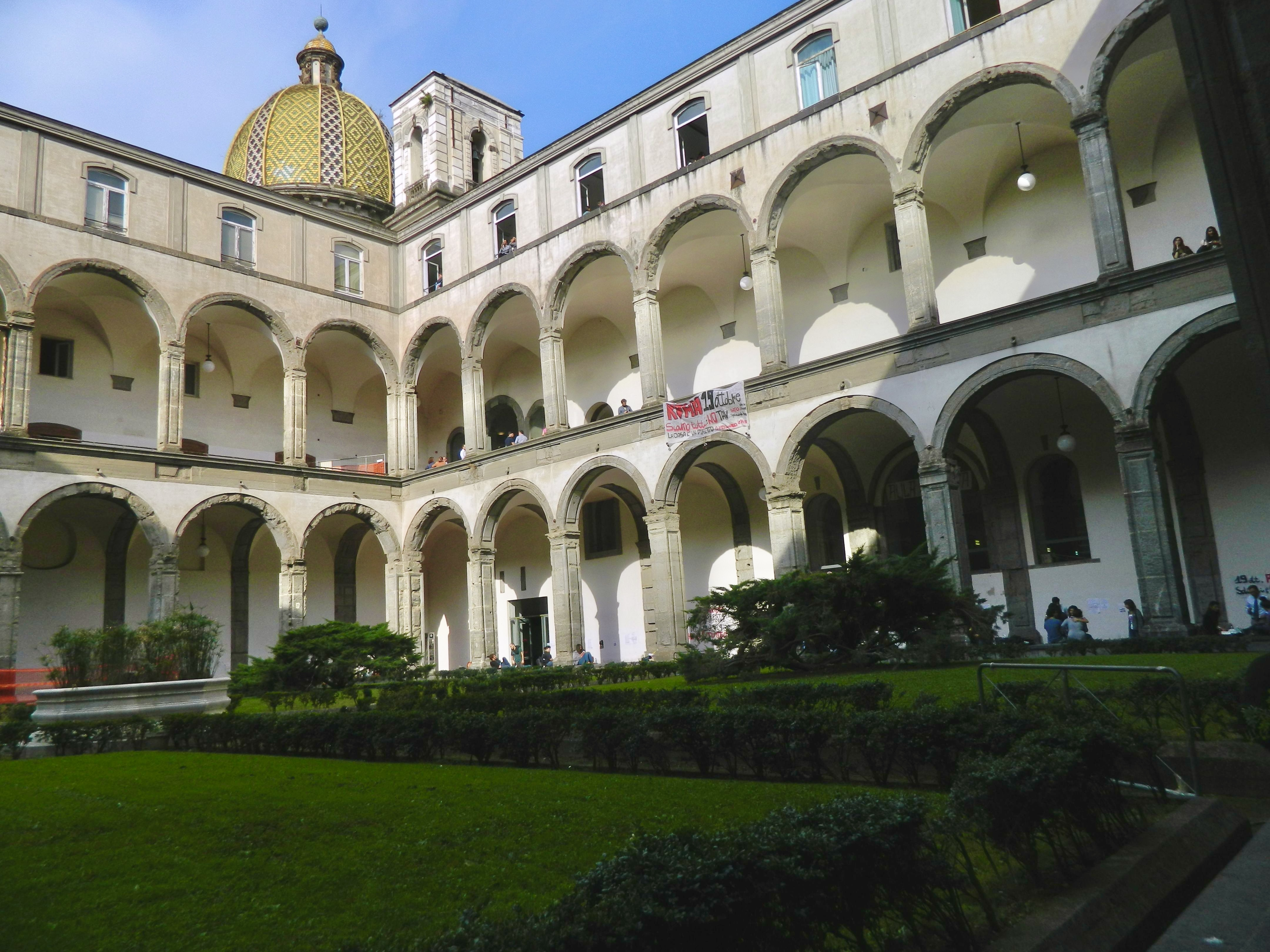
Established in 1224 by Frederick II during his rule as King of Sicily, the University of Naples Federico II in Naples, Italy, is the world's oldest state-funded university in continuous operation.

This is a list of the oldest existing universities in continuous operation in the world.

Inclusion in this list is determined by the date at which the educational institute is generally recognised as having become a university by academic historians, although it may have existed as a different kind of institution before that time. This limits the term "university" to institutions with distinctive structural and legal features that developed in Europe, and which make the university form different from other institutions of higher learning in the pre-modern world, even though these may sometimes now be referred to popularly as universities. (Note: "The statement that all universities are descended either directly or by migration from these three prototypes [Oxford, Paris, and Bologna] depends, of course, on one's definition of a university. And I must define a university very strictly here. A university is something more than a center of higher education and study. One must reserve the term "university" for—and I'm quoting Rashdall here—'a scholastic guild, whether of masters or students, engaged in higher education and study," which was later defined, after the emergence of universities, as "studium generale'.")

The main list consists of institutions generally recognised by historians as having been universities (Latin: studia generalia) prior to 1500, while the second part of the list gives the oldest university derived from the medieval European model in a country, or part of a country where there are multiple university systems identified by independent sources. Institutions must also still be in operation, with institutional continuity retained throughout their history. Some early universities, including the University of Paris, founded around the beginning of the 13th century but abolished by the French Revolution in 1793, are excluded. Some institutions reemerge, but with new foundations, such as the modern University of Paris, which came into existence in 1896 after the Louis Liard law disbanded Napoleon's University of France system.

The word "University" is derived from the Latin universitas magistrorum et scholarium, which approximately means "community of teachers and scholars." The University of Bologna in Bologna, Italy, where teaching began around 1088 and which was organised into a university in the late 12th century, is the world's oldest university in continuous operation, and the first university in the sense of a higher-learning and degree-awarding institute. The origin of many medieval universities can be traced back to the Catholic cathedral schools or monastic schools, which appeared as early as the 6th century and were run for hundreds of years prior to their formal establishment as universities in the high medieval period.

Universities and ancient higher-learning institutions, such as those of ancient Greece, Africa, ancient Persia, ancient Rome, Byzantium, ancient China, ancient India and the Islamic world, are not generally recognised as universities by historians owing to their cultural, historical, structural and legal differences from the medieval European university from which the modern university evolved, thus they are not included in this list. (Note: "No one today would dispute the fact that universities, in the sense in which the term is now generally understood, were a creation of the Middle Ages, appearing for the first time between the twelfth and thirteenth centuries. It is no doubt true that other civilizations, prior to, or wholly alien to, the medieval West, such as the Roman Empire, Byzantium, Islam, or China, were familiar with forms of higher education which a number of historians, for the sake of convenience, have sometimes described as universities. Yet a closer look makes it plain that the institutional reality was altogether different and, no matter what has been said on the subject, there is no real link such as would justify us in associating them with medieval universities in the West. Until there is definite proof to the contrary, these latter must be regarded as the sole source of the model which gradually spread through the whole of Europe and then to the whole world. We are therefore concerned with what is indisputably an original institution, which can only be defined in terms of a historical analysis of its emergence and its mode of operation in concrete circumstances.") (Note: "Thus the university, as a form of social organization, was peculiar to medieval Europe. Later, it was exported to all parts of the world, including the Muslim East; and it has remained with us down to the present day. But back in the Middle Ages, outside of Europe, there was nothing anything quite like it anywhere.") These include the University of al-Qarawiyyin, University of Ez-Zitouna and Al-Azhar University, which were founded as mosques in 859, 698 or 734, and 972 respectively. These developed associated madrasas; the dates when organised teaching began are uncertain, but by 1129 for al-Qarawiyyin in the 13th century for Ez-Zitouna, and Al-Azhar. They became universities in 1963, 1956 and 1961 respectively.

== Medieval origins ==
The university as an institution was historically rooted in medieval society, which it in turn influenced and shaped. Academic historian Walter Rüegg asserts that:

The university is a European institution; indeed, it is the European institution par excellence. There are various reasons for this assertion. As a community of teachers and taught, accorded certain rights, such as administrative autonomy and the determination and realisation of curricula (courses of study) and of the objectives of research as well as the award of publicly recognised degrees, it is a creation of medieval Europe, which was the Europe of papal Christianity [...].

== Modern spread ==
From the early modern period onwards, the university spread from the medieval Latin West across the globe, eventually replacing all other higher-learning institutions and becoming the preeminent institution for higher education in everywhere. The process occurred in the following chronological order:

- Southern and Western Europe (from the 11th or 12th century)
- Central and Northern Europe (from the 14th or 15th century)
- Americas (from the 16th century)
- Australia (from the 19th century)
- Asia and Africa (from the 19th or 20th century), with the exception of the Philippines, where the University of Santo Tomas was established in the 17th century.

== Founded as universities before 1500 ==
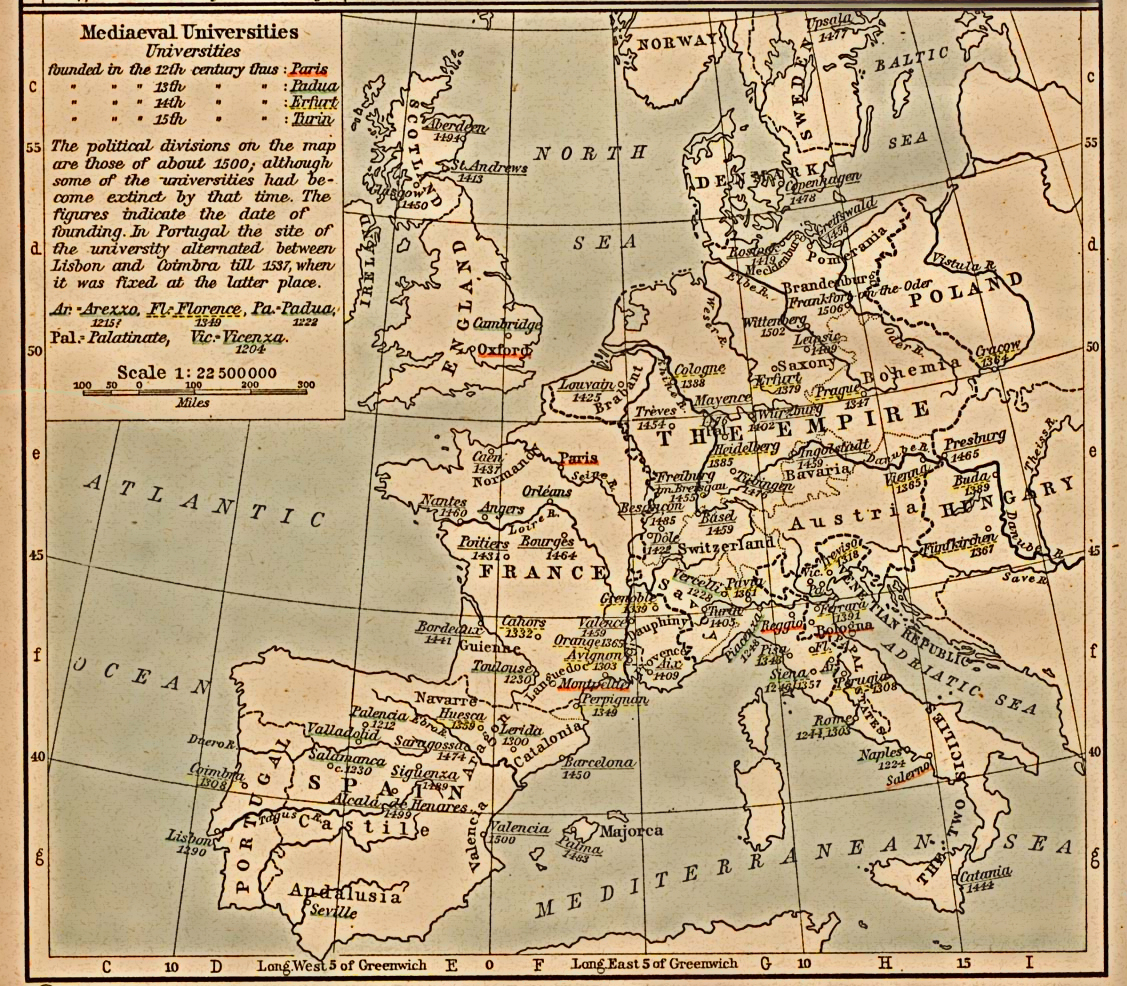
A 1911 map of medieval universities in Europe

This list includes medieval universities that were founded before 1500 and which have retained institutional continuity since then (excluding not only those that ceased to exist, but also those that merged into or split away to an institution which is regarded as newly established). Several of these have been closed for brief periods: for example the University of Siena was closed 1805–1815 during the Napoleonic Wars, and universities in the Czech Republic and Poland were closed during Nazi occupation, 1938–1945.

Universities are dated from when, according to scholars, they first met the definition of a university. In cases such as the universities of Bologna and Oxford which trace their history back to teaching in individual schools prior to their formation into a university, or which existed in another form prior to being a university, the date in the list below is thus later than the date given by the institutions for their foundation.

Founded as universities before 1500
Year	University	Location		Notes
Year	University	Original	Current	Notes
1180–1190 (teaching from c. 1088)	University of Bologna	Kingdom of Italy, Holy Roman Empire	Bologna, Italy	Law schools existed in Bologna from the second half of the 12th century, with 1088 often considered to be the date on which teaching outside of ecclesiastical schools began. In 1158, petitions by Bolognese doctors of law led to Emperor Barbarossa granting the "Authentic Habita", which granted various rights to students and masters but did not name Bologna or any other particular place of study. However, it is unlikely that the university had become organised by the 1150s, and this may have been as late as the 1180s. The law schools appear to have remained independent, private entities until around 1180, but became organised over the following decade. In 1189 the masters made an agreement with the commune not to transfer the studium to another town, while the Lombard students were organised into a "nation" by 1191.
1200–1214 (teaching from c. 1096)	University of Oxford	Kingdom of England	Oxford, United Kingdom	Teaching existed in Oxford from the late 11th century, with the university giving the date of 1096 for the earliest classes. However, it was not until the early 13th century that the schools in Oxford took on an organised character. In 1201 a papal letter described John Grimm as magister scolarum Oxonie. In 1209 the masters suspended their teaching in Oxford and moved to other towns (including Cambridge, leading to the foundation of the university there), returning after a bull issued on 20 June 1214 by the papal legate, Niccolò de Romanis, that granted a number of rights to the university and established the office of chancellor. Both Oxford and Cambridge were granted rights of discipline over students and of fixing rents in letters issued by King Henry III in 1231. A royal charter, sometimes referred to as the Magna Carta of the university, was granted in 1244, awarding further rights to the university. The university received a papal bull Querentes in agro in 1254, with a first version issued on 27 September and a second version on 6 October. The first version followed the common form of privileges granted to monastic houses, confirming the liberties and immunities granted to the university and placing the members of the university under papal protection, but the second version (which was the version recorded in the papal register) explicitly recognised and approved the existence of the university as a scholarly community and confirmed its "liberties, ancient customs and approved statutes".
1209–1225	University of Cambridge	Kingdom of England	Cambridge, United Kingdom	Founded by scholars leaving Oxford after a dispute caused by the execution of three scholars in 1209. The university was organised under a chancellor by 1225. The university takes 1209 as its official founding year. Along with Oxford, Cambridge was granted rights of discipline over its students and of fixing rents in letters issued by King Henry III in 1231. It received papal recognition as an academic corporation via an indult granted by Pope Gregory IX in 1233 and was named as a studium generale in the papal bull Inter singula in 1318. The traditional view was that this raised it to a studium generale but more recent scholarship (which is now generally, although not universally, accepted) sees the bull as confirming, rather than conferring, this status.
1218–1219	University of Salamanca	Kingdom of León	Salamanca, Spain	The oldest extant university in the Hispanic world, (Note: The disputed University of Palencia, founded around 1208–1214, had ceased operations by around 1250 and despite a possible attempted revival in 1263 was extinct by 1300.) The University of Salamanca was founded by Alfonso IX of León in 1218 and recognised by a papal bull from Pope Alexander IV in 1255.
1222	University of Padua	Medieval commune of Padua	Padua, Italy	Founded by scholars and professors after leaving Bologna. Awarded the first degree in the world to be conferred on a woman, Elena Cornaro Piscopia, in 1678.
1224	University of Naples Federico II	Kingdom of Sicily	Naples, Italy	It is the world's oldest state-funded university in continuous operation, and one of the first to be founded by a head of state, Frederick II, Holy Roman Emperor and king of Sicily. Refounded in 1234, 1239 and 1465, and closed 1490–1507.
1290	University of Coimbra	Kingdom of Portugal	Coimbra, Portugal	Originally established in Lisbon but relocated to Coimbra from 1308 to 1338 and again from 1354 to 1377, before finally moving permanently to Coimbra in 1537.
1241 (Papal recognition 1346)	University of Valladolid	Crown of Castile	Valladolid, Spain	Founded in the late 13th century, probably by the city, with the first documented reference dating from 1241.
1308	University of Perugia	Papal States	Perugia, Italy	The university traces its history back to 1276 and statutes were granted in 1306 prior to the bull of Pope Clement V of 8 September 1308.
1348	Charles University	Kingdom of Bohemia, Holy Roman Empire	Prague, Czech Republic	Faculties of theology, law and medicine closed during the Bohemian Reformation, leaving only the faculty of liberal arts. Became Charles-Ferdinand University after the Thirty Years' War, with all four faculties restored. Split into German and Czech parts in 1882; the Czech branch restored the name Charles University after independence in 1918 and closed briefly during Nazi occupation (1939–1945) while the German branch closed permanently in 1945.
1357 (originally 1246–1252)	University of Siena	Republic of Siena	Siena, Italy	Claims to have been founded in 1240 by the Commune of Siena, although Rashdall dates the proclamation of the Studium to 1246, when Frederick II tried to place a ban on scholars travelling to Bologna, the date also given by Verger. Was granted some exemptions from taxes by Pope Innocent II in 1252, but closed shortly after when the scholars returned to Bologna. Attempted revivals in 1275 and (fed by further short-lived migrations of scholars from Bologna) in 1321 and 1338 were unsuccessful. Gained an Imperial Bull in 1357 "granting it de novo the 'privileges of a Studium Generale.'", but was not firmly established until "[i]n 1408 a fresh grant of privileges was obtained from Pope Gregory XII". Closed temporarily in 1808–1815 when Napoleonic forces occupied Tuscany.
1361	University of Pavia	Domain of the House of Visconti	Pavia, Italy	Transferred to Piacenza 1398–1412. Closed for short periods during the Italian Wars, Napoleonic wars, and Revolutions of 1848.
1364	Jagiellonian University	Kingdom of Poland	Kraków, Poland	Founded by King Casimir the Great as a studium generale in 1364. After the death of Casimir the Great in 1370, the development of the university stalled, with lectures being held in various places across the city, including several churches and the Wawel cathedral school and eventually coming to a pause. The faculty of theology was re-opened in 1397 by Queen Jadwiga who later left a large endowment to the university upon her death in 1399. The university was formally re-established on 26 July 1400 by King Władysław Jagiełło. After Kraków was incorporated into the Austrian Empire, the university was merged with Lwów University from 1805 to 1809. The university was forcibly shut down during the German Occupation of Poland (1939–1945). The staff was deported to German-Nazi concentration camps, and many of its collections were deliberately destroyed by the occupying German authorities. Underground lectures continued for around 800 students during this period and the university formally reopened in 1945.
1365	University of Vienna	Duchy of Austria, Holy Roman Empire	Vienna, Austria	Founded by Rudolf IV, Duke of Austria, granted papal assent in 1384 by Pope Urban VI. The oldest university in the contemporary German-speaking world; it remains a question of definition whether Charles University in Prague was also German-speaking when founded. Due to its strong association with the Catholic Church, the university suffered setbacks during the Reformation, but never ceased operation.
1385	Ruprecht Karl University of Heidelberg	Electoral Palatinate, Holy Roman Empire	Heidelberg, Germany	Oldest university in Germany. Pope Urban VI granted permission for the founding of a university in October 1385 to Rupert I, Elector Palatine; teaching began in June 1386. Gradually declined during the 17th and 18th centuries until re-established as a state-owned institution by Karl Friedrich, Grand Duke of Baden in 1803.
c. 1400 (originally 1343 to c. 1360)	University of Pisa	Republic of Pisa	Pisa, Italy	Established 1343 but closed around 1360; refounded at the start of the 15th century. Formally founded on 3 September 1343 by a bull of Pope Clement VI, although according to the university "a number of scholars claim its origin dates back to the 11th century". Transferred to Pistoia, Prato and Florence between 1494 and 1543.
1404	University of Turin	Duchy of Savoy	Turin, Italy	
1409	University of Leipzig	Holy Roman Empire	Leipzig, Germany	
1410–1413	University of St. Andrews	Kingdom of Scotland	St. Andrews, United Kingdom	A school of higher studies was founded at St Andrews in 1410 by a group of Augustinian clergy, driven from the University of Paris by the Avignon schism and from the universities of Oxford and Cambridge by the Anglo-Scottish Wars. St Andrews was the obvious choice for such a school in Scotland — "for centuries, it was the heart of the Scottish church and political activities" and "the seat of the greatest bishopric in Scotland and location of a monastery noted as a centre for learning". A charter of incorporation and privileges was granted on 28 February 1412 by the Bishop of St Andrews, Henry Wardlaw. He petitioned Antipope Benedict XIII to grant the school university status, which was conferred by a series of papal bulls on 28 August 1413. King James I of Scotland confirmed the charter of the university in 1432. Subsequent kings supported the university, with King James V of Scotland "confirming privileges of the university" in 1532.
1419	University of Rostock	Holy Roman Empire	Rostock, Germany	Continuous operation during the Reformation is disputed. Some sources state that "the Catholic university of Rostock closed altogether and the closure was long enough to make the refounded body feel a new institution" and that the university fell into complete decay after the beginning of the Reformation in (1523) when the university revenues were lost and matriculations ceased". However, Johann Oldendorp is reported by several sources as having held a professorship at the university from 1526 to 1534, although this is not proven beyond doubt, and other historians refer to "the remaining university lecturers" as supporting plans to restore the university revenues in 1532 (which was eventually accomplished via the Rostock Formula concordiae in 1563). There are records of a number of professors being appointed in 1551, including Johannes Aurifaber, David Chytraeus, and Johann Draconites.
1430 (originally 1391–1394)	University of Ferrara	House of Este	Ferrara, Italy	
1431 (originally 1303 to c. 1400)	Sapienza University of Rome	Papal States	Rome, Italy	Founded in 1303 but closed at the end of the 14th century; refounded 1431.
1444	University of Catania	(Kingdom of the Two Sicilies) Kingdom of Sicily	Catania, Italy	Oldest university in Sicily. Founded in 1434 when King Alfonso I of Sicily, authorized the creation of a Studium Generale with the power to grant official academic degrees. However, it was not until 1444 that Pope Eugene IV issued the official founding bull for the Siculorum Gymnasium.
1450	University of Barcelona	Crown of Aragon	Barcelona, Spain	Founded by Alfonso V of Aragon on 3 September 1450 as the Estudi General de Barcelona. From 1401 the city had a medical school founded by King Martin of Aragon (the Estudi General de Medecina de Barcelona), to which a faculty of arts was added in 1402. Before this, there were chairs of higher education (associated with the cathedral, the Dominican Convent of Santa Carolina, and the escoles majors supported by the city's governing council) from the 13th century.
1451	University of Glasgow	Kingdom of Scotland	Glasgow, United Kingdom	Founded by papal bull in 1451, it is the fourth-oldest university in the English-speaking world and one of Scotland's four ancient universities. Along with the universities of Edinburgh, Aberdeen, and St Andrews, the university was part of the Scottish Enlightenment during the 18th century.
1456	University of Greifswald	Holy Roman Empire	Greifswald, Germany	Some professors from Rostock taught temporarily in Greifswald between 1437 and 1443 due to unrest in Rostock. The university was founded in 1456 by Duke Wartislaw IX with the approval of Pope Callixtus III on the initiative of Heinrich Rubenow, Lord Mayor of Greifswald (and first rector). Teaching paused temporarily during the Protestant Reformation (1527–39).
1457	Albert Ludwigs University of Freiburg	Holy Roman Empire	Freiburg, Germany	A papal bull of 1455 authorised the Bishop of Constance to establish a university, and in 1457 a ducal charter from Albert VI, Archduke of Austria founded the university.
1459	University of Basel	Holy Roman Empire	Basel, Switzerland	
1459–1472	LMU Munich	Holy Roman Empire	Munich, Germany	Papal bull obtained in 1459 from Pope Pius II by Louis the Rich but opening delayed by war. Opened in Ingolstadt in 1479. Transferred to Landshut in 1800 and then to Munich in 1826.
1475–1479	University of Copenhagen	Kingdom of Denmark within the Kalmar Union	Copenhagen, Denmark	Founded by papal bull in 1475 and royal decree in 1478, opening in 1479.
1476	Eberhard Karls University of Tübingen	Holy Roman Empire	Tübingen, Germany	
1477	Uppsala University	Kingdom of Sweden within the Kalmar Union	Uppsala, Sweden	Established in 1477 by the Catholic Archbishop Jakob Ulvsson. Decayed due to political unrest in the first decade of the 16th century and then the Reformation in the 1520s and 30s, remaining "only an idea without real content" until re-chartered in 1595.
1495	University of Aberdeen	Kingdom of Scotland	Aberdeen, United Kingdom	King's College was founded by a papal bull in 1495 and then Marischal College in 1593; they merged in 1860.
1499	Complutense University of Madrid	Crown of Castile	Madrid, Spain	A studium generale was founded by Sancho IV of Castile in 1293 in Alcalá de Henares. Very little is known of this institution over the next two centuries. In 1499 a papal bull was granted by Pope Alexander VI authorising Archbishop Cisneros to establish a Colegio Mayor in Alcalá with the same powers as the universities of Salamanca and Valladolid, from which date Verger considers it a university. The new university opened in 1509. The university was moved to Madrid in 1836 by royal decree.
1500	University of Valencia	Crown of Aragon	Valencia, Spain	

== Oldest universities by country or region after 1500 still in operation ==
Many universities were established at institutes of learning such as schools and colleges that may have been founded significantly earlier but were not classed as universities upon their foundation; this is normally described in the notes for that institution. In some countries (particularly the US and those influenced by its culture), degree-granting higher education institutions that would normally be called universities are instead called colleges. In this case, both the oldest institution that would normally be regarded as a university and the oldest institution (if different) to actually be called a university are given. In many parts of the world, the first university to have a presence was an institution based elsewhere (often the University of London via the affiliation of a local college); where this is different from the first locally established university, both are given.

=== Africa ===
Location		Current name	Year	Notes
Current	Original	Current name	Year	Notes
Algeria (Algiers)	(France) French Algeria (Algiers)	University of Algiers	1909	
Angola (Luanda)	(Portugal) Portuguese Angola (Luanda)	Agostinho Neto University	1962	Founded as Estudos Gerais Universitários de Angola. Was renamed Universidade de Luanda (University of Luanda) in 1968. After Angolan independence from Portugal in 1975, the institution was renamed the University of Angola (Universidade de Angola). In 1985 it was renamed Agostinho Neto University, in honour of Agostinho Neto, the first President of Angola.
Benin (Abomey-Calavi)	(Benin) Republic of Dahomey (Abomey-Calavi)	University of Abomey-Calavi	1970	Originally the University of Dahomey. Renamed the National University of Benin in 1975 and took its current name in 2001.
Botswana (Gaborone, Francistown, Maun)		University of Botswana	1964 (as part of the University of Botswana, Lesotho and Swaziland; university 1982)	
Burkina Faso (Ouagadougou)	Republic of Upper Volta (Ouagadougou)	University of Ouagadougou	1974	
Burundi (Bujumbura)	Kingdom of Burundi (Bujumbura)	University of Burundi	1964	
Cameroon (Yaoundé)	Federal Republic of Cameroon (Yaoundé)	University of Yaoundé	1962	In 1993 following a university reform the University of Yaounde was split into two (University of Yaoundé I and University of Yaoundé II) following the university branch-model pioneered by the University of Paris.
Cape Verde (Praia)		Jean Piaget University of Cape Verde	2001	As a result of the merger of the two previously existing higher education establishments (ISE and ISECMAR)
Central African Republic (Bangui)		University of Bangui	1969	
Chad (N'Djamena)		University of N'Djamena	1971	Originally the University of Chad, renamed the University of N'Djamena 1994.
Comoros (Moroni)		University of the Comoros	2003	
DR Congo (Kinshasa)	Belgian Congo (Kinshasa)	University of Kinshasa	1954	Originator established as the Lovanium University, affiliated to the Catholic University of Leuven. Merged into the National University of Zaire in 1971 then demerged under its current name in 1981.
Congo (Brazzaville)	People's Republic of the Congo (Brazzaville)	Marien Ngouabi University	1971	Founded as the University of Brazzaville in 1971, changed to current name in 1977.
Djibouti (Djibouti City)		University of Djibouti	2006	
Egypt (Giza)	Khedivate of Egypt (Cairo)	Cairo University	1908	The oldest university in Egypt and second oldest higher education institution (after Al-Azhar University, which was founded as a madrasa c. 970 and became a university in 1962)
Equatorial Guinea (Malabo)		National University of Equatorial Guinea	1995	
Eritrea (Mai Nefhi)		Eritrea Institute of Technology	2003	Founded following the closure of the University of Asmara, which had been established as a college in 1958
Eswatini (Kwaluseni)	Swaziland (Kwaluseni)	University of Eswatini	1964 (as part of the University of Botswana, Lesotho and Swaziland; university 1982)	Originally established as the University of Swaziland, changed to current name in 2018
Ethiopia (Addis Ababa)	(Ethiopia) Ethiopian Empire (Addis Ababa)	University of Addis Ababa	1950 (as college offering degree courses; university 1962)	The university was originally called the University College of Addis Ababa in 1950, offering courses leading to degrees of the University of London. It became Haile Selassie I University in 1962, named after the Ethiopian Emperor Haile Selassie I. The institution received its current name in 1975.
Gabon (Libreville)		Omar Bongo University	1970	Founded as the National University of Gabon and took current name in 1978
Gambia (Serekunda)		University of the Gambia	1999	
Ghana (Accra)	Gold Coast (Accra)	University of Ghana	1948 (as affiliate college of the University of London; university 1961)	Founded as the University College of the Gold Coast, an affiliate college of the University of London which supervised its academic programmes and awarded the degrees. It gained full university status in 1961.
Guinea (Conakry)		Gamal Abdel Nasser University of Conakry	1962	
Guinea-Bissau (Bissau)		Universidade Colinas de Boé	2003	
Guinea-Bissau (Bissau)		Universidade Amílcar Cabral	2003	
Ivory Coast (Abidjan)		Université Félix Houphouët-Boigny	1964 (as main campus of the University of Abidjan; university 1996)	
Kenya (Nairobi)	Colony and Protectorate of Kenya (Nairobi)	University of Nairobi	1961 (as affiliate college of the University of London; college 1956; university 1970)	Oldest in Kenya. Established 1956 as the Royal Technical College. Renamed the Royal College of Nairobi when it became affiliated to the University of London in 1961. On 20 May 1964, was renamed University College Nairobi when it was admitted as a constituent college of inter-territorial University of East Africa. In 1970, it transformed into the first national university in Kenya and was renamed the University of Nairobi.
Lesotho (Roma)		National University of Lesotho	1964 (as part of the University of Botswana, Lesotho and Swaziland; college 1945; university 1975	
Liberia (Monrovia)		University of Liberia	1951 (college 1863)	Building on Liberia College founded in 1863
Libya (Benghazi & Tripoli)	Kingdom of Libya (Benghazi)	University of Libya	1956	A royal decree was issued on 15 December 1955 for the founding of the university. The first faculty to be formed was the Faculty of Literature in Benghazi, and the royal palace "Al Manar", from which King Idris I of Libya declared its independence on 24 December 1951, was assigned to be the campus. Later divided to University of Benghazi and University of Tripoli, the names were changed again during Gaddafi's era, but now they have reinstated their original names.
Madagascar (Antananarivo)	(France) Colony of Madagascar and Dependencies (Antananarivo)	University of Antananarivo	1961 (as university; institute for advanced studies 1955)	Founded December 1955 as the Institute for Advanced Studies in Antananarivo. Renamed the University of Madagascar in 1961.
Malawi (Zomba, Blantyre & Lilongwe)		University of Malawi	1965	
Mali (Bamako)		University of Bamako	1996	
Mauritania (Nouakchott)		University of Nouakchott Al Aasriya	1981	
Mauritius (Moka)	British Mauritius (Moka)	University of Mauritius	1965	The Faculty of Agriculture is the oldest faculty of the university. It was founded in 1914 as the School of Agriculture in 1914, and in 1966 it was incorporated into the newly established University of Mauritius.
Morocco (Fez)	Idrisid dynasty (Fez)	University of Al Quaraouiyine	1965 (as university; madrasa 859)	Traces its origins back to the al-Qarawiyyin mosque and associated madrasa founded by Fatima al-Fihri in 859, and was named a university in 1965. Considered by some the oldest continuously operating institution of higher learning in the world, though only became an official university in 1965.
Morocco (Rabat)		Mohammed V University	1957	Founded as University of Rabat
Mozambique (Maputo)	(Portugal) Portuguese Mozambique (Lourenço Marques)	Eduardo Mondlane University	1962	
Namibia (Windhoek)		University of Namibia	1992	
Niger (Niamey)		Abdou Moumouni University	1974	Originally the University of Niamey
Nigeria (Ibadan)	Colony and Protectorate of Nigeria (Yaba, Lagos)	University of Ibadan	1949 (as affiliated college of the University of London; college 1932; university 1962)	Founded as Yaba College in 1932 in Yaba, Lagos, as the first tertiary educational institute in Nigeria. Yaba College was transferred to Ibadan, becoming the University College of Ibadan, in 1948 and was a university college associated with the University of London. Independent university since 1962.
Nigeria (Nsukka)	Federation of Nigeria (Nsukka)	University of Nigeria, Nsukka	1960	First university in Nigeria.
Rwanda (Kigali)	Rwanda (Kigali)	University of Rwanda	1963	Founded as the National University of Rwanda in Butare in 1963; incorporated into the University of Rwanda 2013
São Tomé and Príncipe (São Tomé)		University of São Tomé and Príncipe	2014 (as university; polytechnic school 1996)	
Sahrawi Arab Democratic Republic (Tifariti)		University of Tifariti	2013	
Senegal (Dakar)	(France) French Senegal (Dakar)	Cheikh Anta Diop University	1957	
Seychelles (Anse Royale)		University of Seychelles	2009	
Sierra Leone (Freetown)	Sierra Leone Colony and Protectorate (Freetown)	Fourah Bay College	1876 (as affiliated college of Durham University; college 1827; part of University of Sierra Leone 1967)	Oldest university-level institution in Africa. Founded as a missionary school to train teachers in 1827. Became an affiliated college of Durham University in 1876 and awarded first degrees in West Africa in 1878. Became part of the federal University of Sierra Leone in 1967.
Somalia (Mogadishu)	Trust Territory of Somaliland (Mogadishu)	Somali National University	1954	
South Africa (Pretoria)	Cape Colony (Cape Town)	University of South Africa	1873	Originally founded as the University of the Cape of Good Hope in 1916 it was transformed into the federal University of South Africa (Unisa) and relocated to Pretoria.
South Sudan (Juba)	Democratic Republic of the Sudan (Juba)	University of Juba	1975	
Sudan (Khartoum)	Republic of the Sudan (Khartoum)	University of Khartoum	1956 (as university; college 1902)	Renamed from Gordon Memorial College, founded 1902, when it gained full university status in 1956
Tanzania (Dar es Salaam)	Tanganyika Territory (Dar es Salaam)	University of Dar es Salaam	1961 (as affiliated college of the University of London; part of the University of East Africa 1963; university 1970)	
Togo (Lomé)		University of Lomé	1970	Originally the University of Benin, changed to current name in 2001
Tunisia (Tunis)		University of Ez-Zitouna	2012 (as independent university; mosque c. 737)	The oldest higher education institution in Tunisia, it traces its origins back to the Al-Zaytuna Mosque founded around 737 and became an important higher education institution under the Hafsid dynasty in the 13th to 16th century. It was ransacked by the Spanish during their occupation of Tunis in the mid 16th century but was restored in the 17th century. It became part of the University of Tunis (established 1960) in 1965. It was re-founded as an independent institution in 2012.
Tunisia (Tunis)		University of Tunis	1960	Established in 1960 following Tunisia's independence.
Uganda (Kampala)	British Protectorate of Uganda (Kampala)	Makerere University	1949 (as affiliated college of the University of London; part of University of East Africa 1963; university 1970)	Started as a technical college in 1922. Then became an affiliate college of the University of London; part of the University of East Africa 1963. It would become an independent University 1970.
Zambia (Lusaka)		University of Zambia	1966	
Zimbabwe (Harare)	Southern Rhodesia (Salisbury)	University of Zimbabwe	1952 (as affiliated college of the University of London; university 1970)	Founded in 1952 as University College of Rhodesia and Nyasaland. University of Rhodesia from 1970 and University of Zimbabwe from 1980

=== Asia ===
Location		Current name	Year	Notes
Current	Original	Current name	Year	Notes
Afghanistan (Kabul)	Kingdom of Afghanistan (Kabul)	Kabul University	1931	Founded in 1931, formally opened 1932.
Azerbaijan (Baku)	Azerbaijan Democratic Republic (Baku)	Baku State University	1919	In 1930, the government ordered the university shut down in accordance with a reorganization of higher education, and the university was replaced with the Supreme Pedagogical Institute. In 1934 the university was reestablished.
Bahrain (Sakhir, Isa Town)		University of Bahrain	1986	
Bangladesh (Dhaka)	India (Dacca, Bengal Presidency)	University of Dhaka	1921	First university in Bangladesh, opened 1 July 1921.
Bhutan (Thimphu)		Royal University of Bhutan	2003	
Brunei (Bandar Seri Begawan)		University of Brunei Darussalam	1985	
Cambodia (Phnom Penh)	French Protectorate of Cambodia (Phnom Penh)	Royal University of Fine Arts	1917	
China	Qing Empire	Tianjin University	1895	The first higher education institution in China, established in 1895 as National Peiyang University (国立北洋大学). Restructured in 1951 and renamed Tianjin University.
China	Qing Empire	Nanyang Public School and Jiaotong University	1896	Both universities were founded in 1896 and later merged and restructured several times. The most notable of their five modern successors is Shanghai Jiao Tong University.
China	Qing Empire	Peking University	1898	Originally named Jingshi Daxuetang (Chinese: 京師大學堂; lit. 'Capital Grand Study Hall'), then National Beijing University (Chinese: 國立北京大學; pinyin: Guólì Běijīng Dàxué).
Timor-Leste		National University of East Timor	2000	
Hong Kong	Hong Kong	The University of Hong Kong	1911 (as university; college 1887)	Founded as the Hong Kong College of Medicine for Chinese in 1887, incorporated as a university in 1911
India (Serampore)	Danish India (Frederiknagore)	Serampore College	1827 (as university; college 1818)	Incorporated and granted university status and the right to award degrees by royal charter of Frederick VI of Denmark on 23 February 1827, endorsed by the Bengal Government Act 1918.
Indonesia	Dutch East Indies	Bandung Institute of Technology	1920	Founded as Technische Hogeschool. Renamed in 1959.
Indonesia	Dutch East Indies	University of Indonesia	1947 (as university; medical school 1851; Hogeschool 1927)	Incorporates the medical school founded as the Dokter-Djawa School Batavia in 1851, which became the Geneeskundige Hogeschool in 1927 and the Rechts Hogeschool founded in 1924.
Iran	Imperial State of Persia	University of Tehran	1934	Founded by Rezā Shāh, incorporating portions of the Dar ul-Funun Polytechnic Institute (1851) and the Tehran School of Political Sciences (1899)
Iran	Sublime State of Persia	Kharazmi University	1974 (as university; institute 1919)	Named after Khwarizmi (c. 780–850), Persian mathematician, astronomer and geographer. It was established in 1919 as the Central Teachers' Institute and gained university status as Tarbiat Moallem University of Tehran in 1974. It changed its name to Kharazmi University on January 31, 2012.
Iraq	Kingdom of Iraq	University of Baghdad	1956	The Iraqi Royal College of Medicine was established in 1928
Israel	Ottoman Empire (Beirut vilayet)	Technion – Israel Institute of Technology	1912 (opened 1924)	Founded in 1912 (cornerstone laid), but formal teaching began in 1924
Israel	Occupied Enemy Territory Administration	Hebrew University of Jerusalem	1918	Founded in 1918, but formal teaching began in 1925
Japan	Japan	University of Tokyo	1877 (as a university; earliest predecessor 1630)	Previous names are University of Tokyo (1877–1886), Imperial University (1886–1897), and Tokyo Imperial University (1897–1947). Its origins include a private college of Confucian studies founded by Hayashi Razan in 1630, Tenmonkata (The Observatory, 1684) and Shutōsho (Smallpox Vaccination Centre, 1849). The university was established in 1877 by the merger of three institutions: Shoheiko (Japanese and Chinese Literature, established 1789), Yogakusho (Occidental Studies, established 1855) and Shutosho (Vaccinations, established 1860), originally as Tokyo University before becoming the Imperial University and then Tokyo Imperial University before reverting to its original name after World War II.
Japan	Japan	Keio University	1920 (as university; school for Dutch studies 1858)	Founded as a "school for Dutch studies" in 1858. College with three university departments (literature, law and economics) established 1890. Accredited as a university by the Japanese government in 1920.
Japan	Japan	Ryukoku University	1922 (as "Daikyoko (Great School)" 1876; school 1639)	Traces its origins to a school for Buddhist monks of the Nishi Hongan-ji denomination founded in 1639. Assumed its current name and became a university under the University Ordinance in 1922.
Jordan		University of Jordan	1962	
Kazakhstan	Soviet Union ( Kazakh Autonomous Socialist Soviet Republic)	Al-Farabi Kazakh National University	1933	
Kuwait		University of Kuwait	1966	
Kyrgyzstan	Soviet Union (Kirghiz SSR)	Kyrgyz National University	1951 (as university; institute of education 1925)	
Laos		National University of Laos	1996	
Lebanon	Ottoman Empire (Syria vilayet)	American University of Beirut	1920 (as degree-awarding college 1866)	Originally Syrian Protestant College, chartered by the State of New York, took current name in 1920
Lebanon	Ottoman Empire (Syria vilayet)	Saint Joseph University	1872	
Pakistan	India (Punjab)	University of the Punjab	1882	Established by British colonial authorities in 1863 as Lahore University College and later given the university charter in 1882 as the first university in what would become Pakistan.
Macau	Macau	University of Macau	1981	Established as University of East Asia in 1981, renamed 1991
Malaysia	British Malaya	University of Malaya	1905	Established as Straits Settlements and Federated Malay States Government Medical School on 13 July 1905 in Singapore
Maldives		Maldives National University	1998 (as degree awarding college; university 2011)	Established in 1998 as the Maldives College of Higher Education, establishing its first degree course in 2000. Became the Maldives National University in 2011.
Mongolia	Mongolian People's Republic	National University of Mongolia	1942	
Myanmar	Burma	Rangoon University	1878	
Nepal	Nepal	Tribhuvan University	1959	
North Korea	Provisional People's Committee for North Korea	Kim Il-sung University	1946	
Oman		Sultan Qaboos University	1986	
Palestine	Israeli Military Governorate	Bethlehem University	1973	
Philippines	Captaincy General of the Philippines	University of Santo Tomas	1645 (college 1611)	Founded on 28 April 1611 by the Order of Preachers and raised to university status by Pope Innocent X in 1645. The National Historical Commission of the Philippines recognizes it as the oldest university in Asia.
Qatar		Qatar University	1977	
Saudi Arabia		King Saud University	1957	
Singapore	Straits Settlements	National University of Singapore	1905	Founded as Straits and Federated Malay States Government Medical School
South Korea	Korea	Sungkyunkwan University	1946 (as university; royal institution 1398; university 1895; closed 1910–1945)	Sŏnggyun'gwan was established in 1398 as the highest educational institution of the Joseon Dynasty. In 1895, Sungkyunkwan was reformed into a modern three-year university. It was closed in 1910 during the Japanese occupation of Korea. It was refounded as Sungkyunkwan University in 1946.
South Korea	Korea	Ewha Womans University	1946 (as university; school 1886)	Established in 1886 as the Ewha Haktang mission school for girls, started higher education in 1910, and was reorganized as Ewha Womans University in 1946.
Sri Lanka	Ceylon	University of Colombo	1942	Formed in 1942 as the University of Ceylon by the amalgamation of University College Colombo (established 1921) and Ceylon Medical College (established in 1870). Was part of the University of Sri Lanka 1972–1978.
Syria	State of Damascus	University of Damascus	1923	Founded in 1923 through the merger of the School of Medicine (established 1903) and the Institute of Law (established 1913)
Taiwan	Japanese Taiwan	National Taiwan University	1928	Founded as Taihoku (Taipei) Imperial University
Tajikistan	Soviet Union (Tajik SSR)	Tajik National University	1947	
Turkmenistan (Ashgabat)	Soviet Union (Turkmen SSR)	Turkmen State University	1950 (as university; pedagogical institute 1931)	
Thailand	Rattanakosin Kingdom	Chulalongkorn University	1917 (as university; college 1899)	
United Arab Emirates		United Arab Emirates University	1976	
Vietnam	French Indochina	Hanoi Medical University	1902	
Vietnam	French Indochina	Vietnam National University, Hanoi	1904	Originally the University of Indochina, first full subject university in Vietnam.
Yemen	Yemen Arab Republic	Sanaa University	1970	

=== Europe ===
While Europe had 143 universities in 1789, the French Revolutionary and Napoleonic Wars took a heavy toll, reducing the number to 83 by 1815. The universities of France were abolished and over half of the universities in both Germany and Spain were destroyed. By the mid 19th century, Europe had recovered to 98 universities.

Location		Current name	Year	Notes
Current	Original	Current name	Year	Notes
Albania (Tirana)	People's Socialist Republic of Albania (Tirana)	University of Tirana	1957	Originally established in 1957 as the State University of Tirana through merging of six existing institutes of higher education.
Armenia (Yerevan)	First Republic of Armenia (Alexandropol)	Yerevan State University	1919	
Austria (Graz)	Archduchy of Austria, Holy Roman Empire (Graz)	University of Graz	1827 (originally 1585)	Founded in 1585 by Archduke Charles II of Austria. Downgraded to a lyceum 1782–1827. Restored to being a university 1827.
Austria (Innsbruck)	Archduchy of Austria, Holy Roman Empire (Innsbruck)	University of Innsbruck	1826 (originally 1669)	Established as a Jesuit school in 1562 before becoming a university in 1669. Downgraded to a lyceum 1781–1792. Restored 1792 but then closed 1810 following the Tyrolean Rebellion. Restored 1826.
Belgium (Flemish Region) (Ghent)	United Kingdom of the Netherlands (Ghent)	Ghent University	1817	Established in 1817 by William I of the Netherlands
Belgium (Wallonia) (Liège)	United Kingdom of the Netherlands (Liège)	University of Liège	1817	Established in 1817 by William I of the Netherlands
Bosnia and Herzegovina (Sarajevo)	Yugoslavia (Sarajevo)	University of Sarajevo	1949	
Bulgaria (Sofia)	Principality of Bulgaria (Sofia)	Sofia University	1904 ("higher pedagogical course" from 1888)	
Croatia (Zagreb)	Kingdom of Croatia (Habsburg) (Zagreb)	University of Zagreb	1669	History of the university began on 23 September 1669, when the Holy Roman Emperor Leopold I issued a decree granting the establishment of the Jesuit Academy of the Royal Free City of Zagreb. Decree was accepted at the Council of the Croatian Kingdom on 3 November 1671.
Czech Republic (Olomouc)	(Bohemia) Bohemian crown lands, Holy Roman Empire (Olomouc)	Palacký University	1573	Originally known as Olomouc Jesuit University.
Denmark (Copenhagen)	Denmark	Technical University of Denmark	1829	Was founded in 1829 as the College of Advanced Technology
Estonia (Tartu)	Kingdom of Sweden (Dorpat)	University of Tartu	1632 (continuous operation since 1802)	Founded as Academia Gustaviana in the then Swedish province of Livonia. It was closed by the Russian Government from 1710 to 1802.
Finland (Helsinki)	Kingdom of Sweden (Åbo)	University of Helsinki	1640	Founded as the Royal Academy of Turku (Swedish: Kungliga Akademin i Åbo). It was shut down by the Great Fire of Turku in 1827. The University of Helsinki was founded the next year, in 1828, and it started operating in 1829. The University of Helsinki sees itself as continuation of the Royal Academy of Turku.
France (Paris)	Kingdom of France (Paris)	Multiple successor institutions of the University of Paris	1896 (originally early 13th century)	Emerged around 1150 as a corporation associated with the cathedral school of Notre Dame de Paris, it was considered the second-oldest university in Europe. Officially chartered in 1200 by Philip II of France and recognised in 1215 by Pope Innocent III, it was often nicknamed after its theology collegiate institution, College of Sorbonne, founded about 1257 by Robert de Sorbon and charted by Louis IX of France. It was abolished in 1793 by the French Revolution, and was replaced by Napoleon on 1 May 1806 by the University of France system. In 1896 the Louis Liard law allowed the founding of a new University of Paris. In 1970, it split into 13 separate universities and numerous specialised institutions of higher education. In 2018, Sorbonne University was formed from the Paris-Sorbonne University (created from the faculty of humanities of the University of Paris) and Pierre and Marie Curie University (created from the faculty of science and medicine of the University of Paris).
France (Occitanie)	County of Toulouse (Toulouse)	Université fédérale de Toulouse Midi-Pyrénées	1896 (originally 1229)	Founded by papal bull in 1229 as the University of Toulouse. It closed in 1793 due to the French Revolution, and reopened in 1896. In 1969, it split into three separate universities and numerous specialised institutions of higher education. It no longer represents a single university, as it is now the collective entity which federates the universities and specialised institutions of higher education in the region.
France (Montpellier)	(Kingdom of Mallorca) Kingdom of Majorca (Montpellier)	University of Montpellier; Paul Valéry University Montpellier 3	1896 (originally 1289)	The world's oldest medicine faculty was established before 1137 and operated continuously until the French Revolution. University by papal bull in 1289. It closed in 1793 due to the French Revolution, and reopened in 1896. The university of Montpellier was officially re-organised in 1969 after a students' revolt. It was split into its successor institutions the University of Montpellier 1 (comprising the former faculties of medicine, law, and economy), Montpellier 2 (science and technology) and Montpellier 3 (social sciences, humanities and liberal arts). On 1 January 2015, the University of Montpellier 1 and the University of Montpellier 2 merged to form the newly recreated University of Montpellier. Meanwhile, the Paul Valéry University Montpellier 3 remains a separate institution.
France (Aix-en-Provence, Marseille)	County of Provence, Holy Roman Empire (Aix)	Aix-Marseille University	1896 (originally 1409)	Founded in 1409 as the University of Provence, and in 1792, dissolved, along with twenty-one other universities. In 1896 it was reformed as the University of Aix-Marseille, one of 17 self-governing regional universities financed by the state. In 1968 it was divided into two institutions, the University of Provence (Aix-Marseille I) as a school of languages and letters, and the University of Aix-Marseille (Aix-Marseille II) as primarily a school of medicine and sciences. In 1973 the University of Law, Economics and Science (Aix-Marseille III) was added. In 2012 the three universities merged and was renamed Aix-Marseille University.
Germany (Wittenberg; Halle)	Holy Roman Empire (Wittenberg)	Martin Luther University of Halle-Wittenberg	1502	Established in 1502 as the University of Wittenberg. Merged with University of Halle (founded 1691) in 1817.
Georgia (Tbilisi)	Democratic Republic of Georgia (Tbilisi)	Tbilisi State University	1918	Founded in 1918 as Tbilisi State University
Gibraltar		University of Gibraltar	2015	
Greece (Athens)	Kingdom of Greece (Athens)	National and Kapodistrian University of Athens	1837	
Hungary (Budapest)	Kingdom of Hungary (Nagyszombat)	Eötvös Loránd University	1635	Founded in 1635 by the archbishop and theologian Péter Pázmány as the University of Nagyszombat, it was renamed the Royal Hungarian University of Sciences in 1769. The university was moved to Buda (today part of Budapest) in 1777. The university relocated to its final location in Pest (now also part of Budapest) in 1784 and was renamed Royal University of Pest. Since then, the institution has undergone three name changes: it became the University of Budapest (1873–1921), followed by the Hungarian Royal Pázmány Péter University (1921–1950). Finally, in 1950–1951, the Faculties of Medicine and Theology became independent institutions, and the university adopted its present name, Eötvös Loránd University. Other medieval universities founded before 1500 that did not retain continuous operation include the University of Pécs (1367), which ceased functioning in the late 14th century.
Iceland (Reykjavík)	Denmark (Reykjavík)	University of Iceland	1911	
Ireland (Dublin)	Kingdom of Ireland (Dublin)	University of Dublin	1592	Founded by Queen Elizabeth I and modelled after the collegiate universities of Oxford and Cambridge. Only one college was ever established, Trinity College Dublin, making the two designations effectively synonymous.
Italy (Urbino)	Kingdom of Italy, Holy Roman Empire (Urbino)	University of Urbino	1506	
Kosovo (Pristina)	Yugoslavia (Pristina)	University of Pristina	1969	
Latvia (Riga)	Russian Empire (Riga)	Riga Technical University	1862	First established as Riga Polytechnicum in 1862
Liechtenstein (Vaduz)		University of Liechtenstein	1961	Successor to the Abendtechnikum Vaduz in 1992
Lithuania (Vilnius)	Grand Duchy of Lithuania; Polish-Lithuanian Commonwealth (Vilnius)	Vilnius University	1579 (continuous operation since 1919)	Founded as the Jesuit Academy of Vilnius; the university was closed in 1832–1919 and again in 1943–44
Luxembourg (Esch-sur-Alzette)		University of Luxembourg	2003	
Malta (Msida)	(Sovereign Military Order of Malta) Hospitaller Malta (Valletta)	University of Malta	1769	First established as the Collegium Melitense by the Jesuits in 1592
Netherlands (Leiden)	Dutch Republic (Leiden)	Leiden University	1575	Although formally still part of the Habsburg Netherlands, Leiden sided with the Dutch Revolt in 1572
North Macedonia (Skopje)	Socialist Federal Republic of Yugoslavia (Skopje)	Ss. Cyril and Methodius University of Skopje	1946	
Norway (Oslo)	Denmark–Norway (Christiania)	University of Oslo	1811	Founded as The Royal Frederik's University
Poland (Wrocław)	(Bohemia) Bohemian crown lands, Holy Roman Empire (Breslau)	University of Wrocław	1702	Founded in 1702 by Leopold I, Holy Roman Emperor as the university Leopoldina. It has been renamed five times since then: Universitas Literarum Vratislaviensis in 1742 by King Frederick II of Prussia, Silesian Friedrich Wilhelm University in Breslau in 1811, University of Breslau in the second half of the 19th century, Bolesław Bierut university between 1952 and 1989, and since 1989, University of Wrocław.
Poland (Warsaw)	Kingdom of Poland, Russian Empire	University of Warsaw	1816	Founded as a Royal University on 19 November 1816, when the Partitions of Poland separated Warsaw from the older University of Kraków (founded in 1364).
Portugal (Porto)	Kingdom of Portugal (Porto)	University of Porto	1836 (university 1911)	First established as Polytechnic University of Porto and Medical-Surgical School of Porto since 1836
Portugal (Lisbon)	Portuguese Republic (Lisbon)	University of Lisbon	1911	Successor to the Lisbon General Study, 1290
Romania (Iași)	United Principalities (Iași)	Alexandru Ioan Cuza University	1860	Successor to the Princely Academy from Iaşi, 1642, and Academia Mihăileană, 1835
Russia (Moscow)	Russian Empire (Moscow)	Moscow State University	1755	Founded in 1755 as Imperial Moscow University
San Marino (City of San Marino)		University of the Republic of San Marino	1985	
Serbia (Belgrade)	Revolutionary Serbia (Belgrade)	University of Belgrade	1808	Founded in 1808 as the Belgrade Higher School, by 1838 it merged with the Kragujevac-based departments into a single university, under current name from 1905; Orthodox Christian Lyceum in 1794; Teacher's college in 1778.
Czech Republic (Brno)	Czechoslovakia (Brno)	Masaryk University	1919	
Slovakia (Bratislava)	Czechoslovakia (Bratislava)	Comenius University	1919	
Slovenia (Ljubljana)	Kingdom of Serbs, Croats and Slovenes (Ljubljana)	University of Ljubljana	1919	
Spain (Seville)	Spanish Empire (Seville)	University of Seville	1505	
Kingdom of Sweden (Lund)		Lund University	1666	A Franciscan Studium Generale was founded in Lund in 1425, as the first university in Northern Europe, but as a result of the Protestant Reformation the operations of the catholic university were suspended.
Switzerland (Lausanne)	Old Swiss Confederacy (Lausanne)	University of Lausanne	1537	
Switzerland (Zürich)	Swiss Confederation	University of Zurich	1833 (incorporating colleges dating to 1525)	University established in 1833, taking in the Carolinum theology college, dating to 1525, and colleges of law and medicine.
Turkey (Istanbul)	Ottoman Empire (Constantinople)	Istanbul Technical University	1928 (as university; school 1773)	Founded in 1773 as Imperial School of Naval Engineering by the Ottoman Sultan Mustafa III, but became a state university in 1928.
Turkey (Istanbul)	Ottoman Empire (Constantinople)	Istanbul University	1933 (as university; madrasa 1453)	Its ultimate origins lie in a madrasa and institute of higher education founded by the Ottoman Sultan Mehmed II in 1453; was reformed to a Western style of education with multiple faculties of sciences in 1846; gained university status in 1933.
Ukraine (Kharkiv)	Russian Empire (Kharkiv)	V. N. Karazin Kharkiv National University	1804	
United Kingdom (Scotland) (Edinburgh)	Kingdom of Scotland (Edinburgh)	University of Edinburgh	1582–3	Formally established as the Tounis College (Town's College) under the authority of a royal charter granted to the Town of Edinburgh by King James VI of Scotland on 14 April 1582. It opened its doors to students in October 1583.
United Kingdom (England, Wales and Northern Ireland) (Durham)	United Kingdom of Great Britain and Ireland	Durham University	1832	Third-oldest university in England following accepted historical practice, and listed by Rüegg in A History of the University in Europe as meeting standard criteria for a university from 1832. Established under the authority of the University of Durham Act 1832. Recognised as a university in the Municipal Corporations Act 1835 and the Established Church Act 1836. Incorporated and confirmed by royal charter in 1837 and degrees granted equal privileges with those of Oxford and Cambridge by the Attorneys and Solicitors Act 1837.

=== South America ===
Location		Current name	Year	Notes
Current	Original	Current name	Year	Notes
Argentina	Spain (Peru) (Río de la Plata) (Córdoba)	National University of Córdoba	1613	It is the third-oldest university in the Americas and oldest university in Argentina.
Bolivia	Spain (Peru) (Charcas) (La Plata)	University of Saint Francis Xavier	1624	Founded in 1624 by order of King Philip IV, and with the support of Pope Innocent XII. Full name is The Royal and Pontificial Major University of Saint Francis Xavier of Chuquisaca
Brazil		Federal University of Rio de Janeiro	1920 (precursors trace back to 1792)	Created in 1920 as University of Rio de Janeiro. Has precursors the Polytechnic School (founded as Royal Academy of Artillery, Fortification and Design in 1792), the National College of Medicine (founded as Academy of Medicine and Surgery in 1808) and by the National College of Law (founded in 1891).
Chile		Universidad de Chile	1842	Successor to the Real Universidad de San Felipe, created in 1738. Oldest university in Chile.
Colombia	Spain (Peru) (New Granada) (Santa Fe de Bogotá)	Saint Thomas Aquinas University	1580	Founded in 1580 by the Dominican Order. It is the second-oldest university in the Americas.
Ecuador	Republic of Colombia (Gran Colombia) (Quito)	Central University of Ecuador	1826	
Guyana	British Guiana	University of Guyana	1963	
Paraguay		Universidad Nacional de Asunción	1889	
Peru	Spain (Peru) (Peru) (Lima)	National University of San Marcos	1551	Also known as the "Dean university of the Americas"; It is the first officially established (privilege by Charles V, Holy Roman Emperor) and the longest continuously operating university in the Americas.
Suriname	Kingdom of the Netherlands	Anton de Kom University	1968	
Uruguay		Universidad de la República	1849	
Venezuela	Spain (Peru) (Venezuela) (Caracas)	Central University of Venezuela	1721	

=== North America ===
In the United States, the colonial colleges awarded degrees from their foundation, but none were formally named as universities prior to the American Revolution, leading to various claims to be the first university in the United States. The earliest Canadian institutions were founded as colleges, without degree awarding powers, and gained degree granting authority and university status later.

Location		Current name	Year	Notes
Current	Original	Current name	Year	Notes
Anguilla; Antigua and Barbuda; Bahamas; Barbados; Belize; British Virgin Islands; Cayman Islands; Dominica; Grenada; Jamaica; Montserrat; St. Kitts and Nevis; St. Lucia; St. Vincent and the Grenadines; Trinidad and Tobago; Turks and Caicos	Jamaica (Kingston)	University of the West Indies	1948 (as affiliated college of the University of London; university 1962)	First campus opened in Jamaica as the University College of the West Indies associated with the University of London in 1948. Gained independent university status in 1962.
Belize	Belize	University of Belize	2000	
Bermuda		University of the West Indies	2009 (Bermudian membership)	First campus opened in Jamaica as the University College of the West Indies associated with the University of London in 1948. Gained independent university status in 1962. Bermuda joined the university in 2009. Bermuda has also had a community college, Bermuda College, since 1974.
Canada (Halifax, Nova Scotia)	(United Kingdom) Nova Scotia (Windsor)	University of King's College	1802 (as university; collegiate school 1789)	Following the American Revolution, Loyalists who had fled to Windsor, Nova Scotia, established the King's Collegiate School in 1789. It received a royal charter in 1802 establishing it (using the same language as in the charter of Trinity College Dublin) as "The Mother of a University", making it the oldest chartered university in Canada. A fire destroyed the original university in 1920, and the institution relocated to Halifax. Claims of links between this King's College and King's College in New York City, with which some of the early staff had been associated, were not made before the 20th century.
Costa Rica		University of Costa Rica	1940	The first institution dedicated to higher education in Costa Rica was the University of Saint Thomas (Universidad de Santo Tomás), which was established in 1843. That institution maintained close ties with the Catholic Church and was closed in 1888 by the progressive and anti-clerical government of President Bernardo Soto Alfaro as part of a campaign to modernize public education. The schools of law, agronomy, fine arts, and pharmacy continued to operate independently. In 1940, those four schools were re-united to establish the modern UCR, during the reformist administration of President Rafael Ángel Calderón Guardia.
Cuba	Spain (New Spain) (Cuba) (Havana)	Universidad de La Habana	1728	
Dominica		Ross University School of Medicine	1978	
Dominican Republic		Universidad Autónoma de Santo Domingo	1914	Successor to the Universidad Santo Tomás de Aquino (founded by papal bull in 1538, royal charter in 1558) which closed in 1823.
El Salvador	El Salvador	Universidad de El Salvador	1841	Founded on 16 February 1841 by President Juan Lindo.
Greenland (Nuuk)	Greenland (Nuuk)	University of Greenland	1989 (as university; college 1983)	Established 1983, took name University of Greenland 1987, formal university status by legislation since 1 September 1989.
Grenada		St. George's University	1976	
Guatemala	Spain (New Spain) (Guatemala) (Guatemala)	Universidad de San Carlos de Guatemala	1676 (as colegio in 1562)	The San Carlos University was the fourth university founded in the Americas, when Guatemala was part of the Viceroyalty of New Spain. It had five major transformations but never ceased teaching. It grew out of the Colegio de Santo Tomas de Aquino (a high school), founded in 1562 by Bishop Francisco Marroquín. The university's founder was King Charles II of Spain and it was consecrated by Pope Innocent XI in 1687. Activities were interrupted after the Act of Independence of Central America in 1821.
Haiti		State University of Haiti	1944	School of Law established 1860; School of Medicine 1861; Faculty of Science 1902. These were united in the University of Haiti, established 1944, which became the State University of Haiti in 1960.
Honduras		Universidad Nacional Autónoma de Honduras	1847	
Mexico		Universidad Nacional Autónoma de México	1910	Traces its origins back to Real y Pontificia Universidad de México (1551–1865) but no institutional continuity.
Mexico		Universidad Michoacana de San Nicolás de Hidalgo	1540 (as college; university 1917)	Founded in 1540 as Colegio de San Nicolás Obispo (St. Nicholas Bishop College) and later in 1543 was appointed Real Colegio de San Nicolás Obispo (Royal St. Nicholas Bishop College) by King Carlos I of Spain; it was converted into a university on 15 October 1917.
Panama		Universidad de Panamá	1935	
Puerto Rico		University of Puerto Rico, Rio Piedras	1903	Original campus of the University of Puerto Rico
(France) Saint Pierre and Miquelon		Institut Frecker	1975 (part of Memorial University of Newfoundland)	
United States (Cambridge, Massachusetts)	Massachusetts Bay Colony	Harvard University	1636	Founded in 1636, named Harvard College in 1639, chartered in 1650. Oldest institution of higher education in the United States. Officially recognised as a university by the Massachusetts Constitution of 1780.
United States (Philadelphia, Pennsylvania)	Province of Pennsylvania	University of Pennsylvania	1755	Traces its roots to a charity school founded in 1740. Collegiate charter 1755. Claims to be "the first American institution of higher education to be named a university" (in 1779).
United States Virgin Islands		University of the Virgin Islands	1967 (degree awarding; college 1962; university 1986)	Established by act of legislature in 1962. Opened in 1963 as the College of the Virgin Islands, offering only associate degrees. First bachelor's degree programmes 1967. Became the University of the Virgin Islands in 1986.

=== Oceania ===
Location		Current name	Year	Notes
Current	Original	Current name	Year	Notes
Australia (New South Wales)	New South Wales	University of Sydney	1850	Oldest in New South Wales, Australia and Oceania.
Cook Islands; Fiji; Kiribati; Marshall Islands; Nauru; Niue; Samoa; Solomon Islands; Tokelau; Tonga; Tuvalu; Vanuatu	Colony of Fiji	University of the South Pacific	1968	Regional university, operating in (and owned by the governments of) 12 Pacific island nations. Main campus in Fiji.
Guam	Trust Territory of the Pacific Islands	University of Guam	1965 (degree granting; college 1952; university 1968)	
Papua New Guinea	Papua New Guinea	University of Papua New Guinea	1965	First university in Papua New Guinea.
New Zealand (Otago)	New Zealand (Dunedin)	University of Otago	1869	Oldest in New Zealand.

== See also ==
- List of Islamic seminaries § List of oldest Islamic seminaries
- List of medieval universities
- List of oldest institutions in continuous operation
