= Njabulo Ndebele =

South African academic and writer (born 1948)

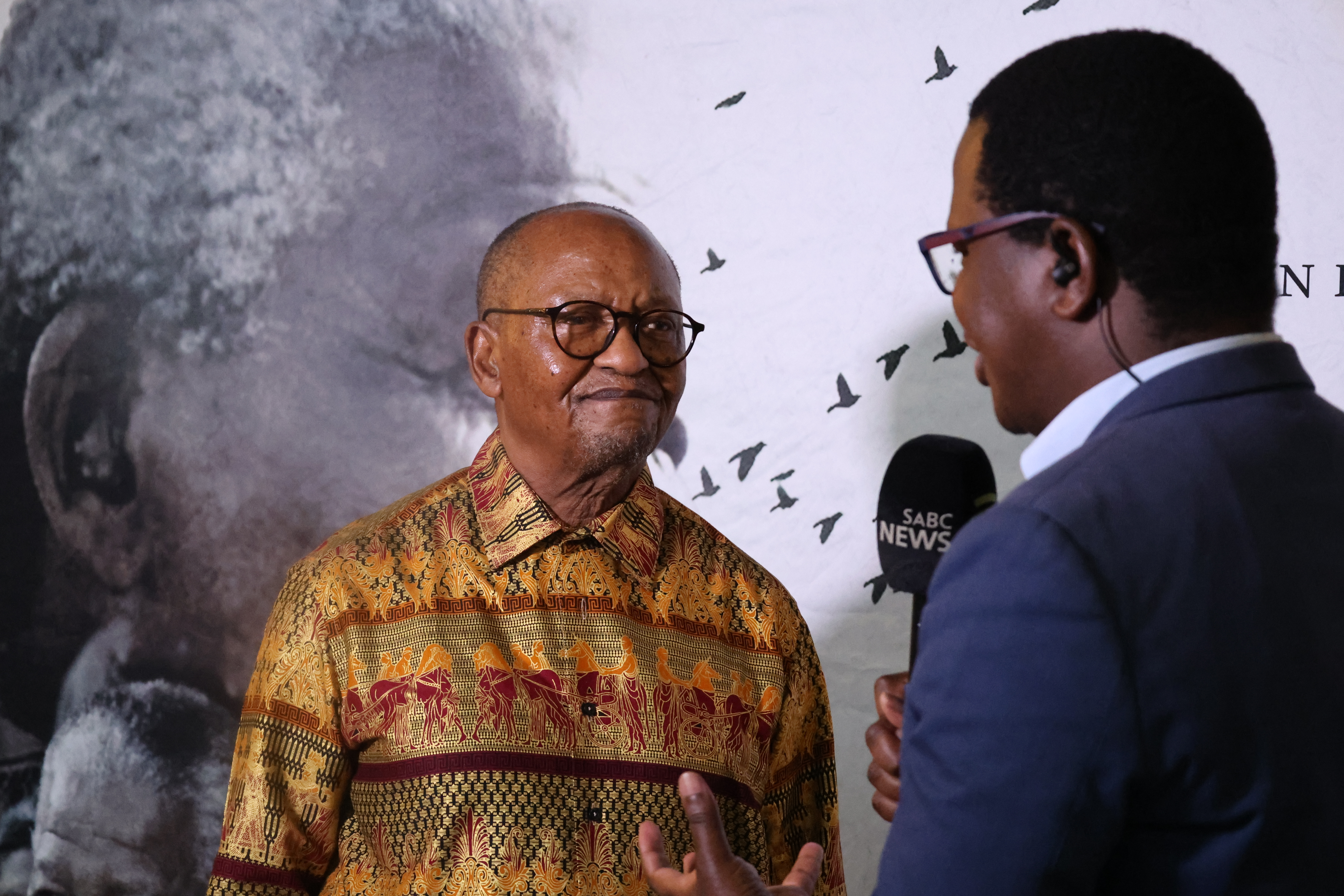
- 21st Nelson Mandela Annual Lecture
- Born: Njabulo Simakahle Ndebele; 4 July 1948 (age 78); Johannesburg, South Africa
- Education: University of Botswana, Lesotho, and Swaziland; University of Cambridge; University of Denver
- Occupations: Academic, writer
- Website: njabulondebele.co.za

Njabulo Simakahle Ndebele (born 4 July 1948) is a South African academic and writer of fiction who is the former vice-chancellor and principal of the University of Cape Town (UCT). On 16 November 2012, he was inaugurated as the chancellor of the University of Johannesburg.

He served on the board of the Nelson Mandela Foundation from its establishment in 2003, and as its chairperson for more than a decade, until his retirement, handing over the position in 2024 to Naledi Pandor.

== Life and career ==
Ndebele's father was Nimrod Njabulo Ndebele and his mother was Makhosazana Regina Tshabangu. He married Mpho Kathleen Malebo on 30 July 1971. They have one son and two daughters. Ndebele was awarded a Bachelor of Arts in English and philosophy by the University of Botswana, Lesotho, and Swaziland in 1973; a Master of Arts in English literature by the University of Cambridge in 1975; and a Doctor of Philosophy in creative writing by the University of Denver in 1983. He also studied at Churchill College, University of Cambridge, where he was the first recipient of the South African Bursary.

Njabulo Ndebele was vice-chancellor and principal at the University of Cape Town from July 2000 to June 2008, following tenure as a scholar in residence at the Ford Foundation's headquarters in New York. He joined the foundation in September 1998, immediately after a five-year term of office as vice-chancellor and principal of the University of the North in Sovenga, in the then Northern Province. Previously he served as vice-rector of the University of the Western Cape. Earlier positions include chair of the Department of African Literature at the University of the Witwatersrand; and pro-vice-chancellor, Dean, and head of the English department at the National University of Lesotho.

An established novelist, Ndebele published The Cry of Winnie Mandela in 2004 to critical acclaim. An earlier publication, Fools and Other Stories, won the Noma Award, Africa's highest literary award for the best book published in Africa in 1984. His highly influential essays on South African literature and culture were published in a collection Rediscovery of the Ordinary. In 2008, he was honoured by the South African Literary Awards with the K Sello Duiker Memorial Award.

Ndebele served as president of the Congress of South African Writers from 1987 to 1997. As a public figure he is known for his incisive insights in commentaries on a range of public issues in South Africa.

Ndebele is also a key figure in South African higher education. He was chair of the South African Universities Vice-Chancellors Association from 2002 to 2005, and has served on the executive board of the Association of African Universities (AAU) since 2001. He has done public service in South Africa in the areas of broadcasting policy, school curriculum in history, and more recently as chair of a government commission on the development and use of African languages as media of instruction in South African higher education. He served as president of the AAU from 2005 to 2009 and was chair of the Southern African Regional Universities Association. He is also a fellow of UCT.

== Awards and honours ==
Ndebele holds a number of honorary doctorates from universities in the United Kingdom, Netherlands, Japan, South Africa and the United States. These include:

- 2006: The University of Cambridge awarded him an honorary doctorate in law.
- 2007: Ndebele was made an honorary fellow of Churchill College.
- 2008: The University of Michigan awarded him an honorary doctorate in law.
- 2012: Durban University of Technology conferred on Ndebele an honorary degree, Doctor of Technology in Arts and Design, "in recognition of his outstanding contributions to education, literature and public service".

== Works ==
- Fine Lines from the Box: Further Thoughts About Our Country, 2007
- The Cry of Winnie Mandela, Ayebia Clarke Publishing, 2004
- "Africans must treasure their literature", The Independent, 30 July 2002
- Umpropheti/The Prophetess, 1999
- Death of a Son, 1996
- Bonolo and the Peach Tree, 1994
- Sarah, Rings, and I, 1993
- Rediscovery of the Ordinary: Essays on South African Literature and Culture, 1991, reissued 2006
- Fools and Other Stories, Ravan Press, 1983, reissued 2006

Ndebele also contributed to Chimurenga magazine.

Academic offices
Preceded by Mamphela Ramphele	Vice-Chancellor of the University of Cape Town; 2000 – 2008	Succeeded by Max Price
