= Nunu Ntshingila-Njeke =

- Born: Soweto
- Education: University of Eswatini; Morgan State University (MBA); AAA School of Advertising Johannesburg (Diploma)
- Awards: Financial Mail's Lifetime Achievement Award (2012); AdReview Lifetime Achievement Award; Top Women in Business and Government Awards' Business Personality of the Year (2012)

Nunu Ntshingila-Njeke (born in the 1960s) is a South African businesswoman and former Regional Director at Meta (Facebook), she is also the founder of Ntinta Investments.

== Early life and education ==
Nunu was Born in Soweto, South Africa, in 1964. She pursued her education at the University of Swaziland, (now University of Eswatini) earning a Bachelor of Arts degree. She furthered her studies in the United States, obtaining a Master of Business Administration from Morgan State University in Baltimore, Maryland and a diploma in advertising from AAA School of Advertising in Johannesburg.

== Career ==
Nunu has held diverse business positions across various sectors in Africa including Technology, Brand Consultancy, Marketing, Infrastructure and Social Development. She served as Non-Executive Independent Director of Ivanhoe Mines from 2014 to 2016 and former chief communications director of Nike South Africa.

Meta Nunu served as the Regional Director for Africa at Meta (Facebook) from 2015 to 2022, she oversaw the company's operations across Africa and solidified the growth and expansion of Meta within the Africa continent. Initiatives launched during her tenure included Free Basics, a program providing free access to basic internet services in developing countries. Additionally, she introduced programs focused on digital skills development and entrepreneurship, such as the Facebook Community Accelerator.

Ogilvy & Mather Nunu held various positions at Ogilvy & Mather, a global advertising and marketing agency, from 2004 to 2012. She served as Account Director from 2004 to 2006, Business Development Director from 2006 to 2008, managing director, Ogilvy & Mather Cape Town 2008–2012. Notably, she played a key role in expanding the agency's presence in South Africa and contributing to notable campaigns for prominent brands including DStv, SABMiller, KFC, Cadbury, BP, Volkswagen and Coca-Cola.

South African Tourism Board

She served as a board member of the South African Tourism Board. During her time at the board, she was part of a panel of experts who reviewed how South African Tourism was responding to the dynamics of the national and international tourism sector.

Nunu has also served on the boards of various African companies, including Telkom, Old Mutual, Transnet, and Cape Town's Victoria & Alfred Waterfront Group.

== Recognition and awards ==
She is considered the highest-ranking black woman in the African advertising industry. In 2016, Nunu became the first woman to be inducted into the Loeries Hall of Fame in recognition for driving creativity in Africa. She was named 30 Most Powerful Women in Advertising by Business Insider in 2012 She was also named by Fortune Magazine as one of the Top 50 Most Powerful Women – International List- in 2018 and 2019. In 2019 she was listed among 100 Most Influential African Women by Avance Media.

Awards

- AdReview Lifetime Achievement Award.

Nominations

- Businesswoman of the Year Award −2003.
- Shoprite Checkers/SABC Woman of the Year Award −2004.
