= Climate and Development Knowledge Network =

Network for Climate knowledge and development

- Formation: 2010
- Type: Alliance: Led by SouthSouthNorth and including Fundación Futuro Latinoamericano, ICLEI - Local Governments for Sustainability, South Asia and Overseas Development Institute
- Website: cdkn.org

The Climate and Development Knowledge Network (CDKN) works to enhance the quality of life for the poorest and most vulnerable to climate change. CDKN does this by combining research, advisory services and knowledge management in support of locally owned and managed policy processes. It works in partnership with decision-makers in the public, private and non-governmental sectors nationally, regionally and globally.

CDKN is led by SouthSouthNorth in South Africa, in partnership with Fundación Futuro Latinoamericano in Ecuador, ICLEI - Local Governments for Sustainability, South Asia, in India, and the Overseas Development Institute in the UK.

CDKN works across Africa, Asia and Latin America and the Caribbean, with a focus on nine priority countries: Kenya, Ethiopia, Ghana, Bangladesh, Nepal, India, Colombia, Peru and Ecuador.

== Africa ==
=== Future Climate for Africa ===
CDKN collaborates and partners with the Future Climate for Africa programme's Capacity Development and Knowledge Exchange Unit. Future Climate for Africa (FCFA) aims to generate fundamentally new climate science focused on Africa, and to ensure that this science has an impact on human development across the continent. FCFA's goal is to reduce disruption and damage from climate change and to safeguard economic development and poverty eradication efforts over the long-term. In this way, FCFA aims to make new African infrastructure and urban and rural plans and investments more climate-resilient.

=== Climate change curriculum for Southern Africa ===
CDKN also supported seven universities from five southern African countries in a project led by the University of Cape Town, to develop a master's curriculum on climate change and sustainable development for the Southern African Regional Universities Association (SARUA).

=== Building Rwanda's capacity for climate compatible development ===
CDKN has been involved in capacity building in Rwanda through the national environment and climate change fund, FONERWA – the largest climate fund of its kind in Africa. By building capacity at national and district level to scope, develop and implement successful climate compatible development projects, the work will help support implementation of Rwanda's Green Growth & Climate Resilience Strategy and build momentum for low carbon, climate resilient economic growth in the country.

As part of continued work in Rwanda through the project, "Building resilience in Rwanda through business collaboration," a CDKN-funded research study showed that small businesses around Nyabugogo River, Gatsata and other water catchment areas in Kigali could face further losses due to flooding if no urgent actions are taken to address the problem. A survey, carried out as part of the project, looked at how small businesses in Kigali are being affected by recurrent flooding, and found that the areas experienced losses estimated at Rwf178.2 million in direct and indirect damages caused by floods.

The Minister for Disaster Management and Refugee Affairs, Seraphine Mukantabana, said the findings are part of the needed continued efforts to sustain all actions for reducing disaster risks and building disaster-resilient communities: "We have the second Economic Development and Poverty Reduction Strategy to sustain the development momentum but we know potential obstacles that could impede achievement of these goals due to increasing disaster risks and impact of climate change."

=== Impacts of climate change in Uganda ===
In 2016, CDKN produced the report an "Economic assessment of the impacts of climate change in Uganda", which was commissioned by the Government of Uganda. It aimed to provide the government with economic evidence on the current and future costs associated with climate variability and predicted climate change, and the necessary adaptation measures for different sectors at both national and local scales. This evidence is intended to help policy-makers mainstream climate change and resilience into national and sectoral policies and develop the case for investing in adaptation.

Evidence from the study has already informed Uganda's Intended Nationally Determined Contribution (INDC) to the 21st Conference of Parties (COP 21) to the United Nations Framework Convention on Climate Change (UNFCCC) in Paris, France, in late 2015.

== Asia ==
=== The Ahmedabad Heat Action Plan ===
After a heat wave hit Ahmedabad, a western city of 5.5 million people, in May 2010, killing over 1,300 people, local authorities mapped areas with "high-risk" populations including slums, as part of an extreme heat action plan. CDKN supported the creation and roll-out of the action plan.

The project built up public awareness of the risks of high temperatures and set up "cooling spaces" in temples, public buildings and malls in the summer months.

The plan also involved community outreach initiatives, putting an early warning system in place that provides a seven-day advance forecast about high temperatures and impending heat waves, and capacity-building of health-case professionals to treat people with heat-related complications. According to The Hindu, the city's Heat Action Plan, unveiled in 2013, has brought down heatwave-linked deaths by up to 25%.

Women and young people at the forefront of climate adaptation action. The Ahmedabad heat wave project shows that women hawkers and street vendors are natural and easy brokers of learning around how to deal with heat wave. They pick up measures to respond as well as pass on the message to other women and children in the city.

=== Enhancing upstream-downstream cooperation and equitable water access in Nepal ===
In Nepal, CDKN through this project directly responds to expressed demand from water user groups, municipal governments, and national government about growing contestation with upstream communities, and have requested design interventions to ensure sustainable water flow. This project draws from over five years of research and local engagement on the interrelation of water, urbanization, and climate change in three rapidly urbanizing cities experiencing water stress carried by Southasia Institute of Advanced Studies. It also seeks to contribute to climate adaptive and inclusive water governance by catalyzing evidence and encouraging informed decision-making processes at local, provincial, and federal levels of government. In doing so, it seeks to enhance institutional mechanisms for cooperation and equitable water access.

=== Scaling up climate smart agriculture ===
In Nepal, the CDKN project "Scaling Up Climate Smart Agriculture (CSA) in Nepal", is developing portfolios of targeted climate-smart agricultural technologies and practices for benefitting women and marginalised farmers of the three agro-ecological zones of Nepal.

=== Pakistan's renewable energy potential ===
Another CDKN project found that the use of photovoltaic panels in an industrial sector in Sialkot, Pakistan, could mitigate up to 377,000 tons of carbon dioxide and gain average savings of US$27,400 per year on electricity costs. The project, conducted alongside Ecofys, assessed a Nationally Appropriate Mitigation Action (NAMA) as a policy tool to provide renewable energy to the city's industry.

== Latin America and the Caribbean ==
=== Cities Footprint Project ===
In Latin America and the Caribbean, CDKN is working alongside municipal governments to orientate the growth of their cities towards low carbon and climate resilient development through the Cities Footprint Project. In its first phase, Cities Footprints has been implemented in three cities: La Paz in Bolivia, Quito in Ecuador and Lima in Perú.

The project focuses on assessing the carbon and water footprints of each municipal government and of each participating city, and on promoting [greenhouse gas emissions] reductions and water management measures that contribute to climate change mitigation and adaptation respectively.

=== Resilient Cities Initiative on Climate Change in Latin America and the Caribbean ===
A joint initiative between the International Development Research Centre (IDRC) and CDKN, the Resilient Cities Initiative, helps strengthen decision-making and scale-up effective action on climate resilient development to improve the livelihoods of those most affected by climate change in Latin America. According to IDRC, the projects are:

- "Home" as a catalyst for resilience: relocation in the Amazon Rainforest. This project investigates how new settlements can be designed to be resilient to climate change, create social cohesion, and promote alternative livelihood opportunities, with a focus on Nuevo Belen in Iquitos, Peru.
- A participatory decision-making approach towards climate-resilient and inclusive urban development in Latin America. This project will develop and apply a practical, innovative, and participatory methodology and toolbox to support climate resilient, inclusive urban development in the rapidly growing cities of Latin America, with a focus on Santa Ana, El Salvador, Dos Quebradas, Colombia, and Santo Tome, Argentina.
- Triangle city cooperation: building joint climate resilient development in the Panama basin. This project investigates how city authorities and communities can work together to tackle climate related impacts at the meeting point of three countries: Paraguay, Brazil, and Argentina.
- Building urban-rural linkages for food-secure and climate-resilient medium-sized cities in the Andes. This project will examine the contribution of alternative food systems to improving food security and responding to climate change in the cities of Pasto and Popayan, Colombia.
- Strengthening climate-resilient development in urban-rural landscapes using a Water-Energy-Food Nexus approach. This project will focus on the Amazonian city of Tarapoto and the surrounding region and will generate evidence on the interdependencies and trade-offs between natural resource availability and demands on water, energy, and food across different users.
- Effects of booms and busts and climate disturbances on livelihoods and resilience of small Amazon delta cities. This project will chart the history of economic misfortunes and climate variability and change in small Amazon delta cities.

== Negotiations support ==
CDKN's Negotiations Support programme provides legal and technical support to negotiators from the most climate vulnerable countries. These countries have the most to lose from climate change but are often unable to fully represent their interests in international climate negotiations. The Negotiations Support programme won the International category at the Management Consulting Association Awards for the negotiation support work around the Paris Climate Agreement.

== Legal Response Initiative ==
CDKN funds and supports the Legal Response Initiative (LRI), which seeks to create a more level playing field between actors in the climate change negotiations.

The Legal Response Initiative provides free legal support to poor and particularly climate vulnerable developing countries, and civil society observer organisations, at international negotiations under the United Nations Framework Convention on Climate Change (UNFCCC). It operates through a network of lawyers from law firms, barrister chambers and universities in different jurisdictions who give hands-on assistance during meetings, draft legal opinions or build the capacity of lawyers and negotiators from developing countries.

The Legal Response Initiative won 'Best Education Initiative' at the Climate Week Awards in 2014 and 2017.

== CDKN book: Mainstreaming climate compatible development ==
In 2015, CDKN launched a digital book, Mainstreaming Climate Compatible Development, which provides insights and lessons learned from practical experience in increasing climate resilience in developing countries. It informs and supports decision makers, development planners and practitioners working to address climate change by sharing practical approaches to address key challenges of climate compatible development.

== Partnerships ==
In 2015, CDKN became the co-secretariat of the Low Emission Development Strategies Global Partnership (LEDS GP) alongside the National Renewable Energy Laboratory (NREL).

CDKN is also an active member of the Climate Technology Centre and Network, the Green Growth Knowledge Platform and the Climate Knowledge Brokers Group.
