= Kgomotso Moahi =

Botswana academic (born 1959)

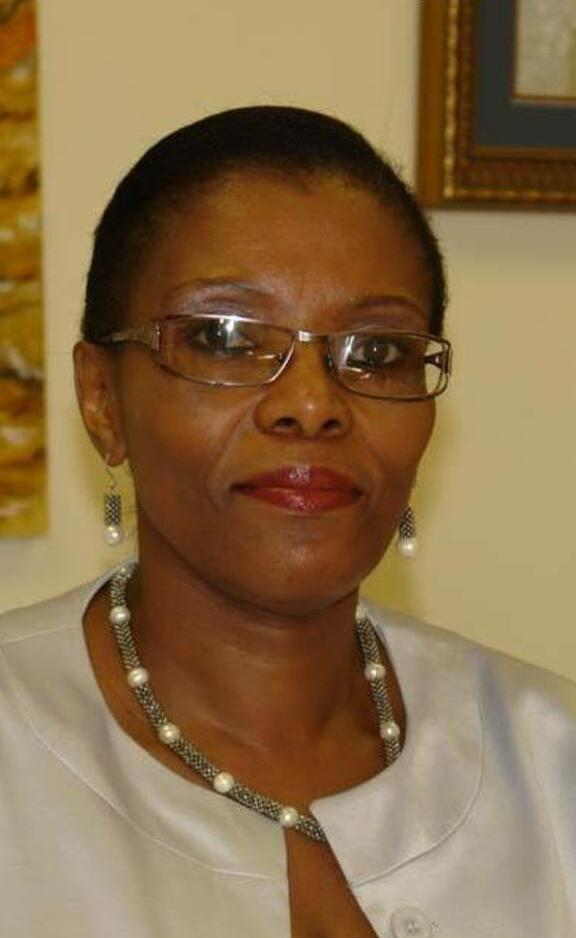
- Born: 1959 (age 66–67); Springs, South Africa
- Education: University of Botswana and Swaziland (Bachelor of Arts in politics & public administration); University of Botswana (Master of Science in information studies); University of Pittsburgh (Doctor of Philosophy in library & information sciences)
- Occupations: Academic & academic administrator
- Years active: 2002–present
- Title: Vice Chancellor- Botswana Open University

Kgomotso Hildegard Moahi, is an academic and academic administrator in Botswana, who serves as a full professor and deputy vice chancellor – student services at the Botswana Open University. She has previously served in the Department of Library and Information Studies, at the University of Botswana, the country's largest public university as the chair of the department of information studies, dean of the Faculty of Humanities and as member of the Council of the University of Botswana. For a period of nine months in 2017, Moahi served as the acting vice chancellor of the university.

== Background ==
She has represented the university in her professional service by participating in a number of initiatives aimed at encouraging the use of Information Communication Technology (ICT) for development such as the development of an ICT policy for Botswana (MAITLAMO) in 2004. She was co-chair of the health commission in the 2nd World Information Technology Forum (WITFOR) conference that took place in Gaborone in 2005.

=== Personal life ===
Moahi was born in Springs, South Africa circa 1959, to Ben Marengwa, a South African-born geologist and Mrs. Marengwa. She is their eldest daughter among the five children they had together. The parents, who were Pan African Congress (PAC) activists, fled to escape harassment by apartheid South Africa. She is married to Lucky Tebalebo Moahi, and they have been blessed with three children, Refilwe Motsetselele, Neo Wandile, and Kaelo Sabelo.

== Education ==
After attending local elementary and secondary schools, she was admitted to the University of Botswana and Swaziland in 1977. She spent the first two years in a pre-entry science program, before switching and pursuing a Bachelor of Arts degree in political science and public administration. She graduated in 1982.

Later, she pursued a Master of Science degree in information studies, at the University of Botswana. Her Doctor of Philosophy degree in library and information sciences was awarded in 2000, by the University of Pittsburgh, in the United States.

== Career ==
After her first degree, she returned to Lobatse and was hired by the Botswana Meat Commission as a trainee computer programmer. She worked in the company's data processing department for three years.

In 1985, she took up employment with the University of Botswana National Institute of Research as a data administrator. The job required her to computerize the university's documentation. Many university staff members, both academic and non-academic, needed to be trained to use the computer. She served in that role until 1993. Moahi was then appointed lecturer, in the department of library and information studies at the university.

Following the completion of her doctoral degree, she was appointed head of department, serving in that capacity for six consecutive years. She served as the Dean of the Faculty of Humanities from 2008 to 2014, providing leadership for excellence in teaching, research, and engagement. She provided both policy and academic leadership of the Faculty and during her tenure, oversaw development of new academic programs, and expanding academic partnerships. She became chairperson/convener of the university's Committee of Deans. Also in 2008, she was appointed associate professor. In 2019 she was appointed full professor, making her the first-ever Motswana woman to be promoted to this rank in the Department of Library and Information Studies. In March 2020, during the occasion of the International Women's Day, she was recognized for this achievement by the Botswana Library Association.

== Publications ==
She has published 2 edited books, 14 book chapters, and 28 refereed journal papers, 17 conference papers, she has presented 26 conference /workshop papers at various meetings locally and abroad.

- Moahi, K.H. ( 1997) Electronic networking in Africa – bridging the gap: Healthnet in Botswana. Science, Technology and Development, 15(2 and 3), 303–309.
- Moahi K.H. and Lekau, A.A. ( 2005) The provision of sexual and reproductive health services, including HIV/AIDS information, to the youth in Botswana. A presentation of preliminary findings of an ongoing study at the World Library and Information Congress 2005, 14–18 August 2005, Oslo, Norway
- Moahi H.(2009) ICT and Health Information in Botswana: towards the Millennium Development Goals First Published August 14, 2009, Research Article https://doi.org/10.1177/0266666909340790
- Moahi K.H (2018) Healthcare Policy and Reform: Concepts, Methodologies, Tools, and Applications
- Moahi K H (2020) The Research Process and Indigenous Epistemologies: Handbook of Research on Connecting Research Methods for Information Science Research
- Moahi.K H (2019) A Framework for Advocacy, Outreach and Public Programming in Public Libraries in Africa: Handbook of Research on Advocacy, Promotion, and Public Programming for Memory Institutions
- Moahi. K H (2016) E-Government Development in Botswana: The Role of Libraries:: International Business: Concepts, Methodologies, Tools, and Applications
- Moahi K H (2018) Big Data and Healthcare: Implications for Medical and Health Care in Low Resource Countries
