= University of Botswana and Swaziland =

The University of Botswana and Swaziland was the predecessor of both the University of Botswana and the University of Eswatini. It existed from October 20, 1975 when the Lesotho campus of the University of Botswana, Lesotho and Swaziland (UBLS) withdrew to form the National University of Lesotho (NUL), until June 1982 when the two universities in Botswana and Eswatini were established. The campuses of this university were in Kwaluseni and Luyengo in Eswatini and Gaborone in Botswana. Part I studies of bachelor's degree studies were undertaken in Eswatini and part II was done in Gaborone. However, law studies were done in Eswatini.

== See also ==
- List of split up universities
