= Global Climate Action Partnership =

The Global Climate Action Partnership (GCAP), formerly the Low Emissions Development Strategies Global Partnership (LEDS GP), aims to advance climate-resilient low emission development and support transitions to a low-carbon economy through coordination, information exchange and cooperation among countries and programs working to advance low-emission economic growth. The partnership was launched in 2011 and brings together more than 160 governmental and international institutions. The implementation, knowledge management, and outreach of LEDS GP is coordinated by a co-secretariat of the Climate & Development Knowledge Network (CDKN) and the National Renewable Energy Laboratory (NREL).

LEDS GP delivers support through its three regional platforms, the Africa LEDS Partnership (AfLP), the Latin America and the Caribbean Partnership (LEDS LAC) and Asia Partnership (ALP). It aims to:

- Strengthen support for low-emission climate-resilient development in all regions,
- Mobilize capacity and advance peer-to-peer learning and collaboration on low emission climate-resilient development across countries, international institutions and practitioners, and
- Improve and support coordination of low-emission climate-resilient development LEDS activities at the country, regional and global level.

== Working groups ==
LEDS GP delivers support through six technical working groups on the following topics.

- Agriculture, Forestry and Land Use (AFOLU)
- Benefits Assessment of LEDS
- Energy
- Finance
- Subnational Integration of LEDS
- Transport

== Technical assistance ==
Through its Remote Expert Assistance on LEDS (REAL) service, the LEDS GP provides virtual technical assistance to developing country government agencies or initiatives—as well as their consultants, technical institutions, and non-government organizations—working on LEDS plans and implementation.

== Fellowship program ==
In May 2016, LEDS GP announced the launch of its Fellowship Program, which aims to embed individuals or teams of practitioners in leading institutions to learn practical lessons that they can apply to low emission development strategies (LEDS) and/or Intended Nationally Determined Contributions in their home countries.
