= Patricia McFadden =

African feminist and writer (born 1952)

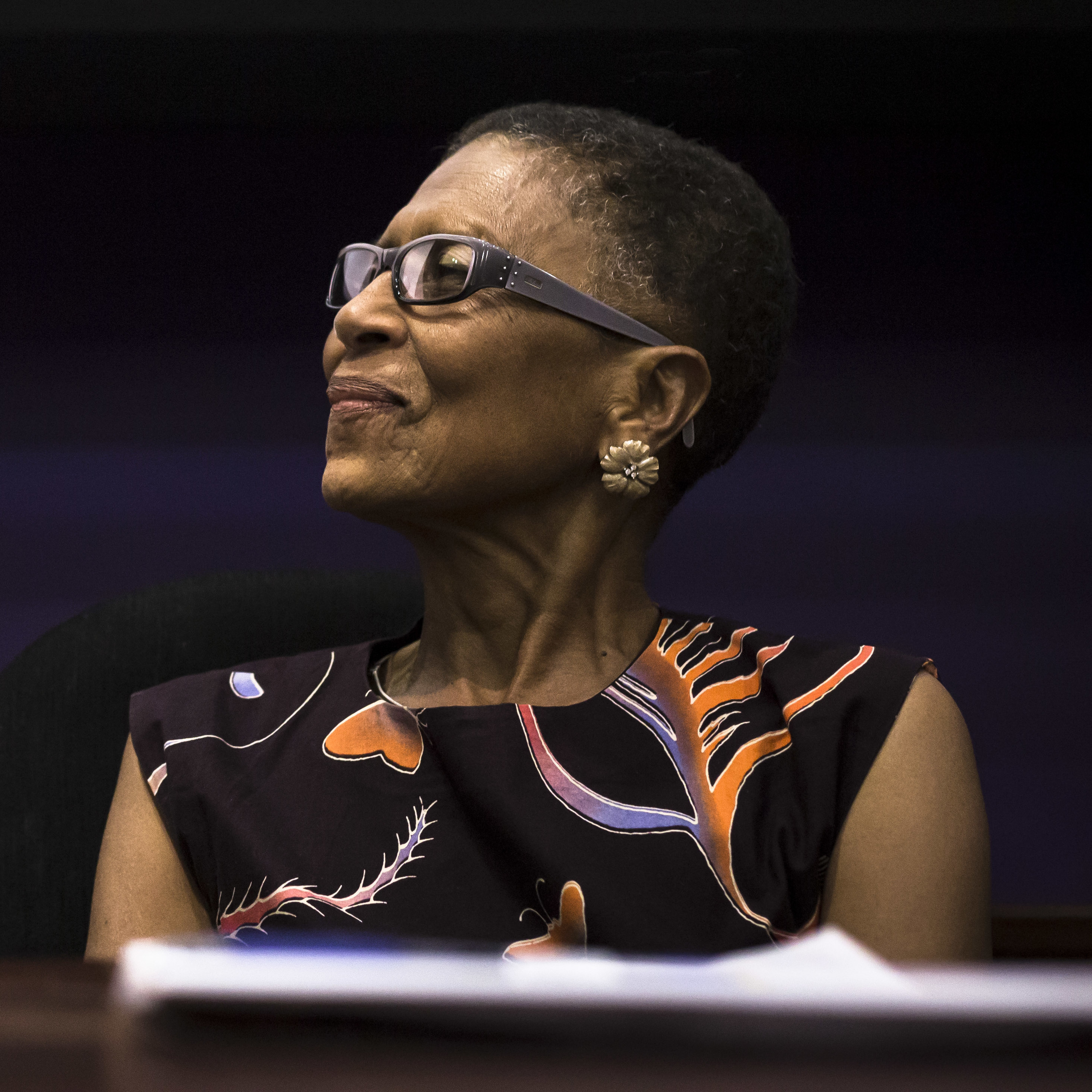
- Born: 1952 (age 73–74)
- Education: University of Botswana and Swaziland; University of Dar es Salaam; Warwick University (PhD)

Patricia McFadden (born 1952) is a radical African feminist, sociologist, writer, educator, and publisher from eSwatini. She is also an activist and scholar who worked in the anti-apartheid movement for more than 20 years. McFadden has worked in the African and global women's movements as well. As a writer, she has been the target of political persecution. She has worked as editor of the Southern African Feminist Review and African Feminist Perspectives. She currently teaches, and advocates internationally for women's issues. McFadden has served as a professor at Cornell University, Spelman College, Syracuse University and Smith College in the United States. She also works as a "feminist consultant", supporting women in creating institutionally sustainable feminist spaces within Southern Africa.

== Personal life ==
She attended the University of Botswana and Swaziland studying politics and administration, with economics and sociology as minors. She then went to the University of Dar es Salaam for a master's degree in sociology. She received her PhD from Warwick University in the United Kingdom in 1987.

== Career ==
She worked as a program officer in the Southern African Regional Institute for Policy Studies (SARIPS) in Zimbabwe, from 1993 to 2005. She worked as editor of the Southern African Feminist Review from 1995 to 2000. She served as international dean at the International Women's University (IFU) from 1998 to 2000 in Hanover. She also taught in the Masters in Social Policy (MPS) program offered by SARIPS for the past seven years. She was an adjunct professor at Syracuse University Study Abroad program in Zimbabwe and then later at the parent location in Syracuse New York as a faculty member in the Department of African American Studies.

=== Work ===
As a writer, McFadden's main areas of intellectual inquiry are: sexuality, reproductive and sexual health, and identity, violation and citizenship for African women. She has presented numerous papers at universities, conferences and seminars internationally in Norway, Sweden, Denmark, Namibia, South Africa, Ghana, Djibouti, Kenya, Uganda, Brazil, China, Germany, Ethiopia, the United Kingdom and others.

== Publications ==
=== Essays ===
- "Becoming Postcolonial: African Women Changing the Meaning of Citizenship" - 2005.
- "Challenging HIV and AIDS: Resistance and Advocacy in the Lives of Black Women in Southern Africa"
- "War Through a Feminist Lens"
- "Between a Rock and a Hard Place: Positioning Feminism in the ‘Africa Debate,’ and ‘Patriarchy'"
- "Sexuality and Globalization"

=== Books ===
- "Gender in Southern Africa: A Gendered Perspective" (Sapes Books)- 1998
- "Reflections on Gender Issues in Africa" (Sapes Books) - 1999
- "Reconceptualizing the Family in a Changing Southern African Environment" with Sara C. Mvududu (Africa Institute of South Africa), 2001.

== Awards ==
- Hellman/Hammett Human Rights Award (Human Rights Watch)- 1999
- Keynote speaker at AFEMS 2019, at University of the Witwatersrand
