= Luyengo =

Coordinates: 26.579°S 31.174°E

Luyengo is a town in western Eswatini (formerly Swaziland). It is located 35 kilometres south of the capital, Mbabane, on the MR18 highway, at the junction of the road south to Mankayane and Mgazini.

In 1881 the Usuthu Mission school was opened in Luyengo.

Luyengo was the site of the Swaziland Agricultural College, which became the Swaziland Agricultural College and University Centre (SACUC) and was incorporated into the University of Eswatini. The Main campus for the University in Eswatini was then built at Kwaluseni, and all departments except agriculture then moved to that campus. Of note at SACUC was the Cardiff Hall donated by the citizens of Cardiff (Wales) as part of their contribution to Freedom From Hunger Year. The tinkabi tractor was developed at SACUC by the then head of agricultural engineering Alan Catterick who left the University to successfully develop the tractor commercially.
