= University of East Africa =

Independent external college

Coordinates: 6.780556°S 39.203333°E

- Swahili: Chuo Kikuu cha Afrika Mashariki
- Active: 29 June 1963–1970
- Special relation: University of London

The University of East Africa was established on 29 June 1963 and served Kenya, Tanzania, and Uganda in the eastern African Great Lakes region. The university was originally instituted as an independent external college of the University of London. These universities in East Africa by then gained their right to stand as independent bodies as follows, and their popularly known name emerged:

1. Kenya: University of Nairobi
2. Uganda: Makerere University which gained its autonomy of being an independent university offering both undergraduate and postgraduates on 1 July 1970
3. Tanzania: University of Dar es Salaam. By 1963, it became an independent university after being instituted as the University of London on 25 October 1961 and many faculties started to emerged in the following years of existence.

== History ==
After funding of Makerere University college's commencement era of territorial university among the three countries of East Africa, for the next 2 decades, East Africa's university drew a joint affair policy among the authorities of Kenya, Uganda and Tanganyika(known as Tanzania after union with Zanzibar). These policies was to culminate the establishment of the regional University of East Africa (UEA) in June 1963 with university colleges in Kenya, Uganda and Tanzania.

== See also ==
- Makerere University
- University of Nairobi
- University of Dar es Salaam
