= University of Eswatini =

Public university in Eswatini

Coordinates: 26.4824°S 31.3124°E

- Motto: Umculu Sisekelo Sesive (siSwati)
- Motto in English: The Scripture is the Pillar of the Nation
- Type: Public university
- Established: 1982; 44 years ago
- Affiliations: Association of African Universities; Association of Commonwealth Universities
- Chancellor: Mswati III
- Vice-Chancellor: Justice Thwala
- Administrative staff: 298
- Students: ~7,000
- Undergraduates: ~6,700
- Postgraduates: ~300
- Location: Kwaluseni, Eswatini
- Campus: Rural
- Website: uniswa.sz

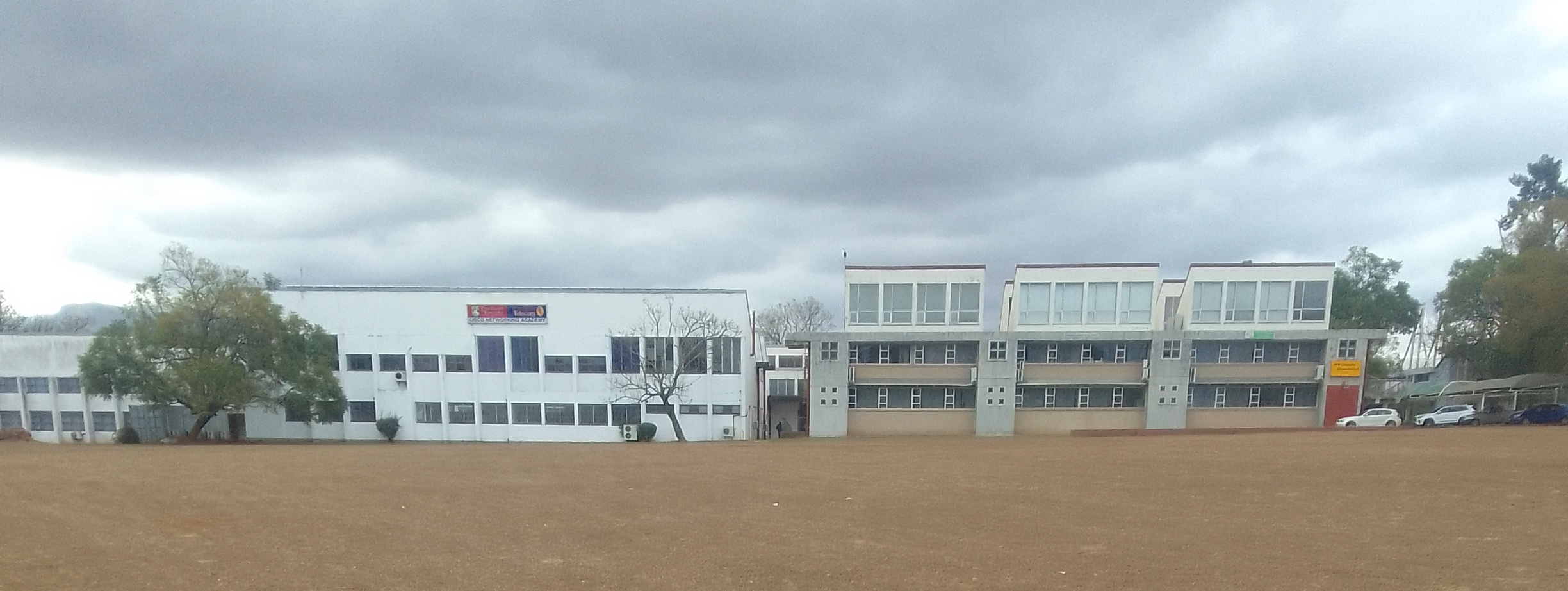
The University of Eswatini in 2024

The University of Eswatini (or UNESWA; formerly known as the University of Swaziland, or UNISWA) is the national university of Eswatini.

It was established by act of parliament in 1982. The university is developed from the University of Botswana, Lesotho and Swaziland (UBLS), formerly known as the University of Basutoland, Bechuanaland and Swaziland (UBBS), which was established in 1964. It became the University of Botswana and Swaziland when the Lesotho campus withdrew to form the National University of Lesotho on 20 October 1975, and then became an independent national university in 1982.

The university has eight (8) faculties, which are located in the three campuses of the university. These are: Kwaluseni, Luyengo and Mbabane (K, L, M). Luyengo campus houses the Agriculture and Consumer Sciences faculties, Mbabane campus is home to the faculty of Health Sciences, and Kwaluseni campus is the main campus. The University of Eswatini is mainly an undergraduate institution, offering bachelor's degrees. There are a few postgraduate programmes including two Ph.D. programmes.

The head of the university is the chancellor, who is king Mswati III. Its daily management is the responsibility of the vice chancellor, who is professor Justice Thwala. UNESWA is home to research centers and institutes. The university also publishes research periodicals such as the UNISWA Research Journal of Agriculture, Science and Technology and the UNISWA Research Journal.

== History ==
Tertiary education in Eswatini began with the establishment of the University of Basutoland, Bechuanaland and Swaziland in 1964 and continued via the University of Botswana and Swaziland between 1976 and 1982. It was only after the splitting of the latter institution in 1982 that the University of Swaziland (UNISWA) was finally established. The Swaziland Agricultural College and University Centre, which came into being in 1966, had developed independently, and it now constitutes UNESWA's Faculty of Agriculture and is situated on the Luyengo campus of the university. Main recipients of the courses offered are officers working for the Ministry of Agriculture and Education.

There are two other campuses which, like Luyengo, are situated in the Mbabane/Manzini corridor in the west-central area of the country. The main campus is at Kwaluseni, which was financed jointly by the United Kingdom, United States, Canada, the Anglo American Corporation, and the Eswatini government. The campus houses the faculties of Commerce, Education, Humanities, and Science. The Mbabane campus houses the Faculty of Health Sciences, established in 1996. Certificate, diploma and degree programmes are offered in general and specialised nursing, community mental health science and environmental health services.

Since achieving full university status in the early 1980s, UNESWA has grown in accordance with its chief mandate, which is to assist in the national development effort through manpower production. The output of teachers, nurses and agricultural experts has risen steadily, while the double-subject-major degrees on offer in both the humanities and the sciences have been designed to provide teachers with more than one speciality – an important qualification where teacher shortages are endemic.

The electronic and electrical engineering programme offered by the Faculty of Science and Engineering reflects the need to rapidly develop the science and technology expertise within the country.

== Governance and administration ==
The University of Eswatini is governed by the University Council which is appointed by the Chancellor. The Chancellor of the university is His Majesty King Mswati III. In this capacity, he confers all degrees during the University graduation ceremony. The daily management of the university is the responsibility of the Vice-Chancellor with the assistance of the Pro-Vice-Chancellor. Both are appointed by the University Council and are accountable to it. The Vice-Chancellor is professor J.M Thwala. In addition there is a University Senate which is responsible for academic authority of the university. It is chaired by the Vice-Chancellor. The Faculties of the university are run by the Deans who are also chairpersons of the respective Faculty boards. They are accountable to the University Senate. Other officers of the university are responsible for various affairs such as the Dean of Student Affairs, Registrar, Physical Planner among others.

Students are represented by the Student Representative Council (SRC) which falls under the Student Welfare Office which is run by the Dean of Student Affairs. Issues pertaining to student accommodation and residences on the campuses is the responsibility of the warden also under the Student Welfare Office.

== Campuses ==
The three campuses are within 40 kilometers of each other:

- Kwaluseni campus is the main campus, with the faculties of commerce, humanities, social science, education and science.
- Luyengo campus was formerly the Swaziland Agricultural College and University Centre (SACUC), and is the location of the faculty of agriculture and consumer sciences.
- Mbabane campus was formerly Swaziland's Institute of Health Sciences, and is the location of the university's faculty of health sciences; it includes a nursing school, a midwifery programme and the environmental studies programme.

== Academics ==
The university is divided into the faculties of Agriculture, Consumer Sciences, Health Sciences, Education, Humanities, Commerce, Science & Engineering, and Social Science. There is also the Institute of Distance Education (IDE) which is responsible for all distance education instruction. The Institute of Postgraduate Studies is responsible for postgraduate programmes at masters and doctorate level. The university is also home to the biggest library in Eswatini. The library has branches in all three campuses with the main and biggest library at Kwaluseni, the main campus.

=== Faculty of Agriculture ===
The faculty is located at the Luyengo campus which is located between Malkerns and Bhunya. The faculty houses the departments of Agriculture and Biosystem Engineering, Agricultural Economics and Management, Agricultural Education and Extension, Animal Science, Consumer Sciences, Crop Production and Horticulture. The faculty offers undergraduate degree majors in Agricultural and Biosystems Engineering, Agricultural Economics and Agribusiness Management, Agricultural Education, Agronomy, Animal Science, Animal Science (Dairy), and Horticulture.

=== Faculty of Commerce ===
The faculty is located at the main campus in Kwaluseni. It has two departments namely the Accounting and Business Administration departments and offers only undergraduate programmes. The undergraduate majors for the Bachelor of Commerce degree are in Accounting, Management and Marketing. The faculty also offers a Diploma in Commerce course.

=== Faculty of Consumer Sciences ===
The faculty is located at the Luyengo campus. The faculty is made up of the following departments:

- Consumer Science Education and Community Development (CED)
- Food and Nutrition Sciences (NFS)
- Textiles and Apparel Design (TAD)

The faculty offers degrees at undergraduate (B.Sc.) and post-graduate (M.Sc.) level.

=== Faculty of Education ===
The faculty is located at the Kwaluseni campus and has the following academic departments:

- Adult Education
- Curriculum and Teaching
- Educational Foundations and Management
- In-Service Education
- Primary Education
- Post Graduate Certificate in Education (PGCE)

The faculty offers undergraduate programmes leading to the B.Ed. degree and some departments within the Faculty also offer post-graduate programmes leading to the M.Ed. degree.

=== Faculty of Health Sciences ===
The faculty is located at the Mbabane campus of the university near the Eswatini Government Hospital. The Faculty of Health Sciences has the following academic departments:

- Community Health Nursing Science
- Environmental Health Science
- General Nursing
- Midwifery Science

The faculty offers only undergraduate programmes in nursing and environmental health.

=== Faculty of Humanities ===
The faculty has two programmes under it and six departments. The undergraduate programmes offered are:

1. The Bachelor of Arts in Journalism and Mass Communication. It has majors in, Broadcasting, Print and Public Relations & Advertising.
2. Bachelor of Arts (Humanities). It offers double major combinations and is also available through the institute of distance education.

Departments within the faculty:

1. Academic Communication Skills
2. African Languages and Literature
3. English Language and Literature
4. History
5. Journalism and Mass Communication and
6. Theology and Religious Studies.

Post Graduate:

The only graduate programme on offer is the Master of Arts in History through the institute for post-graduate studies.

=== Faculty of Science and Engineering ===
The faculty is the main centre for teaching and research in scientific and technological disciplines in Eswatini. The faculty is located in the science block in the heart of the university. The faculty is divided into the departments of Chemistry, Biology, GeographyEnvironmental Science and Planning (GEP), Physics, Electrical and Electronic Engineering, Mathematics, and Computer Science.

The undergraduate programmes offers are the (1) Bachelor of Science (B.Sc.) and (2) the Bachelor of Engineering (B.Eng.) with the latter under the Electrical and Electronic Engineering department.

The undergraduate programme usually involves double major combinations from the departments for the B.Sc. degree. Examples are double majors in Physics and Mathematics, Chemistry and Biology and Mathematics and Computer Science. The aim for the faculty was to train students with the goal of them being teachers, with some going on to study Engineering and Medicine outside the country.

The Faculty of Science offers two post-graduate courses leading to the Master of Science (M.Sc.) and these are in Chemistry (either Environmental/Analytical Chemistry or Natural Products and Medicinal Chemistry) and in Environmental Resource Management (ERM).

Research in the faculty of science is based on five themes namely, Environmental Conservation, Energy, Water Quality Management, Computational Science and Mathematical Modelling and Research in Indigenous Medicinal and Nutritious Food Plants. The faculty is home to the Institute of Research in Traditional Medicine, Medicinal and Indigenous Food Plants. Future plans of the faculty are to establish new research centres for Computational Scienceand Mathematical Modelling, Energy, Environmental Conservation and Water Quality Management.

=== Faculty of Social Sciences ===
The faculty sciences is made up of the departments of Economics, Law, Political and Administrative Studies, Sociology and Statistics and Demography. The department of Law offers the only Law programme in the university and in the country. The Bachelor of Laws ( LL.B. ) is the main undergraduate programme in the law department and a Diploma in Law is offered through the Institute of Distance Education. There is no graduate law programme. The remaining departments offer undergraduate majors leading to the Bachelor of Arts (Social Science) or famously B.A.S.S. Double major combination are common in the departments with possibility of a combination with mathematics which is offered in the Faculty of Science.

=== Institute of Distance Education ===
The IDE is the main center for distance learning at the university and in the country. It is housed at the main campus at the IDE center. With the motto To Take University Education to the People rather than the People Come to the University, it serves academic departments by offering distance learning variants of the existing programmes. IDE offers six qualifications which are: Certificate in French, Diploma in Commerce, Diploma in Law, Bachelor of Commerce, Bachelor of Arts in Humanities and Bachelor of Education in Adult Education.

=== Institute of Post-graduate Studies ===
The institute is responsible for all graduate programmes in the university. The institute currently offers a number of master's degrees and a doctorate. The master's programmes are offered in association with the departments of Adult Education, Agricultural Economics and Management, Agricultural Education and Extension, Chemistry, Crop Production, Curriculum and Teaching, Education Foundation and Management, and History. The doctoral programme offered is in Agricultural Education, under the Agricultural Education and Extension department at the Faculty of Agriculture.

== Notable alumni ==
- Patricia McFadden - Swazi author, Professor of Sociology, and African radical feminist.
- Patrice Motsepe - South African mining magnate.
- Lindiwe Sisulu - South African politician.
- Naledi Pandor - South African politician.
- Tokyo Sexwale - South African politician and Non-Executive Chairman Mvelaphanda Holdings
- Thuli Madonsela - Public Protector of South Africa
