= Southern African Regional Universities Association =

- Abbreviation: SARUA
- Formation: 2005
- Legal status: Association
- Purpose: Educational
- Headquarters: 43 Andringa Street, Eikestad Mall, 3rd Floor; Stellenbosch, South Africa
- Region served: Southern African Development Community
- Members: 66
- Official language: English/French/Portuguese

The Southern African Regional Universities Association is a regional membership association for public universities in the 15 countries of the Southern African Development Community (SADC). It was established in 2005 as a membership based association for 66 universities.

SARUA aims to assist in the general revitalization of higher education in Southern Africa and specifically to enhance and build the senior leadership capacity of SADC Higher Education institutions, enabling the sector to effectively respond to regional development challenges.

Since its inception SARUA has undertaken a number of baseline research studies in the region to investigate key higher education issues facing the public universities in Southern Africa, including size issues, funding issues, open access and science, technology and ICT. It has also hosted webinars on ‘Incentives for and barriers to societally impactful research’.

== Members ==
- Arrupe Jesuit University, Zimbabwe
- BA ISAGO University, Botswana
- Botho University, Lesotho
- Botswana International University of Science and Technology (BIUST)
- Botswana University of Agriculture and Natural Resources
- Central University of Technology, South Africa
- Eduardo Mondlane University, Mozambique
- Gwanda State University, Zimbabwe
- Harare Institute of Technology, Zimbabwe
- Instituto Superior de Gestão e Empreendedorismo Gwaza Muthini, Mozambique
- Lilongwe University of Agriculture and Natural Resources, Malawi
- Malawi University of Science and Technology
- Marondera University of Agriculture and Natural Sciences, Zimbabwe
- Mbeya University of Science and Technology, Tanzania
- Midlands State University, Zimbabwe
- Muhimbili University of Health and Allied Sciences (MUHAS), Tanzania
- Mukuba University, Tanzania
- Mzuzu University, Malawi
- National Institute of Public Administration, Zambia
- National University of Lesotho
- National University of Science and Technology, Zimbabwe
- Namibia University of Science & Technology
- Nelson Mandela African Institute of Science and Technology (NM_AIST), Tanzania
- North-West University, South Africa
- Open University of Mauritius
- Rhodes University, South Africa
- Stellenbosch University, South Africa
- Southern Africa Nazarene University, Eswatini
- The Catholic University of Zimbabwe
- The International University of Management, Namibia
- The Open University of Tanzania
- The University of Dodoma, Tanzania
- The University of Seychelles
- Tshwane University of Technology, South Africa
- University of Botswana
- Université Catholique la Sapientia de Goma, Democratic Republic of Congo
- Universidade Eduardo Mondlane, Mozambique
- University of Eswatini
- University of the Free State, South Africa
- Universidade Joaquim Chissano, Mozambique
- Universidade Katyavala Bwila, Angola
- University of Limpopo, South Africa
- Universidade de Luanda, Angola
- Universidade Lurio, Mozambique
- University of Lusaka, Zambia
- University of Malawi
- Université des Mascareignes, Mauritius
- University of Mauritius
- University of Namibia
- University of South Africa
- University of Technology, Mauritius
- University of Venda, South Africa
- University of the Western Cape, South Africa
- Universidade Zambeze, Mozambique
- University of Zambia
- Welwitchia Health Training Centre, Namibia
- Women's University in Africa, Zimbabwe
- Zimbabwe Ezekiel Guti University
- UNICAF University, Zambia

== See also ==
- Universities in Africa
