= Kwaluseni =

Coordinates: 26°29′S 31°20′E

Kwaluseni is an inkhundla of Eswatini, located in the Manzini Region. Its population as of the 2007 census was 41,780. It is divided in two imiphakatsi:

- Logoba
- Kwalusenimhlane

The Kwaluseni constituency (Inkhudla) is located in the central part of Eswatini and has an area of 28.45 square kilometers. Almost half of it is Swazi national land (communal), while almost all the title deeds are found in the Matsapha Municipality. There are four chiefdoms within the area, namely, Mbikwakhe, Kwaluseni, Mhlane, and Logoba. All the unplanned settlements are in the peri-urban area within Swazi nation land.

== Economy ==
Kwaluseni is also known as a home to the University of Eswatini main campus. There are also other tertiary institutions around the Inkhundla. There is the institute of development management (IDM) and Gwamile Voctim. There are also a number of primary and high schools (public and private), which makes Kwaluseni a hub for young and educated individuals and offers a vibrant atmosphere.

The so-called Matsapha industrial town is also located within the Kwaluseni Inkhundla. The presence of this industrial town has provided employment opportunities to the people of Eswatini and has contributed to the growth of the area. A high number of people are migrating from rural areas to the area, leading to a high population. The Matsapha town is defined in the Urban Government Act of 1969, as amended in 2012, and covers an area of approximately 2000 hectares. The area was established as an industrial paŕk in 1965 and was officially gazetted in 1969.

Matsapha started with a cardboard box factory in the 1960s. Today it's a labyrinth of factories, warehouses and offices. It is home to big hitters such as Conco, the Coca-Cola concentrate plant, and Fashion International, a garment manufacturer that employs over 1250 people. Other notable industries are Macmillan Swaziland, the country's leading publisher and supplier of school textbooks, and Swaziland Beverages, which produces local soft drinks and beers. A railway station also serves Matsapha on the Goba railway, which connects to the city of Sphofaneni to the east, and is also served by the Matsapha International Airport.

Besides the industrial town, there are a number of business places owned by people, both formal and informal businesses. There are food outlets, salons, shops, car washes, and places where one can go for fun and relaxation, to name a few.

== Population ==
Due to the presence of the educational institutions, the industrial site, and the business opportunities, Kwaluseni is now densely populated. The large number of rental rooms is increasing rapidly. Kwaluseni is now considered a peri-urban area because it exhibits characteristics of both urban and rural environments. The 2007 population and housing Census estimated a total of 60,064 (resulting in a population density of 2,104 persons per square kilometer. This represented an increase of 44% when compared to the 2007 population of 41.780. The population of the area under Swazi nation Land within Kwaluseni is estimated at 48,467, which represents just above 80% of the entire constituency population. The recent census indicated that Kwaluseni recorded the highest percentage of people aged 18 and above(70.5%). The Matsapha industrial site, as well as the Manzini and Mbabane corridors, are major magnets for migrants from outlying rural areas and other smaller towns and villages.

The rapid increase in the population and increase in rental rooms have led to a number of challenges. The main challenge is waste management. This is the main challenge because it has an effect on the environment and on the health of the residents. Waste management, by definition, is the process of collecting, transporting, processing, recycling, or disposing of waste material.

Other challenges are an increase in the crime rate and prostitution. Recently, Kwalusenti has hit the headlines in the Eswatini Observer, stating that there's a Surge in new HIV infections and that it is the hotspot for the spread of HIV in Eswatini.
