= University of Botswana, Lesotho and Swaziland =

Defunct university

The University of Botswana, Lesotho and Swaziland (UBLS) was a predecessor to the universities of the respective countries, presently the University of Botswana, the National University of Lesotho, and the University of Eswatini. The University was originally known as the University of Basutoland, Bechuanaland and Swaziland (UBBS), which had its headquarters in Lesotho between 1964 and 1975. The UBBS had developed from the Pius XII Catholic University College at Roma, which was the product of a long-held desire of the Roman Catholic hierarchy in Southern Africa for an institution of higher learning for Africans.

The UBLS awarded its first degrees in April 1967, after a transitional period during which former Pius XII College students continued to take University of South Africa degrees. The university became the University of Botswana and Swaziland (UBS) after the National University of Lesotho was established on October 20, 1975. The ultimate end of the UBS was in the 1981–1982 academic year, when the University of Swaziland and the University Botswana were established independently.

== See also ==
- List of split up universities
