= National University of Lesotho =

University in Roma, Lesotho

Coordinates: 29°27′02″S 27°43′23″E

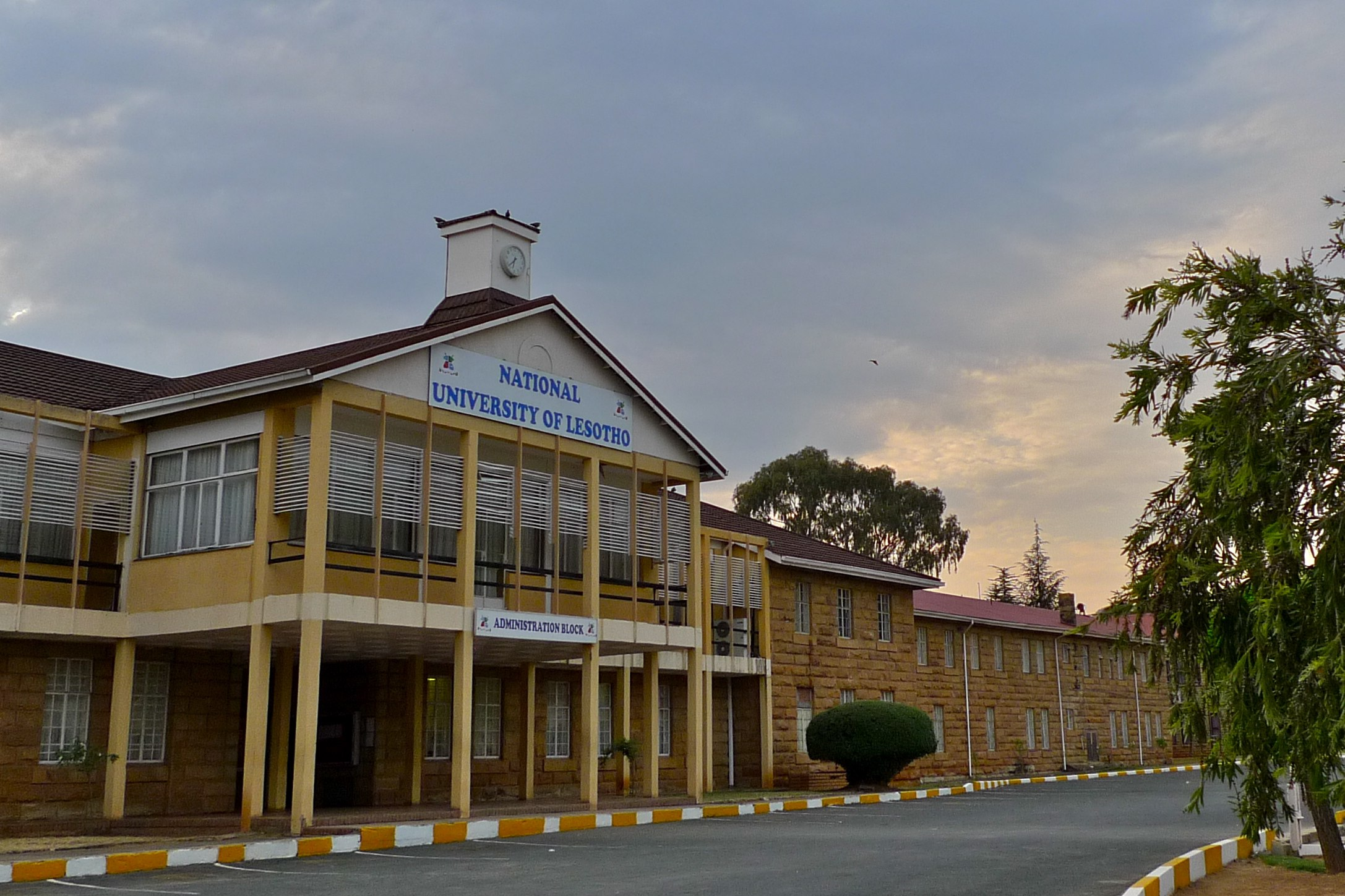
- Former names: Pius XII Catholic University College, University of Basutoland, Bechuanaland Protectorate and Swaziland, University of Botswana, Lesotho and Swaziland
- Motto: 'Nete ke Thebe
- Motto in English: Truth is a Shield
- Type: Public
- Established: 1945; 81 years ago
- Affiliations: ACU, AAU, IAU, AESAU, SARUA
- Chancellor: King Letsie III
- Vice-Chancellor: Kananelo Mosito
- Students: around 10,000
- Location: Roma, Lesotho
- Campus: 198 acres (80 ha)
- Colors: Red and white
- Nickname: Rovers
- Website: www.nul.ls

The National University of Lesotho, the main and oldest university in the country, is located in Roma, 34 km (21 mi) southeast of Maseru, the capital of Lesotho. The Roma valley is broad and is surrounded by a barrier of rugged mountains which provides magnificent scenery. The university enjoys a temperate climate with four distinct seasons. The governing body of the university is the council and academic policy is in the hands of Senate, both Council and Senate being established by the Act.

== Academics ==
Faculties and departments:

- Agriculture
- Education
- Health Sciences
- Humanities
- Law
- Science & Technology
- Social Sciences

== Membership ==
The National University of Lesotho is affiliated with the following organizations:

- Association of Commonwealth Universities
- Association of African Universities
- International Association of Universities
- Southern African Regional Universities Association
- Association of Eastern and Southern African Universities

== History ==
=== Pius XII Catholic University College ===
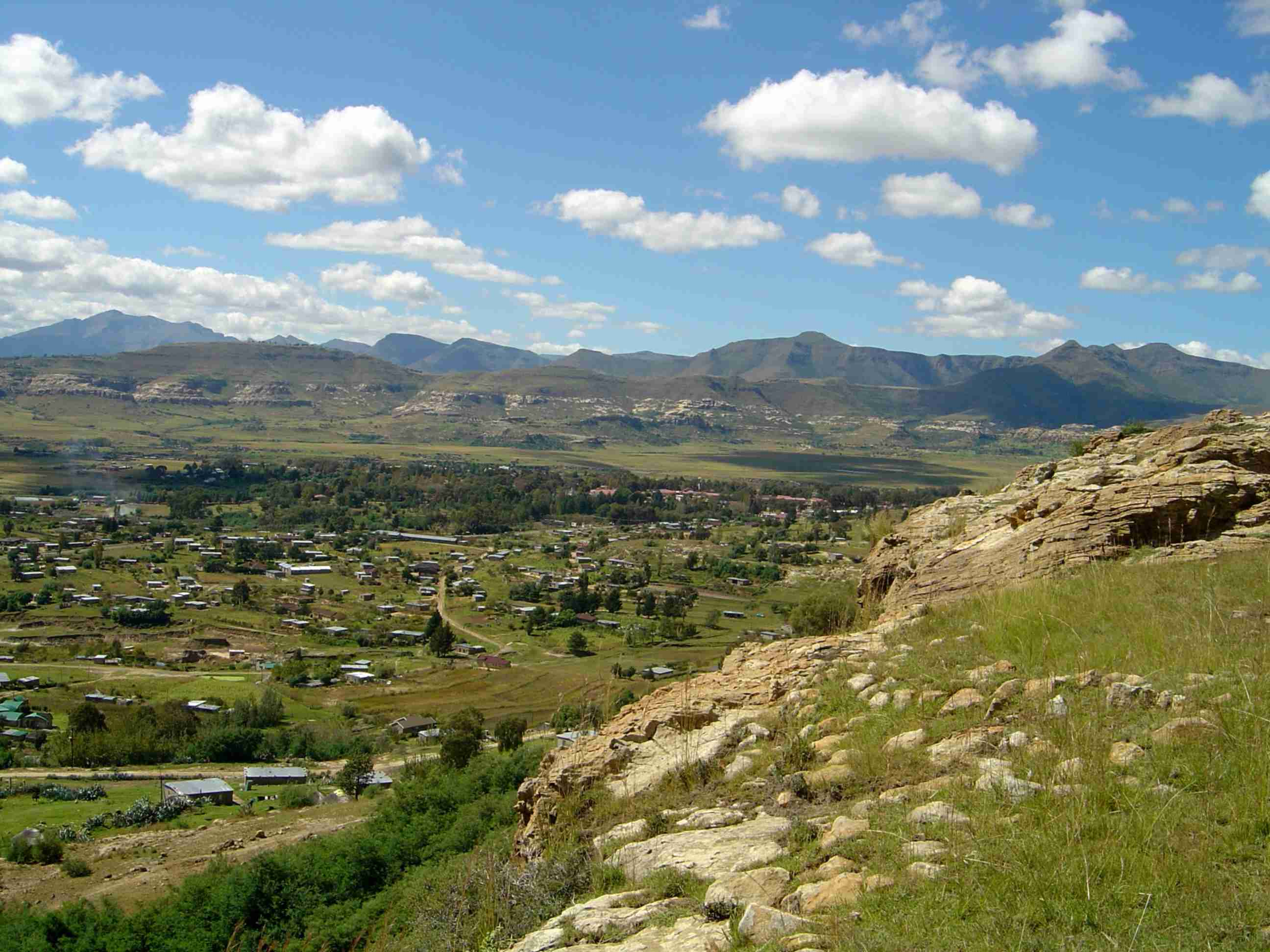
View to the National University of Lesotho (center)

The origins of the National University of Lesotho (NUL) date to April 8, 1945, when a Catholic University College was founded at Roma by the Roman Catholic Hierarchy of Southern Africa. The establishment of this college was a realisation of a decision taken in 1938 by the Synod of Catholic Bishops in South Africa to provide African Catholic students with post-matriculation and religious guidance. The Catholic University College was founded in an isolated valley 34 km (21 mi) from Maseru in a temporary primary school building at Roma Mission.

=== University of Basutoland, Bechuanaland Protectorate and Swaziland ===
On January 1, 1964, Pius XII University College was replaced by the independent, non-denominational University of Basutoland, Bechuanaland Protectorate, and Swaziland with its own charter granted by Queen Elizabeth II. By virtue of the same charter, the Oblate Fathers kept a close relationship with the U.B.B.S. through serving on the Council and teaching, as well as in the physical presence of Pius XII College House, a residence for the Oblate community.

=== University of Botswana, Lesotho and Swaziland ===
To be in line with the names chosen after independence in 1966, U.B.B.S. became the University of Botswana, Lesotho and Swaziland.

=== National University of Lesotho ===
The decision to establish the National University of Lesotho on the Lesotho (Roma) campus site of the former U.B.L.S. was taken on October 20, 1975, by the National Assembly through Act No. 13 of 1975. NUL is the proud heir of Pius XII University College and U.B.L.S. It occupies the same site, grounds, and buildings as its predecessors, as well as additional ones.

== Academic performance ==
The university in ranked 121st in Africa and 6,045th in the world.

There were 9,263 students at the university in 2018; 9,460 in 2017; 9,560 in 2016 and 9,239 in 2015.

There were 2,017 graduates at the university in 2020; 2,120 graduates in 2019 and 2,266 graduates in 2018.

There were 1,387 new enrolled students at the university in 2019 and 2,700 enrolled students in 2018.

The university offers 70 accredited study programmes.

In June 2011, the Lesotho Times reported that half of the students in three of the seven faculties at the university failed their examinations. This "unprecedented failure rate" was in the law, health sciences and science and technology faculties.

== Library ==
The National University of Lesotho supports open access in Lesotho and has signed the Budapest Open Access Initiative. In 2011, the National University of Lesotho has established the first institutional repository in the country. The National University of Lesotho Institutional Repository (NULIR) is the institutional repository and provides access to the research output of staff and students.

== Notable faculty ==
- Nthabiseng Mokoena (archaeologist)

== Notable alumni ==
See also Category:National University of Lesotho alumni

- King Letsie III of Lesotho
- Queen 'Masenate Mohato Seeiso, Queen Consort of Lesotho
- Tito Mboweni, Former Governor of the South African Reserve Bank and former Minister of Finance of South Africa
- Phumzile Mlambo-Ngcuka, ex Deputy President of South Africa
- Sheila Khala, Lesotho poet and author
- John Tembo, Malawian politician

== Honorary Doctoral recipients ==
- 1967 Mr. S. T. Sukati, Former Chairman and Member of the University Council and Speaker of the National Assembly of Swaziland, Doctor of Laws
- 1968 H. E. Sir Seretse Khama, Former Chancellor of UBLS 1967–1970, President of the Republic of Botswana, Doctor of Philosophy
- 1971 Professor J. W. Blake, Former Vice-Chancellor, UBLS, 1964–1971, Doctor of letters
- 1973 Dr. C. W. de IGewict, President Emeritus, University of Rochester, New York, Member of the University Council. Doctor of Literature
- 1973 Dr. H. F. Oppenheimer, Chancellor, University of Cape-Town, Chairman, Anglo American Corporation, Doctor of Literature
- 1978 Rev. Dr. Romeo Guilbeault, OMI Former Rector of Pius XII College, 1954–1959, Doctor of Literature
- 1978 Dr. Joshua Pulumo Mohapeloa, OBE, Composer, Doctor of Literature
- 1978 Dr. Nelson Mandela, First President of South Africa, former Political Leader and Robben Island Detainee in South Africa, Doctor of Laws
- 1980 Morena ‘Mako Moliboea, Chief of Khanyane, Doctor of Philosophy
- 1981 Dr. Amadou-Mahtar M’bow, Director General of UNESCO, Doctor of Philosophy
- 1993 Dr. Leabua Jonathan, Prime Minister of Lesotho, Doctor of Education
- 1983 Dr. Colin B. Mackay, Former President of the University of New Brunswick, Doctor of Education
- 1983 Dr. ’Masechele Khaketla, Author and High School Teacher, Doctor of Literature
- 1985 Dr. J. T. Kolane, Former Speaker of the National Assembly 1973–1985 in Lesotho, Doctor of Laws
- 1985 Dr. M. Damane, Historian, Doctor of Literature
- 1985 Dr. I. Mohamed, Professor of Mathematics, Doctor of Science and Mathematics
- 1987 Professor Josias Makibinyane Mohapeloa, Professor and Former Dean of Education, National University of Lesotho, Doctor of Philosophy in Education
- 1987 Dr. Julius Nyerere, Former President of the United Republic of Tanzania, Doctor of Laws
- 1987 Professor David Blackwell, Professor of Statistics, University of California, Berkeley, Doctor of Science
- 1990 Dr. J.J.N. Machobane, Agriculturalist & Writer, Doctor of Philosophy
- 1990 Dr. Ntsu Clement Mokhehle, Former Leader of the Basutoland Congress Party, Doctor of Laws
- 1990 Dr. Sam Nujoma, President of the Republic of Namibia, Doctor of Laws
- 1991 Dr. B.T. Mohapeloa, Teacher & Pioneer of Self-help Organisation, Doctor of Letters
- 1992 Dr. Oliver Tambo, Former Leader of the African National Congress, Doctor of Laws
- 1996 Dr. B.M. Khaketla, Writer, Doctor of Philosophy
- 1997 Dr. Paul Ellenberger, Palaeontologist, Doctor of Science
- 2001 Dr. Matamela Cyril Ramaphosa, Fifth President of South Africa, Lawyer, Businessman, Labour and Political Leader, Doctor of Laws.
- 2001 Dr. Thokoana James Motlatsi, Businessman and Labour Leader, Doctor of Philosophy in Social Sciences
- 2005 Dr. Karabo Eric Lekhanya, Renowned music composer, Doctor of Literature
- 2005 Dr. Nkau J. Lepheana, Renowned music composer, Doctor of Literature
- 2005 Dr. Benjamin William Mkapa, Former President of the United Republic of Tanzania, Doctor of Law
- 2006 Dr. Anthony Malefetsane Setšabi, Former Vice Chancellor of the National University of Lesotho, Doctor of Education
- 2006 Dr. Robert Dunbar Leslie, Founder of the Department of Law at the University of Basutoland, Bechuanaland and Swaziland, Doctor of Law
- 2010 Professor Adamu David Baikie, Former Vice Chancellor of the National University of Lesotho, Doctor of Philosophy
- 2010 Mr. Mothusi Mashologu, Former Vice Chancellor of the National University of Lesotho, Doctor of Literature
