= Education in Eswatini =

Education in Eswatini includes pre-school, primary, secondary and high schools, for general education and training (GET), and universities and colleges at tertiary level.

Pre-school education is usually for children five years or younger. Primary school education begins for children at age seven, at the end of which students take the external primary school certificate exam. Primary school is followed by junior secondary school which is three years. The final two years of secondary school lead to pre-university training. The final school exam is the Swaziland General Certificate of Education (SGCSE) or the International General Certificate of Education (IGCSE). A few schools offer the AS and A-levels or the International Baccalaureate.

Tertiary education in Eswatini includes universities, technical and vocational colleges, teacher and nursing colleges and business colleges, located in various towns and cities around the country, with the biggest concentration being in the Manzini-Mbabane corridor. The University of Eswatini is the national university, and the only institution offering research level and post-graduate facilities in the country. Many students enroll in universities and colleges in neighboring countries such as South Africa.

The Human Rights Measurement Initiative (HRMI) finds that Eswatini is fulfilling only 55.7% of what it should be fulfilling for the right to education based on the country's level of income. HRMI breaks down the right to education by looking at the rights to both primary education and secondary education. While taking into consideration Eswatini's income level, the nation is achieving 67.4% of what should be possible based on its resources (income) for primary education but only 44.1% for secondary education.

== Early childhood to high school ==
In Eswatini, early childhood care and education (ECCE) centers are in the form of preschools or neighborhood care points (NCPs). 21.6% of preschool-age children had access to early childhood education in 2015. Primary education in Eswatini begins at the age of six, and is a seven-year program that culminates with an end of primary school examination [SPC], in grade 7, which is a locally based assessment administered by the Examinations Council through schools. Primary education is from grade 1 to grade 7.

The secondary and high school education system in Eswatini is a five-year program divided into three years of junior secondary and two years of senior secondary. There is an external public examination (Junior Certificate) at the end of the junior secondary years which students must pass in order to progress to the senior secondary level. The Examination Council of Swaziland (ECOS) administers this examinations.

At the end of the senior secondary level, students take a public examination, the Swaziland General Certificate of Secondary Education (SGCSE) and International General Certificate of Secondary Education (IGCSE), which is accredited by the Cambridge International Examination (CIE). A few schools offer the Advanced Studies (AS) programme in their curriculum.

There are 830 public schools in Eswatini, including primary, secondary, and high schools. There also 34 recognised private schools, with an additional 14 unrecognised. The biggest number of schools is in the Hhohho region. Education in Eswatini, as of 2009, is free at the primary level, mainly grades 1 through 4, and is also free for orphaned and vulnerable children, though not compulsory.

In 1996, the net primary school enrollment rate was 90.8%, with gender parity at the primary level. In 1998, 80.5% of children reached grade five.

Swaziland is home to a United World College. In 1963, Waterford school, later named Waterford Kamhlaba United World College of Southern Africa, was founded as southern Africa's first multiracial school. In 1981, Waterford Kamhlaba joined the United World Colleges movement as the first and only United World College on the African continent.

Adult and non-formal education centres include Sebenta National Institute for adult basic literacy and Emlalatini Development Centre, which provides alternative educational opportunities for school children and young adults who have not been able to complete their schooling.

St Joseph's School is known for providing services for disabled students as well as vocational training for adults.

In 2019, the Kirsh Foundation began installing "free fast Internet" to Emaswati primary schools, promoting parity in education with developed nations, with the target goal of 100 schools online that are already furnished with computer equipment by the foundation's computer education trust, with Philip Kirsh overseeing the installations.

== Higher education ==
The University of Eswatini, Southern African Nazarene University, Swaziland Christian University are the institutions that offer university education in the country. A campus of Limkokwing University of Creative Technology can be found at Sidvwashini, a suburb of the capital Mbabane. There are some teaching and nursing assistant colleges around the country. Ngwane Teacher's College and William Pitcher College are the country's teaching colleges. The Good Shepherd Hospital in Siteki is home to the College for Nursing Assistants.

The University of Swaziland is the national university which was established in 1982 by act of parliament and is headquartered at Kwaluseni with two more campuses in Mbabane and Luyengo. The Southern African Nazarene University (SANU) was established in 2010 as a merger of the Nazarene College of Nursing, College of Theology and the Nazarene Teachers College. It is located in Manzini next to the Raleigh Fitkin Memorial Hospital. The Swaziland Christian University is Swaziland's newest university having been established in 2012 with focus on medical education. The university is located in Mbabane. The campus of Limkokwing University was opened in Eswatini in 2012 and is located at Sidvwashini in Mbabane.

The main centre for technical training in Eswatini is the Swaziland College of Technology which is slated to become a full university. It aim to provide and facilitating high quality training and learning in technology and business studies in collaboration with the Commercial, Industrial and Public Sectors. Other technical and vocational institutions are the Gwamile Vocational and Commercial Training Institute located in Matsapha and the Manzini Industrial and Training Centre (MITC) in Manzini. Other vocational institutions include Nhlangano Agricultural Skills Training Center and Siteki Industrial Training Centre.

In addition to these institutions, Eswatini also has the Swaziland Institute of Management and Public Administration (SIMPA) and Institute of Development Management (IDM). SIMPA is a government owned management and development institute and IDM is a regional organisation in Botswana, Lesotho and Eswatini that provides training, consultancy, and research in management. The Mananga management centre was established as Mananga Agricultural Management Centre in 1972 as an International Management Development Centre catering for middle and senior managers, it is located at Ezulwini.

== Libraries ==
The Swaziland National Library Service is the national library department under the Ministry of Information, Communications and Technology. It is headquartered at the public library in Mbabane. Branches of the national library are located in the main cities and towns around the country. The Swaziland National Library Service operates public community libraries throughout Eswatini and establishes school libraries in partnership with Fundza, a non-governmental organization and the African Library Project.

The library of the University of Swaziland also provides library services in Eswatini to the university community and to external members. The Swaziland library association (SWALA) an organisation formed in 1984 promotes the establishment of libraries in the country.

== See also ==
- List of schools in Eswatini
