= List of schools in Eswatini =

This is a list of notable schools located in the African country of Eswatini.

== Mbabane ==
- St Mark's School
- Waterford Kamhlaba
- Sifundzani High School

== See also ==
- Education in Eswatini
- Lists of schools
