= Inclusive education in Eswatini =

According to the 2017 census of Eswatini, people with disabilities account for 176.184, representing 16,1% of the country’s population. The prevalence is much higher in rural areas given that 82% of people with disabilities live in rural areas whilst the remaining 18% belong to urban areas. The 2017 Population and Housing Census on the other hand, posits that about 52% of people with disabilities in Eswatini have no education. Of those that attend school, 22,3% attain primary school certificates, while 9,6% hold junior certificates. Moreover, the 2019 Annual Education Census indicates that there are 41.565 learners with special needs and disabilities in primary (special and regular) schools in the country, of whom 54% are males and 45% are females. Notably, is that a number of the learners are over-aged for primary, (15 to 21+) and this is attributed to their late entry into school or repetition which is prevalent amongst children with special needs and disabilities.

Special needs education (also known as special education, aided education, exceptional education), is the practice of educating students in a way that addresses their individual differences and needs. These differences include physical, mental, sensory, neurological and developmental impairments, psychosocial issues, and differences in their intellectual ability, life experiences or socio-economic deprivation. Special needs education is a modified programme which involves some unique tools, techniques, and research efforts in improving instructional arrangements to meet the needs of exceptional children.

== Special schools in Eswatini ==
The Ministry of Education and Training's Special Education Policy Statement, stipulates that Eswatini has several schools accommodating Persons with Special Needs (PSN) across the four regions. These include:

- Manzini region, St Joseph's primary and secondary school for the blind or visually impaired
- Lubombo region is the School for the deaf
- Ekwetsembeni primary school in the Hhohho region.(mainly autistic children) and Mbasheni primary school
- Qinisweni Primary school in the Shiselweni region

However, centres for special programmes such as vocational training for the disabled persons have since been established. The Ekululameni (Mzimpofu) vocational centre at Ngculwini (Manzini region) and the Vocational and Training institution in Nhlangano (Shiselweni region) are the best-known ones in the country.

== Achievements in inclusive education ==
In accordance with the country's Constitution under Section 30, along with United Nation Convention on the Rights of Persons with Disabilities particularly Article 8, there have been efforts to bridge the gap for persons with special needs. For example, all tertiary institutions in Eswatini are inclusive of Special Need Education and welcome all high school students graduates. This also includes and all young and old persons for mature age entry levels without necessarily segregating them because of their SNE requirements. This aligns with the 1999 National Education Policy Statement issued by the Ministry of Education and Training

Article 24 of the CRPD (2006) also stipulates that State Parties shall ensure access to inclusive, quality and free primary and secondary education on an equal basis with others. To safeguard this right, the Ministry of Education in Eswatini has rolled out free primary education as per the “Free Basic Education Act’ which was enacted in 2010 and introduced Special Need and Inclusive Education in three teacher training colleges in the country namely:

- William Pitcher College
- Ngwane Teachers College
- Nazarene Teachers College
- Moreover, Eswatini Communications Commission (ESSCOM) has donated specialized equipment for visually impaired students at the University of Eswatini (UNESWA) which displays the commitment to recognise persons with special needs. Furthermore, Qinisweni Secondary high school and Mbasheni High have employed sign language interpreters

Institutions of learning have also created an accessible environment for persons living with disabilities like wheelchair ramps instead of staircases and blending them with normal children as of the case at Mzimpofu School depending on the severity of the disability.

== Challenges ==
Despite the efforts in place for an inclusive education system there lies several challenges. Firstly, the systematized early identification of children with special education needs does not exist in Eswatini, class teachers, especially at primary school level, are normally tasked with the complex task of identifying the students who may need Special Education, and in extension SNE. Secondly there is minimal teacher development as parents fail to detect the early signs teachers need continuous capacity building for before and on the job. At times when the Government of Eswatini sends schools’ materials to be used for educational purposes for disabled children and persons, it is normally materials in line with mainstream education. Teachers and administrators in these schools work hard to adapt the materials to the specific requirements, thus at times they have to rely on donors, who might not always come through with help.
