= Sifundzani School =

International school in Eswatini

- Mbabane; Eswatini

Information
- School type: International school
- Established: 1981; 45 years ago
- Founder: Mary CL Fraser
- Grades: 1-12
- Enrollment: 631 (2004-2005)
- Language: English
- Website: www.sifundzani.ac.sz

Sifundzani School is an international school in Mbabane, Eswatini. It is a coeducational day school that offers an educational program from grades 1 through 12 for students of all nationalities. It was founded in 1981 by Scottish-born Mary CL Fraser (MBE).

== Curriculum ==
The curriculum is geared to the Swazi syllabus which is based on the British system, but is expanded to enable children from the United States and other countries to fit into the educational system in their home countries when they leave Eswatini. Instruction is in English with French and Siswati being taught as second languages. English-as-a-Second-Language is also included in the curriculum. Art, music, music appreciation, dance, piano, and recorder lessons are offered by visiting specialists.

Physical education, offered at all grade levels, includes swimming, soccer, cricket, hockey, tennis, squash, and netball. The school offers computer instruction to all grades. The Iowa Test of Basic Skills is administered to determine students' progress and to diagnose any problem areas. Extracurricular activities include drama, chess, cross country, choir, art, and needlework.

== Enrollment ==
At the beginning of the 2004-2005 school year, enrollment was 631 (grades 1-7: 403; and grades 8-12: 228). Of the total, 9 were U.S. citizens, 441 were host-country nationals, and 181 were dependents of other nationalities.

== Faculty ==
In the 2004-2005 school year, there were 35 full-time and 13 part-time teachers. The staff includes three U.S. citizens, 15 host-country nationals and 30 third-country nationals. The primary school Principal is Ella Magongo and high school Principal is Phindile Magongo.

== Facilities ==
The primary school, on four levels, is housed in four blocks which contain 15 classrooms, a multi-purpose hall, a media centre, a multi-purpose room, an administrative office, and a staff room. The sports facilities include a 25-meter x 15-meter swimming pool with changing rooms, a small and a large full-sized playing field, and two tennis courts.

The high school is situated at a separate location about 2.5 kilometres from the primary school and includes seven double classroom blocks, a multi-purpose room, an administrative office, a computer laboratory, an art room, a tuck shop, a multi-purpose hall, a science laboratory, and sports field. Some sports facilities are shared with the primary school. High school students study for the IGCSE and HIGCSE examinations.

== Finances ==
In the 2004-2005 school year, 100% of the school income was derived from tuition and fees. The annual tuition rates are: grades 1-8: $1,180; and grades 9-11: $2,600 US dollars. Uniform cost is around $200.

== Sources ==
This article was adapted from a US State Department report released on November 30, 2004, which is in the public domain:

- United States Department of State
