= Nkulunkulu Mnikati wetibusiso temaSwati =

National anthem of Eswatini

English: God, the Giver of blessings to the Swati people
- National anthem of Eswatini
- Lyrics: Andrease Enoke Fanyana Simelane
- Music: David Kenneth Rycroft
- Adopted: 1968

Audio sample
- U.S. Navy Band instrumental version: file; help

"Nkulunkulu Mnikati wetibusiso temaSwati" (Note: Swazi pronunciation: [ᵑkuluᵑkulu m͡nikatʼi wɛtʼiɓusisɔ tʼɛmasʷatʼi]) is the national anthem of Eswatini. It is a compromise between Swazi and Western styles of music and was adopted after independence in 1968. The lyrics were authored by Andrease Enoke Fanyana Kukies Simelane, and the composer of the tune was David Kenneth Rycroft.

== History ==
At the time of Eswatini's (then known as Swaziland) upcoming independence from the United Kingdom on 6 September 1968, a new flag was adopted, and it was decided to set up an Anthem Committee and hold a 'National Anthem Competition'. Firstly, a local competition for suitable lyrics in siSwati was held, then a competition for the best musical settings was advertised in The Musical Times in London in early 1967, offering a prize for the winner, with composers being invited to apply to Swaziland's Ministry of Local Administration.

Applicants received the lyrics 10 months later around October 1967, which were in two forms, as the judges had not been able to agree on a single text. With the competition's closing date by 1968, on 1 November 1967 the Ministry issued a circular updating on their progress in the search for lyrics, now narrowed down to the two proposals, and music, still open to submissions. The Ministry stated that the lyrics were to be decided after the musical settings had been judged. Composers could submit music for one or both verses.

The judges eventually narrowed down to four settings of the lyrics to music, which were then each recorded and performed by the choir of the Ionian Music Society of Johannesburg. The Cabinet was then to decide on which to adopt as the national anthem, but members of the Cabinet wished to hear live performances by a local choir. They requested the choir of Waterford School in Mbabane to sing the four settings for them on 9 July 1968. Ultimately, David K. Rycroft's setting of verse A was chosen as the winner.

On 16 August 1968, it was reported in The Times of Swaziland that Deputy Prime Minister Mfundza Sukati had announced that a choral version of the new anthem would be played on Radio Swaziland every day until Independence Day to give people a chance to learn the anthem. Sukati stated that the words were written by Andrease Fanyana Kukies Simelane of Jerusalem School, near Hlatikulu. He also stated that a member of the British Royal Military School of Music had arranged a musical score based on David Rycroft's setting, which was recorded by the Band of the Irish Guards.

== Lyrics ==
The anthem includes several typically Swazi features, such as intricate polyphony, the principle of 'non-simultaneous entry' of voice parts; certain melodic and harmonic allusions to traditional practice; and a relatively strict adherence to Swazi prosodic conventions, the rhythmic setting of words to music.

siSwati lyrics

A
Nkulunkulu Mnikati wetibusiso temaSwati;
Siyatibonga tonkhe tinhlanhla;
Sibonga iNgwenyama yetfu.
Live netintsaba nemifula.

B
Busisa tiphatsimandla takaNgwane;
Nguwe wedvwa Somandla wetfu;
Sinike kuhlakanipha lokungenabucili
Simise usicinise, Simakadze.

IPA transcription (Note: See Help:IPA and Swazi language § Phonology.)

1
[ᵑku.lu.ᵑku.lu m͡ni.ka.tʼi wɛ.tʼi.ɓu.si.sɔ tʼɛ.ma.sʷa.tʼi]
[si.ja.tʼi.ɓɔ.ŋa tʼɔ.ᵑkʰɛ tʼi.ⁿɫa.ⁿɫa]
[si.ɓɔ.ŋa i.ᵑ(g)ʷɛ.ɲa.ma jɛ.t͡fu]
[li.vɛ nɛ.tʼi.ⁿt͡s(ʼ)a.ɓa nɛ.mi.fu.la]

2
[ɓu.si.sa tʼi.pʰa.t͡s(ʼ)i.ma.ⁿɮa tʼa.ka.ᵑ(g)ʷa.nɛ]
[ŋu.wɛ wɛ.d͡vʷa sɔ.ma.ⁿɮa wɛ.t͡fu]
[si.ni.kɛ ku.ɬa.ka.ni.pʰa lɔ.ku.ŋɛ.na.ɓu.ᵏǀi.li]
[si.mi.sɛ u.si.ᵏǀi.ni.sɛ si.ma.ka.d͡zɛ]

English translation

A
O Lord our God, bestower of the blessings of the Swazi;
We give Thee thanks for all our good fortune;
We offer thanks and praise for our King
And for our fair land, its hills and rivers.

B
Thy blessings be on all rulers of our Country;
Thine alone is our Lord;
We pray Thee to grant us wisdom without deceit or malice.
Establish and fortify us, Lord Eternal.
