= Demographics of Eswatini =

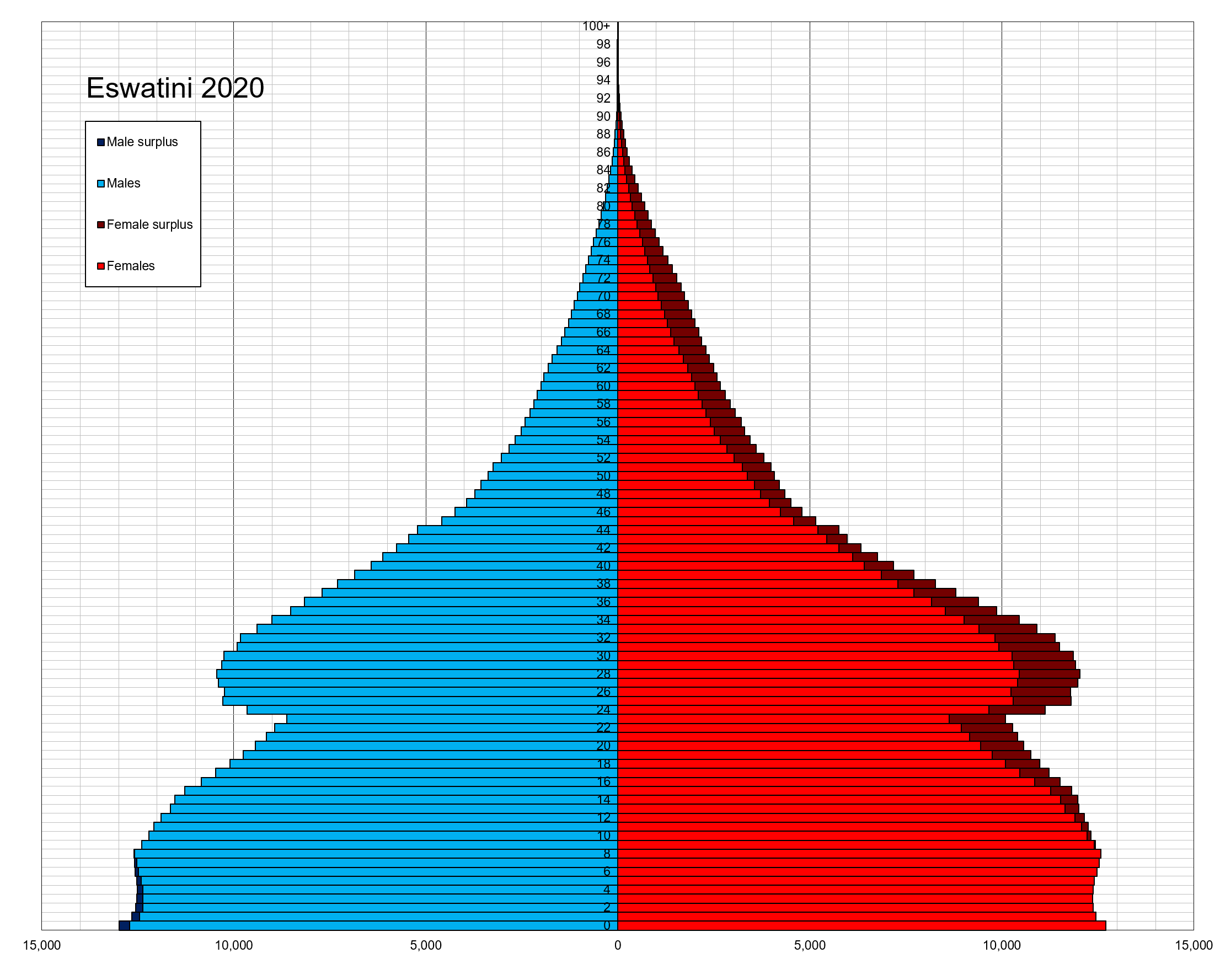
- Population pyramid of Eswatini in 2020
- Population: 1,121,761 (2022 est.)
- Growth rate: 0.75% (2022 est.)
- Birth rate: 23.35 births/1,000 population (2022 est.)
- Death rate: 9.71 deaths/1,000 population (2022 est.)
- Life expectancy: 59.69 years
  - male: 57.62 years
  - female: 61.81 years
- Fertility rate: 2.44 children born/woman (2022 est.)
- Infant mortality rate: 39.63 deaths/1,000 live births
- Net migration rate: -6.16 migrant(s)/1,000 population (2022 est.)

Age structure
- 0–14 years: 33.63%
- 65 and over: 3.83%

Sex ratio
- Total: 0.9 male(s)/female (2022 est.)
- At birth: 1.03 male(s)/female
- Under 15: 1 male(s)/female
- 65 and over: 0.48 male(s)/female

Nationality
- Nationality: Swati

Language
- Official: English, siSwati

Demographic features of the population of Eswatini include population density, ethnicity, education level, health of the populace, economic status, religious affiliations and other aspects of the population.

The majority of Eswatini's population is ethnic Swazi, mixed with a small number of Zulus and white Africans, predominantly of British and Afrikaner origin. This population also includes a small segment within it that is mixed with any number of these ancestries.

Traditionally Swazis have been subsistence farmers and herders, but most now work in the growing urban formal economy and in government. Some Swazis work in the mines in South Africa. Eswatini also received Portuguese settlers and black refugees from Mozambique. Christianity in Eswatini is sometimes mixed with traditional beliefs and practices. Most Swazis ascribe a special spiritual role to the Swazi Royal Family.

The country's official languages are Siswati (a language related to Zulu) and English. Government and commercial business is conducted mainly in English. Asians, Afrikaners, Portuguese, and black Mozambicans speak their own languages.

== Population ==
Demographics of Eswatini, Data of UNDESA (Population Division), year 2019; Number of inhabitants in thousands.

Eswatini's population is 1,113,276 according to the July 2021 estimate from the CIA World Factbook. The 2007 Census put the nation's population at 912,229. This number is lower than the 1997 Census, which gave 929,718 residents. The small difference is believed to be the result of massive emigration of Swazis to South Africa in search of work.

According to the 2010 revision of the World Population Prospects the total population was 1,186,000 in 2010, compared to only 273,000 in 1950. The proportion of children below the age of 15 in 2010 was 38.4%, 58.2% was between 15 and 65 years of age, while 3.4% was 65 years or older.

Year	Total population	Population percentage		
Year	Total population	aged 0–14	aged 15–64	aged 65+
1950	273 000	43.0%	54.3%	2.7%
1955	307 000	44.2%	53%	2.8%
1960	349 000	45.2%	52%	2.8%
1965	392 000	46.3%	51.0%	2.7%
1970	446 000	47.2%	50.1%	2.7%
1975	517 000	48.0%	49.3%	2.7%
1980	603 000	48.8%	48.5%	2.7%
1985	706 000	48.9%	48.3%	2.8%
1990	863 000	48.1%	49.2%	2.7%
1995	964 000	47.6%	49.6%	2.8%
2000	1 064 000	44.6%	52.4%	3.0%
2005	1 105 000	41.8%	55%	3.2%
2010	1 186 000	38.4%	58.2%	3.4%

Population by Sex and Age Group (Census 29.IV.2017):

Age group	Male	Female	Total	%
Total	531 111	562 127	1 093 238	100
0–4	65 218	64 990	130 208	11.91
5–9	65 109	64 719	129 828	11.88
10–14	63 783	63 654	127 437	11.66
15–19	60 955	59 213	120 168	10.99
20–24	52 280	54 236	106 516	9.74
25–29	46 551	50 188	96 739	8.85
30–34	42 148	44 222	86 370	7.90
35–39	33 443	33 538	66 981	6.13
40–44	24 428	25 268	49 696	4.55
45–49	19 194	22 084	41 278	3.78
50–54	14 094	18 724	32 818	3.00
55–59	12 062	15 754	27 816	2.54
60–64	10 059	12 810	22 869	2.09
65–69	7 322	10 037	17 359	1.59
70–74	4 998	8 256	13 254	1.21
75–79	3 484	5 664	9 148	0.84
80+	2 846	6 193	9 039	0.83
Age group	Male	Female	Total	Percent
0–14	194 110	193 363	387 473	35.44
15–64	315 214	336 037	651 251	59.57
65+	18 650	30 150	48 800	4.46
Unknown	3 137	2 577	5 714	0.52

== Vital statistics ==
Registration of vital events in Eswatini is not complete. The Population Department of the United Nations prepared the following estimates.

Period	Live births per year	Deaths per year	Natural change per year	CBR*	CDR*	NC*	TFR*	IMR*
1950–1955	14 000	7 000	7 000	48.1	22.6	25.5	6.70	174
1955–1960	16 000	7 000	9 000	47.6	20.8	26.8	6.70	160
1960–1965	18 000	7 000	10 000	47.9	19.6	28.2	6.75	150
1965–1970	20 000	8 000	13 000	49.0	18.5	30.4	6.85	141
1970–1975	24 000	8 000	16 000	49.3	16.4	32.9	6.87	124
1975–1980	27 000	8 000	19 000	48.5	14.2	34.2	6.73	108
1980–1985	31 000	8 000	23 000	47.7	12.0	35.7	6.54	90
1985–1990	36 000	8 000	28 000	46.1	10.3	35.8	6.13	77
1990–1995	36 000	9 000	28 000	39.9	9.4	30.4	5.30	69
1995–2000	35 000	12 000	22 000	34.1	11.9	22.1	4.49	80
2000–2005	34 000	17 000	17 000	31.8	15.7	16.1	4.01	87
2005–2010	34 000	17 000	17 000	30.1	14.9	15.2	3.57	76
* CBR = crude birth rate (per 1000); CDR = crude death rate (per 1000); NC = natural change (per 1000); IMR = infant mortality rate per 1000 births; TFR = total fertility rate (number of children per woman)

=== Demographic and Health Surveys ===
Total Fertility Rate (TFR) (Wanted Fertility Rate) and Crude Birth Rate (CBR):

Year	Total		Urban		Rural	
Year	CBR	TFR	CBR	TFR	CBR	TFR
1986		6,4				
1991		5,6				
1997		4,5				
1999–2002		4,2				
2006–2007	31,1	3,8 (2,1)	31,9	3,0 (1,8)	31,0	4,2 (2,2)

=== Life expectancy at birth ===
Life expectancy from 1950 to 2015 (UN World Population Prospects):

Period	Life expectancy in Years
1950–1955	41.44
1955–1960	▲43.47
1960–1965	▲45.05
1965–1970	▲46.69
1970–1975	▲49.61
1975–1980	▲52.61
1980–1985	▲56.15
1985–1990	▲59.66
1990–1995	▼59.44
1995–2000	▼52.50
2000–2005	▼45.93
2005–2010	▲48.41
2010–2015	▲54.99

== Ethnic groups ==
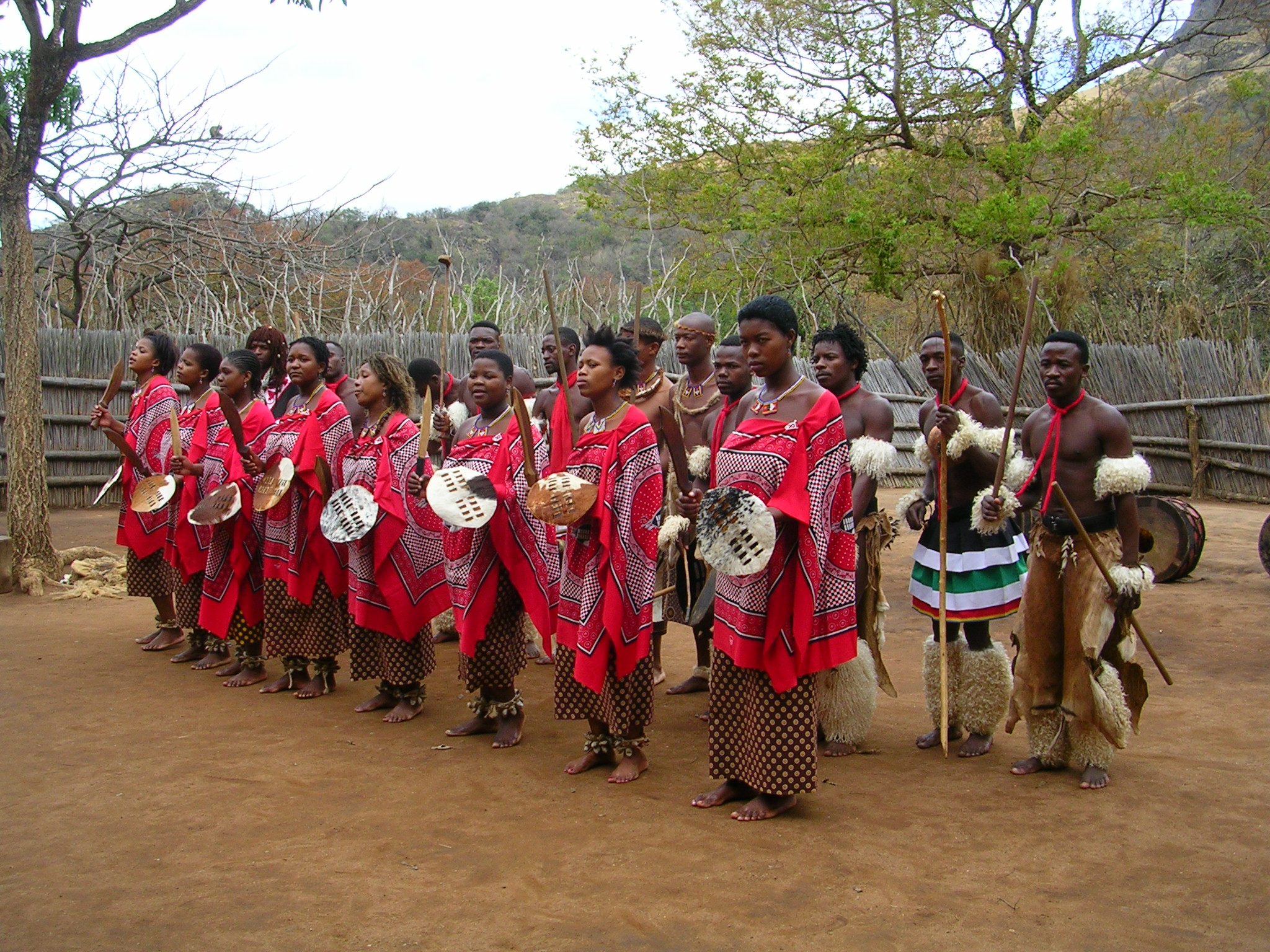
Swazi people dancing in a cultural village show.

- Swazi 84.3%
- Zulu 9.9%
- Tsonga 2.5%
- Indian 0.8%
- Pakistani 0.8%
- Portuguese 0.5%

== Languages ==
- English (official, used for government business)
- siSwati (official)

== Religion ==
Christian 90% (Zionist – a blend of Christianity and indigenous ancestral worship – 40%, Roman Catholic 20%, other 30% – includes Anglican, Methodist, Church of Jesus Christ, Jehovah's Witness), Muslim 2%, other 8% (includes Baha'i, Buddhist, Hindu, indigenous, Jewish) (2015 est.)

== See also ==
- HIV/AIDS in Swaziland
