= Royal Jozini =

Private game reserve in Eswatini

Royal Jozini Big 6
- Location within Eswatini
- Location: Shiselweni, Eswatini
- Nearest town: Lavumisa, Eswatini
- Coordinates: 27°16′50.60″S 31°57′18.39″E
- Area: 160 km^{2} (62 sq mi)
- Established: 2008

The Royal Jozini is a private game reserve located in the foothills of the Lubombo Mountains and includes the northern part of Lake Jozini in Eswatini. It is part of the Nsubane-Pongola Transfrontier Conservation and Resource Area established by a Swaziland/South Africa Protocol covering some 14,000 hectares. The estate includes private lodges, a waterfront area including a boating marina, as well as a jetty and slipway.
