= Eswatini Environment Authority =

Government agency of Eswatini

The Eswatini Environment Authority, (EEA) is mandated to provide for and promote the protection, conservation and enhancement of the environment and the sustainable management of natural resources of Eswatini. It was created by the Swaziland Environment Act, 1992, and was transformed into a corporate body by The Environment Management Act, 2002. This latter act gives the SEA the power to halt developments that have not been adequately scrutinised for their environmental impact. It is a department of the Ministry of Tourism and Environmental Affairs.
