= International rankings of Eswatini =

Formerly called Swaziland, Eswatini is a small, impoverished country, with high unemployment and the world's highest prevalence of HIV/AIDS.

The following are international rankings of Eswatini.

== Geography ==
Measure	Rank	Source	Value
Land area, sq km	158	World Bank	17,200
Population density, Persons per sq km	145	Countries of the World	65.68

== Population ==
Measure	Rank	Source	Value
Midyear Population	161	United States Census Bureau International Database	1,145,871
Birth rate	49	Countries of the World	22.80 births/1,000 population
Life expectancy at birth	140	CIA World Factbook	60 years

== Economy ==
Measure	Rank	Source	Value
Human Development Index	126	United Nations Development Programme	0.695
Real GDP (purchasing power parity)	161	CIA World Factbook	$12.885 billion (2024 est.)
Current account balance	Countries of the World	$124.463 million	
