= Lyric setting =

Process of aligning text to a musical rhythm

Lyric setting is the process in songwriting of placing textual content (lyrics) in the context of musical rhythm, in which the lyrical meter and musical rhythm are in proper alignment as to preserve the natural shape of the language and promote prosody.

Prosody is defined as "an appropriate relationship between elements." According to Pat Pattison, author of Writing Better Lyrics, prosody is created when all musical and lyrical elements work together to support the central message of a song. To achieve prosody, the rhythmic placement of a lyric in music must support its natural rhythm, meaning, and emotion.

Proper lyric setting involves the identification of stressed and unstressed syllables. These syllables are distinguished by their suprasegmentals, or their qualities of intonation, duration, and dynamics. The numerous parts of speech hold different levels of meaning and are assigned different levels of importance. Stress is not only determined by natural rhythmic meter, but also by a word's level of meaning.

Stressed and unstressed syllables form into rhythmic patterns, similar to musical beats. All musical time signatures are made up of strong and weak beats. The stressed and unstressed syllabic patterns of lyrical content are aligned with strong and weak beats of music in order to ensure lyrics are easily recognized, correctly understood, and fulfill their ultimate meaning and emotion. The purpose of proper lyric setting in a song is to establish lyrical content in its most authentic form to promote relatability.

== Suprasegmentals ==
All languages are made up of segments called vowels and consonants. Vowels may stand on their own or join with consonants to create syllables. Words are made up of one or more syllables. Superimposed on syllables are other speech features such as stress or tone called suprasegmentals, also known as prosodic features. These sounds are present over syllables, words, and phrases. Suprasegmentals can be considered the "musical" aspects of speech. The common prosodic features are intonation, duration, and dynamics. It is of importance to identify these suprasegmentals in language, as it is the combination of these variables that defines the stressed and unstressed syllables of words. The factors of intonation, duration, and dynamics contribute greatly to the process of identifying and executing proper lyric setting.

=== Intonation ===
In the English language, intonation, or pitch, is a suprasegmental that incorporates three variables:

1. The division of speech into units
2. The highlighting of particular words and syllables
3. The choice of pitch movement

Intonation acoustically corresponds to fundamental frequency. It is one feature that defines the division of speech into units through the various pitches that syllables are naturally assigned. In this way, pitch plays an important role in differentiating stressed and unstressed syllables through lower and higher pitches, and in creating rhythm in language. Intonation is additionally used in speech for special effect, highlighting words to create emphasis or to support a specific emotion. However, this choice is made subconsciously. The application of pitch in the English language is not an artificial process, and native speakers utilize pitch fluctuations in words, sentences, and exclamations inherently. Recognizing lower and higher pitches in language during the process of lyric setting increases the probability of preserving the natural shape of the language.

=== Duration ===
In speech, duration, or length of sounds, is a suprasegmental measured in time units such as milliseconds or seconds. In music, however, duration is measured in note value regarding beats and their subdivisions. Syllables in the English language are naturally expressed with various durations. In partnership with pitch, the duration of a syllable can indicate the prominence of a syllable, or whether it is stressed or unstressed. The length of sounds contributes greatly to the rhythm of language, and the composition of poetry and lyrics. Recognition of the duration of syllables during lyric setting increases the probability of properly setting words, and, in addition, promoting prosody through length of musical time.

=== Dynamics ===
Dynamics in speech are distinctions between levels of volume, varying between soft and loud. Acoustically, dynamics correspond to intensity, also known as sound pressure level, which is measured in decibels. Syllables in the English language are expressed through different dynamics depending on their natural prominence, or stress. Dynamics are also used outside of normal speech patterns to emphasize certain words or to express particular emotions. Recognizing dynamics in speech during the process of lyric setting can increase the probability of preserving the natural emotion that is responsible for the dynamics and promote prosody in music.

== Stress ==
The English language consists of sentences, which are made up of phrases, which are made up of words, which are made up of syllables. There are two types of syllables: stressed and unstressed, also referred to as strong and weak. A stress is the accentuation or emphasis in a word.

Intonation, duration, and dynamics are all suprasegmentals that contribute to determining the prominence, or stress, of a syllable in relationship to other syllables. Pitch is considered the strongest variable that determines syllable prominence, with duration and dynamics following in that order.

Before defining a stressed syllable, it is important to define an unstressed syllable. Every human voice has its natural resting pitch, which varies from person to person. In musical terms, this pitch would be recognized as the voice’s tonic, tonal center, or resolution tone. This is the pitch that all unstressed syllables rest on.

A stressed syllable is one that is emphasized, or has prominence. In contrast to an unstressed syllable, a stressed syllable has a higher pitch. In musical terms, this pitch is commonly a perfect fourth, perfect fifth, or even minor third, above the voice’s tonic. A stressed syllable tends to have a longer duration and louder volume. This contrasts with unstressed syllables to indicate superior meaning.

Organized patterns of stressed and unstressed syllables create rhythms and meter in poetry and lyric writing. They are often marked with different symbols when being analyzed. Stressed syllables are indicated with a forward slash (/) and unstressed syllables are indicated with a lowercase "u."

=== Parts of speech ===
Stressed vs. unstressed syllables are not only identifiable in regards to the natural shape of the language, but also in regards to function. Different parts of speech carry different levels of meaning, and, therefore, are stressed differently.

Words that serve the meaning function, also called the semantic or cognitive function, are:

- nouns
- verbs
- adjectives
- adverbs

These words are always stressed, because they hold meaning. Words that serve the grammatical function, also called syntactic function, are:

- articles - the, a, an
- conjunctions - and, but, yet, if, or
- prepositions - in, on, at, to, into, before, after
- personal pronouns - I, you, she, it, they, us, them

Grammatical functions do not hold meaning. Therefore, these words are unstressed. The grammatical function’s purpose is to support words that serve the meaning function.

There are exceptions, however, to these guidelines. This is particularly true when dealing with a contrast. The following sentences give examples of these contrasts and when it is appropriate to stress grammatical functions:

1. I said I loved you, not him.
2. Run to him, not past him.
3. The pancakes were mine, not yours.

It is correct to stress these grammatical functions because this preserves the rhythm of natural speech.

=== Multisyllabic words ===
Words that have one syllable will be stressed determined by whether their function is cognitive or grammatical. Words that have more than one syllable are called multisyllabic words. Two-syllable words typically have one stressed and one unstressed syllable. However, many words in the English language have three or more syllables. In these cases, words often have more than one stress. A primary stress in a word is the strongest syllable with the highest pitch, longest duration, and loudest volume. A secondary stress is the weaker of the two, with its prosodic features falling between an unstressed and stressed syllable. Its pitch is higher than the tonic, but lower than the primary stress. The volume and duration of the secondary stress is similar to the primary stress, but not as prominent. Words with three or more syllables usually have an arrangement of primary, secondary, and unstressed syllables.

== Musical rhythm ==
Music and language are alike in that they both utilize rhythm to organize and convey ideas. Time signatures in music contain patterns of strong and weak beats. In every time signature, the first beat, or the downbeat, is the strongest. 4/4, 3/4, and 6/8 time are the most common time signatures in popular styles. In 4/4 time, four beats are present in one measure. The first beat is the strongest, with the third beat the second-strongest. The second beat is weak, with the fourth beat the weakest. In 3/4 time, three beats are present in one measure. The first beat is the strongest, and the second and third beats are weak. In 6/8 time, six beats are present in one measure. The first beat is the strongest, the fourth beat is second-strongest, and beats two, three, five, and six are weak.

These levels of strength are applied to the entire duration of the beat. Within the subdivisions of a beat, the same patterns of strength are present, but in a lower degree. A quarter note can be divided into two eighth notes The first eighth note is strong, the second is weak. A quarter note can be divided into four sixteenth notes. The first sixteenth note is the strongest, followed by the third, with the second sixteenth weak and the fourth the weakest. The same concept applies to eighth-note triplets. The first eighth note is the strongest, while the second and third eighth notes are weak. Recognizing strong and weak rhythmic patterns is essential during the process of proper lyric setting.

The suprasegmentals earlier discussed regarding speech can also be applied to strong and weak beats of a measure. The strength of a beat is identifiable through its prominence, or force. The strong beats always have the most prominence, and can match the strength of a stressed syllable’s suprasegmentals. These features can be enhanced by percussion instruments through the dynamics (volume), tone, timbre, or duration.

== Proper lyric setting ==
Lyric setting is the process of properly aligning lyrical content in the context of musical rhythm. Proper lyric setting preserves the natural shape of the language and promotes prosody. This involves a melody to which the lyrics are paired, so that it is sung as one unit. A melody is defined as a "succession of tones comprised of mode, rhythm, and pitches so arranged as to achieve musical shape, being perceived as a unity by the mind."

Each syllable of a lyrical phrase is joined to one musical note to create the melody. Stressed and unstressed syllables within a phrase create a rhythmic pattern that is then matched to the strong and weak beats of musical rhythm. When setting lyrics, the natural accents of everyday speech are taken into consideration. Imposing an unsuited rhythm onto the lyrics for the sake of matching it to a melody does not preserve the natural shape of the language and is improper lyric setting.

=== Meter-beat relationship ===
Within a lyrical phrase, stressed syllables occur in strong positions of the measure because they hold the most meaning. For instance, in 4/4 time, stressed syllables are placed on the first and third beat of the measure, or any subdivision of a beat that is considered strong. The reason why this proper placement of lyric-to-beat creates prosody is because the accents of strong beats support, mirror, and enhance the suprasegmentals of stressed syllables, which have a higher intensity, force, and prominence that only strong beats can match. These two elements working together simultaneously helps the lyrical content sound as natural as possible.

Unstressed syllables occur in the weak positions of the bar. They are placed in weak positions because they do not hold meaning. For instance, in 4/4 time, these syllables are placed in the second and fourth beats of the bar, or any subdivision of a beat that is considered weak. Unstressed syllables are placed on the second eighth note of any quarter-note beat. The suprasegmentals of unstressed syllables and weak beats fit together because both have a lack of intensity, force, and prominence. If unstressed syllables are set on strong beats, the lyrical content sounds unnatural and suffers a loss of meaning. The unstressed syllables are placed on weak beats in order to embrace the most authentic meaning of the lyric.

The Secondary stresses are placed on strong beats, but must maintain a secondary position relative to the primary stresses. The primary stress lands on a stronger beat than the secondary stress. In addition, lyric setting is all proportionate to whatever subdivisions have already been established within a measure.

Such is the case in 3/4 time, in which the downbeat is the only strong beat. Although the second and third beats are considered weak, they are actually eligible for stressed syllables if the beats are subdivided into eighth notes. In this instance, there is a contrast established between the strong and weak eighth notes. The unstressed syllables fall on the second eighth note of a quarter-note beat. The accent of the downbeat is always strongest, so it's crucial not to ignore its importance.

In 6/8 time, the stressed syllables are placed on the first and fourth beats. The unstressed syllables are placed on the second, third, fifth, or sixth beats. When using duple meter in 6/8 time, the stressed syllables are placed on the first and fourth beats. Unstressed syllables are placed on the second, third, fifth, or sixth beats. Note that triplet time signatures can accommodate both duple and triple meter lyrical content.

=== Natural contour ===
Recognizing suprasegmentals in a lyric gives an extra representation of the natural contour of language in the song. For instance, because a stressed syllable reaches a higher pitch, some might decide to represent this idea musically by assigning it to a higher pitch in the melody. This is not an essential factor for proper lyric setting, but it has the potential to preserve the natural contour of the language. This could be especially true for the lyric setting of questions. In this type of sentence, the last syllable typically rises at the end to indicate that it is a question. Some syllables, that would otherwise maintain a tonic pitch, may naturally reach to the pitch of a stressed syllable in the context of a question. Taking this into account, a songwriter may decide to preserve the contour of the question in the pitch of the lyric.

One also might consider the duration of stressed vs. unstressed syllables and apply this concept to musical rhythm, assigning a longer note value to a stressed syllable and a shorter note value to an unstressed syllable within the melody. It is not essential, however, to use duration to create a proper lyric setting. The natural contour of the language could potentially be represented in the music more prominently if the duration were taken into account.

Dynamics are typically up to interpretation by the vocalist of the song. The songwriter may choose to emphasize stressed syllables with louder dynamics and unstressed syllables with softer dynamics. However, this is not an essential factor in lyric setting either.

These suprasegmentals are utilized solely for special effect to enhance meaning on a specific word, phrase, or section, instead of to enhance the technical qualities of stressed and unstressed syllables. Using suprasegmentals in this way is another aspect of setting lyrics to create prosody and to preserve the natural emotion of the lyrical content.

=== Effects ===
The ultimate goal in songwriting is to create an emotional connection with the listener. Proper lyric setting is an essential tool in achieving that goal. When all stressed and unstressed syllables take their rightful places, the song takes its most natural form. Although emotions may appear as though a mere happenstance, it is the technical tools such as proper lyric setting that are working behind the scenes to maintain some of the basic building blocks a song needs in order to achieve prosody.

The effects of proper lyric setting are:

1. Words are easily recognized
2. Words are correctly understood
3. Words satisfy and embody their ultimate meaning
4. Words fulfill their full emotional potential

By satisfying these conditions, lyrical content achieves its highest state of relatability.

When a lyric is properly set, with its natural rhythms present in music, words are familiar and easily recognized by the listener. The goal is to avoid causing the audience to work overtime to identify words. The brain will automatically interpret a correctly set phrase as though it were spoken in a conversation. This is done quickly, immediately, and without much thought. Following the identification of a word comes the understanding of meaning, and which meaning the word is intending in the context of the song. If a lyric is not properly set, a word might be mistaken for a different word, or be completely unidentified. Songs are constantly moving forward, so there is little time for the listener to decipher words. By the time the listener identifies an improperly set lyric, the song has already moved onto new words and melodies. The mis-stressed word loses the opportunity to live up to its full meaning in context. When words are easily recognized and understood in a song, the chance of establishing an emotional connection to the listener is increased because it subconsciously creates a level of trust and expectation. Recognizability and understanding are two important factors that promote relatability.

A lyric’s meaning lives up to its full potential when the lyric stays true to its natural rhythm. Stressed syllables hold more meaning than unstressed syllables, and, therefore, are more important to the song’s message. Placing more important words on stronger, more prominent beats of a measure puts spotlights on their meanings, more effectively enhancing and communicating what the song is trying to say. This not only keeps the listener’s attention, but also ultimately activates lyrical tools such as metaphor and imagery. Nouns, verbs, adverbs, and adjectives, or words that serve the meaning or cognitive function, have the potential to access the listener’s personal memories through the senses. In this way, placing these words on strong beats of a measure not only encourages them to be noticed, but also increases the chances that the listener’s personal memories will be accessed, promoting relatability. When the listener notices likeness between their memories and lyrical content, an emotional connection is established, because of their ability to find representation for their own experiences. Through these means, proper lyric setting ensures that the message of a song will achieve its full emotional potential, which in turn achieves its highest state of relatability. In addition, there are other lyric setting tools that can alter the placement of lyrics to amplify different emotions and attitudes, while still preserving the natural shape of the language. These tools can be applied only after stressed and unstressed syllables have been identified and the emotional intentions for a lyric are decided.

=== Mis-stressed lyrics ===
While proper lyric setting has positive effects, improper lyric setting has negative effects. A mis-stressed lyric is a word with one or more stressed and/or unstressed syllables that do not properly align with the strong and weak beats of a measure, and, therefore, neither preserve the natural shape of the language nor promote prosody.

Mis-stressed lyrics in a song create:

- Distraction
- Confusion
- Misunderstanding
- Loss of meaning
- Loss of emotion

This leads to loss of relatability.

A mis-stressed lyric distracts the listener because it sounds out-of-place, illegitimate, and unnatural. It has the potential to cause confusion and misunderstanding in regards to both identifying words and recognizing their meanings. While proper lyric setting creates trust within the listener, the unfamiliarity of a mis-stressed word lessens the listener’s potential to gain trust. That is because mis-stressed lyrics lack conversational qualities. As mentioned previously, stressing a word incorrectly may cause it to be mistaken for a different word, or cause it to be completely unidentified. Musical time constantly moves forward, but the distraction and misunderstanding that mis-stressed lyrics cause slow down the listener’s thought process. By the time the listener can identify a mis-stressed word, the song has already moved onto new words and melodies, and the word can no longer live up to its full meaning in context. Most times, the listener’s focus will move forward with the song, latching onto new words and ideas that are easier to identify and recognize, leaving the mis-stressed word behind. Whether the lyric is identified by the listener or not, its meaning is lost due to the fact that it does not stay true to its original conversational rhythm.

Not only are words occasionally mis-stressed due to improper rhythmic placement, but also due to meaning, or lack thereof. The most of these situations takes place when setting grammatical functions. These parts of speech are generally considered unstressed. Placing grammatical functions in strong positions of the bar takes away from the attention that should be on words with meaning functions. By placing both stressed and unstressed syllables on strong positions of the bar, the rhythm is suggesting that the meanings of both are equally important. This is simply not true, however. The lyrics do not convey their ultimate meaning and emotion because the nouns, verbs, adverbs, and adjectives will have to share the spotlight with less important words. This lessens the listener’s ability to access personal memories through the senses, which in turn lessens the lyric’s emotional impact and relatability. To get the most out of lyrical content, the words with the most meaning are placed on the strongest beats. This also helps the listener subconsciously stay focused on what is most important about the song’s message.
