= St Joseph's School (Mzimpofu) =

St. Joseph's School

Location
- Mzimpofu, Manzini; Eswatini
- Coordinates: 26°27′34″S 31°28′31″E

Information
- Type: Public boarding school
- Religious affiliation: Catholicism
- Denomination: Servite Order
- Established: 1914; 112 years ago
- Founder: Fr Francis Mayr
- Locale: Rural

St Joseph's School is a public Catholic co-educational school, located in the rural settlement of Mzimpofu, in the Manzini region of Eswatini. The school is located on a Catholic mission complex run by the Servite Order (Order of Servants of Mary). St Joseph's is well known in Eswatini for integrating the education of students with disabilities with normally-abled students.

== History ==
St Joseph's School was founded in 1914 by an early Catholic missionary, Fr Francis Mayr. Mayr founded the mission to care for disabled and underprivileged people in the community. In October 1914, Fr Mayr was murdered by Fanyana Mdluli, who was later ordered by Queen Labotsibeni to be executed through hanging.

For over fifty years, Fr Angelo 'Nkomiyahlaba' Ciccone served as the vicar of the mission and supervised the development of its services for the disabled. In 2016, Ciccone was killed on a car accident.

== Components of the school ==
The school has included a number of facilities that contribute to the education of disabled students as well as the community in general. The general educational programme integrates disabled students in the primary and secondary schools, with boarding facilities serving many of the disabled students. The Ekululameni Vocational Rehabilitation Centre provides training for disabled adults. Formerly, the Embelekweni pre-school provided care for children aged 0 to 5, many of whom had severe and multiple disabilities. Programs were significantly financed by the German Development Organisation Christoffel Blindenmission. The Zama center provides services for students with severe intellectual disabilities. A resource center on campus provides braille transcription services for blind students who are integrated in the primary and secondary schools. Some funding for the educational programs comes from the Swazi government with significant additional funding coming from Kindernothilfe, a German non-governmental organization and Christoffel Blindenmission/Germany known as CBM.
