= HIGCSE =

Educational qualification

The Higher International General Certificate of Secondary Education (HIGCSE) was a certification offered by Cambridge University for various subjects. It was designed for Southern Africa and offered by many public, private and homeschooling organisations.

It was considered to be equivalent to matric in most countries, but was generally at AS-Level standard and could be used to enter into some universities around the world, including Cambridge University. A student could go on to study a subject on A2 after acquiring an HIGCSE qualification in that subject (a small bridging course is required in some cases).

In 2007, the HIGCSE, along with the IGCSE, was gradually discontinued by Namibia's Ministry of Education and replaced with the Namibia Senior Secondary Certificate (NSSC).
