= Gwamile Vocational and Commercial Training Institute =

University in Kwaluseni, Eswatini

Coordinates: 26°29′13″S 31°18′13″E

Gwamile Vocational and Commercial Training Institute is one of the principal institutes of higher learning in Eswatini. It was founded in 1987 under the auspices of the German Technical Cooperation Agency (GTZ) and the Eswatini Government. The campus is located in Kwaluseni, in the center of the country, two kilometers from the University of Eswatini. The school is known as Gwamile Voctim.

== Programs ==
Gwamile Voctim currently offers the following programs:

- Automotive Engineering
- Commercial Studies
- Electrical Engineering
- Mechanical Engineering
- Trowel Trades
- Wood Trades
