= Eswatini College of Technology =

Higher education institution in Eswatini

- Likolishi letebuchwephesha Eswatini
- Other name: ECOT
- Motto: Looking to the future
- Established: 1946
- Affiliations: Ministry of Education and Training
- Academic affiliations: Vaal University of Technology, University of Eswatini
- Principal: Nomcebo M.F Nhlengetfwa
- Students: 800+
- Location: SOMHLOLO MAIN ROAD, MBABANE ESWATINI, Mbabane, Sandla Mbabane, P.O BOX 69, MBABANE (POSTAL CODE H100), Eswatini; 26.309°S 31.122°E
- Campus: Suburban
- Website: https://www.ecot.ac.sz/

Eswatini College of Technology, also referred to a ECOT, is a state-owned college in Eswatini. It offers courses in engineering, science and education. Nomcebo M.F Nhlengetfwa is the current principal of the college. In 2011, the college collaborated with Vaal University of Technology in South Africa.
