= Eswatini =

Country in Southern Africa

Kingdom of Eswatini Umbuso weSwatini (Swazi)
- Flag Coat of arms
- Motto: "Siyinqaba" (Swazi) "We are the fortress"
- Anthem: "Nkulunkulu Mnikati wetibusiso temaSwati" "Oh God, Giver of Blessings to the Swazi"
- Capital: Mbabane (executive); Lobamba (legislative); 26°30′S 31°30′E
- Largest city: Mbabane
- Official languages: Swazi; English
- Ethnic groups (2017): 97% Emaswati; 3% others
- Religion (2017): 89.3% Christianity; 84.2% Protestantism; 3.7% Roman Catholic; 1.4% other Christian; 7.4% no religion; 2.5% traditional faiths; 0.8% others
- Demonym: Swazi (Note: In the Swazi language, emaSwati (plural) and liSwati (singular) are used.)
- Government: Unitary diarchic absolute monarchy
  - King: Mswati III
  - Queen Mother: Ntfombi
  - Prime Minister: Russell Dlamini
  - Chief Justice: Vacant
- Legislature: Parliament
  - Upper house: Senate
  - Lower house: House of Assembly

Independence from the United Kingdom
  - Independence granted: 6 September 1968
  - United Nations membership: 24 September 1968
  - Current constitution: 2005
  - Renaming: 19 April 2018

Area
  - Total: 17,364 km^{2} (6,704 sq mi) (153rd)
  - Water (%): 0.9

Population
  - 2023 estimate: ▲1,236,126 (155th)
  - 2017 census: 1,093,238
  - Density: 66.8/km^{2} (173.0/sq mi) (135th)
- GDP (PPP): 2027 estimate
  - Total: ▲$16.820 billion (158th)
  - Per capita: ▲$13,853 (113th)
- GDP (nominal): 2027 estimate
  - Total: ▲$5.591 billion (168th)
  - Per capita: ▲$4,604 (125th)
- Gini (2016): ▲54.6 high inequality
- HDI (2023): 0.695 medium (126th)
- Currency: Lilangeni (SZL); South African rand (ZAR)
- Time zone: UTC+2 (SAST)
- Calling code: +268
- ISO 3166 code: SZ
- Internet TLD: .sz
- Website www.gov.sz

Swati (Swazi)
- Person: liSwati
- People: emaSwati
- Language: siSwati
- Country: eSwatini

Eswatini, (Note: /ˌɛswɑːˈtiːni/ ESS-wah-TEE-nee; Swazi: eSwatini [ɛswáˈtʼiːni]) formally the Kingdom of Eswatini (historically called KaNgwane), also known by its former official names Swaziland (Note: /ˈswɑːzilænd/ SWAH-zee-land) and the Kingdom of Swaziland, is a landlocked country in Southern Africa. It is bordered by South Africa on all sides except the east, where it shares a border with Mozambique. At no more than 200 km (120 mi) north to south and 130 km (81 mi) east to west, Eswatini is the second smallest country in continental Africa. However, its climate and topography are diverse, ranging from a cool and mountainous highveld to a hot and dry lowveld. The executive capital is Mbabane, and the legislative capital is Lobamba.

The population is composed primarily of ethnic Swazis. The prevalent language is Swazi (siSwati in native form). The Swazis established their kingdom in the mid-18th century under the leadership of Ngwane III. The country and the Swazi take their names from Mswati II, the 19th-century king under whose rule the country was expanded and unified. Its boundaries were drawn up in 1881 in the midst of the European Scramble for Africa.

After the Second Boer War, the kingdom, under the name of Swaziland, was a British high commission territory from 1903 until it regained its full independence on 6 September 1968. In April 2018, the king changed the official name from Kingdom of Swaziland to Kingdom of Eswatini, the name commonly used in the Swazi language.

Eswatini is a developing country that is classified as having a lower-middle income economy. As a member of the Southern African Customs Union and the Common Market for Eastern and Southern Africa, its main local trading partner is South Africa; to ensure economic stability, Eswatini's currency, the lilangeni, is pegged to the South African rand. Eswatini's major overseas trading partners are the United States and the European Union. The majority of the country's employment is provided by its agricultural and manufacturing sectors. Eswatini is a member of the Southern African Development Community, the African Union, the Commonwealth of Nations, and the United Nations.

Eswatini's government is an absolute monarchy, the last of its kind in Africa. The country has been ruled by King Mswati III since 1986. Elections are held every five years to determine the House of Assembly and the Senate majority, but political parties are prohibited from running. Eswatini's constitution was adopted in 2005.

The Swazi population faces major health issues: HIV/AIDS and (to a lesser extent) tuberculosis are widespread. Twenty-eight percent of the adult population are HIV-positive. As of 2018, Eswatini has the 12th-lowest life expectancy in the world, at 58 years. Also as of 2018, people aged 14 years or younger constitute 35% of the country's population; the median age is 22 years.

== History ==
Artifacts have been found indicating human activity dating back to the Early Stone Age, around 200,000 years ago. Prehistoric rock art paintings dating from as far back as c. 27,000 years ago to as recently as the 19th century can be found around the country.

The earliest known inhabitants of the region were Khoisan hunter-gatherers. They were largely replaced by the Nguni during the great Bantu migrations. These peoples originated from the Great Lakes region of eastern and central Africa. Evidence of agriculture and iron use dates from about the 4th century. People speaking languages ancestral to the current Sotho and Nguni languages began settling no later than the 11th century. Historically, the Bantu-speaking people of the southern part of Africa came from the Katanga direction and continued to expand to the south along the east coast of Africa. The Swazi people settled in the area between the Drakensberg Mountains and the Indian Ocean, and like other Bantu-speaking communities, they brought with them cattle, seeds to cultivate and handmade iron, wood, animal skin and clay products.

The Swazi trace their origins to the Embo-Dlamini, a branch of the Embo-Nguni that originally settled in Tembeland, near present-day Delagoa Bay (Maputo) in Mozambique during the Bantu expansion. Within the Tembe territories, the Embo people were a small chiefdom led by Chief Langa.

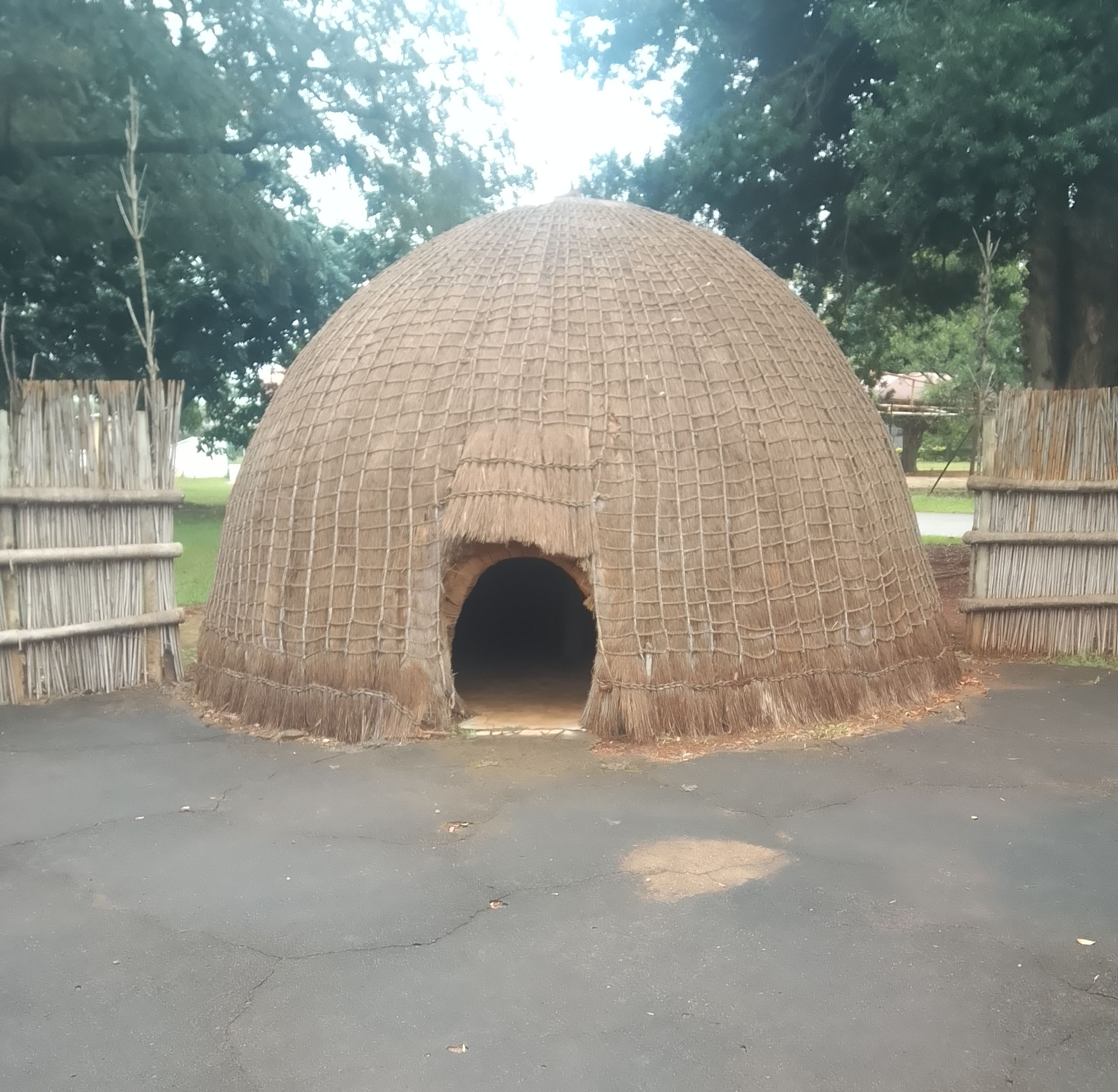
A Swazi traditional house displayed at the Eswatini National Museum, Lobamba

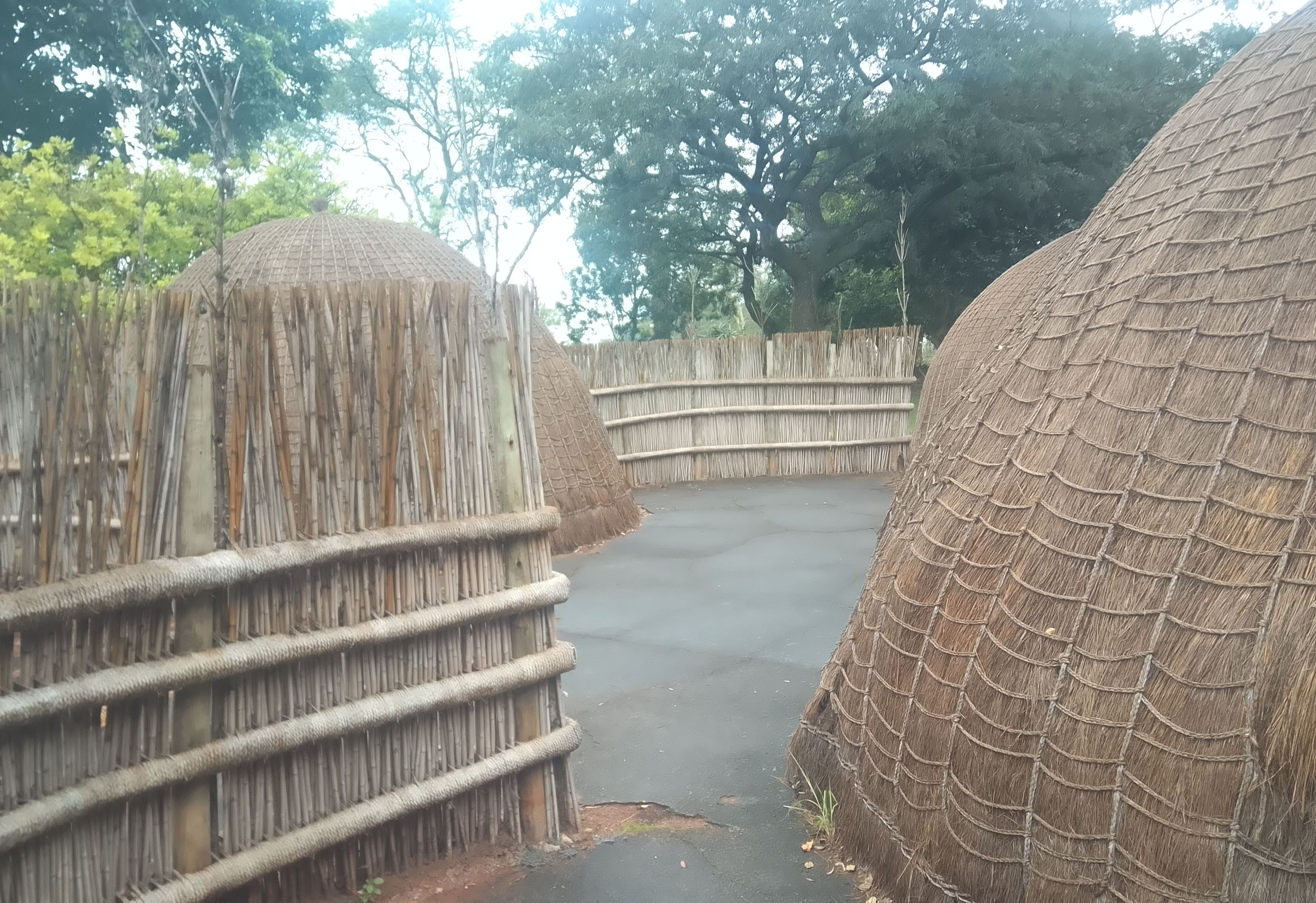
A traditional Swazi home

Most Nguni-speaking communities, including the Embo, were identified by their cattle-based economy, crop farming and strategic settlement near water sources.

Nineteenth-century British colonial records also linked the Tembe and Swazi chieftaincies. One document noted: “We observe that the words Kings are intended to signify the Kings of Swazi and Tembe.”

Portuguese in 1589 recorded meeting a group of people in the Limpopo River region who called themselves "Vhambedzi" or "BaMbo". Historian J.S.M. Matsebula states that these were earlier forms of the present day Swazi people who were identified by their use of reeds in the Zambezi River, which, he writes, "infers that the Swazi people arrived in southern Africa through the use of reeds to cross the Zambezi (Vhambedzi) River". This is also evidenced in their praise names: ..tsine lesavela eluhlangeni ("..we originated from the reeds") and nine beluhlanga ("you of the reeds") referring to the Dlamini clan. The Vhambedzi or Vhambo were the Embo during their gradual movement southward to the Maputaland-Lubombo region.

In the Crocodile River region, the Nguni separated into Ntungwa-Nguni and Embo-Nguni (also called Tekela-Nguni), the later which evolved into Embo-Dlamini, the earliest form of the current Swazi people. The Embo-Nguni continued with their movement southward until they reached Delagoa Bay (Maputo) between the Lubombo Mountains and Indian Ocean, becoming one of the small chiefdoms under the Nyaka east of the Maputo River and the Tembe west of the river.

=== Swazi settlers (18th and 19th centuries) ===
The Swazi, before they moved and settled in the Pongola River in attempting to be independent, had for many years been settled in the Tembe River and submitted to Tembe chiefs who had influence across the Lubombo Mountains and southwards to the Lusutfu River. Dlamini III was a king or iNgwenyama of the Swazi people and he led them approximately between 1720 until 1744 and worked closely with his adviser Chief Mbokane. King Dlamini III was the father to Ngwane III, the first King of modern Swaziland and after whom the country was named KaNgwane ("country of Ngwane") and his people becoming known as BakaNgwane ("people of Ngwane "). Continuing conflict with the Ndwandwe people pushed them further north, with Ngwane III establishing his capital at Shiselweni at the foot of the Mhlosheni hills. Under Sobhuza I, the Ngwane people established their capital at Zombodze in the heartland of present-day Eswatini. In this process, they conquered and incorporated the long established clans of the country known to the Swazi as Emakhandzambili (those found ahead).

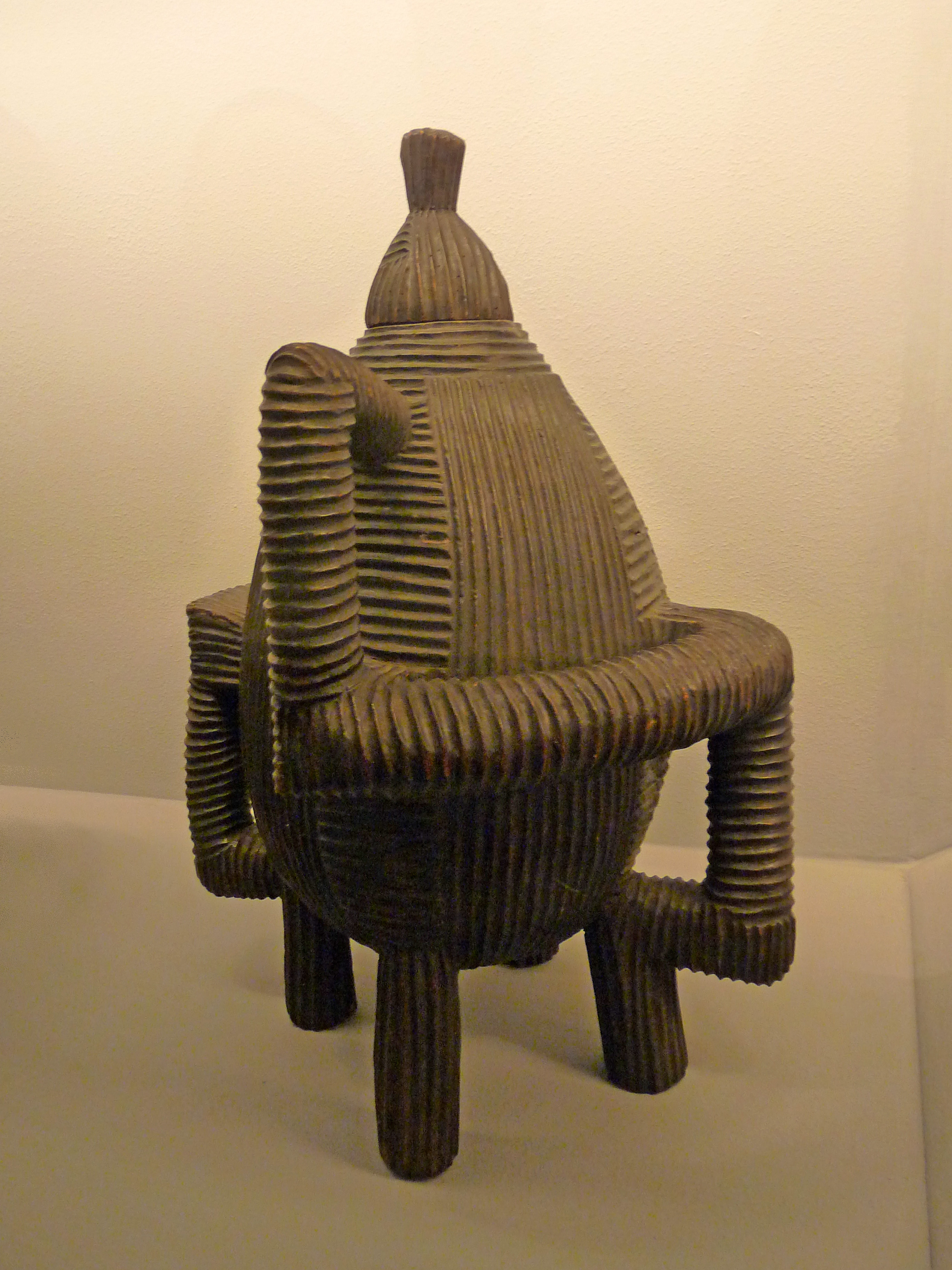
A 19th-century Swazi container, carved in wood

The names "Swaziland" and "Eswatini" both derive from a later king named Mswati II. KaNgwane, named for Ngwane III, is an alternative name for Eswatini, the surname of whose royal house remains Nkhosi Dlamini. Mswati II was the greatest of the fighting kings of Swaziland, and he greatly extended the area of the country to twice its current size. The Emakhandzambili clans were initially incorporated into the kingdom with wide autonomy, often including grants of special ritual and political status. The extent of their autonomy, however, was drastically curtailed by Mswati, who attacked and subdued some of them in the 1850s. With his power, Mswati greatly reduced the influence of the Emakhandzambili while incorporating more people into his kingdom either through conquest or by giving them refuge. These later arrivals became known to the Swazis as Emafikamuva.

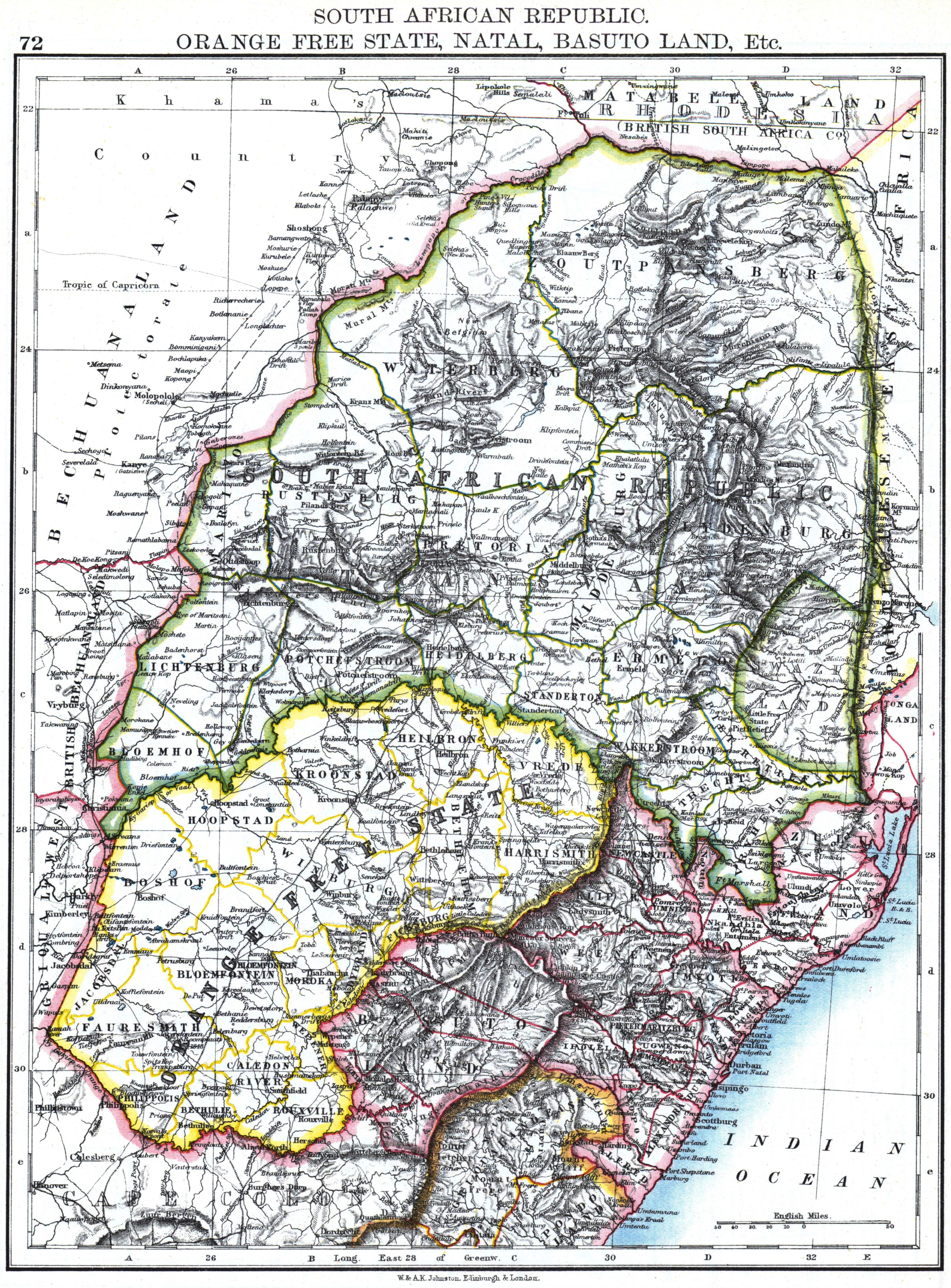
Swaziland in Southern Africa, Johnston & Johnston, Edinburgh, 1897.

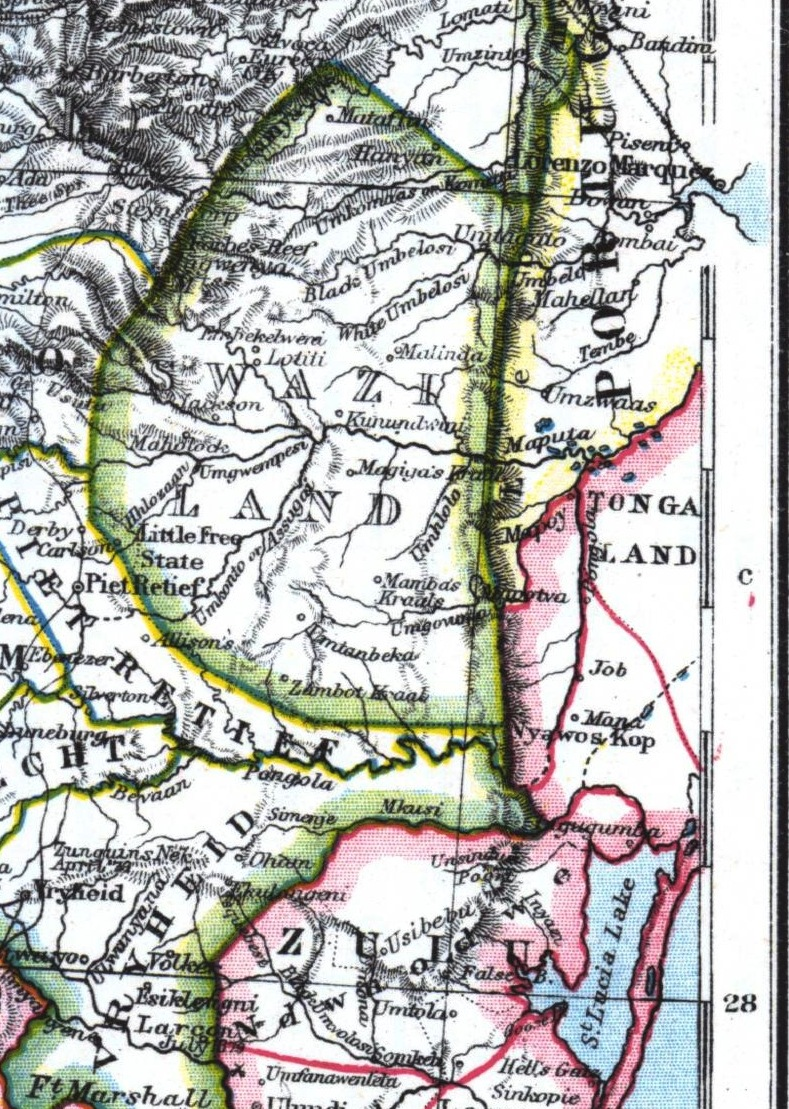
Swaziland, detail from Johnston & Johnston map (Edinburgh, 1897). Black and White Umbelosi rivers and settlements such as Malinda, Kunudwini and Lotiti are indicated.

The autonomy of the Swazi nation was influenced by British and Dutch rule of southern Africa in the 19th and early 20th centuries. In 1881, the British government signed a convention recognising Swazi independence, despite the Scramble for Africa that was taking place at the time. This independence was also recognised in the London Convention of 1884.

King Mbandzeni created a complex pattern of land ownership by granting many concessions to Europeans. During the concessions some of the King's senior chiefs like Chief Ntengu Mbokane got permission to relocate to farms towards the Lubombo region, in the modern-day city of Nsoko. Others like Mshiza Maseko relocated to farms towards the Komati River in the place called eLuvalweni. The concessions included grants and leases for agriculture and grazing. In 1890, following the death of Mbandzeni, a Swaziland Convention created a Chief Court to determine disputes about controversial land and mineral rights and other concessions.

Swaziland was given a triumviral administration in 1890, representing the British, the Dutch republics, and the Swazi people. In 1894, a convention placed Swaziland under the South African Republic as a protectorate. This continued under the rule of Ngwane V until the outbreak of the Second Boer War in October 1899.

King Ngwane V died in December 1899, during incwala, after the outbreak of the Second Boer War. His successor, Sobhuza II, was four months old. Swaziland was indirectly involved in the war with various skirmishes between the British and the Boers occurring in the country until 1902.

=== British indirect rule over Swaziland (1906–1968) ===
In 1903, after the British victory in the Second Boer War, Swaziland became one of the British "High Commission Territories", the others being Basutoland (now Lesotho) and Bechuanaland (now Botswana), although a protectorate was not established because terms had not been agreed with the Swazi Queen Regent Labotsibeni Mdluli.

The Swaziland Administration Proclamation of 1904 established a commission with the task of examining all the concessions and defining their boundaries. This work was finished by 1907, and the Swaziland Concessions Partition Proclamation provided for a concessions partition commissioner to be appointed to set aside areas for the sole use and occupation of the Swazis. The commissioner had the power to expropriate up to one third of each concession without compensation, but payment would need to be made if more than a third was taken. In the event, in 1910 he completed his work and set aside 1,639,687 acres, some 38% of Swaziland's area, for the Swazi. The queen regent then encouraged the Swazi to go to work in the Transvaal to earn money to buy more land from the Europeans.

Much of the early administration of the territory (for example, postal services) was carried out from South Africa until 1906, when the Transvaal Colony was granted self-government. A British high commissioner had some of the functions of a governor, but the Swazis were self-governing on their reserves, and the territory was not deemed to be a British possession. Sobhuza's official coronation as king was in December 1921 after the regency of Labotsibeni, after which he led an unsuccessful deputation to the Judicial Committee of the Privy Council of the United Kingdom in London in 1922 regarding the issue of the land.

In the period between 1923 and 1963, Sobhuza II established the Swazi Commercial Amadoda which was to grant licences to small businesses on the Swazi reserves and also established the Swazi National School to counter the dominance of the missions in education. His stature grew with time, and the Swazi royal leadership was successful in resisting the weakening power of the British administration and the possibility of the incorporation of Swaziland into the Union of South Africa.

The constitution for independent Swaziland was promulgated by Britain in November 1963 under the terms of which a Legislative Council and an Executive Council were established. This development was opposed by the king's Swazi National Council (Liqoqo). Despite such opposition, elections took place, and the first Legislative Council was constituted on 9 September 1964. By 1964, the area of the country reserved for occupation by the Swazi had increased to 56%. Changes to the original constitution proposed by the Legislative Council were accepted by Britain and a new constitution providing for a House of Assembly and Senate was drawn up. Elections under this constitution were held in 1967. Following the 1967 elections, Swaziland was a protected state until independence was regained in 1968.

=== Independence (since 1968) ===
Following the elections of 1972, the constitution of Swaziland was suspended by King Sobhuza II who thereafter ruled the country by decree until his death in 1982. At that point, Sobhuza II had been king of Swaziland for almost 83 years, making him the longest-reigning monarch in history. A regency followed his death, with Queen Regent Dzeliwe Shongwe as head of state until 1984 when she was removed by the Liqoqo and replaced by Queen Mother Ntfombi Tfwala. Mswati III, the son of Ntfombi, was crowned in 1986 as king and ngwenyama of Swaziland.

An attempt to transfer neighbouring parts of South Africa, more precisely parts of the Zulu homeland of KwaZulu and parts of the Swazi homeland of KaNgwane, to Swaziland in 1982 was never realised. This would have given land-locked Swaziland access to the sea. The deal was negotiated by the governments of South Africa and Swaziland, but was met by popular opposition in the territory meant to be transferred. The territory had been claimed by Sobhuza II as part of the Swazi monarchs' traditional realm, and the South African government hoped to use the area as a buffer zone against guerrilla infiltration from Mozambique. (The South African government responded to the failure of the transfer by temporarily suspending the autonomy of KaNgwane.)

The 1990s saw a rise in student and labour protests calling on the king to introduce reforms. Thus, progress towards constitutional reforms began, culminating with the introduction of the current Swazi constitution in 2005. This happened despite objections by political activists. The current constitution does not clearly deal with the status of political parties. The first election under the constitution took place in 2008. Members of Parliament (MPs) were elected from 55 constituencies (also known as tinkhundla). These MPs served five-year terms which ended in 2013. In 2011, Swaziland suffered an economic crisis which was caused by reduced Southern African Customs Union (SACU) receipts. This caused the government to request a loan from neighbouring South Africa. However, they did not agree with the conditions of the loan, which included political reforms.

During this period, there was increased pressure on the Swazi government to carry out more reforms. Public protests by civic organisations and trade unions became more common. Starting in 2012, improvements in SACU receipts eased the fiscal pressure on the Swazi government. A new parliament, the second since the promulgation of the constitution, was elected in 2013. The king then reappointed Sibusiso Dlamini as prime minister for the third time.

On 19 April 2018, Mswati III announced that the Kingdom of Swaziland had been renamed as the Kingdom of Eswatini, reflecting the extant Swazi name for the state eSwatini, to mark the 50th anniversary of Swazi independence. The name Eswatini means "land of the Swazis" in the Swazi language and was partially intended to prevent confusion with the similarly named Switzerland.

Eswatini workers began anti-government protests against low salaries in September 2018. They went on a three-day strike organised by the Trade Union Congress of Eswatini that resulted in widespread disruption. In June 2021, pro-democracy protests broke out across the country, sparking riots, looting, and street skirmishes with police and soldiers. This civil unrest began as a result of years of anger towards the lack of meaningful reforms that would nudge Eswatini in the direction of democracy, as well as the government's reported banning of the submission of petitions. Numerous buildings said to be connected to King Mswati III were torched by protesters, and police reportedly assaulted and arrested political opponents. The New York Times called the turmoil in the landlocked nation "the most explosive civil unrest in its 53 years of independence". At least 20 people were killed by state security forces and dozens more injured and detained. The government shut down the Internet (with the compliance of mobile providers MTN and Eswatini Mobile) making it difficult to access reliable news from the country. The king was also said to have fled the country, though government officials disputed those claims, also calling for an end to the protests.

== Geography ==
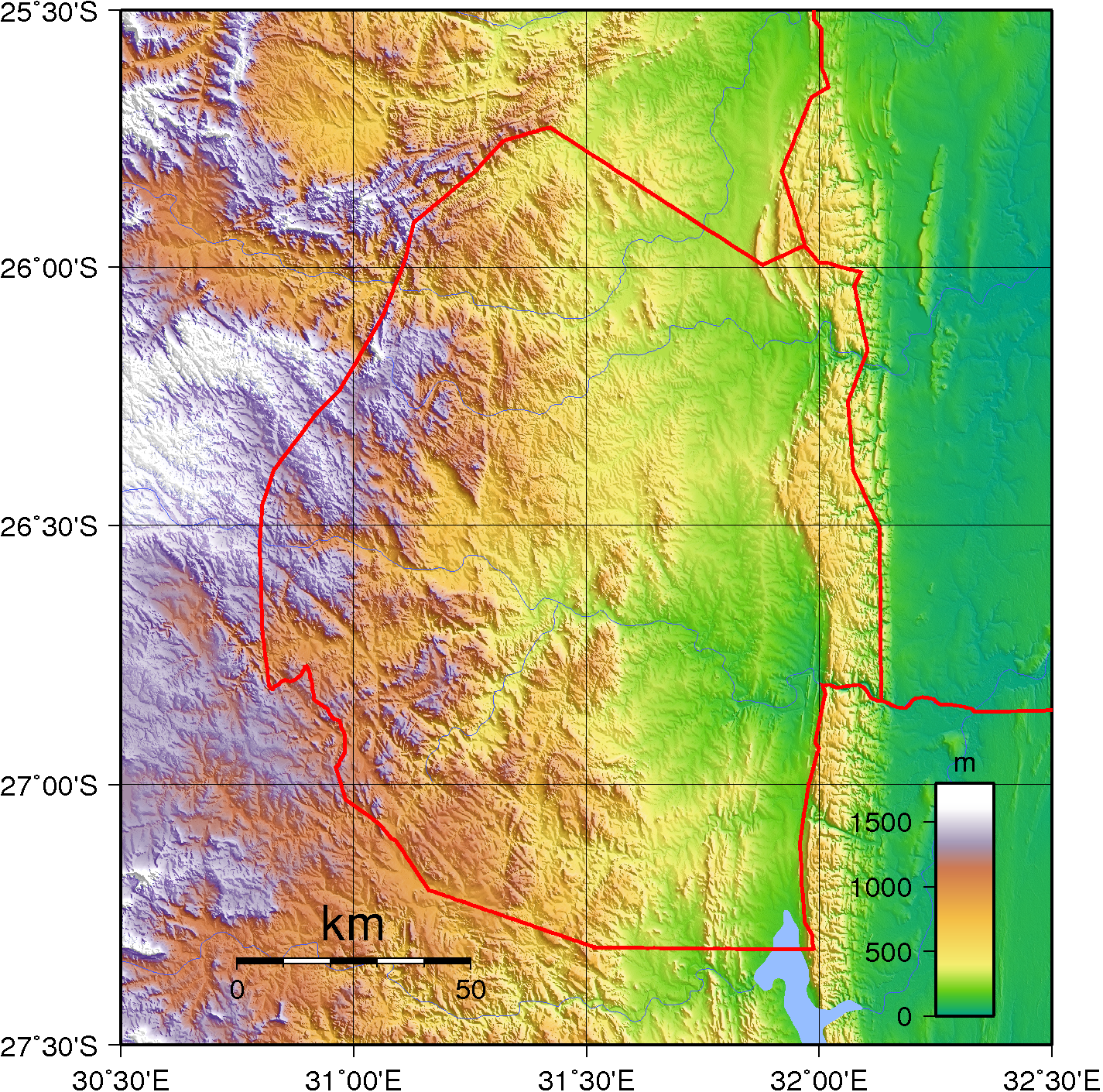
Topographic map of Eswatini

A small landlocked kingdom with an area of 17,364 km^{2} (6,704 sq mi), Eswatini is located at roughly 26°30'S, 31°30'E and is bordered in the north, west, and south by South Africa and by Mozambique in the east. Along the eastern border with Mozambique are the Lebombo Mountains, a mountain ridge at an altitude around 600 metres (2,000 ft). The mountains are broken by the canyons of three rivers, the Ngwavuma, the Great Usutu, and the Mbuluzi. The western border, with an average altitude of 1,200 metres (3,900 ft), lies on the edge of an escarpment.

Eswatini is separated into four geographical regions. These run from north to south and are determined by elevation. Mbabane, the capital, is on the Highveld. The Middleveld, lying around 700 metres (2,300 ft) above sea level, is the most densely populated region of Eswatini with a lower rainfall than the mountains. Manzini, the principal commercial and industrial city, is situated in the Middleveld. The Lowveld, around 250 metres (820 ft), is less populated than other areas and presents a typical African bush country of thorn trees and grasslands. Eswatini contains three ecosystems: Maputaland coastal forest mosaic, Zambezian and mopane woodlands, and Drakensberg montane grasslands. The country had a 2018 Forest Landscape Integrity Index mean score of 4.21/10, ranking it 142nd globally out of 172 countries.

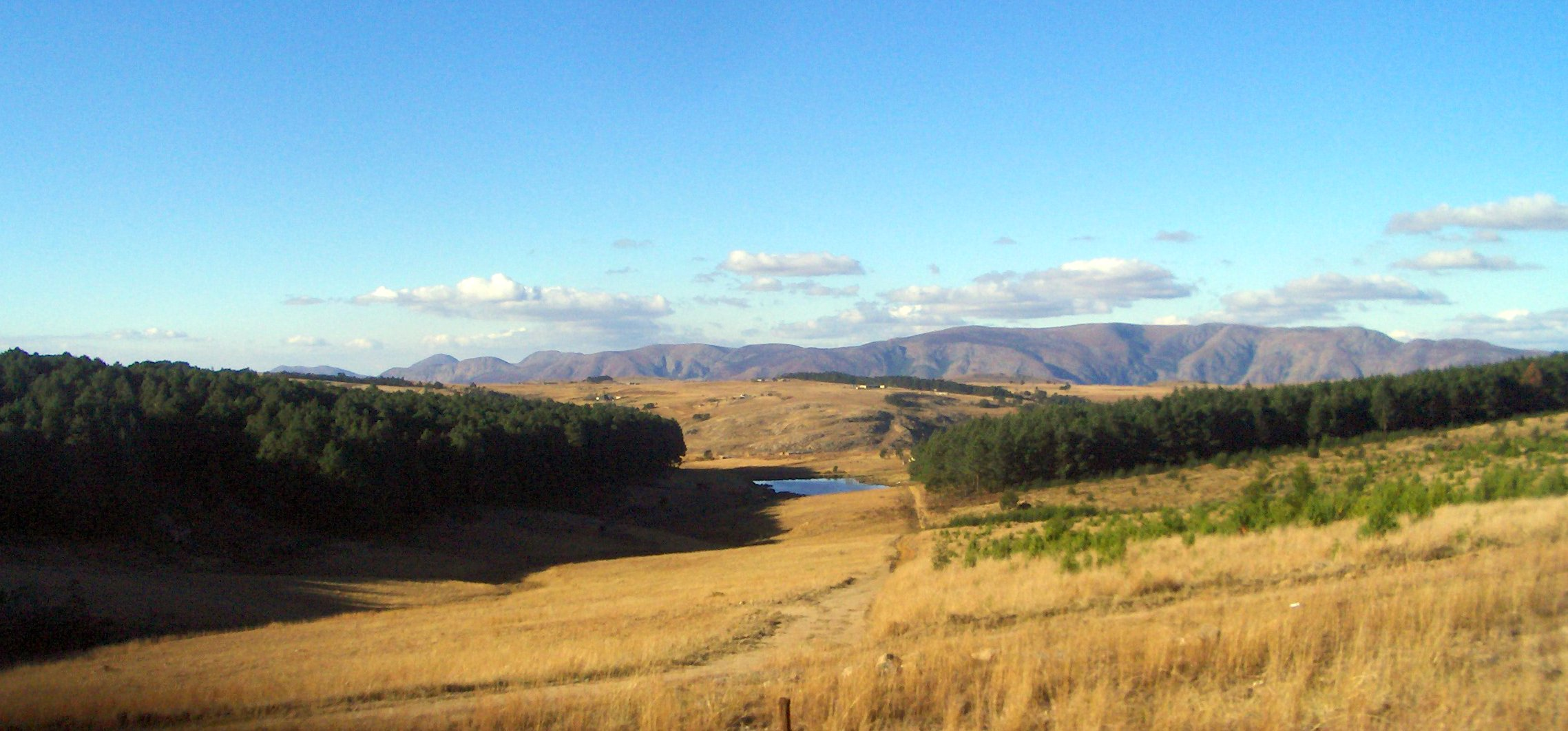
Landscape in Eswatini

=== Climate ===
Eswatini is divided into four climatic regions: the Highveld, Middleveld, Lowveld, and Lubombo plateau. Generally speaking, rain falls mostly during the summer months (December to March), often in the form of thunderstorms. Winter is the dry season. Annual rainfall is highest on the Highveld in the west, between 700 and 1,550 mm (27.6 and 61.0 in). The further east, the less rain, with the Lowveld recording 200 to 550 mm (7.9 to 21.7 in) per annum. Variations in temperature are also related to the altitude of the different regions. The Highveld temperature is temperate and seldom uncomfortably hot, while the Lowveld may record temperatures around 40 °C (104 °F) in summer.

The average temperatures at Mbabane, according to the season:

Spring	September–October	18 °C (64.4 °F)
Summer	November–March	20 °C (68 °F)
Autumn	April–May	17 °C (62.6 °F)
Winter	June–August	13 °C (55.4 °F)

The government of Eswatini has expressed concern that climate change is exacerbating existing social challenges such as poverty, a high HIV prevalence, and food insecurity and will drastically restrict the country's ability to develop, as per Vision 2022. Economically, climate change has already adversely impacted Eswatini. For instance, the 2015–16 drought decreased sugar and soft drink concentrate production export (Eswatini's largest economic export). Many of Eswatini's major exports are raw agricultural products and are therefore vulnerable to a changing climate.

=== Biodiversity and conservation ===
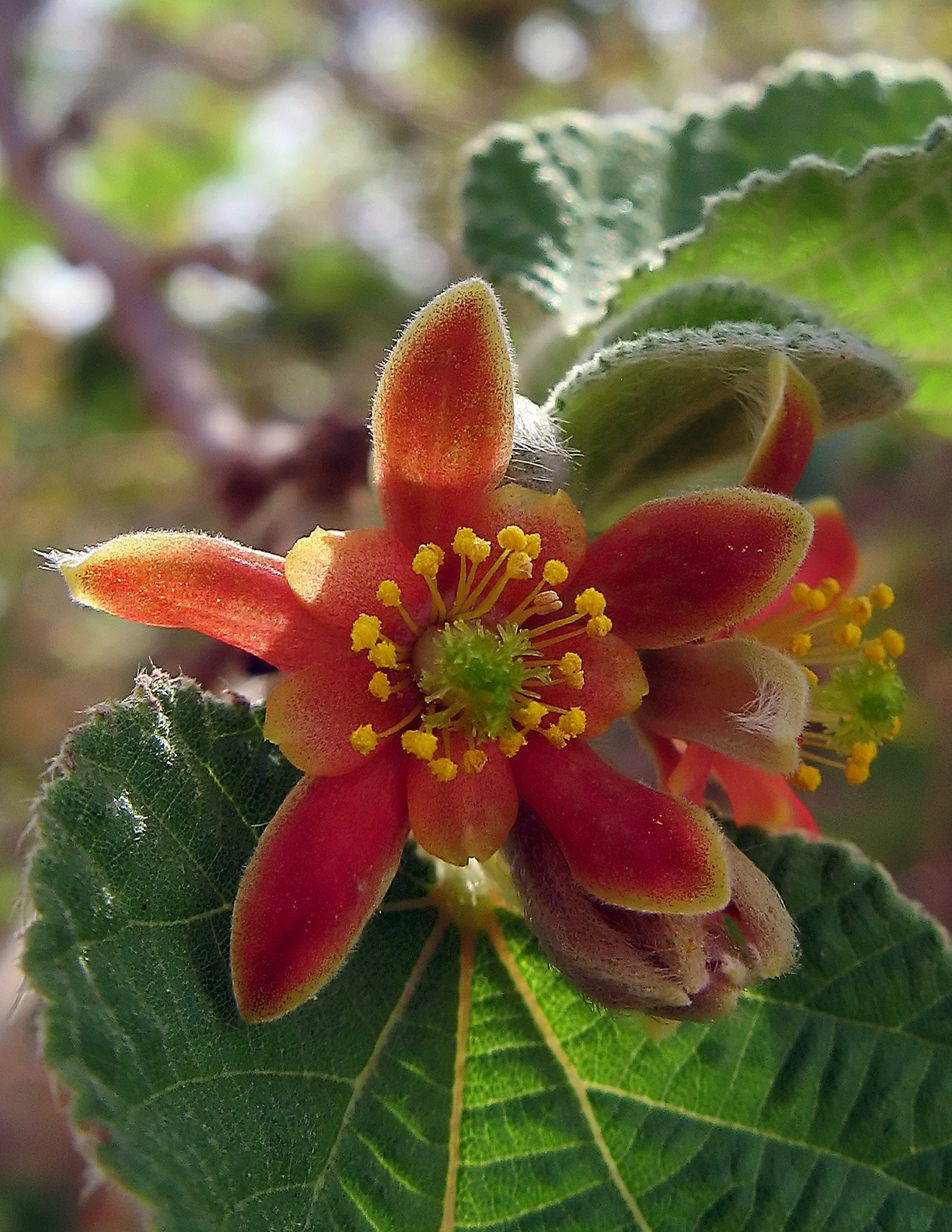
Grewia villosa

Eswatini has a spectrum of formal and informal conservation areas that protect the nation's rich biological diversity. These areas comprise about 5% of the country's land area. Eswatini has over 820 species of vertebrates and over 2,400 species of plants, with many endemic species. This diversity suggests Eswatini is globally important for biodiversity conservation. Land degradation and conversion to other land uses are the major threats to biodiversity, including plantation agriculture (legal and illegal), bush-clearing, the spread of alien and invasive plants, and unsustainable resource harvesting; major land fragmentation is evident.

Eswatini is a signatory to the Convention on Biological Diversity, the Convention on International Trade in Endangered Species (CITES), and the United National Framework Convention on Climate Change. There are three main government ministries responsible for national biodiversity management: the Eswatini National Trust Commission, the Eswatini Environment Authority, and the Ministry of Agriculture and Cooperatives. In addition, Big Game Parks, a private entity, is tasked with the management of the Game Act, which controls wildlife and CITES.

There are six formal and more than 10 informal protected areas in the country. The formally gazetted areas include: Malolotja Nature Reserve, Mantenga Nature Reserve, Mlawula Nature Reserve, Mlilwane Wildlife Sanctuary, and Mkhaya Game Reserve, and Hlane Royal National Park. In addition to these, there are many private and community nature reserves, as well as some with mixed governance structures. These include: Dombeya Game Reserve, Mbuluzi Game Reserve, Shewula Nature Reserve, Phophonyane Falls Nature Reserve, Royal Jozini, IYSIS (Inyoni Yami), Ngwempisi Wilderness, Sibebe and others. There are other entities that practice secondary or tertiary conservation, as well as two conservancies: the Mhlosinga Conservancy and the Lubombo Conservancy. Others include: the Natural History Society of Eswatini and the Eswatini Game Ranchers Association.

From 2014 to 2021, Eswatini participated in the "Strengthening the National Protected Areas System" (SNPAS) project. This project attempted to strengthen conservation outcomes and the national footprint of biodiversity conservation across the country. In an effort to broaden the spectrum of areas eligible for conservation support (which practice bona-fide conservation management), the United Nations Development Programme (UNDP) established a new category for informal, or non-gazetted, conservation areas in 2018. These are now called OECMs, or Other Effective Conservation Measures. The SNPAS Project adopted this OECM terminology and began certifying informal conservation areas in Eswatini in 2021.

There are known to be 507 bird species in Eswatini, including 11 globally threatened species and four introduced species, and 107 mammal species native to Eswatini, including the critically endangered South-central black rhinoceros and seven other endangered or vulnerable species. Eswatini is rich in bird life, including white-backed vultures, white-headed, lappet-faced and Cape vultures, raptors such as martial eagles, bateleurs, and long-crested eagles, and the southernmost nesting site of the marabou stork.

== Politics ==
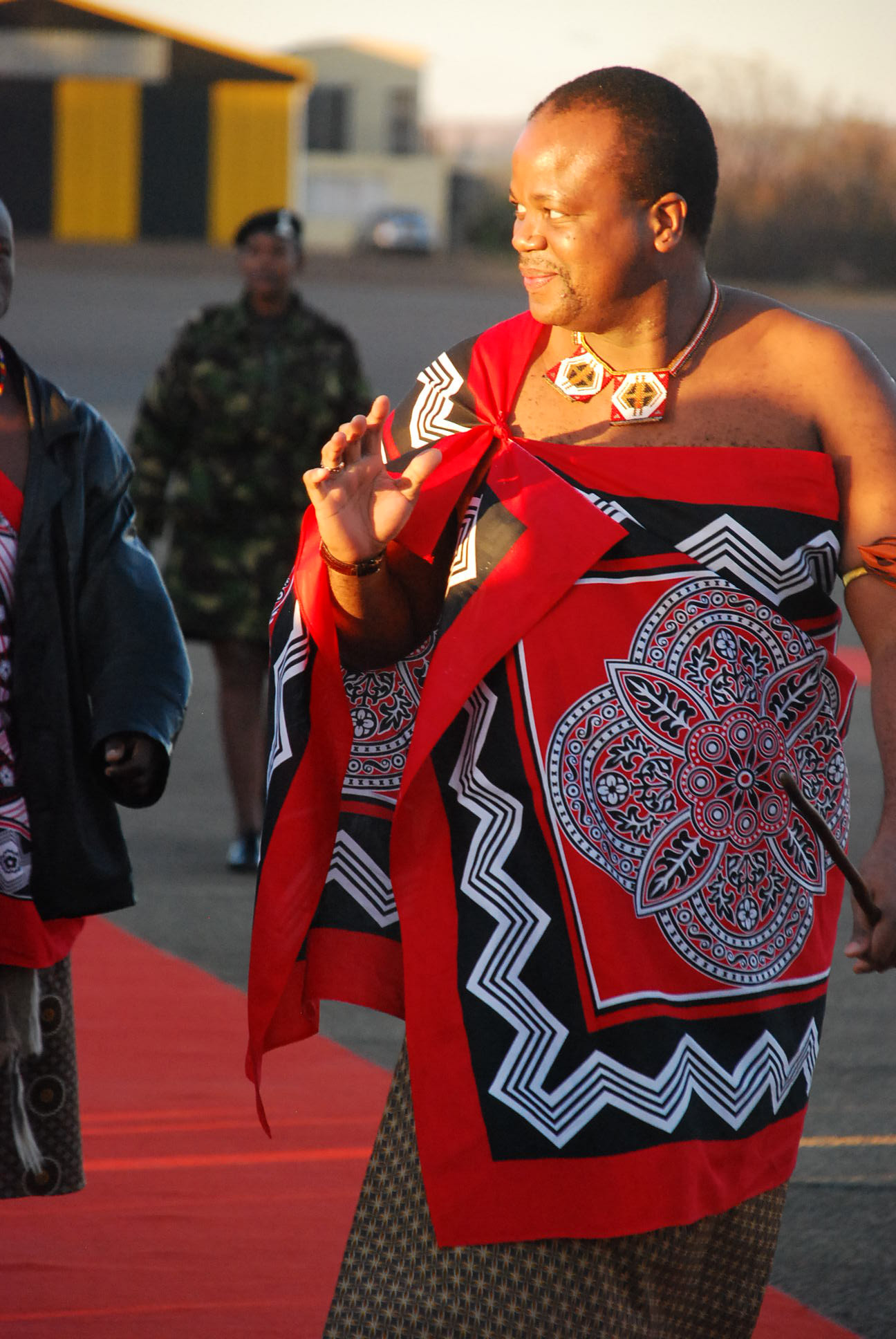
Mswati III has been king of Eswatini since 1986.

=== Monarchy ===
Eswatini is an absolute monarchy with constitutional provision and Swazi law and customs. The head of state is the king or ngwenyama (lit. 'lion'), currently King Mswati III, who ascended to the throne in 1986 after the death of his father King Sobhuza II in 1982 and a period of regency. According to the country's constitution, the ngwenyama is a symbol of unity and the eternity of the Swazi nation. By tradition, the king reigns along with his mother (or a ritual substitute), the ndlovukati (lit. 'she-elephant'). The former was viewed as the administrative head of state and the latter as a spiritual and national head of state, with real power counterbalancing that of the king, but during the long reign of Sobhuza II, the role of the ndlovukati became more symbolic.

The king appoints the prime minister from the legislature and also appoints a majority of senators and a minority of legislators to the lower chamber of the Libandla (parliament) with help from an advisory council. The king is allowed by the constitution to appoint some members to parliament to represent special interests. These special interests are citizens who might have been electoral candidates who were not elected, or might not have stood as candidates. This is done to balance views in parliament. Special interests could be people of a particular gender or race, people with disabilities, significant members of the business community, civic society, scholars, and chiefs.

=== Parliament ===
The Swazi bicameral Parliament, or Libandla, consists of the Senate (30 seats; 10 members appointed by the House of Assembly and 20 appointed by the monarch; to serve five-year terms) and the House of Assembly (65 seats; 10 members appointed by the monarch and 55 elected by popular vote; to serve five-year terms).

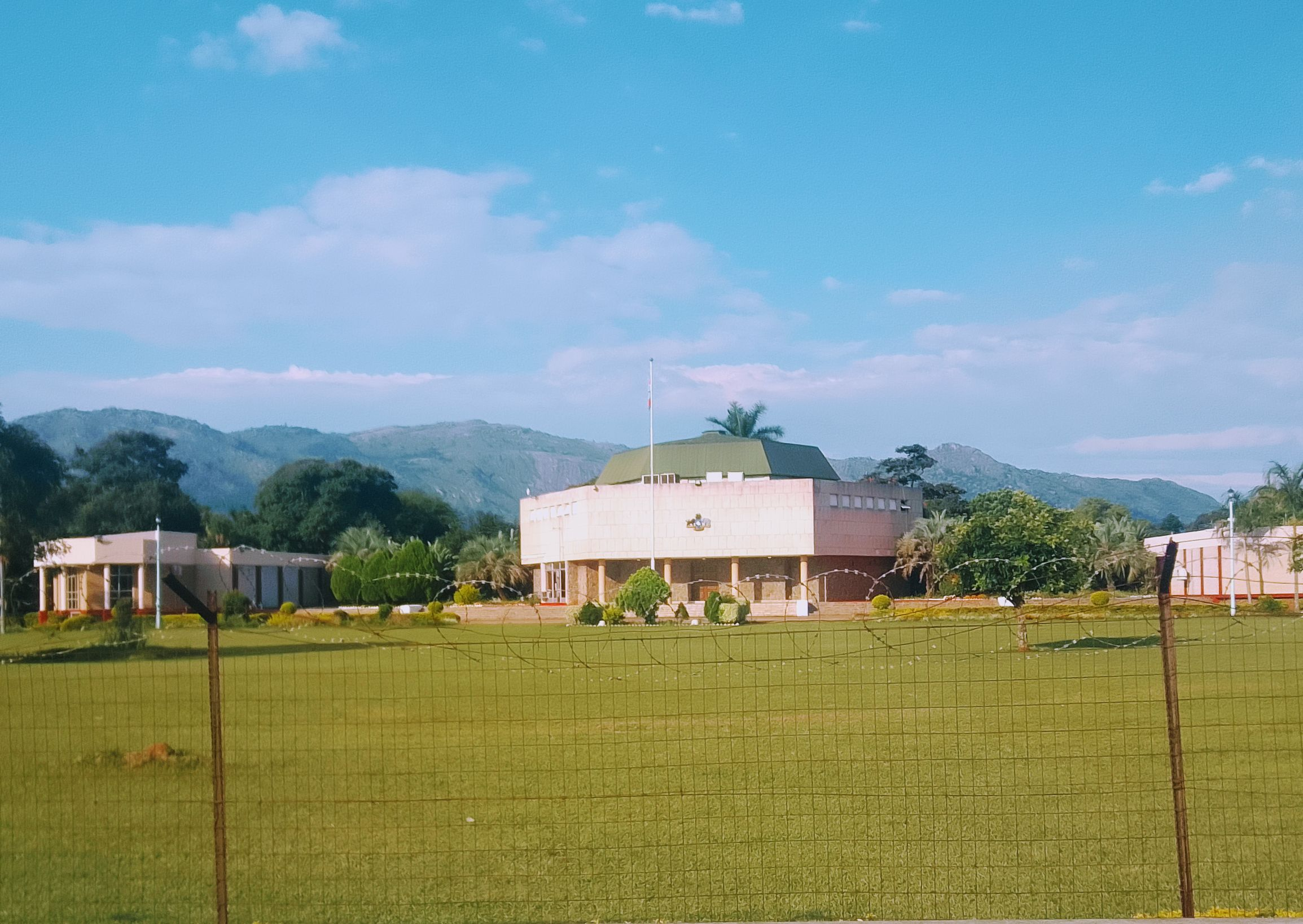
The Parliament of Eswatini in Lobamba

The elections are held every five years after dissolution of parliament by the king. The last elections were held on 29 September 2023. The balloting is done in a non-partisan manner. All election procedures are overseen by the Elections and Boundaries Commission.

=== Political culture ===
At Swaziland's independence on 6 September 1968, Swaziland adopted a Westminster-style constitution. On 12 April 1973, King Sobhuza II annulled it by decree, assuming supreme powers in all executive, judicial, and legislative matters. The first non-party elections for the House of Assembly were held in 1978, and they were conducted under the tinkhundla as electoral constituencies determined by the King, and established an Electoral Committee appointed by the King to supervise elections.

Until the 1993 election, the ballot was not secret, voters were not registered, and they did not elect representatives directly. Instead, voters elected an electoral college by passing through a gate designated for the candidate of choice while officials counted them. Later on, a constitutional review commission was appointed by King Mswati III in July 1996, comprising chiefs, political activists, and unionists to consider public submissions and draft proposals for a new constitution.

Drafts were released for comment in May 1999 and November 2000. These were strongly criticised by civil society organisations in Swaziland and human rights organisations elsewhere. A 15-member team was announced in December 2001 to draft a new constitution; several members of this team were reported to be close to the royal family.

=== Elections ===
Nominations take place at the chiefdoms. On the day of nomination, the name of the nominee is raised by a show of hand, and the nominee either accepts or rejects the nomination. If accepted, the nominee must have the support of at least ten members of that chiefdom. The nominations are for the position of Member of Parliament, Constituency Headman (Indvuna), and the Constituency Executive Committee (Bucopho). The minimum number of nominees is four and the maximum is ten.

Primary elections also take place at the chiefdom level. It is by secret ballot. During the primary elections, the voters are given an opportunity to elect the member of the executive committee (bucopho) for that particular chiefdom. Aspiring members of parliament and the constituency headman are also elected from each chiefdom. The secondary and final elections takes place at the various constituencies called tinkhundla. Candidates who win primary elections in the chiefdoms are considered nominees for the secondary elections at inkhundla or constituency level. The nominees with majority votes become the winners and they become members of parliament or constituency headman. According to 2023 V-Dem Democracy indices Eswatini is 9th lowest ranked worldwide and 2nd lowest ranked electoral democracy in Africa.

=== Foreign relations ===
Eswatini is a member of the United Nations, the Commonwealth of Nations, the African Union, the Common Market for Eastern and Southern Africa, and the Southern African Development Community. It is the only country in Africa that has maintained ties with Taiwan and not China. On May 2, 2026, Taiwanese President Lai Ching-te joined Deputy Prime Minister Thulisile Dladla on her return trip to Eswatini in a surprise visit that Chinese officials called a "farcical 'illegal exit'".

In July 2025, the United States deported 5 men to Eswatini with the agreement of the Eswatini government. An Eswatini government spokesperson reported that the deportees were detained in solitary confinement, but declined to identify the location of the correctional institutions where they were being held or the details of the agreement between the United States and Eswatini governments. By October 2025, ten additional deportees had been sent from the United States to Eswatini and the Eswatini Finance Minister confirmed that the government had received $5.1 million from the United States as part of an agreement to serve as a third-country deportation location.

=== Judiciary ===
The judicial system in Eswatini is a dual system. The 2005 constitution established a court system based on the Western model consisting of four regional Magistrates Courts, a High Court, and a Court of Appeal (the Supreme Court), which are independent of crown control. In addition, traditional courts (Swazi Courts or Customary Courts) deal with minor offences and violations of traditional Swazi law and custom. Judges are appointed by the king and are usually expatriates from South Africa. The Supreme Court, which replaced the previous Court of Appeal, consists of the chief justice and at least four other Supreme Court judges. The High Court consists of the chief justice and at least four High Court judges. The chief justices have been:

- 1967–1970: Sir Isadore Victor Elgan
- 1970–1972: Sir Philip Pike
- 1972–1973–?: Roland Hill
- ?–1974–1983–?: Charles Nathan
- 1985–1991: Nicholas Robin Hannah
- 1998–2002: Stanley Sapire
- 2002–2007: Jacobus Annandale (acting)
- 2007–2010: Richard Banda
- 2010–2015: Michael Ramodibedi
- 2015–2026: Bheki Maphalala

=== Military ===
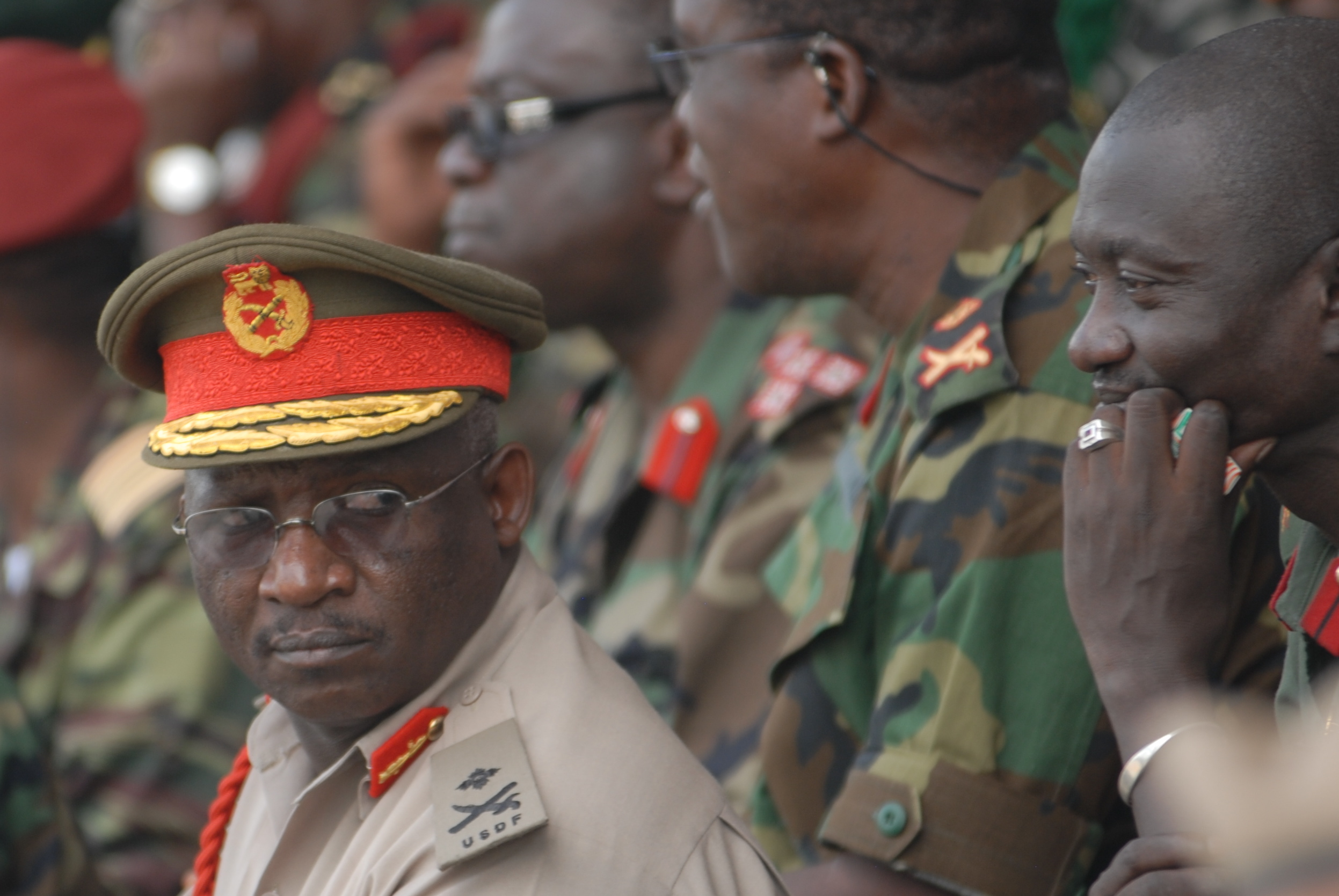
Swazi army officers

The military of Eswatini (Umbutfo Eswatini Defence Force) is used primarily during domestic protests, with some border and customs duties. The military has never been involved in a foreign conflict. The king is the commander-in-chief of the defence force and the substantive Minister of the Ministry of Defence. There are approximately 3,000 personnel in the defence force, with the army being the largest component. There is a small air force, which is mainly used for transporting the king as well as cargo and personnel, surveying land with search and rescue functions, and mobilising in case of a national emergency.

== Administrative divisions ==
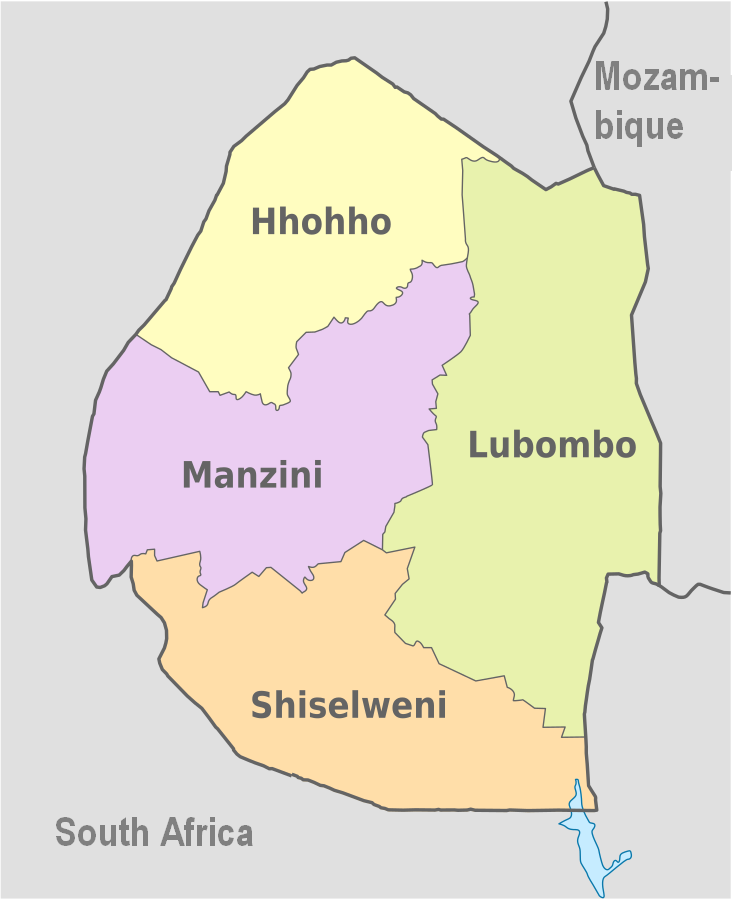
A clickable map of Eswatini exhibiting its four districts.

Eswatini is divided into four regions: Hhohho, Lubombo, Manzini, and Shiselweni. In each of the four regions, there are several tinkhundla (singular inkhundla). The regions are managed by a regional administrator, who is aided by elected members in each inkhundla. The local government is divided into differently structured rural and urban councils depending on the level of development in the area. Although there are different political structures to the local authorities, effectively the urban councils are municipalities and the rural councils are the tinkhundla. There are 12 municipalities and 55 tinkhundla. Each inkhundla has a development committee (bucopho) elected from the various constituency chiefdoms in its area for a five-year term. Bucopho bring to the inkhundla all matters of interest and concern to their various chiefdoms, and take back to the chiefdoms the decisions of the inkhundla. The chairman of the bucopho is elected at the inkhundla and is called indvuna ye nkhundla.

There are three tiers of government in the urban areas and these are city councils, town councils and town boards. This variation considers the size of the town or city. Equally, there are three tiers in the rural areas which are the regional administration at the regional level, tinkhundla and chiefdoms. Decisions are made by full council based on recommendations made by the various sub-committees. The town clerk is the chief advisor in each local council or town board. There are 12 declared urban areas, comprising two city councils, three town councils and seven town boards. The main cities and towns in Eswatini are Manzini, Mbabane, Nhlangano and Siteki which are also regional capitals.

ISO 3166-2:SZ map key

Region #	Region	Capital	Area (km^{2})	Population (2017 census)
1	Hhohho	Mbabane	3,625.17	320,651
2	Manzini	Manzini	4,093.59	355,945
3	Lubombo	Siteki	5,849.11	212,531
4	Shiselweni	Nhlangano	3,786.71	204,111

== Economy ==
Eswatini's economy is diverse, with agriculture, forestry and mining accounting for about 13% of GDP, manufacturing (textiles and sugar-related processing) representing 37% of GDP and services – with government services in the lead – constituting 50% of GDP. Title Deed Lands, where the bulk of high value crops are grown (sugar, forestry, and citrus), are characterised by high levels of investment and irrigation, and high productivity. About 75% of the population is employed in subsistence agriculture upon Swazi Nation Land (SNL). In contrast with the commercial farms, SNL suffers from low productivity and investment.

GDP per capita, 1970 to 2019

The cultivation of sugarcane, the country's largest export, has involved forced evictions of rural communities to build plantations, child labour and work weeks of up to 60 hours. The International Trade Union Confederation refers to "arduous and unhealthy working conditions, miserable wages and violent repression of any attempt to unionise." Economic growth has lagged behind that of neighbouring countries. Real GDP growth since 2001 has averaged 2.8%, nearly 2 percentage points lower than growth in other Southern African Customs Union member countries. Low agricultural productivity in the SNLs, repeated droughts, the devastating effect of HIV/AIDS and an overly large and inefficient government sector are likely contributing factors. Eswatini's public finances deteriorated in the late 1990s following sizeable surpluses a decade earlier. A combination of declining revenues and increased spending led to significant budget deficits.

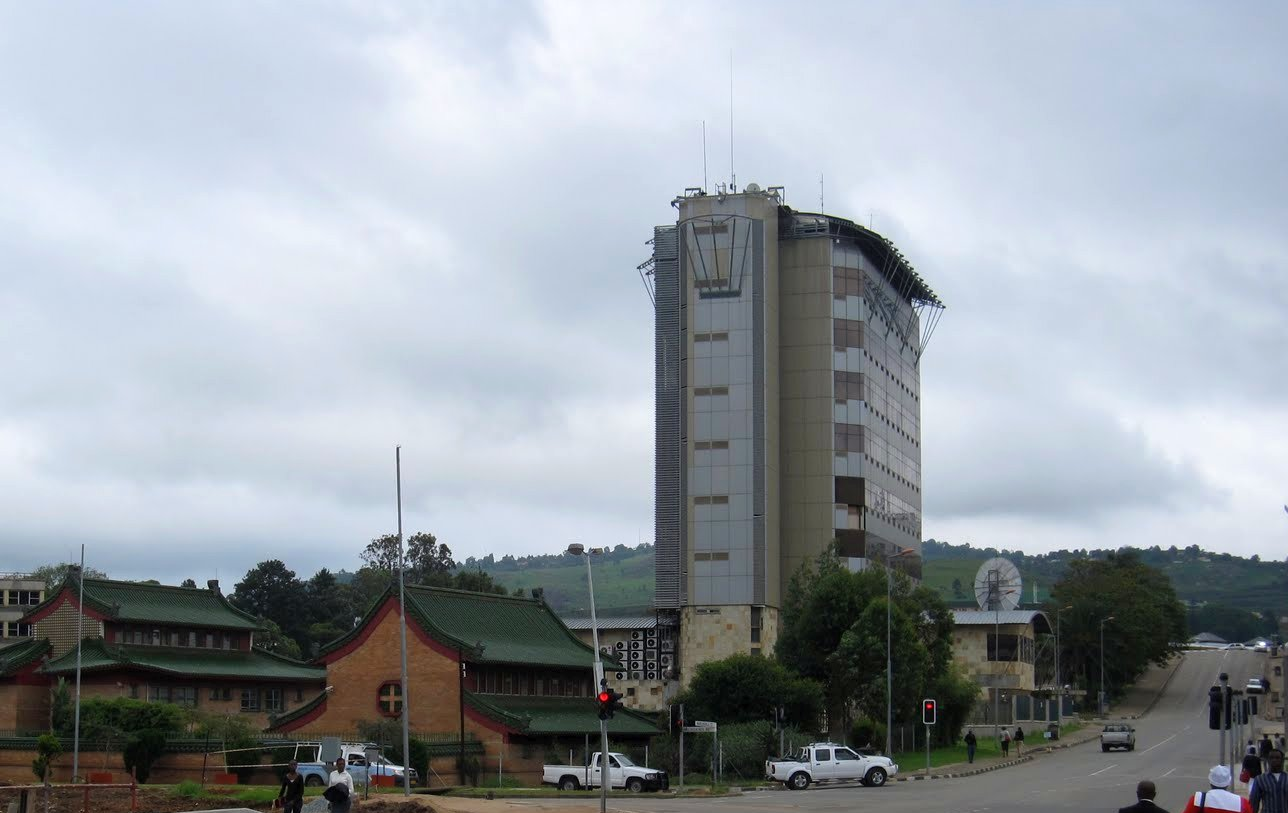
Central Bank in Mbabane

Eswatini's economy is very closely linked to the economy of South Africa, from which it receives over 90% of its imports and to which it sends about 70% of its exports. Eswatini's other key trading partners are the United States (under the African Growth and Opportunity Act) and the EU, from whom the country has received trade preferences for apparel exports to the US and for sugar to the EU. Under these agreements, both apparel and sugar exports did well, with rapid growth and a strong inflow of foreign direct investment.

Eswatini is part of the Southern African Customs Union (green).

The continued vibrancy of the export sector is threatened by the removal of trade preferences for textiles, the accession to similar preferences for East Asian countries, and the phasing out of preferential prices for sugar to the EU market. Eswatini will thus have to face the challenge of remaining competitive in a changing global environment. The Investment Climate Assessment provides some positive findings, namely that Eswatini firms are among the most productive in Sub-Saharan Africa, although they are less productive than firms in the most productive middle-income countries in other regions. They compare more favourably with firms from lower middle income countries but are hampered by inadequate governance arrangements and infrastructure.

Eswatini's currency, the lilangeni, is pegged to the South African rand, subsuming Eswatini's monetary policy to South Africa. Customs duties from the Southern African Customs Union and worker remittances from South Africa substantially supplement domestically earned income. Eswatini is not poor enough to merit an IMF programme; however, the country is struggling to reduce the size of the civil service and control costs at public enterprises. The government is trying to improve the atmosphere for foreign direct investment.

As of 2018, public services were very poorly developed. The country had only twelve public ambulances, elementary schools generally no longer provided canteens and pharmacies were disappearing.

A large amount of wealth in Eswatini is held by the state and the king, including land and large corporations such as RES (Royal Eswatini Sugar) Corporation which is majority owned by the king's sovereign wealth fund, Tibiyo Taka Ngwane, with an additional 6.5% owned by the Eswatini government.

For much of the population, private economic activity involves subsistence agriculture. There are also private businesses run by 15,000 businessmen including descendants of British settlers and some South African investors who have come to Eswatini because they can hire employees at a third of the pay rates they would pay in South Africa. King Mswati III receives 8% of the national budget for official expenses. The police force receives 5% of the budget, as do the armed forces.

== Demographics ==
=== Largest cities ===
Largest cities or towns in Eswatini Source:
Rank	Name	Region	Pop.
1	Manzini	Manzini	110,537
2	Mbabane	Hhohho	76,218
3	Big Bend	Lubombo	10,342
4	Malkerns	Manzini	9,724
5	Nhlangano	Shiselweni	9,016
6	Mhlume	Lubombo	8,652
7	Hluti	Shiselweni	6,763
8	Siteki	Lubombo	6,152
9	Piggs Peak	Hhohho	5,750
10	Lobamba	Hhohho	4,557

Eswatini's population in thousands (1950–2021)

The majority of Eswatini's population is ethnically Swazi, mixed with a small number of Zulu and White Africans, mostly people of British and Afrikaner descent. Traditionally Swazi have been subsistence farmers and herders, but most now mix such activities with work in the growing urban formal economy and in government. Some Swazi work in the mines in South Africa. Eswatini also received Portuguese settlers and African refugees from Mozambique. Christianity in Eswatini is sometimes mixed with traditional beliefs and practices. Many traditionalists believe that most Swazi ascribe a special spiritual role to the monarch.

=== Languages ===
SiSwati (also known as Swati, Swazi or Siswati) is a Bantu language of the Nguni group, spoken in Eswatini and South Africa. It has 2.5 million speakers and is taught in schools. It is an official language of Eswatini, along with English, and one of the official languages of South Africa. English is the medium of communication in schools, conducting business, and the press. About 76,000 people in the country speak Zulu. Tsonga, which is spoken by many people throughout the region is spoken by about 19,000 people in Eswatini. Afrikaans is also spoken by some residents of Afrikaner descent. Portuguese has been introduced as a third language in the schools because of the large community of Portuguese speakers from Mozambique or Northern and Central Portugal.

=== Religion ===
Eighty-three percent of the total population adheres to Christianity in Eswatini. Anglican, Protestant and indigenous African churches, including African Zionist (37.6%), constitute the majority of Christians, followed by Catholicism at 3.7% of the population. On 18 July 2012, Ellinah Wamukoya was elected Anglican Bishop of Swaziland, becoming the first woman to be a bishop in Africa and serving in that position until her death in 2021. Fifteen percent of the population follows traditional religions; other non-Christian religions practised in the country include Islam (0.3%), the Baháʼí Faith (0.04%), and Hinduism (0.02%). There were 14 Jewish families in 2013.

The Kingdom of Eswatini does not recognise non-civil marriages such as Islamic-rite marriage contracts.

=== Health ===
As of 2019, Eswatini has the highest prevalence of HIV among people aged 15 to 49 in the world (27.1%).

Eswatini scores 15.7 in global hunger index 2024, with 74th rank.

=== Education ===
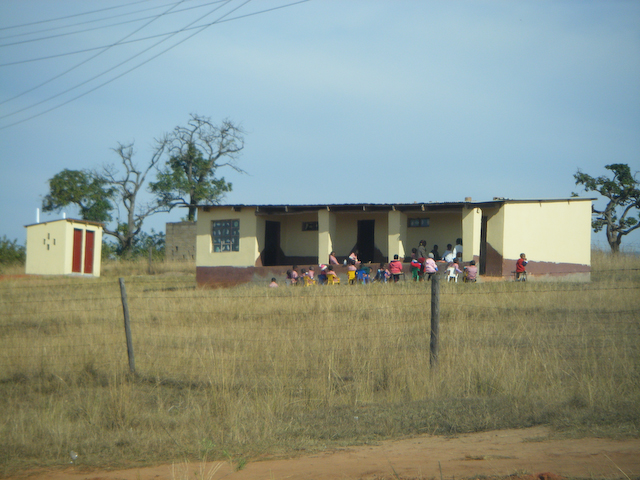
A rural primary school in Eswatini

Education in Eswatini begins with pre-school education for infants, primary, secondary and high school education for general education and training, and universities and colleges at the tertiary level. Pre-school education is usually for children 5-years or younger; after that, a student can enroll in a primary school anywhere in the country. Early childhood care and education centres take the form of preschools or neighbourhood care points. In the country 21.6% of preschool age children have access to early childhood education. Primary education begins at age six. It is a seven-year programme that culminates with an end-of-primary-school examination in grade 7 which is a locally based assessment administered by the Examinations Council through schools.

The secondary and high school education system is a five-year programme divided into three years junior secondary and two years senior secondary. There is an external public examination (Junior Certificate) at the end of the junior secondary that learners must pass to progress to the senior secondary level. The Examinations Council of Swaziland administers this examination. At the end of the senior secondary level, learners sit for a public examination, the Swaziland General Certificate of Secondary Education and International General Certificate of Secondary Education which is accredited by the Cambridge International Examination. A few schools offer the Advanced Studies programme in their curriculum.

There are 830 public schools including primary, secondary and high schools. There are also 34 recognised private schools with an additional 14 unrecognised private schools. The largest number of schools is in the Hhohho region. Education is free at primary level, mainly first through the fourth grade and also free for orphaned and vulnerable children, but not compulsory. In 1996, the net primary school enrollment rate was 90.8%, with gender parity at the primary level. In 1998, 80.5% of children reached grade five.

In 1963, Waterford School, later named Waterford Kamhlaba United World College of Southern Africa, was founded as southern Africa's first multiracial school. In 1981, Waterford Kamhlaba joined the United World Colleges movement as the first United World College on the African continent, and the only African UWC until 2019, when UWC East Africa in Tanzania joined the movement.

==== Higher education ====
The University of Eswatini, Southern African Nazarene University and Eswatini Medical Christian University are the institutions that offer university education in the country. A campus of Limkokwing University of Creative Technology can be found at Sidvwashini (Sidwashini), a suburb of Mbabane. Ngwane Teacher's College and William Pitcher College are the country's teaching colleges. The Good Shepherd Hospital in Siteki is home to the College for Nursing Assistants. The University of Eswatini is the national university, established in 1982 by act of Parliament, and is headquartered at Kwaluseni with additional campuses in Mbabane and Luyengo. The Southern African Nazarene University in Manzini was established in 2010 as a merger of the Nazarene College of Nursing, College of Theology and the Nazarene Teachers College.

Eswatini Medical Christian University, focusing on medical education, was established in 2012 and is Eswatini's newest university. It is in Mbabane. The campus of Limkokwing University was opened at Sidvwashini in Mbabane in 2012. The main centre for technical training in Eswatini is the Eswatini College of Technology Other technical and vocational institutions include the Gwamile Vocational and Commercial Training Institute in Matsapha, the Manzini Industrial and Training Centre in Manzini, Nhlangano Agricultural Skills Training Centre, and Siteki Industrial Training Centre.

In addition to these institutions, the kingdom also has the Eswatini Institute of Management and Public Administration (SIMPA) and Institute of Development Management (IDM). SIMPA is a government-owned management and development institute, and IDM is a regional organisation in Botswana, Lesotho, and Eswatini, providing training, consultancy, and research in management. North Carolina State University's Poole College of Management is a sister school of SIMPA. The Mananga Management Centre was established at Ezulwini as Mananga Agricultural Management Centre in 1972 as an international management development centre offering training of middle and senior managers.

== Tourism ==
Tourism in Eswatini developed significantly during the apartheid era, attracting visitors with different policies from South Africa. Tourists came for television programmes, sporting events, and gambling unavailable in South Africa. Tourist numbers rose from 89,015 in 1972 to 257,997 in 1989. Post-apartheid, growth slowed as neighbouring countries became more appealing. Now, Eswatini emphasises its traditional culture and status as the last sub-Saharan African monarchy to attract tourists. The Eswatini Tourism Board, established in 2003, promotes royal celebrations and game parks. In 2006, Eswatini joined the Lubombo Route agreement with South Africa and Mozambique, allowing cross-border travel on a single visa.

== Culture ==
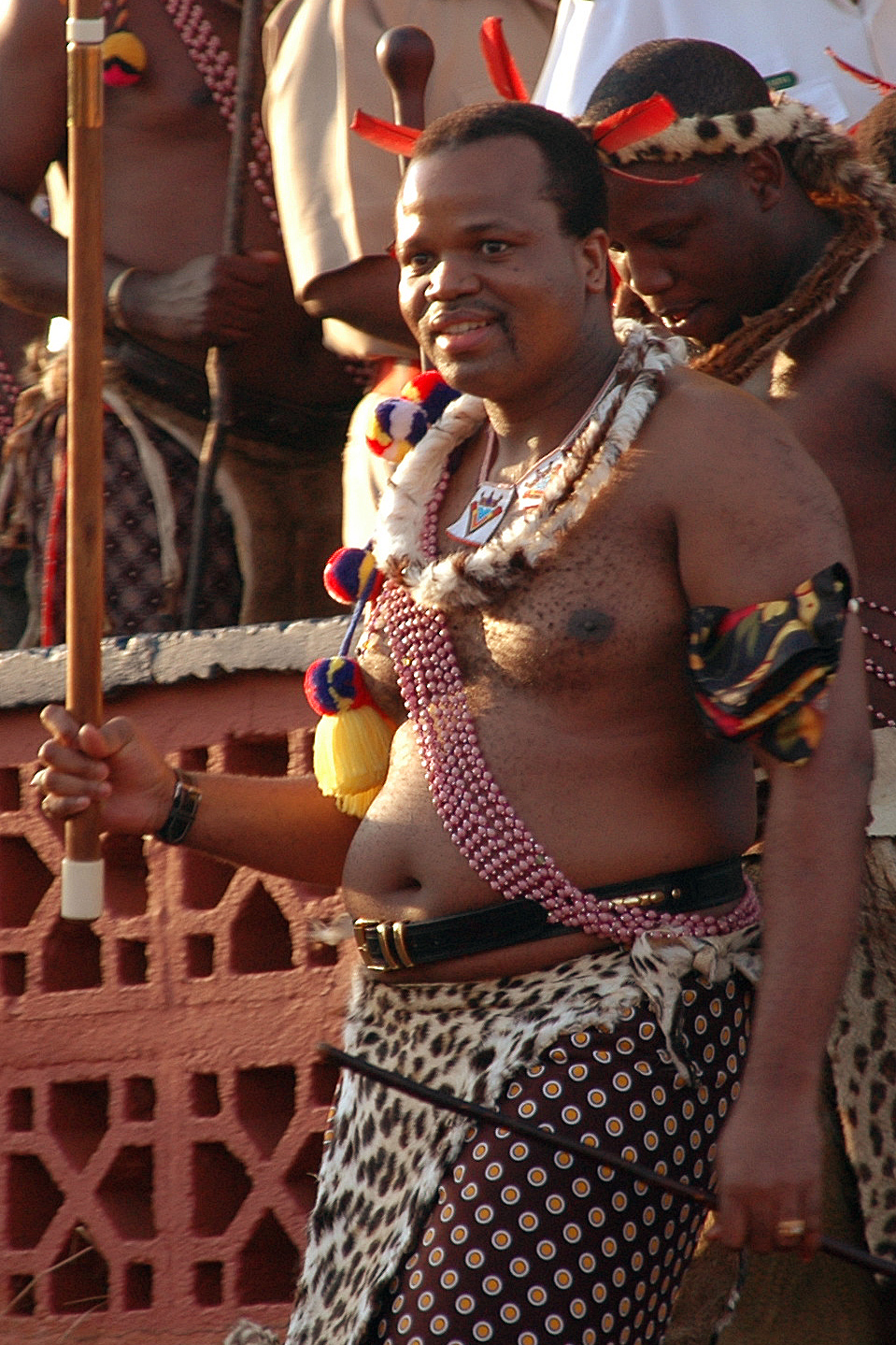
King Mswati III at the reed dance festival, where he will choose his next wife

The principal Swazi social unit is the homestead, a traditional beehive hut thatched with dry grass. In a polygamous homestead, each wife has her own hut and yard surrounded by reed fences. There are three structures for sleeping, cooking, and storage (brewing beer). Larger homesteads also have structures used as bachelors' quarters and guest accommodation. Central to the traditional homestead is the cattle byre, a circular area enclosed by large logs, interspersed with branches. The cattle byre has ritual as well as practical significance as a store of wealth and symbol of prestige. It contains sealed grain pits. Facing the cattle byre is the great hut which is occupied by the mother of the headman. The headman is central to all homestead affairs, and he is often polygamous. He leads through example and advises his wives on all social affairs of the home, as well as seeing to the well-being of the family. He also spends time socialising with the young boys, who are often his sons or close relatives, advising them on the expectations of growing up and manhood.

The sangoma is a traditional diviner chosen by the ancestors of that particular family. The training of the sangoma is called "kwetfwasa". At the end of the training, a graduation ceremony takes place where all the local sangoma come together for feasting and dancing. The diviner is consulted for various purposes, such as determining the cause of sickness or even death. His diagnosis is based on "kubhula", a process of communication, through trance, with the natural superpowers. The inyanga (a medical and pharmaceutical specialist in western terms) possesses the bone throwing skill ("kushaya ematsambo") used to determine the cause of the sickness.

The most important cultural event in Eswatini is the Incwala ceremony. It is held on the fourth day after the full moon nearest the longest day, 21 December. Incwala is often translated in English as "first fruits ceremony", but the king's tasting of the new harvest is only one aspect among many in this long pageant. Incwala is best translated as "Kingship Ceremony": when there is no king, there is no incwala. It is a crime for any other person to hold an Incwala. Every Swazi may take part in the public parts of the Incwala. The climax of the event is the fourth day of the Big Incwala. The key figures are the king, queen mother, royal wives and children, the royal governors (indunas), the chiefs, the regiments, and the "bemanti" or "water people".

Eswatini's most well-known cultural event is the annual Umhlanga Reed Dance. In the eight-day ceremony, girls cut reeds, present them to the Queen Mother and then dance bare-breasted. It is done in late August or early September. Only childless, unmarried girls can take part. The aims of the ceremony are to preserve girls' chastity, provide tribute labour for the Queen Mother and to encourage solidarity by working together. The royal family appoints a commoner maiden to be "induna" (captain) of the girls and she announces the dates of the annual ceremony over the radio. The chosen induna is expected to be an expert dancer and knowledgeable on royal protocol. One of the king's daughters acts as her counterpart during the ceremony. The Reed Dance today is not an ancient ceremony but a development of the old "umchwasho" custom. In "umchwasho", all young girls were placed in a female age-regiment. If any girl became pregnant outside of marriage, her family paid a fine of one cow to the local chief. After a number of years, when the girls had reached a marriageable age, they would perform labour service for the queen mother, ending with dancing and feasting. The country was under the rite of "umchwasho" until 2005.

Eswatini is also known for a strong presence in the handcrafts industry. The formalised handcraft businesses of Eswatini employ over 2,500 people, many of whom are women. The products are unique and reflect the culture of Eswatini, ranging from housewares, to artistic decorations, to complex glass, stone or wood artwork.

=== Sport ===
Eswatini has sent athletes to the Summer Olympics since 1972 but is yet to win a medal. The country has won medals in boxing and marathon at the Commonwealth Games. Team sports popular in Eswatini include football, cricket and rugby union. The Somhlolo National Stadium is the largest sporting venue.

== See also ==
- Outline of Eswatini
- International rankings of Eswatini
