= Lady Howard Mabuza =

Swazi politician

The Honourable Lady Howard Mabuza
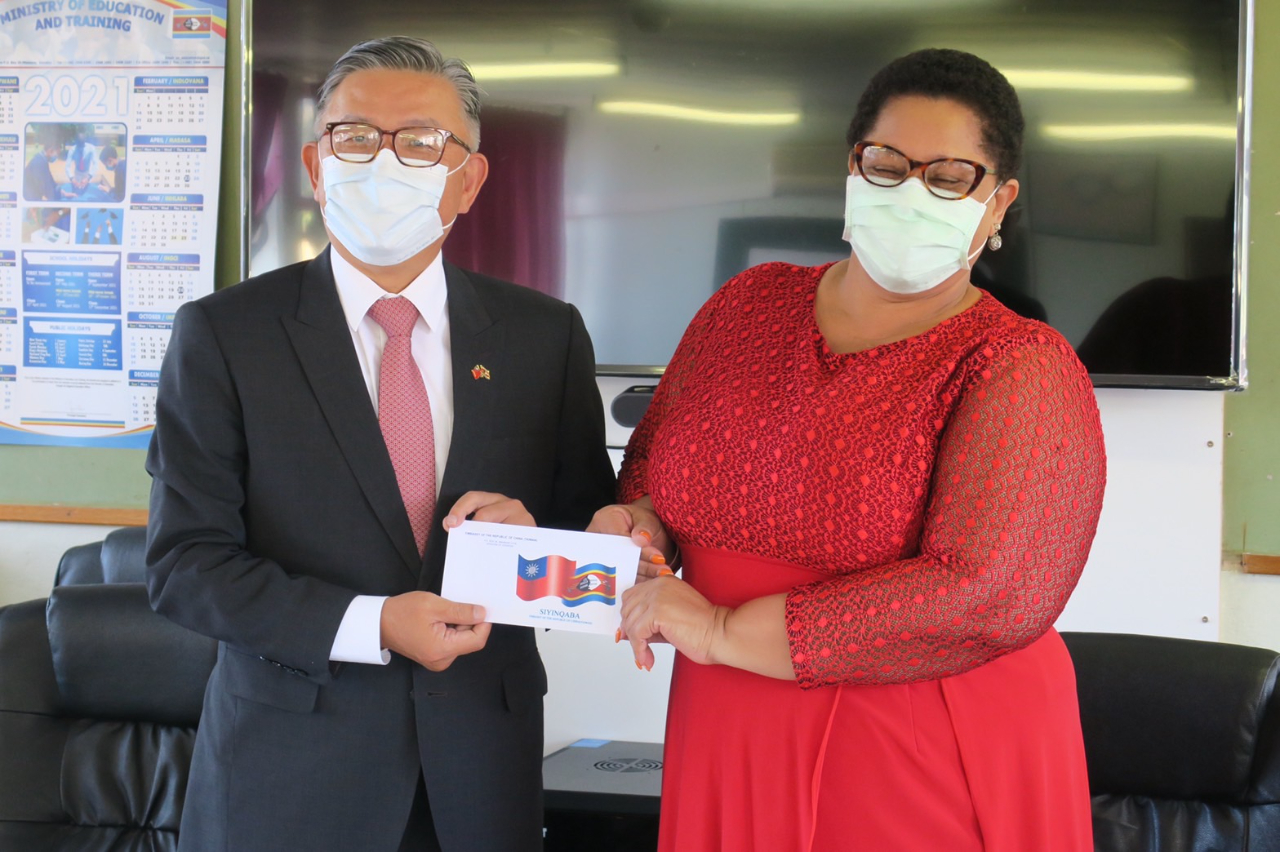
- Mabuza (right) in 2022.

Minister of Education and Training
- In office 2019–2023
- Monarch: Mswati III
- Prime Minister: Themba Masuku (2020–2021); Cleopas Dlamini (2021–2023); Mgwagwa Gamedze (2023)
- Succeeded by: Owen Nxumalo

Personal details
- Occupation: politician

Lady Howard Mabuza is a Swazi politician. She served in the Cabinet of Eswatini as the Minister of Education and Training from 2019 to 2023. As education minister, she advocated for women's education and women's representation in government.

== Career ==
Mabuza was elected Eswatini's Minister of Education and Training in 2019. Later that year she spoke about the importance of women's education and effective learning and its connection to HIV prevention, teen-pregnancy prevention, improved health, poverty reduction, job creation, and economic growth.

During the COVID-19 pandemic in Eswatini, Mabuza pushed the government to hire 900 additional teachers to help schools reopen following the national lockdown. She encouraged students and teachers to receive the COVID-19 vaccine so that schools could reopen and extracurricular activities for students could resume. She thanked the Qatar Embassy in Eswatini for providing aid to students during the pandemic.

She visited Ndunayithini School, Mahamba High School, Ngwane Central Primary School, Mavula High School, and Longolotjeni School in August 2021 after they were damaged by vandals and arsonists. In October 2021, Mabuza denounced student protests and anti-monarchist strikes that demanded the release of detained pro-democracy members of parliament. The strikes led to sixteen schools closing indefinitely. Along with Eswatini Prime Minister Cleopas Sipho Dlamini, she gave warnings to teachers against showing solidarity with the student movement or taking part in the protests. She announced the reopening of schools in November 2021.

In November 2021, Mabuza initiated a "no work, no pay" policy for teachers who take off from work without explanation.

On 4 August 2022, Mabuza hosted a round table discussion for policy makers, development partners, and industry leaders as part of Eswatini's national preparations for the Transforming Education Summit.

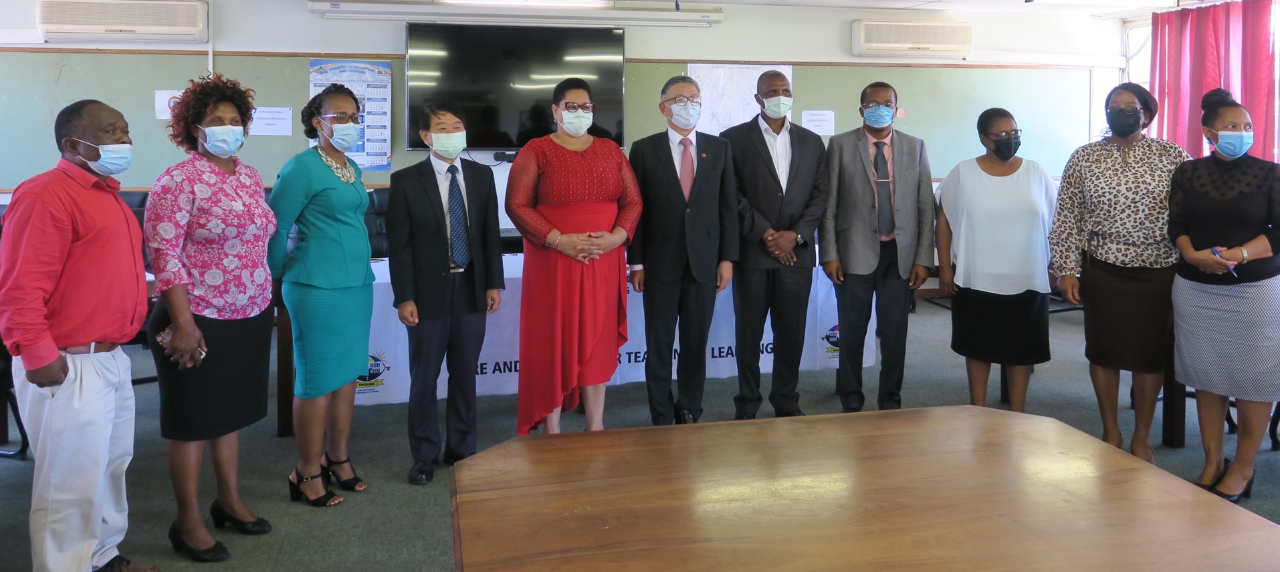
Mabuza (first on the left from center) presiding over the Eswatini Institute of Technology's Scholarship Donation Ceremony for Taiwan in 2022

As education minister, she advocated for the right to education of unwed and young mothers. Mabuza partnered with the United Nations Resident Coordinator, UNESCO, UNICEF, and the Eswatini Network Campaign for Education for All to launch an early and unintended pregnancy prevention policy and management guidelines program in May 2023.

She lost the primary for re-election to Phileomon Mkhatjwa in August 2023.

In September 2023, Mabuza attended the Eswatini Youth Empowerment Programme Ezulwini Artisanal Graduation Ceremony for graduates of the Manzini Industrial Training Centre, facilitated by the United Nations Development Programme at the United Nations House in Mbabane.

She spoke out against gender-based violence in Eswatini in November 2023 and called on parliament to address it as a national issue. Mabuza also spoke in favor of women's empowerment and for more women's representation in government.
