= Martin Dlamini =

Minister of Finance of Eswatini

Minister of Finance
- In office November 2013 – November 2018
- Preceded by: Majozi Sithole
- Succeeded by: Neal Rijkenberg

Personal details
- Education: Adelphi University

Honourable Martin Gobizandla Dlamini is an economist, former Central Bank Governor and former Minister of Finance from Eswatini.

Dlamini worked in Central Bank of Eswatini for 30 years, including as the appointed governor, before he was appointed to the Cabinet of Swaziland in 2013. He has experience in the banking and financial sector. He was the governor of the bank from July 1997 to November 2013.

Dlamini was appointed as Minister of Finance in November 2013. He was replaced in 2018 by Neal Rijkenberg.

Honourable Martin Dlamini has been married to his wife Mrs. Victoria Dlamini, also a banker, for 53 years. They share 4 children, Themba Dlamini, Dr. Pholile Dlamini, PSY.D, HSP, Vumile Dlamini and Bhekilanga Dlamini.
