= Matata, Eswatini =

Matata
- Location within Eswatini
- Coordinates: 26°52′00″S 31°55′28″E
- Country: Eswatini
- Elevation: 110.31 m (361.9 ft)

Population (2014 Estimated)
  - Total: 3,000+
- Climate: Cwb

Matata is a town in Eswatini.

== Location ==
The town is located on the southern banks of the Maputo River, in Lubombo Region, in the southeastern part of the country, close to the border with the Republic of South Africa, approximately 130 kilometres (81 mi), by road, south-east of Mbabane, the largest city and capital of Swaziland. The geographical coordinates of Matata, Swaziland are: 26°52'00.0"S, 31°55'28.0"E (Latitude:-26.866672; Longitude:31.924455). Matata sits at an average elevation of 110.31 metres (362 ft), above sea level.

== Overview ==
Matata the town, is home to the business known as Matata Group of Companies. The businesses include supermarkets, retail stores, farm machinery outlets, abattoirs, cattle ranches, a butchery, sugar farms, and maize plantations. The majority of adults in Matata the town, are employed in Matata the business group.

== Population ==
In 2014, the population of Matata, was estimated at over 3,000 people.

== Points of interest ==
Eswatini Bank, the only indigenous commercial bank in Eswatini, maintains a branch in Matata.

== See also ==
- List of banks in Eswatini
