= Michelo Shakantu =

Businessman

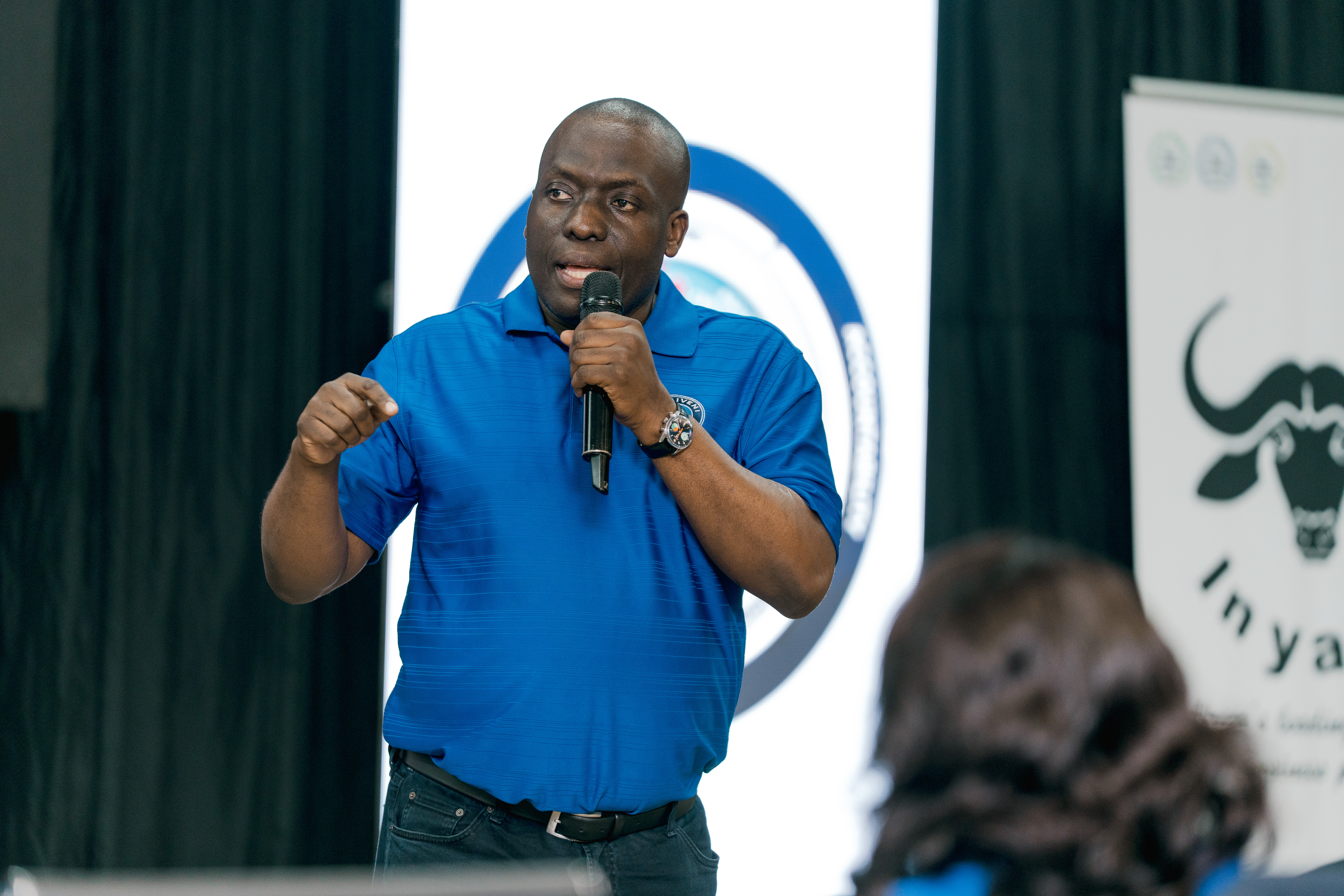
- Born: Zambia
- Other name: "Shabangu"
- Education: Bachelor of Science in Actuarial Science from London School of Business
- Occupation: Businessman
- Known for: Executive Chairman of the Inyatsi Group
- Title: Executive Chairman, Inyatsi Group Holdings

Michelo Shakantu is a Zambian-born businessman based in Eswatini who is the shareholder and executive chairman of the Inyatsi Group, a construction-led conglomerate headquartered in Eswatini. The group has interests in construction, manufacturing, telecommunications, mining, healthcare and insurance.

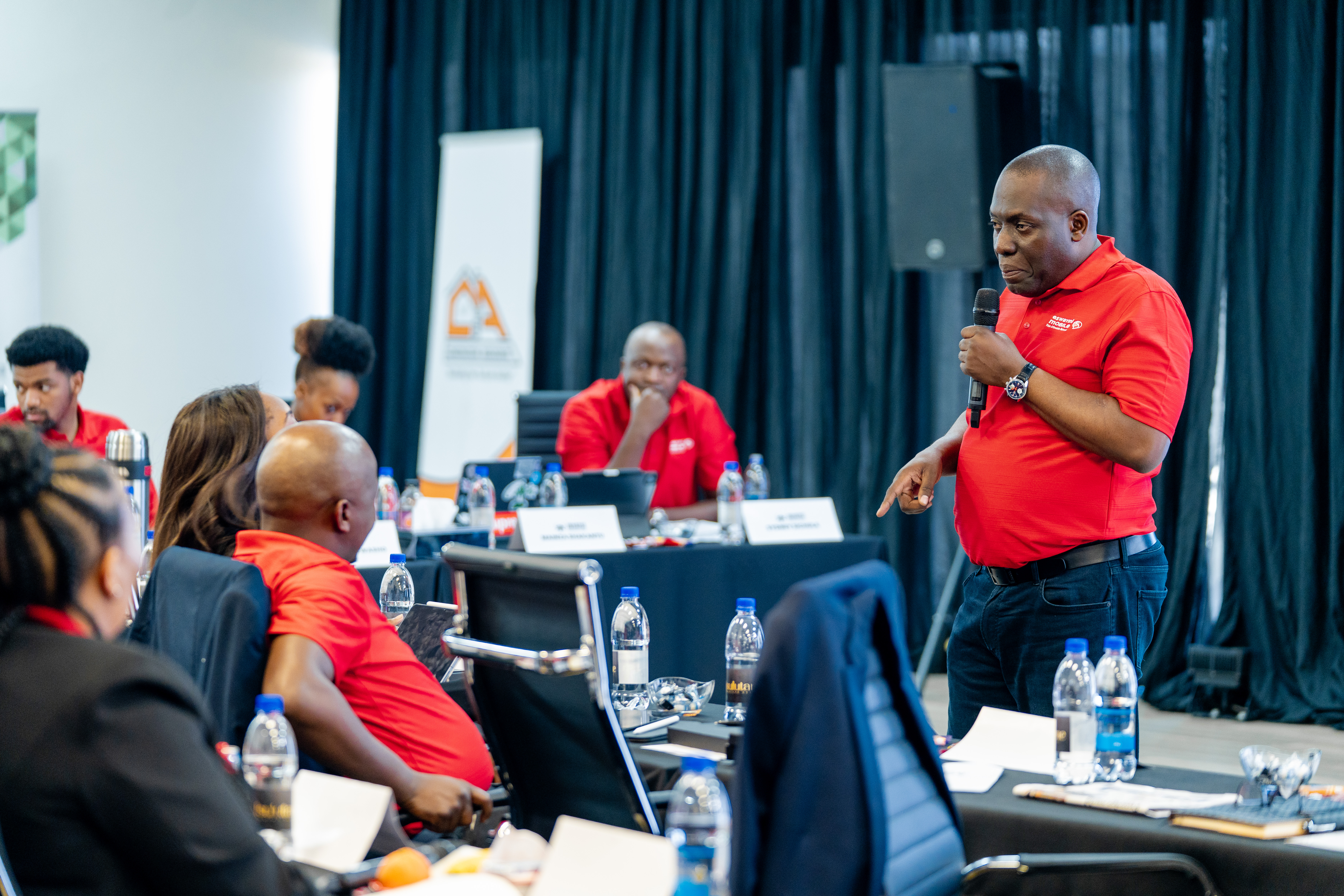
Shakantu during the Mid-year Leadership Forum at Nsulutane Hotel

== Education ==
Shakantu holds a Bachelor of Science degree in actuarial science from the London School of Business.

== Career ==
Before leading the Inyatsi Group, Shakantu held senior operational roles at McDonald's, Southern Sun, Premier Bakeries and Lever Brothers.

Shakantu holds a shareholding in and leads the Inyatsi Group, which employs a workforce of more than 6,000 people and describes its vision as becoming "Africa's Leading Integrated Business Partner."

In January 2026, Prime Minister Russell Dlamini described Inyatsi as the leading tax-compliant contributor in Eswatini's construction sector, noting that the group had paid more than E1 billion in taxes and dividends, created over 6,000 jobs locally, spent around E700 million annually on its wage bill, and worked with a network of over 2,200 subcontractors and suppliers.

The group's subsidiaries and interests include:

- Inyatsi Construction – a civil-engineering contractor
- Construction Associates (CA) – a building contractor specialising in vertical construction
- Infracast – a manufacturer of precast concrete products operating factories
- Eswatini Mobile – the country's second mobile network operator
- Maloma Colliery – an anthracite coal mine, described as the largest of its kind in Africa, supplying the steel and metallurgical industries
- The Clinic Group – a private healthcare provider
- Lidwala Insurance – a short-term insurer
- The Times of Eswatini – a newspaper and media house

Other operations under the group include Eswatini Meat Industries, Green Acres and the Nsulutane Hotel.

== International Convention Centre ==
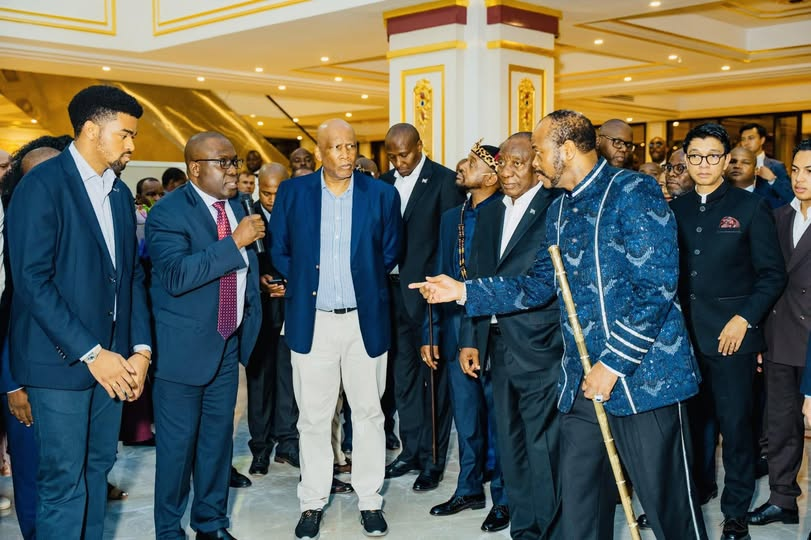
Shakantu joins King Mswati III and regional leaders at the ICC.

In April 2026, King Mswati III officially opened the International Convention Centre (ICC) at Ezulwini, one of Eswatini's Millennium Projects, which was built by the Inyatsi Group through its subsidiaries Inyatsi Construction and Construction Associates. Shakantu led a tour of the facility for the King and visiting heads of state, describing the 42,000-square-metre building as designed to a First-World standard, with a main chamber capable of seating 1,500 delegates. At a subsequent state dinner marking the country's "40/58" double celebrations, the King publicly commended Shakantu — whom he addresses by the nickname "Shabangu" — and Construction Associates for the completion of the project.

== Investigations ==
In 2024, the International Consortium of Investigative Journalists published the Swazi Secrets investigation, based on leaked documents from the Eswatini Financial Intelligence Unit. The documents showed that the unit had scrutinised Shakantu's finances and accounts, and that a property at the Nkonyeni Golf Estate allegedly connected to former Zambian president Edgar Lungu was registered to a trust represented by Shakantu. Inyatsi denied any relationship with Lungu. Lungu publicly denied owning property or business interests in Eswatini and described the reporting as malicious. The Financial Mail, drawing on research by Open Secrets, reported that Inyatsi Construction had appeared in a forensic report as one of the companies that profited from a Passenger Rail Agency of South Africa contract awarded through an allegedly manipulated tender process.
