= Inyatsi Group Holdings =

Eswatini-based diversified holding company

- Type: Private
- Industry: Conglomerate
- Founded: 1982; 44 years ago (as Inyatsi Construction)
- Headquarters: Inyatsi House, Trelawny Park, Manzini, Eswatini
- Key people: Michelo Shakantu (executive chairman)
- Services: Construction, mining, telecommunications, insurance, healthcare, property
- Number of employees: c. 6,000 (2024)
- Website: inyatsigroup.africa

Inyatsi Group Holdings is a privately held conglomerate headquartered in Manzini, Eswatini. Founded in 1982 as a construction firm, it has since expanded into mining, telecommunications, insurance, healthcare, manufacturing, media and property. Its construction subsidiaries operate in several countries in Southern Africa and East Africa.

The group is chaired by Zambian-born businessman Michelo Shakantu, who joined the company in 2009. It was the main contractor for Eswatini's International Convention Centre, opened in 2026.

== History ==
Inyatsi Construction Ltd was first registered in Swaziland (now Eswatini) in 1982. Following changes in shareholding and expansion into neighbouring markets, Inyatsi Construction Group Holdings (Pty) Ltd was incorporated in 2007 as the holding company for Inyatsi and its regional subsidiaries.

In September 2009, the group acquired Construction Associates, a building contractor established in 1977, which became its vertical-construction arm. Michelo Shakantu joined the group in the same year and subsequently led its diversification into healthcare, telecommunications, insurance and mining.

== Operations ==
The group describes itself as operating across construction, mining, telecommunications, financial services, healthcare, insurance, manufacturing, media and property. Company statements have variously described its footprint as spanning nine or eleven African countries.

=== Subsidiaries ===
- Inyatsi Construction – civil engineering and infrastructure, including roads, bridges, water treatment plants and dams. It has operated in Eswatini, South Africa, Botswana, Mozambique, Namibia and Zambia.
- Construction Associates – building contractor, founded 1977, acquired 2009.
- Infracast – manufacturer of precast concrete products, based in Matsapha.
- Eswatini Mobile – mobile network operator launched in 2017, the country's second after MTN Eswatini.
- Lidwala Insurance – short-term insurer established in 2009.
- The Clinic Group – private healthcare provider operating clinics in Mbabane, Manzini and Matsapha.
- Maloma Colliery – anthracite coal mine. Inyatsi holds a 50% stake, with the remainder divided between the royal investment vehicle Tibiyo Taka Ngwane and the Eswatini government.
- Eswatini Meat Industries – meat processing.

=== Financial reporting ===
As a private company, Inyatsi does not publish audited results publicly. In 2024 the group stated that it had recorded turnover of more than R8.2 billion, employed over 6,000 people, and paid more than R600 million to the Eswatini government in taxes and dividends.

== Projects ==
=== Ezulwini Palazzo (International Convention Centre) ===
Inyatsi Group Holdings, through its subsidiaries Inyatsi Construction and Construction Associates, built Eswatini's International Convention Centre at Ezulwini, a government project implemented under the Ministry of Economic Planning and Development. The 42,000 m² complex was officially opened by Mswati III on 25 April 2026 during celebrations marking the 40th anniversary of his reign and his 58th birthday, and was named Ezulwini Palazzo. The opening was attended by Letsie III of Lesotho, South African president Cyril Ramaphosa and Zambian president Hakainde Hichilema, among other regional figures. The centre is operated under management contract by Palazzo Hospitality, a Dubai-based hotel group.

== See also ==
- Economy of Eswatini
- Tibiyo Taka Ngwane
