= Wissel (surname) =

Wissel is a surname of German origin. Notable people with the surname include:

- Adolf Wissel (1894–1973), German genre painter
- Christian Wissel, German physicist
- Derek von Wissel, politician and businessman from Swaziland
- Hal Wissel (1939–2025), American basketball coach
- Max Wissel (born 1989), German former racing driver
- Rudolf Wissell (1869–1962), German politician

== See also ==
- Diederik Wissels (born 1960), Dutch jazz pianist
- Pearl van der Wissel (born 1984), Dutch handballer
- Frederick von Wissell (died 1820), British Army officer during the Napoleonic Wars
- Rudolf Wissell (1869–1962), German politician, a member of the Reichstag during the Weimar Republic
