= Vincent Mhlanga =

Swazi politician Born March 1951 (died 2020)

Prime Minister of Eswatini Acting
- In office 5 September 2018 – 27 October 2018
- Monarch: Mswati III
- Preceded by: Barnabas Sibusiso Dlamini
- Succeeded by: Mandvulo Ambrose Dlamini

Personal details
- Died: 24 December 2020 Eswatini

Vincent Mhlanga (died 24 December 2020) was a Swazi politician who served as acting Prime Minister of Eswatini from August to October 2013 and in September to October 2018. With a PhD in Finance, Mhlanga was a managing director at FINCORP, SIDC, and served on numerous boards. Most recently, Mhlanga was a managing director at the King's Office.

He died of COVID-19 during the COVID-19 pandemic in Eswatini on 24 December 2020.

== Acting Prime Minister ==
On 4 September 2018, Prime Minister Barnabas Dlamini and his 18 cabinet ministers were relieved of their duties, in an announcement made by Attorney General Sifiso Khumalo on 6 September. Mhlanga was named Acting Prime Minister and commenced his duties on 7 September, and served until national elections scheduled for 21 September.

Political offices
Preceded by Barnabas Sibusiso Dlamini	Prime Minister of Eswatini; 2018	Succeeded by Mandvulo Ambrose Dlamini
