= List of banks in Eswatini =

This is a list of commercial banks in Eswatini, as updated late 2024 by the Central Bank of Eswatini.

- First National Bank of Eswatini, part of FirstRand Group
- Standard Bank Eswatini Limited, part of Standard Bank Group
- Nedbank Eswatini Limited, part of Nedbank Group
- Eswatini Bank, state-owned
- Swaziland Building Society

== See also ==
- List of banks in Africa
- Central Bank of Eswatini
- Economy of Eswatini
