= Tsandzile Dlamini =

Princess and politician in Eswatini

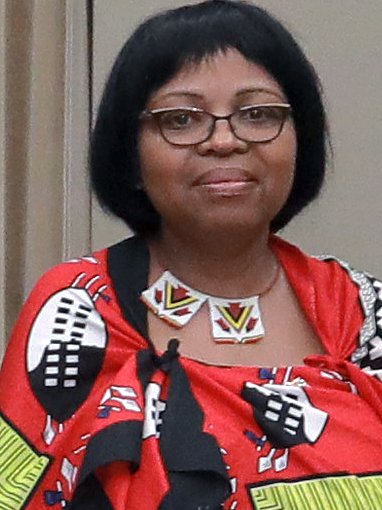

Minister for Home Affairs
- In office 4 November 2013 – 2018
- Succeeded by: Princess Lindiwe

Minister of Natural Resources and Energy
- In office 2008–2013

House of Assembly of Eswatini Member
- In office 2003–?

Personal details
- Spouse: Musa Mdluli (m. 1989)
- Children: 2
- Parent: King Sobhuza II (father)
- Relatives: King Mswati III (brother)
- House: House of Dlamini

Princess Tsandzile Dlamini is a Swazi royal and politician who served as Minister of Home Affairs from 2013 to 2018.

== Early life and education ==
Dlamini is the daughter of King Sobhuza II and Inkhosikati Gogo Mngometulu and the younger sister of King Mswati III. She has a degree in psychology from Boston and a master's degree in Archives Administration from India.

== Career ==
Dlamini worked as an archivist. She was appointed a Member of House of Assembly of Eswatini in 2003, one of the king's ten constitutionally allowed appointments, along with two other brothers. In 2008, she was appointed Minister of Natural Resources and Energy. In 2010, she was named as one of a number of ministers who were allowed to buy 'crown land' at below market value in a "questionable land deal." On 4 November 2013, she was appointed Minister for Home Affairs.

== Personal life ==
Dlamini has been married to Musa Mdluli since 1989 and they have two children. In 2016, the king received a gift of 140 cattle as a bride price for her.
