= Majozi Sithole =

Minister of Finance of Eswatini

Minister of Finance
- In office February 2001 – November 2013
- Preceded by: John Philip Carmichael
- Succeeded by: Martin Dlamini

Majozi V. Sithole is a retired politician from Eswatini.

Sithole was a lecturer at the University of Swaziland, and was elected into parliament in 1998. He was first appointed in the Cabinet of Swaziland in 1998. He was appointed as the Minister of Finance from February 2001 until 2013, when he was appointed to the Central Bank of Eswatini.

Sithole was appointed as the Governor of the Central Bank of Eswatini from November 2013 to July 2022, when he retired. He was already past the retirement age of 60.
