= Sibongile Ndlela-Simelane =

Politician from Eswatini

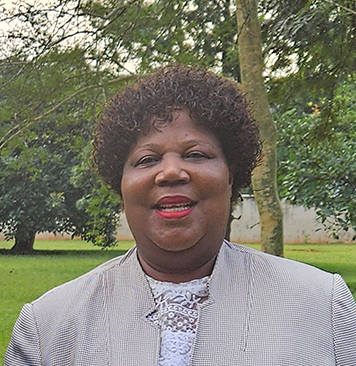

Minister of Health
- In office 2013 – 6 November 2018
- Prime Minister: Barnabas Sibusiso Dlamini
- Preceded by: Benedict Xaba
- Succeeded by: Lizzy Nkosi

Personal details
- Occupation: Senator
- Profession: Politician

Sibongile Ndlela-Simelane was Minister for Health for Eswatini from 2013 to 2018 under the government of Barnabas Sibusiso Dlamini. During her time as minister she led calls for lessons from southern Africa's HIV response to be applied to malaria. She also commissioned on World TB Day in 2017 a national drug resistance survey. In 2018 she requested the arrest of an Eswatini Observer journalist who had photographed the cars of government ministers. She also commissioned new offices for the Swaziland Nursing Council.

In 2022, she was appointed Chairperson of the Eswatini Communications Commission (ESSCOM).

Ndlela-Simelane grew up in a single-parent family and announced in 2015 at Bulandzeni Church of the Nazarene that she had never met her father.
