= Lizzy Nkosi =

Swazi politician

Minister of Health
- Incumbent
- Assumed office 6 November 2018
- Prime Minister: Ambrose Mandvulo Dlamini; Cleopas Sipho Dlamini
- Preceded by: Sibongile Ndlela-Simelane

Personal details
- Party: Independent
- Occupation: Senator
- Profession: Politician

Lizzy Nkosi is a Swazi politician and the current Minister of Health of Eswatini. In November 2018, King Mswati III announced the formation of his new cabinet and named Nkosi as Minister of Health. She took office on 6 November and succeeded Sibongile Ndlela-Simelane. Nkosi also serves as a Senator.

Political offices
Preceded by Sibongile Ndlela-Simelane	Minister of Health; 2018–present	Incumbent
