= Southern African Customs Union =

Customs union of five countries in Southern Africa

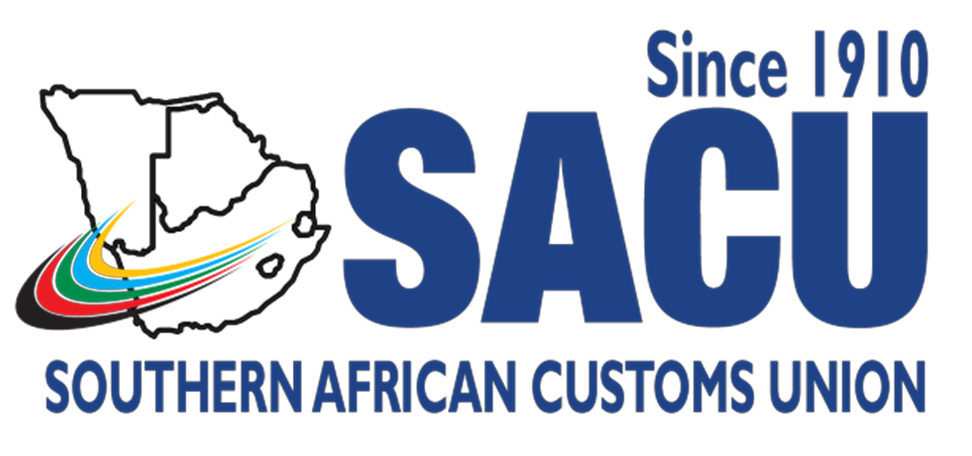
- Logo

- Members of the SACU
- Headquarters: Windhoek
- Largest city: Johannesburg
- Official language: English (de facto)^{a}
- Demonym: Southern African
- Type: Customs union
- Membership: 5 states: Botswana; Eswatini; Lesotho; Namibia; South Africa

Leaders
  - SACU Chair: Lesotho
  - SACU Executive Secretary: T.D. Khasipe
- Establishment: 1910

Area
  - Total: 2,672,830 km^{2} (1,031,990 sq mi)

Population
  - 2026 estimate: ▲74.44 million
- GDP (PPP): 2026 estimate
  - Total: ▲$1.179 trillion
  - Per capita: ▲$15,833
- GDP (nominal): 2026 estimate
  - Total: ▲$488.42 billion
  - Per capita: ▼$6,559
- Gini (2015): ▼59.0 high inequality
- HDI (2021): ▼0.696 medium
- Currency: Pula (BWP; Botswana); Rand (ZAR; South Africa); Lilangeni (SZL; Eswatini) ^{b}; Loti (LSL; Lesotho) ^{b}; Namibian dollar (NAD; Namibia) ^{b}
- Time zone: UTC+2 (SAST)
- Website sacu.int
- ^{a} The union has no official languages. However, English is the de facto working language of the SACU and an official language in all member states.; ^{b} Currency pegged to the South African Rand (ZAR).

The Southern African Customs Union (SACU) is a customs union among five countries of Southern Africa: Botswana, Eswatini, Lesotho, Namibia and South Africa. Its headquarters are in the Namibian capital, Windhoek. It was established in 1910.

== History ==
The SACU is the oldest existing customs union in the world.

The first customs union in the area was established in 1889 between the British Cape Colony and the Boer republic of the Orange Free State. In 1891 British Bechuanaland and Basutoland joined, followed by Bechuanaland Protectorate in 1893 and Natal in 1899. Parallel to this process, the Boer republic of the South African Republic and Swaziland (then a protectorate of the South African Republic) formed a customs union in 1894.

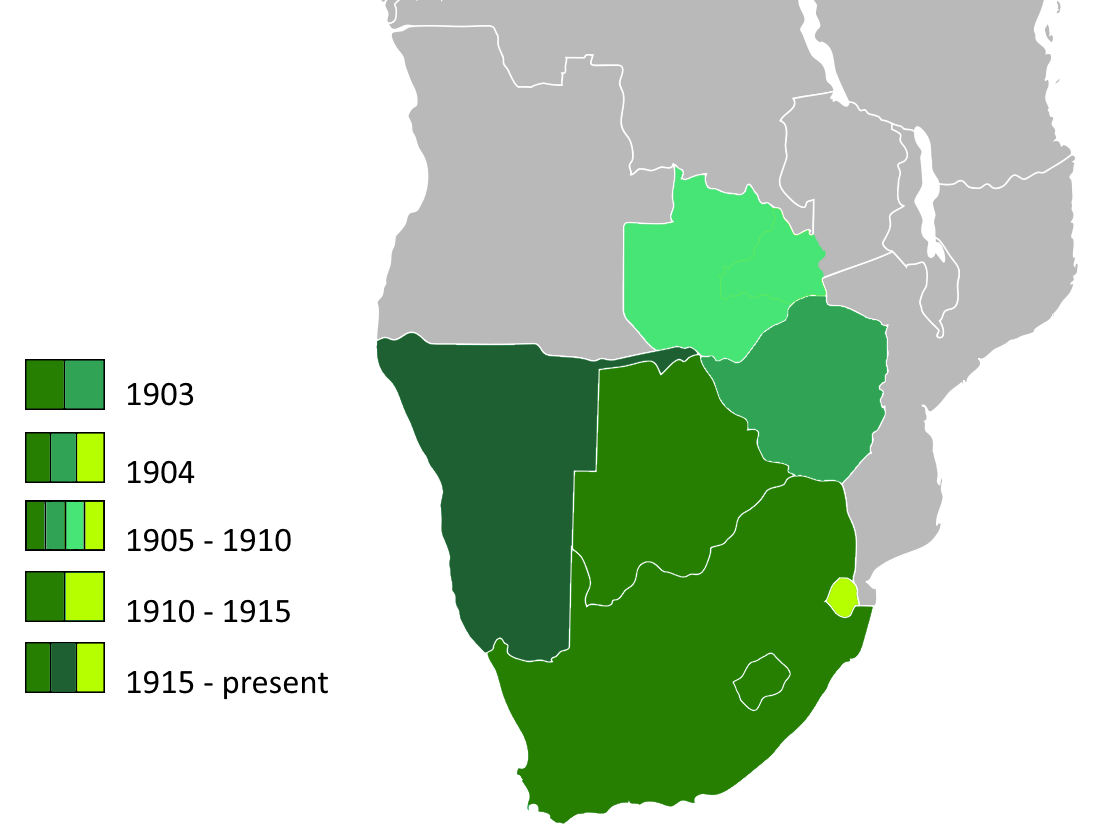
Evolution of the Southern African Customs Union from 1903 to the present day based on Southern African Customs Union.svg, and information found in Brief Chronology of Customs Agreements in Southern Africa, 1855–1979 by Derek J. Hudson. The light green area in Zambia represents the extent of the territory of North-western Rhodesia in 1905 when it joined the customs union

Following the Second Boer War, and the establishment of British control over the Boer republics, the Southern African Customs Union was formed in 1903 with the signing of a new Convention and replaced the previous arrangements. It consisted of Cape Colony (to which British Bechuanaland had been annexed in 1895), Basutoland, Bechuanaland Protectorate, Natal, Orange River Colony (the former Orange Free State), Transvaal Colony (the former South African Republic), and Southern Rhodesia. Swaziland joined in 1904 and North-western Rhodesia joined in 1905. In 1906 another convention was signed which superseded the 1903 agreement and retained all of the previous members. In its current configuration it was established in 1910 pursuant to a Customs Union Agreement between the Union of South Africa and the High Commission Territories of Bechuanaland, Basutoland and Swaziland. Southern Rhodesia and North-western Rhodesia (later to become Northern Rhodesia after 1911) had declined to join the 1910 Agreement but did maintain a common tariff and free trade arrangements with South Africa and the High Commission Territories (with some variations and exceptions) from 1910 until 1935. An attempt was made in 1949 to re-establish a customs union between South Africa and Southern Rhodesia, but it ultimately failed to do so.

With the advent of independence for the High Commission territories, the agreement was updated and, on 11 December 1969, it was relaunched as the SACU with the signing of an agreement between the South Africa, Botswana, Lesotho and Swaziland. The updated union officially entered into force on 1 March 1970. After Namibia's independence from South Africa in 1990, it joined SACU as its fifth member, although it had been effectively a part of the customs union from the time of its conquest by South Africa in 1915 (with the situation formalized in 1921 with arrangements between South Africa and the South West Africa). Historically SACU was administered by South Africa, through the 1910 and 1969 Agreements. The customs union collected duties on local production and customs duties on members' imports from outside SACU.

As of 2007, the Executive Secretary of the SACU was Tswelopele C. Moremi. Paulina Mbala Elago, a Namibian national, became executive secretary on 1 April 2014 for a period of five years. Thabo David Khasipe was appointed as executive secretary on 1 February 2023.

== Member states ==
Member states surface area and populations
Country	Area (km^{2})	Population
Botswana	581,730	2,81 million
Eswatini	17,360	1,19 million
Lesotho	30,360	2,42 million
Namibia	824,290	3,11 million
South Africa	1,219,090	64.91 million

== Functions and organisation ==
The union meets annually to discuss matters related to the Agreement. In addition, the Customs Technical Liaison Committee, the Trade and Industry Liaison committee and the Ad hoc Sub-Committee on Agriculture each meet three times a year.

Its aim is to maintain the free interchange of goods between member countries. It provides for a common external tariff and a common excise tariff to this common customs area. All customs and excise collected in the common customs area are paid into South Africa's National Revenue Fund. The revenue is shared among members according to a revenue-sharing formula, as described in the agreement. South Africa is the custodian of this pool. Only the BLNS Member states' shares are calculated, with South Africa retaining the residual. SACU revenue constitutes a substantial share of the state revenue of the BLNS countries.

== Developments and structure ==
Following the formation of the Government of National Unity in South Africa in April 1994, member states concurred that the existing agreement should be renegotiated to democratise SACU and address needs of the SACU member states more effectively. With this in mind, the Ministers of Trade and Industry of the five member states met in Pretoria on 11 November 1994 to discuss the renegotiation of the 1969 agreement. The Ministers appointed a Customs Union Task Team (CUTT), which was mandated to make recommendations to the Ministers. CUTT has met on numerous occasions in the member states, and declares that good progress has been made in the renegotiation process.

At a meeting of Ministers of Trade and Finance Departments from the SACU member states, held in Centurion, Pretoria on 5 September 2000, the Ministers reached consensus on the principles underpinning institutional reform in the SACU. The institutional administrative structure of the revenue pool was agreed as follows:

Council of Ministers
Consisting of one minister from each SACU member state, it would be the supreme SACU decision-making body and would meet quarterly. The decisions taken by this council would only be by consensus.
Commission
An administrative body composed of senior officials, three technical liaison committees and an established Agricultural Liaison Committee.
Tribunal
An independent body of experts. It would report directly to the Council of Ministers. The tribunal would be responsible for tariff-setting and the anti-dumping mechanism.
Secretariat
Responsible for day-to-day operations of the pool. It would be funded from the revenue pool. Its location would be determined by senior officials who were directed to meet after one month to develop proposals for the implementation of the revised SACU institutional structure.

SACU ministers further agreed that the revenue share accruing to each member state should be calculated from three basic components:

- a share of the customs pool;
- a share of the excise pool; and
- a share of a development component.

By agreement, these components would be distributed as follows:

- The customs component, allocated according to each country's share of total intra-SACU trade, including re-exports.
- The excise component, net of the development component, allocated on the basis of GDP.
- The development component, fixed at 15% of the total excise pool and distributed to all SACU members in an inverse proportion to each country's GDP/capita.

While SACU entered into a free trade deal with the four-nation European Free Trade Association on 1 July 2006, its negotiations with the United States for a free trade agreement have stalled (as of 8 January 2008).

SACU is involved in negotiations for a free trade agreement – the Economic Partnership Agreements (EPAs) – with the EU, and the organisation corresponded with the EU Trade Commissioner, Karel De Gucht, between February and March 2010, to request that the EU not demand ratification and implementation of the EPAs at the next round of negotiations without the concerns of the SACU countries being addressed. De Gucht replied that he would like to "invite the SADC EPA countries concerned to swiftly complete signature, notification and implementation of the interim EPA" and that "in the meantime, the EU is more than willing to address all pending issues and concerns."

== Comparison with other regional blocs ==
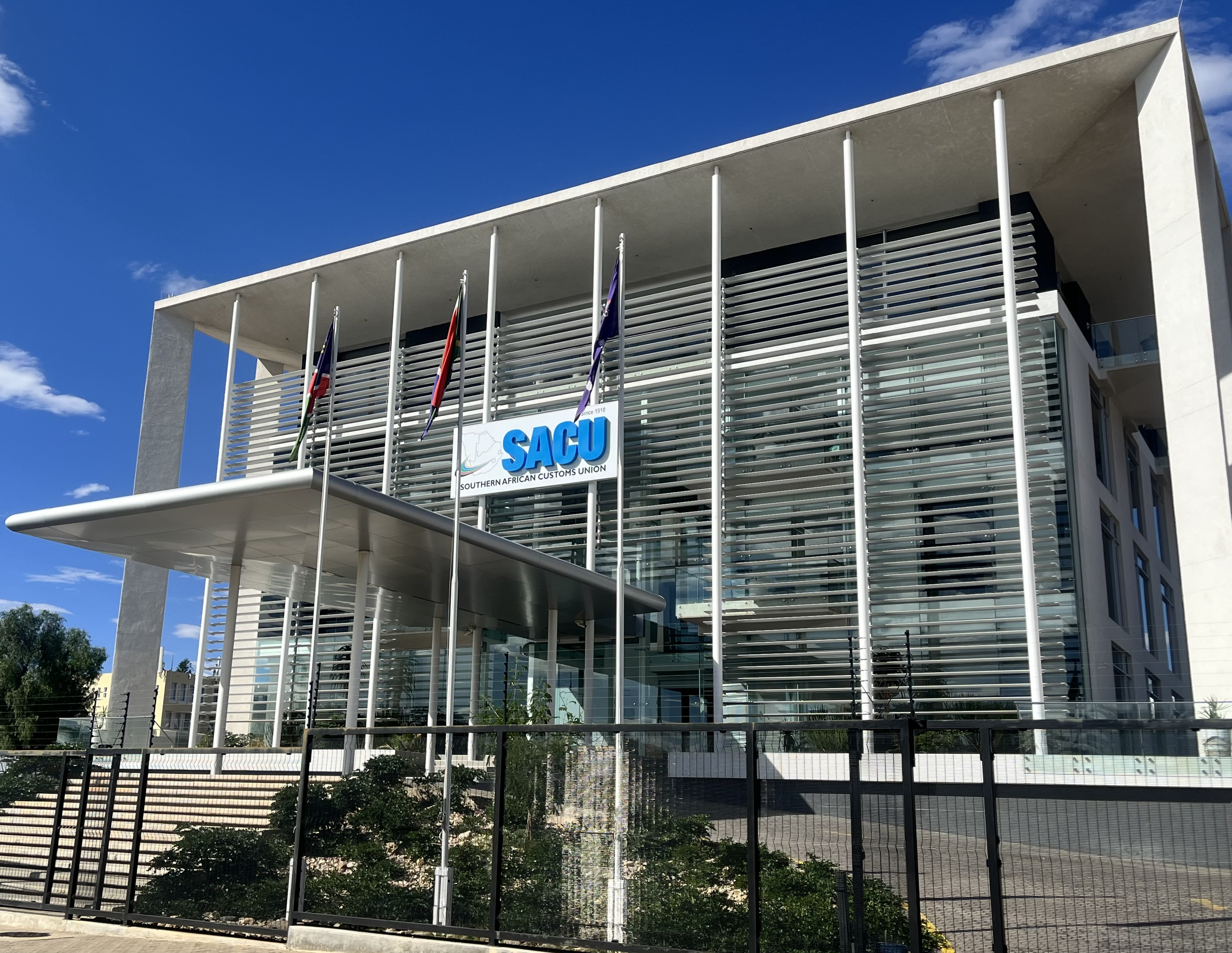
SACU headquarters in Windhoek

African Economic Community
Pillar regional blocs (REC)	Area (km²)	Population	GDP (PPP) ($US)		Member states
Pillar regional blocs (REC)	Area (km²)	Population	(millions)	(per capita)	Member states
EAC	5,449,717	349,966,685	737,420	2,149	8
ECOWAS/CEDEAO	5,112,903	349,154,000	1,322,452	3,788	15
IGAD	5,233,604	294,197,387	225,049	1,197	7
AMU/UMA ^{4}	6,046,441	106,919,526	1,299,173	12,628	5
ECCAS/CEEAC	6,667,421	218,261,591	175,928	1,451	11
SADC	9,882,959	394,845,175	737,392	3,152	15
COMESA	12,873,957	406,102,471	735,599	1,811	20
CEN-SAD ^{4}	14,680,111				29
Total AEC	29,910,442	853,520,010	2,053,706	2,406	54
Other regional blocs	Area (km²)	Population	GDP (PPP) ($US)		Member states
Other regional blocs	Area (km²)	Population	(millions)	(per capita)	Member states
WAMZ ^{1}	1,602,991	264,456,910	1,551,516	5,867	6
SACU ^{1}	2,693,418	51,055,878	541,433	10,605	5
CEMAC ^{2}	3,020,142	34,970,529	85,136	2,435	6
UEMOA ^{1}	3,505,375	80,865,222	101,640	1,257	8
UMA ^{2} ^{4}	5,782,140	84,185,073	491,276	5,836	5
GAFTA ^{3} ^{4}	5,876,960	1,662,596	6,355	3,822	5
AES	2,780,159	71,374,000	179,347		3
During 2004. Sources: The World Factbook 2005, IMF WEO Database. Smallest value among the blocs compared. Largest value among the blocs compared.^{1}: Economic bloc inside a pillar REC.^{2}: Proposed for pillar REC, but objecting participation.^{3}: Non-African members of GAFTA are excluded from figures.^{4}: The area 446,550 km^{2} used for Morocco excludes all disputed territories, while 710,850 km^{2} would include the Moroccan-claimed and partially-controlled parts of Western Sahara (claimed as the Sahrawi Arab Democratic Republic by the Polisario Front). Morocco also claims Ceuta and Melilla, making up about 22.8 km^{2} (8.8 sq mi) more claimed territory.

== See also ==
- 1903 Southern African Customs Union Agreement
- Trade bloc
- Common Monetary Area
- Southern Africa Customs Union and Mozambique–United Kingdom Economic Partnership Agreement
- Southern African Development Community (SADC)
- Common Market for Eastern and Southern Africa (COMESA)
- Rules of origin
- Market access
- Free-trade area
- Tariff
