= 1903 Southern African Customs Union Agreement =

1903 multilateral treaty of Southern Africa

The 1903 Southern African Customs Union Agreement was a multilateral treaty between the British colonies and protectorates in Southern Africa that created a customs union between the territories.

After the British victory in the Second Boer War, movements began to unify and consolidate British holdings in Southern Africa. The 1903 Customs Union Agreement was signed by the parties to the Agreement over the course of a month in several different locations. The dates on which it was signed were 6, 12, and 25 May and 3 June 1903, and signings took place in Johannesburg, Pietermaritzburg, Douglas, and Salisbury. The Agreement was signed by the governments of the Cape Colony, the Colony of Natal, the Orange River Colony, the Transvaal Colony, and Southern Rhodesia. The Governor of the Cape Colony, who was the High Commissioner for Southern Africa, also signed on behalf of Basutoland and the Bechuanaland Protectorate. Swaziland was admitted to the union in a supplementary protocol that was agreed to in 1904, while North-western Rhodesia was admitted in 1905.

The Agreement established a customs union area with free trade amongst the parties. The success of the customs union encouraged some British residents to seek political unification, which ultimately resulted in the creation of the Union of South Africa in 1910. (Basutoland, Southern Rhodesia, and Swaziland did not join the political union.) In 1910, the Southern African Customs Union was created as the successor to the 1903 union; however, Southern Rhodesia did not join the 1910 customs union.
