= COVID-19 vaccination in Eswatini =

Plan to immunize against COVID-19

- Date: March 19, 2021 – present
- Location: Eswatini
- Cause: COVID-19 pandemic
- Motive: COVID-19 pandemic in Eswatini

COVID-19 vaccination in Eswatini is an ongoing immunisation campaign against severe acute respiratory syndrome coronavirus 2 (SARS-CoV-2), the virus that causes coronavirus disease 2019 (COVID-19), in response to the ongoing pandemic in the country.

Eswatini began its vaccination program on 19 March 2021. In early May 2021, it was reported that Eswatini had administered all of the doses it had so far received.

== History ==
=== Timeline ===
==== March 2021 ====
- March 2021: Eswatini receives 20,000 of the Oxford-AstraZeneca/Covishield vaccine, donated by India, and 12,000 doses of the same vaccine through COVAX.
- 19 March 2021: launch of targeted vaccination campaign.
- By the end of March, 9,871 vaccine doses had been administered.

==== April 2021 ====
- By the end of April, 34,897 vaccine doses had been administered.

==== May 2021 ====
- By the end of May, 34,897 vaccine doses had been administered.

==== June 2021 ====
- By the end of June, 34,897 vaccine doses had been administered.

==== July 2021 ====
- 27 July 2021: Eswatini receives 300,000 doses of the Janssen COVID-19 vaccine donated by the United States.
- By the end of July, 66,553 vaccine doses had been administered and 27,227 persons fully vaccinated (6% of the targeted population).

==== August 2021 ====
- 3 August 2021: launch of general vaccination campaign.
- By the end of August, 189,424 vaccine doses had been administered and 150,535 persons fully vaccinated (32% of the targeted population).

==== September 2021 ====
- By the end of September, 248,985 vaccine doses had been administered and 210,432 persons fully vaccinated (45% of the targeted population).

==== October 2021 ====
- By the end of October, 274,379 vaccine doses had been administered and 235,360 persons fully vaccinated (50% of the targeted population).

==== November 2021 ====
- By the end of November, 306,445 vaccine doses had been administered and 260,763 persons fully vaccinated (56% of the targeted population).

==== December 2021 ====
- By the end of December, 401,306 vaccine doses had been administered and 302,304 persons fully vaccinated (64% of the targeted population).

==== January 2022 ====
- By the end of January, 475,718 vaccine doses had been administered and 334,851 persons fully vaccinated (70% of the targeted population).

==== February 2022 ====
- By the end of February, half a million vaccine doses had been administered and 336,066 persons fully vaccinated.

==== March 2022 ====
- By the end of March, 509,424 vaccine doses had been administered and 336,066 persons fully vaccinated.

==== April 2022 ====
- By the end of April, 535,393 vaccine doses had been administered and 336,066 persons fully vaccinated.

== Progress ==
27,226 persons had been fully vaccinated by the end of July 2021, 150,535 by the end of August, 210,432 by the end of September, 235,360 by the end of October, 260,763 by the end of November, and 401,306 (64% of the target population) by the end of December 2021.
