= Tibiyo Taka Ngwane =

Sovereign wealth fund of Eswatini

- Company type: Investment company
- Industry: Investment management
- Founded: 1968
- Founder: King Sobhuza II, the people of Swaziland
- Headquarters: Kwaluseni, Eswatini
- Key people: Themba Dlamini, Mswati III
- Products: Publishing; Beverages; Property Development; Hospitality; Agriculture; Mining; Finance
- Revenue: ▲ E218.1m (2012)
- Net income: ▲ E116m (2012)
- Total assets: ▲ E1.39 billion (2012)
- Owner: King Mswati III in trust for the people of Eswatini
- Website: https://www.tibiyo.com

Tibiyo Taka Ngwane, meaning wealth of the nation, is a Swazi sovereign wealth fund which was created through royal charter under the reign of King Sobhuza II in 1968. The company is currently held by King Mswati III in trust for the Swazi nation and is separate from the government.

It was formed by King Sobhuza II at independence in 1968 by Royal Charter to promote and encourage peace and stability, to preserve culture and tradition and to promote a high standard of living for the Swazi Nation through provision of employment. It has stakes in agriculture, property, a printing company, and it is the sole owner of the Eswatini Observer. Tibiyo is a shareholder in many companies such as the Royal Eswatini Sugar Corporation (RES Corporation), Maloma Colliery Limited, Lubombo Sugar, Parmalat Swaziland, Simunye Plaza, Bhuna Mall, Swazi Spar Holdings, Eswatini Beverages, Alexander Forbes, Fincorp, Tibiyo Leisure Resorts trading as Royal Villas and many subsidiaries across the country.

In 2009 a group of Swazi organisations called for Tibiyo Taka Ngwane to be converted to a government department that would be open for public scrutiny.
