= Eswatini Bank =

- Type: Public
- Industry: Finance
- Founded: 1965 (age 60–61)
- Headquarters: Mbabane, Eswatini
- Key people: Sibongile Mdluli; Chairperson; Zakhele Lukhele; Managing Director
- Products: Banking
- Owner: Government of Eswatini
- Website: Homepage

Eswatini Bank, also known as Eswatini Development & Savings Bank (EDSP), is a development finance institution, which doubles as a commercial bank in Eswatini. It is licensed and supervised by the Central Bank of Eswatini, the national banking regulator. As of April 2019 Eswatini Bank was the only indigenous commercial bank in the country, with the other three having their headquarters in neighboring South Africa.

== Location ==
The headquarters of Eswatini Bank are located in the Engungwini Building, on Gwamile Street, in Mbabane, the capital and largest city in Eswatini.

== History ==
The bank was established in 1965 by Sobhuza II, who reigned from 10 December 1899 until 21 August 1982, to finance development projects in the county. In 2014, Eswatini Bank, in collaboration with MasterCard International, began issuing credit and debit card branded with the MasterCard logo.

== Ownership ==
Eswatini Bank is 100 percent owned by the Government of Eswatini.

== Branches ==
As of March 2018, the bank maintains branches at the following locations:

1. Main Branch: Engungwini Building, Gwamile Street, Mbabane
2. Mbabane Commercial Branch: Umlunguzi Wendlovu Building, Mbabane
3. Manzini Branch: Nkoseluhlaza Street, Manzini
4. Matsapha Branch: Matsapha Shopping Complex, Matsapha
5. Piggs Peak Branch: Evelyn Baring Avenue, Piggs Peak
6. Nhlangano Branch: 5th Street, Nhlangano
7. Siteki Branch: Jacaranda Avenue, Siteki
8. Matata Branch: Matata Shopping Complex, Matata
9. Simunye Branch: Simunye Shopping Complex, Simunye
10. Siphofaneni Branch: Nokuphila Shopping Complex, Siphofaneni
11. Gables Branch: The Gables Shopping Complex, Ezulwini Valley.

== See also ==
- List of banks in Eswatini
- List of banks in South Africa
