= John Philip Carmichael =

Minister of Finance of Eswatini

John Carmichael

Minister of Finance
- In office November 1998 – February 2001
- Preceded by: Themba Masuku
- Succeeded by: Majozi Sithole

Personal details
- Born: 1 August 1947
- Died: 2019 (aged 71–72)

John Philip Carmichael was politician, businessman and botanist from Swaziland.

He was born on 1 August 1947. His forefathers settled to Swaziland from Scotland in 1800s. He was the owner and mastermind behind the establishment of Summerfield Botanical Gardens in 1980s.

Carmichael was minister of housing and urban development from 1993 to 1998. He was the minister of finance of Swaziland from November 1998 to February 2001. He was then appointed as minister of education until 2003, when he was appointed as minister of public works and transport. He left the cabinet in 2003.

Carmichael died in 2019.
