= Paul Dlamini =

Swazi politician

Deputy Prime Minister of Eswatini
- In office 2013 – 6 November 2018
- Monarch: Mswati III
- Preceded by: Themba N. Masuku
- Succeeded by: Themba N. Masuku

Personal details
- Party: Independent

Paul Dlamini is a Swazi politician who was deputy prime minister of Eswatini from to 2013 to 2018. He was the first of the Dlamini clan to be appointed to such a high position in the national government. In October 2015 he led an eight-member delegation to Taiwan to support celebration of the 104th National Day of the Republic of China.
