= Central Bank of Eswatini =

State-owned bank in Eswatini

Central Bank of Eswatini Umntsholi Wemaswati

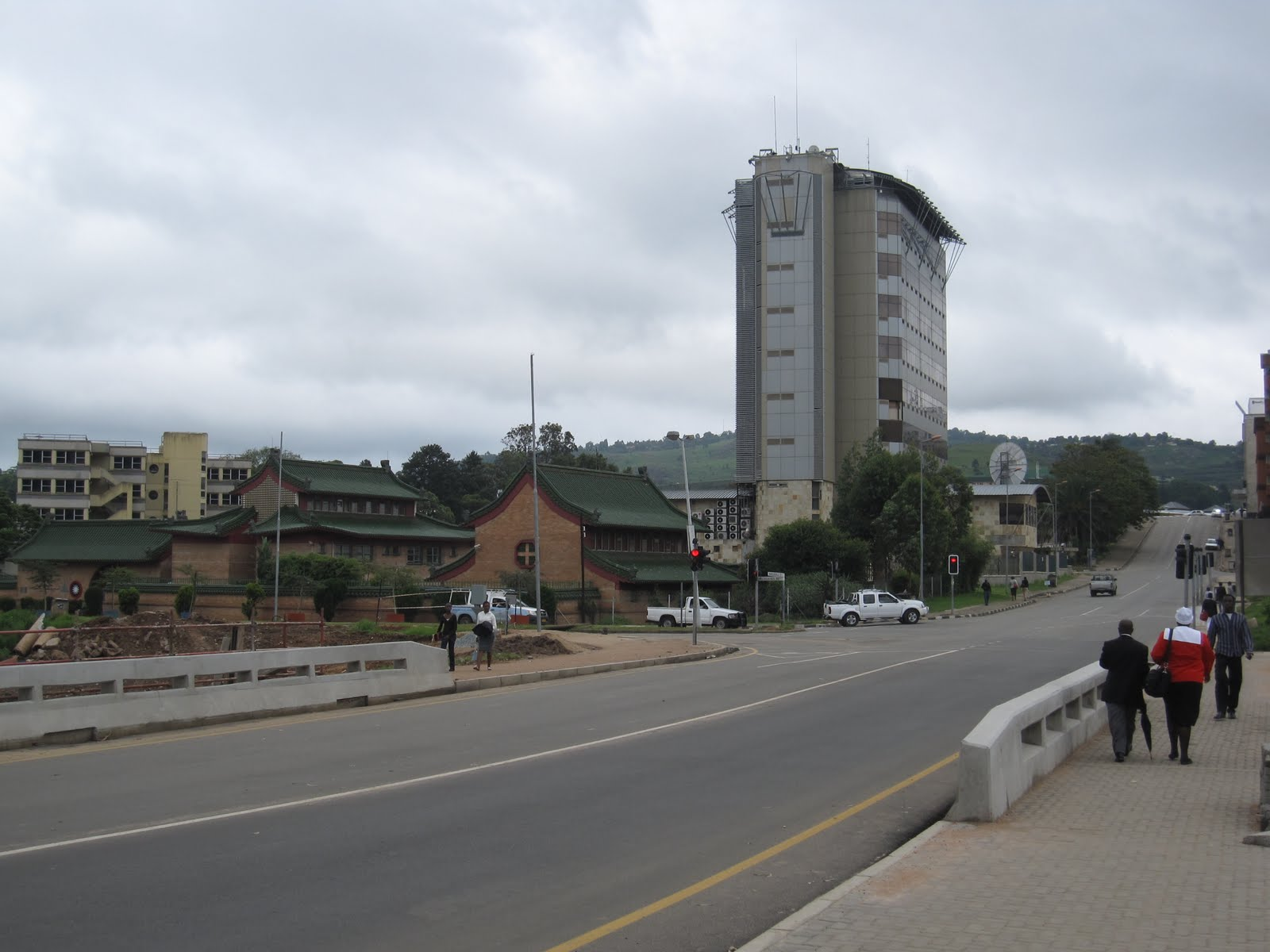
- Central Bank building in Mbabane
- Central bank of: Eswatini
- Headquarters: Mahlokohla St., Mbabane
- Coordinates: 26°19′33″S 31°08′51″E
- Established: 1 April 1974
- Ownership: 100% state ownership
- Governor: Phil Mnisi
- Currency: Swazi lilangeni SZL (ISO 4217)
- Reserves: 470 million USD
- Website: www.centralbank.org.sz

The Central Bank of Eswatini (Swazi: Umntsholi Wemaswati), is the central bank of Eswatini. It was established in April 1974 and is based in capital Mbabane. According to the bank's website, the bank's mission is to promote monetary stability and foster a stable and sound financial system. Among the bank's responsibilities are managing Eswatini's foreign exchange position and safeguarding the country's foreign reserves of cash. The bank conducts weekly auctions of 91-day Swazi treasury bills, through "primary dealer" Swazi banks. The current governor is Dr. Phil Mnisi.

The Central Bank is nominally independent, but is in practice overruled by Eswatini's absolute monarchy.

== Governors ==
The governor of the bank is appointed by the King of Eswatini for a term of five years.

- Ethan Mayisela, April 1974 - June 1978
- A. D. Ockenden, acting, June 1978 - June 1981
- H. B. B. Oliver, July 1981 - June 1992
- Martin Dlamini, acting, 1992
- James Nxumalo, July 1992 - June 1997
- Martin Dlamini, July 1997 - November 2013
- Majozi Sithole, November 2013 - July 2022
- Dr. Phil Mnisi, 2022 - present

== List of authorized banks of Eswatini ==
- Eswatini Bank
- Standard Bank Eswatini
- First National Bank Swaziland
- Nedbank Swaziland
- Swaziland Building Society

== See also ==
- Swazi lilangeni
- Economy of Eswatini
- List of finance ministers of Eswatini
- List of central banks of Africa
- List of central banks
- List of financial supervisory authorities by country
