= List of finance ministers of Eswatini =

This is a list of finance ministers of Eswatini since the formation of the post to present day.

== Ministers of finance ==
Name	Took office	Left office	Notes
Leo Lovell	1967	1972	
Robert P. Stephens	June 1972	January 1979	
James Lawrence Funwako Simelane	January 1979	November 1983	
Sishayi Nxumalo	November 1983	June 1984	
Barnabas Sibusiso Dlamini	August 1984	November 1993	
Solomon Dlamini	1993	1993	
Isaac Shabangu	November 1993	March 1995	
Derek von Wissel	March 1995	November 1996	
Themba N. Masuku	November 1996	November 1998	
John Philip Carmichael	November 1998	February 2001	
Majozi Sithole	February 2001	November 2013	
Martin Dlamini	November 2013	November 2018	
Neal Rijkenberg	November 2018	Incumbent	

== See also ==
- Economy of Eswatini
- Central Bank of Eswatini
