= Princess Lindiwe =

Swazi princess, pastor and politician (died 2026)

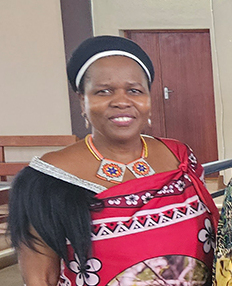

Minister of Home Affairs
- In office 2018–2026
- Monarch: Mswati III
- Prime Minister: Russell Dlamini
- Preceded by: Tsandzile Dlamini

Personal details
- Died: 16 September 2026 South Africa
- Spouse: Robert Kasaro
- Parent: King Sobhuza II (father)
- Relatives: King Mswati III (brother)
- Education: University of Akron; Vincennes University

Princess Lindiwe Dlamini (died 16 September 2026) was a Swazi royal, politician and Christian pastor. She served as the Minister of Home Affairs of Eswatini and as a member of the House of Assembly from 2018 until her death in 2026. Lindiwe was the daughter of Sobhuza II and a sister of Mswati III.

== Education ==
Lindiwe got a degree in business administration from the University of Akron and an associate degree in hotel management from the Vincennes University, both in the United States.

== Career ==
Lindiwe began her professional career in 1985 as an administrator at the Eswatini National Administration Office, later becoming a car manufacturing and washing entrepreneur.

In 2008, King Mswati III appointed Lindiwe as a member of the traditional advisory body Liqoqo. In 2018, she became a member of the House of Assembly and Minister of Home Affairs, and was reappointed in 2023.

In December 2025, she called on countries during the international conference on the Role of Women in Modern Society to strengthen international cooperation to "accelerate the empowerment of women". That month, she also stated, in a meeting with religious representatives, that her ministry intends to develop a unified national policy for all churches in the country, rejecting accusations of wanting to control their activities and that the registration of churches would become the responsibility of the Ministry of Home Affairs.

== Personal life and death ==
Together with her husband Robert Kasaro, Lindiwe ran the Jesus Calls Worship Centre (JCWC). On 16 September 2026, she died after a battle with cancer. Her death came a few days after she was rushed to a South African hospital in a critical condition.
