= Savannah Maziya =

Swazi businesswoman and politician (born 1968)

Minister of Information, Communications and Technology
- Incumbent
- Assumed office 22 November 2023
- Monarch: Mswati III
- Prime Minister: Russell Dlamini
- Preceded by: Sikhanyiso Dlamini

Personal details
- Born: 1968 (age 57–58) Siteki, Eswatini
- Education: De Montfort University; Bridgewater State University; Columbia University

Savannah Maziya (born 1968) is a Swazi businesswoman and politician, who has served as Minister of Information, Communications and Technology of Eswatini since 2023. She is also member of the Senate since 2023.

== Early life ==
Maziya was born in 1968 in the town of Siteki, Eswatini. She obtained an MBA in strategy and finance from De Montfort University in the United Kingdom, and a degree in communication and radio broadcasting management from Bridgewater State University in the United States and studied at Columbia University in New York.

== Career ==
In the early 2000s, she led the London-based African Broadcast Network and was also a member of the board of directors of the international mining company Sibanye-Stillwater and the Canadian engineering company WSP Global as executive chairperson of WSP Africa. Maziya has also worked in the banking sector, serving on the board of directors of Standard Bank in Eswatini and other regional organisations. She founded and was the CEO of Bunengi Group of Companies, a South-African based mining company.

She was appointed to the Senate by King Mswati III and took office on 10 November 2023 by Attorney General Sifiso M. Khumalo. On 13 November 2023 she was appointed Minister of Information, Communications and Technology and was sworn in on 22 November 2023.

As Minister of ICT, she highlighted the advantage that Eswatini has as a small country, in that it is easier to roll out digital services across the country and adapt policies, as well as the need to digitise public services in order to modernise the economy and improve the quality of life of the population. One of her key projects has been to facilitate access to administrative services online, providing stable and affordable connectivity, cybersecurity and reducing the digital divide among the population.

In February 2024, she had a meeting with the UN in Eswatini about digital transformation, and in 2025 she was elected chair of the Global SDG 5 Council on Women Empowerment at the World Governments Summit in Dubai. She has launched a STEM mentoring programme aimed especially at girls in rural and vulnerable areas in 2025.

In February 2026 Maziya called for a united global approach to artificial intelligence legislation with small countries having an active role.
