= Jane Mkhonta-Simelane =

Swazi politician

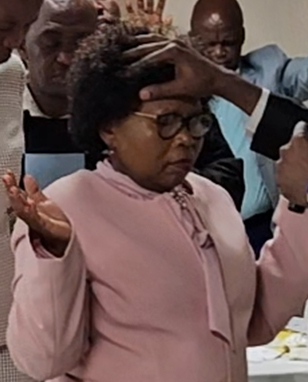
- Mkhonta-Simelane in 2025

Minister of Tourism and Environmental Affairs
- Incumbent
- Assumed office 13 November 2023
- Monarch: Mswati III
- Prime Minister: Russell Dlamini
- Preceded by: Moses Vilakati

Personal details
- Education: University of Pretoria; University of Botswana

Jane Mkhonta-Simelane is a Swazi politician and civil servant, who has been the Minister of Tourism and Environmental Affairs of Eswatini since 2023. She is also member of the House of Assembly since 2023.

== Early life ==
Jane Mkhonta-Simelane obtained a Bachelor of Adult Education from the University of Botswana, a Bachelor of Social Sciences in Gender Studies from the University of Pretoria, where she also obtained a postgraduate degree in Multidisciplinary Human Rights.

In 1984, she began working on the Women in Development Project as head of handicrafts, rising to head of domestic industry in 1992, a position she held until 2000.

She was appointed gender analyst at the Ministry of Home Affairs in 1984 and became head of gender analysis in 2006, a position she held until 2013. During her tenure, Mkhonta-Simelane contributed to the adoption of the National Gender Policy in 2010 and supported regional protocols on gender and development.

In 2013, she was appointed director of gender and family affairs in the office of the deputy prime minister, and between 2020 and 2023 she worked at the Ministry of Tinkhundla Administration and Development. In 2023, she was undersecretary at the Ministry of Tinkhundla Administration and Development until she retired few months later. Her work also contributed to Eswatini's ratification of the Protocol to the African Charter on Human and Peoples' Rights, agricultural reforms benefiting women, and protocols on AIDS.

== Political career ==
In the 2023 general election Mkhonta-Simelane was elected member of the House of Assembly representing Mbabane West. King Mswati III appointed her Minister of Tourism and Environmental Affairs of Eswatini in the cabinet of Prime Minister Russell Dlamini on 13 November 2023.

In 2024, she announced a ban on plastic bags, as well as the need to invest in innovative techniques to make agriculture more sustainable and respectful of the soil, reforestation, improvement of the road network and solutions through nature. Regarding the ban on plastic bags, in October 2025 she denounced an attempt to have her removed from office.

In tourism policy, she reported on the growing trend in tourism to the country in 2025 following the COVID-19 pandemic and the promotion of sustainable tourism, environmental protection and road safety.
