= Eswatini Observer =

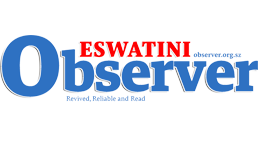
- Type: news website
- Format: Online newspaper
- Founded: 1981
- Language: English
- Headquarters: Eswatini
- Website: eswatiniobserver.com

Eswatini Observer (formerly Swazi Observer) is a newspaper in the Kingdom of Eswatini. It was established in 1981 and it is owned by Tibiyo Taka Ngwane, a Swazi sovereign wealth fund. The Eswatini Observer has sister newspapers, namely, the Saturday Observer, and the Sunday Observer. After the renaming of the country from Swaziland to Eswatini 2018 the newspaper also changed its name from Swazi Observer to Eswatini Observer.
