= Derek von Wissel =

Derek von Wissell

Minister of Finance of Swaziland
- In office March 1995 – November 1996
- Preceded by: Isaac Shabangu
- Succeeded by: Themba Masuku

Derek von Wissell is a politician and businessman from Swaziland.

His family owned one of the largest retailers on Swaziland. He was the president of the Federation of Swaziland Employers.

Von Wissell was appointed minister of commerce and industry in 1980s until 1988. In 1993 he was elected to the Senate of Swaziland. Von Wissell was appointed Minister of Finance of Swaziland from March 1995 to November 1996. Prior this appointment, he was minister of health.

He later worked as a director combating AIDS in Swaziland.
