= Ambrose Mandvulo Dlamini =

Prime Minister of Eswatini from 2018 to 2020

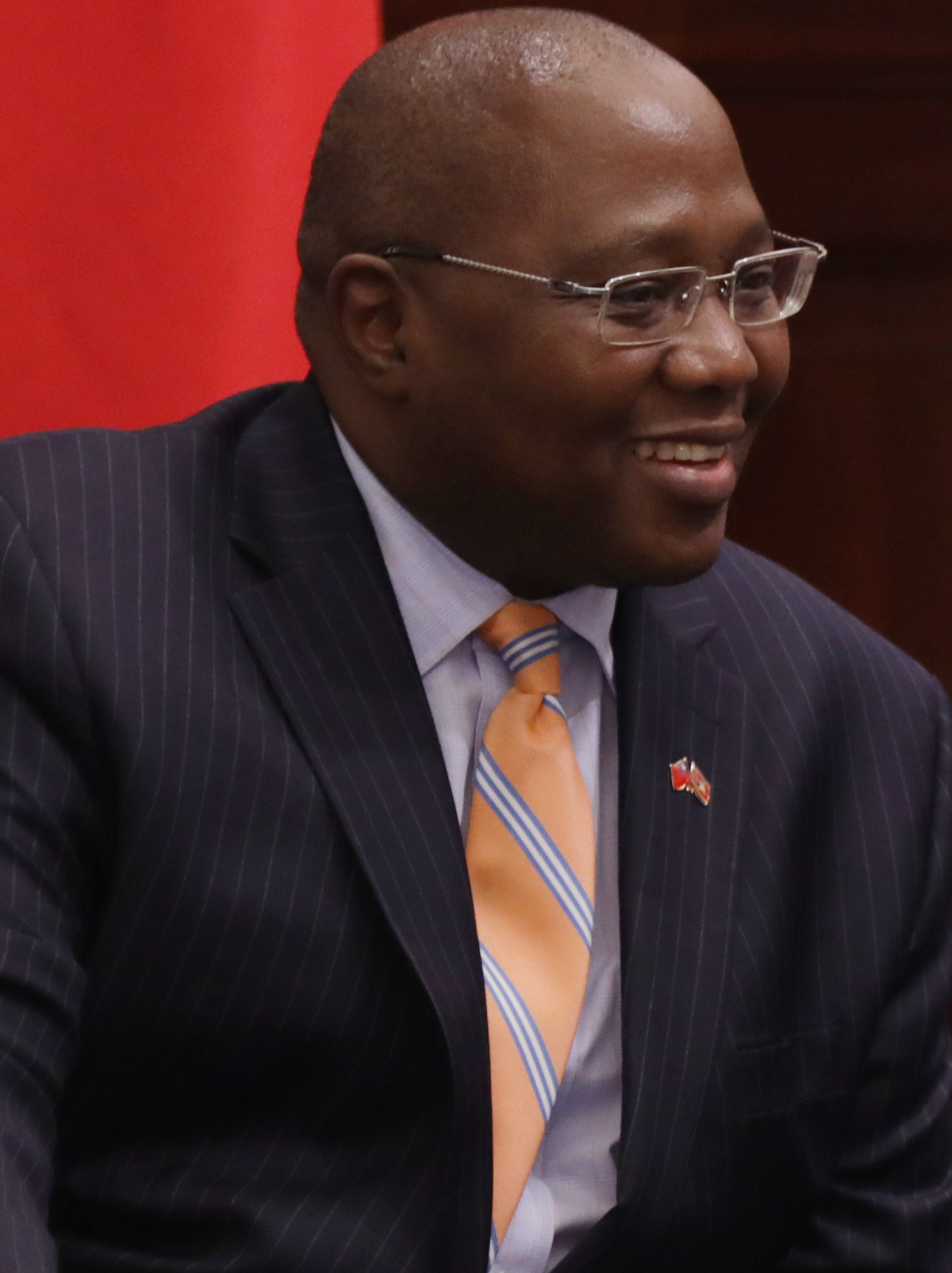
- Dlamini in 2019

10th Prime Minister of Eswatini
- In office 27 October 2018 – 13 December 2020
- Monarch: Mswati III
- Preceded by: Vincent Mhlanga (acting)
- Succeeded by: Themba Masuku (acting)

Personal details
- Born: 15 March 1968 Mbekelweni, Manzini Region, Protectorate of Swaziland
- Died: 13 December 2020 (aged 52) Milpark Hospital, Parktown, Johannesburg, South Africa
- Cause of death: COVID‑19
- Party: Independent
- Spouse: Portia Thwala-Dlamini
- Education: University of Eswatini; Hampton University

Prince Ambrose Mandvulo Dlamini (15 March 1968 – 13 December 2020) was a Swazi business executive who served as the tenth prime minister of Eswatini from 2018 until his death in 2020.

Born in Eswatini's Manzini Region, Dlamini completed his degree at the University of Swaziland and an MBA at Hampton University, going on to work in the banking and telecommunications sectors. His career of more than 18 years in these sectors included positions as managing director of Nedbank and as CEO of MTN Eswatini.

Following the death of Prime Minister Barnabas Sibusiso Dlamini in 2018, Dlamini was selected by King Mswati III to succeed him. He was the youngest prime minister in the country's history, and had no prior government experience. His work in government included cutting of nonessential expenses and making plans to improve the country's economy and ease of doing business ranking. He was also the head of the country's AIDS council.

== Biography ==
Dlamini was born on 5 March 1968 in Mbekelweni in Eswatini's Manzini Region. His great-grandfather, Prince Malunge, was an uncle to King Sobhuza II. Dlamini was married to Portia Thwala-Dlamini, and they had three children. He graduated from what was then the University of Swaziland and obtained an MBA at Hampton University.

Dlamini worked in the banking sector for more than 18 years, including as managing director of Nedbank from 2003 to 2010. From 2010 to 2018 he was the CEO of the telecommunications company MTN Eswatini, part of the South African MTN Group. In 2017, he approved the company's sponsorship of the MTN SWAMA Awards, a ceremony held by the Eswatini Arts and Music Association (SWAMA).

== Prime Minister of Eswatini ==
On 27 October 2018, King Mswati III announced in a gathering at the royal kraal at Lobamba that Dlamini would be the country's next prime minister after the 2018 elections; he would succeed Barnabas Sibusiso Dlamini, who died the previous month. At the time, Dlamini had no prior experience in government. He was the youngest head of government in Eswatini's history. The U.S. ambassador Lisa J. Peterson called Dlamini's appointment unconstitutional, as he was not a member of the House of Assembly at the time.

As the new prime minister, Dlamini announced that he would work on an "economic recovery" plan for the country. In preparation, he cut nonessential government expenses by reusing his predecessor's official vehicle, banning first class air travel for politicians and government employees, and restricting official international travel. The following year, he had to defend the government's decision to suspend cost of living adjustments for public sector employees. In 2020, he published opinion pieces in Business Day and the Financial Mail which outlined plans to develop the economy by improving the country's ease of doing business ranking and supporting economic diversification.

Dlamini was the head of the National AIDS Council and Eswatini's Country Coordinating Mechanism for The Global Fund to Fight AIDS, Tuberculosis and Malaria.

== Death ==
Dlamini had diabetes, and tested positive for COVID-19 during the COVID-19 pandemic in Eswatini on 15 November 2020. He was hospitalized eight days later after developing mild symptoms. He was transferred to a hospital in South Africa in early December, when Deputy Prime Minister Themba Masuku said he was in stable condition and responding to treatment. He died there on 13 December at the age of 52, from complications of the disease. He was the first national leader to die in office of COVID-19.

According to the Constitution of Eswatini, Masuku became acting prime minister for a maximum period of three months. Masuku ultimately served until July 2021, nearly seven months after Dlamini's death, when King Mswati replaced him with Cleopas Dlamini.

Political offices
Preceded by Vincent Mhlanga; Acting	Prime Minister of Eswatini; 2018–2020	Succeeded by Themba N. Masuku; Acting
