= Neal Rijkenberg =

Minister of Finance of Eswatini

The Honourable Neal Rijkenberg MP

Minister of Finance
- Incumbent
- Assumed office November 2018
- Monarch: Mswati III
- Prime Minister: Russell Dlamini
- Preceded by: Martin Dlamini

Member of Parliament
- Incumbent
- Assumed office November 2018
- Appointed by: Mswati III

Personal details
- Born: 1972 (age 53–54) Madulini, Shiselweni Region, Swaziland
- Party: Independent

Neal Rijkenberg is the minister of finance of Eswatini since November 2018.

Rijkenberg's family moved from South Africa to Swaziland in 1970. He was born in Swaziland in 1972. He previously was CEO of timber producer Montigny Group from 1997. He co-founded Bulembu Ministries Eswatini. He was also a director in Bulembu Ministries from 2005 to 2018. A self-described proponent of a free-market economy, he supports slashing labour and competition regulations. In February 2020, he cut the country's corporate tax rate from 27.5% to 12.5%.
