= COVID-19 pandemic in Eswatini =

- Disease: COVID-19
- Pathogen: SARS-CoV-2
- Location: Eswatini
- Arrival date: 14 March 2020 (6 years, 7 months and 2 weeks)
- Confirmed cases: 75,356 (updated 18 September 2026)
- Deaths: 1,427 (updated 18 September 2026)

The COVID-19 pandemic in Eswatini was a part of the worldwide pandemic of coronavirus disease 2019 (COVID-19) caused by severe acute respiratory syndrome coronavirus 2 (SARS-CoV-2). The COVID-19 pandemic was confirmed to have reached Eswatini in March 2020.

== Background ==
On 12 January 2020, the World Health Organization (WHO) confirmed that a novel coronavirus was the cause of a respiratory illness in a cluster of people in Wuhan City, Hubei Province, China, which was reported to the WHO on 31 December 2019.

The case fatality ratio for COVID-19 has been much lower than SARS of 2003, but the transmission has been significantly greater, with a significant total death toll. Model-based simulations for Eswatini suggest that the 95% confidence interval for the time-varying reproduction number R_{t} was lower than 1.0 from August to October 2020.

== Timeline ==
=== March 2020 ===
- On 14 March, the country's first case of COVID-19 was confirmed. A 33-year-old woman, who returned from the United States at the end of February and then travelled to Lesotho before returning home to Eswatini, entered isolation. Two suspected cases were identified by 11 March 2020, the first a woman returning from Denmark (or possibly Germany), and the other a woman who had hosted visitors from Germany.
- On 24 March, the ministry of health announced a fifth confirmed case. A 52-year-old male who had traveled to the United States earlier in the same month had tested positive.
- During March, nine persons tested positive. At the end of the month all nine cases were still active.

=== April to June 2020 ===
- On 16 April, the country recorded its first COVID-19-related death, a 59-year-old man with diabetes as an underlying condition. This month, 91 persons tested positive, bringing the total number of confirmed cases since the start of the outbreak to 100. At the end of April, 87 cases were active.
- During the month 185 persons tested positive, bringing the total number of confirmed cases since the start of the outbreak to 285. The death toll rose to 2. By the end of May, 94 cases were active (8% more than at the end of April).
- On 23 June, the government announced it would ban alcohol as of 1 July in an attempt to contain the spread after a rapid increase in new cases over the previous two weeks.
- During June, 527 persons tested positive, bringing the total number of confirmed cases to 812. The death toll rose to 11. By the end of June, 393 cases were active (318% more than at the end of May).

=== July to September 2020 ===
- There were 1836 new cases in July, bringing the total number of confirmed cases to 2648. The death toll rose to 40. By the end of July, 1215 patients had recovered while 1393 cases were active (254% more than at the end of June).
- There were 1929 new cases in August, raising the total number of cases to 4577. The death toll rose to 91. There were 957 active cases at the end of the month, representing a decrease of 31% since the end of July.
- There were 885 new cases in September, bringing the total number of confirmed cases to 5462. The death toll rose to 108. The number of recovered patients increased to 4859, leaving 495 active cases at the end of the month.

=== October to December 2020 ===
- There were 455 new cases in October, bringing the total number of confirmed cases to 5917. The death toll rose to 117. The number of recovered patients increased to 5646, leaving 154 active cases at the end of the month.
- On 14 December, Eswatini's prime minister Ambrose Dlamini became the first head of government in the world to die in office from COVID-19. There were 2939 new cases in December, raising the total number of confirmed cases to 9358. The death toll rose to 205. The number of recovered patients increased to 7073, leaving 2080 active cases at the end of the month.

=== January to March 2021 ===
- In early January, the health ministry announced that it had set aside 200 million emalangeni to roll out vaccines to its 1.3 million population, approximately E200 per person.
- Two Cabinet ministers, Christian Ntshangase and Makhosi Vilakati, died from COVID-19 on 16 January and 23 January respectively.
- There were 6353 new cases in January, raising the total number of confirmed cases to 15711. The death toll rose to 565. The number of recovered patients increased to 10478, leaving 4668 active cases at the end of the month.
- On February 19, King Mswati III revealed that he had tested positive for COVID-19 "for a couple days" in the first weeks of January, and had since recovered quickly due to an antiviral drug provided by the Republic of China. This was confirmed by Taiwanese health minister Chen Shih-chung. However, neither of them revealed which drug had been used.
- There were 1303 new cases in February, raising the total number of confirmed cases to 17014. The death toll rose to 652. The number of recovered patients increased to 14676, leaving 1686 active cases at the end of the month.
- Targeted vaccination began on 19 March, initially with 32,000 doses of AstraZeneca's Covishield vaccine.
- There were 323 new cases in March, raising the total number of confirmed cases to 17337. The death toll rose to 667. The number of recovered patients increased to 16528, leaving 142 active cases at the end of the month.

=== April to June 2021 ===
- There were 1121 new cases in April, raising the total number of confirmed cases to 18458. The death toll rose to 671. The number of recovered patients increased to 17743, leaving 44 active cases at the end of the month.
- There were 133 new cases in May, taking the total number of confirmed cases to 18591. The death toll rose to 673. The number of recovered patients increased to 17870, leaving 48 active cases at the end of the month.
- There were 493 new cases in June, taking the total number of confirmed cases to 19084. The death toll rose to 678. The number of recovered patients increased to 18107, leaving 299 active cases at the end of the month.

=== July to September 2021 ===
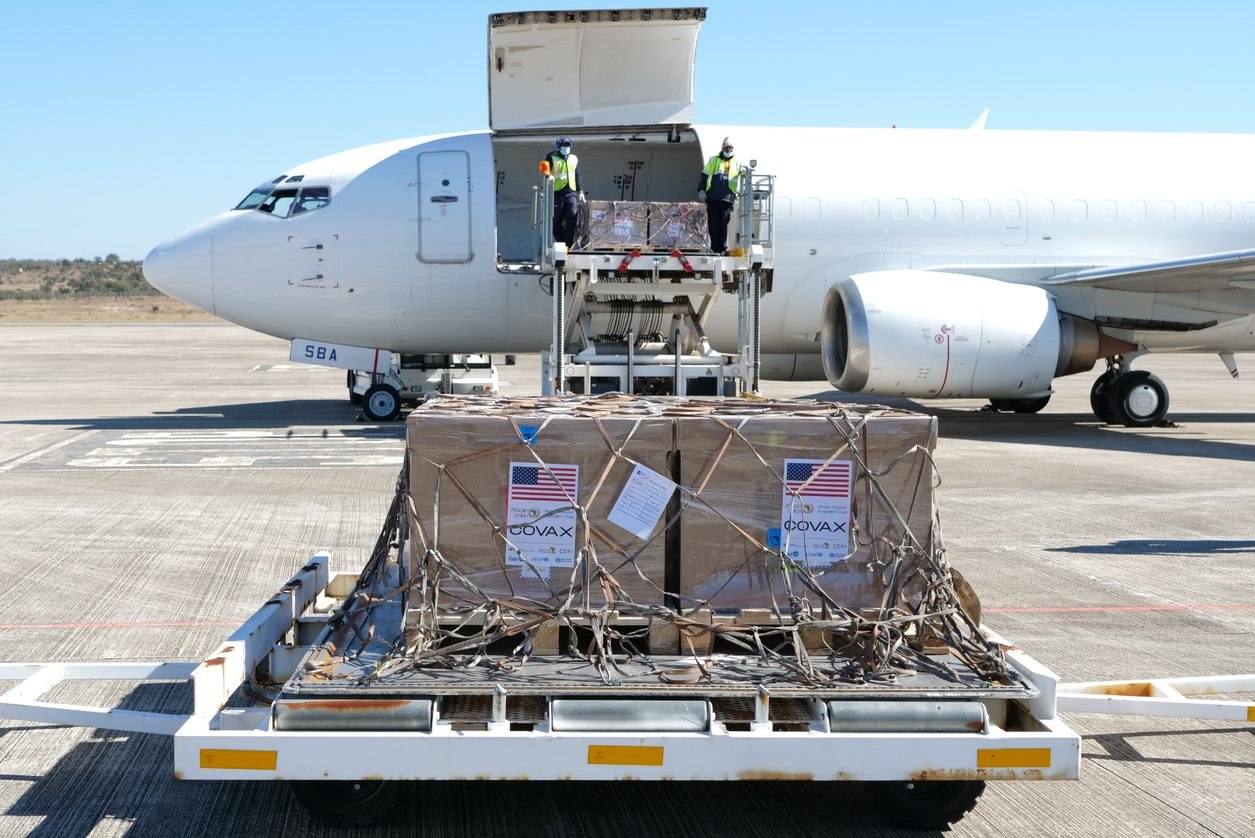
The US delivers Janssen COVID-19 vaccines to Eswatini as part of the COVAX program in 2021

- There were 6895 new cases in July, raising the total number of confirmed cases to 25979. The death toll rose to 787. The number of recovered patients increased to 20918, leaving 4274 active cases at the end of the month. The number of fully vaccinated persons stood at 27341.
- There were 17392 new cases in August, raising the total number of confirmed cases to 43371. The death toll rose to 1101. 154,203 persons had been fully vaccinated by 30 August.
- There were 2553 new cases in September, bringing the total number of confirmed cases to 45924. The death toll rose to 1220. The number of recovered patients increased to 44086, leaving 618 active cases at the end of the month. 210,432 persons had been fully vaccinated by 30 September.

=== October to December 2021 ===
- There were 497 new cases in October, bringing the total number of confirmed cases to 46421. The death toll rose to 1242. The number of recovered patients increased to 45129, leaving 50 active cases at the end of the month.
- There were 235 new cases in November, bringing the total number of confirmed cases to 46656. The death toll rose to 1248. The number of recovered patients increased to 45242, leaving 166 active cases at the end of the month.
- There were 19453 new cases in December, raising the total number of confirmed cases to 66109. The death toll rose to 1303. The number of recovered patients increased to 58767, leaving 6039 active cases at the end of the month. Modelling by WHO's Regional Office for Africa suggests that due to under-reporting, the true number of infections by the end of 2021 was around 0.6 million while the true number of COVID-19 deaths was around 1334.

=== January to March 2022 ===
- There were 2233 new cases in January, raising the total number of confirmed cases to 68342. The death toll rose to 1375. The number of recovered patients increased to 66721, leaving 246 active cases at the end of the month.
- There were 788 new cases in February, bringing the total number of confirmed cases to 69130. The death toll rose to 1390. The number of recovered patients increased to 67643, leaving 97 active cases at the end of the month.
- There were 641 new cases in March, bringing the total number of confirmed cases to 69771. The death toll rose to 1394. The number of recovered patients increased to 68279, leaving 98 active cases at the end of the month.

=== April to June 2022 ===
- There were 886 new cases in April, bringing the total number of confirmed cases to 70657. The death toll rose to 1397. The number of recovered patients increased to 68906, leaving 354 active cases at the end of the month.
- There were 1740 new cases in May, bringing the total number of confirmed cases to 72397. The death toll rose to 1407. The number of recovered patients increased to 70740, leaving 250 active cases at the end of the month.
- There were 712 new cases in June, bringing the total number of confirmed cases to 73109. The death toll rose to 1416. The number of recovered patients increased to 71636, leaving 57 active cases at the end of the month.

=== July to September 2022 ===
- There were 171 new cases in July, bringing the total number of confirmed cases to 73280. The death toll rose to 1417. The number of recovered patients increased to 71830, leaving 33 active cases at the end of the month.
- There were 88 new cases in August, bringing the total number of confirmed cases to 73368. The death toll rose to 1422. The number of recovered patients increased to 71923, leaving 23 active cases at the end of the month.
- There were 22 new cases in September, bringing the total number of confirmed cases to 73390. The death toll remained unchanged.

=== October to December 2022 ===
- There were 168 new cases in October, bringing the total number of confirmed cases to 73558. The death toll remained unchanged.
- There were 350 new cases in November, bringing the total number of confirmed cases to 73908. The death toll remained unchanged.
- There were 126 new cases in December, bringing the total number of confirmed cases to 74034. The death toll remained unchanged.

=== 2023 ===
- There were 1,157 confirmed cases in 2023, bringing the total number of cases to 75,191. The death toll rose to 1,427.

== Statistics ==
=== Confirmed new cases per day ===
View source data.

=== Confirmed deaths per day ===
View source data.

== See also ==
- COVID-19 pandemic in Africa
- COVID-19 pandemic by country and territory
- COVID-19 vaccination in Eswatini
