= Themba Masuku =

Eswatini politician (born 1950)

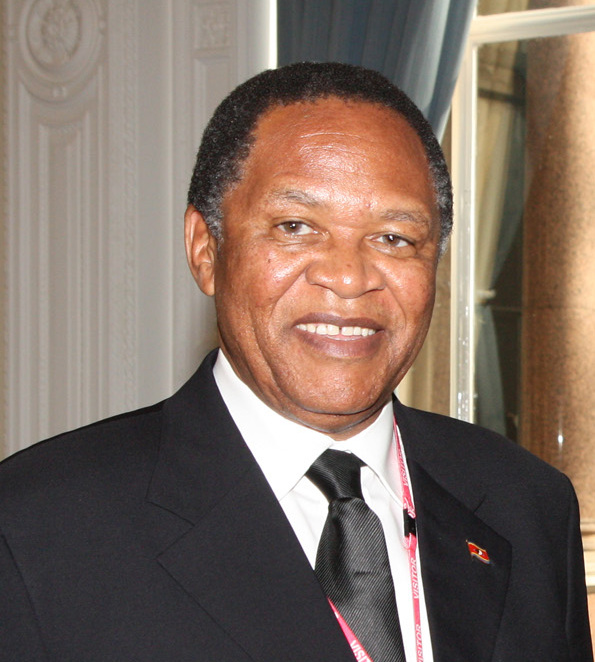

Acting Prime Minister of Eswatini
- In office 13 December 2020 – 19 July 2021
- Monarch: Mswati III
- Preceded by: Ambrose Mandvulo Dlamini
- Succeeded by: Cleopas Dlamini

Deputy Prime Minister of Eswatini
- In office 6 November 2018 – 13 November 2023
- Monarch: Mswati III
- Prime Minister: Ambrose Mandvulo Dlamini himself (acting); Cleopas Dlamini
- Preceded by: Paul Dlamini
- Succeeded by: Thuli Dladla
- In office 2008–2013
- Monarch: Mswati III
- Prime Minister: Barnabas Sibusiso Dlamini
- Succeeded by: Paul Dlamini

Minister for Finance
- In office November 1996 – November 1998
- Preceded by: Derek von Wissel
- Succeeded by: John Philip Carmichael

Minister for Economic Planning and Development
- In office 1993–1996

Minister for Agriculture and Cooperatives
- In office 1991–1993

Personal details
- Born: 7 July 1950 (age 75)
- Party: Independent

Themba Nhlanganiso Masuku (born 7 July 1950) is a Swazi politician who has served as Deputy Prime Minister of Eswatini since 2018 and as Acting Prime Minister from 13 December 2020 to 16 July 2021. Earlier, he served as Deputy Prime Minister from 2008 until 2013.

== Early life ==
Masuku was born on 7 July 1950. He received his Master of Science degree from the University of Missouri.

== Career ==
In the 1990s, he filled various posts in the government of Swaziland, including Minister for Agriculture and Cooperatives, Minister for Economic Planning and Development, and Minister of Finance from 1996 to 1998. He then worked with the Food and Agriculture Organization of the United Nations, as director of the liaison offices in Geneva and later New York. He was appointed Deputy Prime Minister in 2008 by King Mswati III and served in that position until 2013, when he became the regional administrator for the Shiselweni district.

Masuku returned to his position as Deputy Prime Minister when Prime Minister Ambrose Mandvulo Dlamini presented his cabinet in November 2018. He became acting prime minister after Dlamini's death on 13 December 2020. According to the Constitution of Eswatini, Themba Masuku was supposed to serve as Acting Prime Minister for a maximum period of three months. In June and July 2021, amidst police and army brutality, Masuku was criticized for his handling of the 2021 Eswatini Protests against the monarchy. In a sibaya on 16 July 2021, King Mswati replaced Masuku with Cleopas Dlamini as the new prime minister.
