= Swazi Nation Land =

Swazi Nation Land (SNL) is land in Eswatini which is under the rule of chiefs for settlement of Swazi people. It is vested in the King in trust of the nation. SNL communal land is typically used for pasture with livestock belonging to residents of a chiefdom freely roaming. Land for homesteads and small farms is allocated by chiefs, who also settle matters of land disputes.

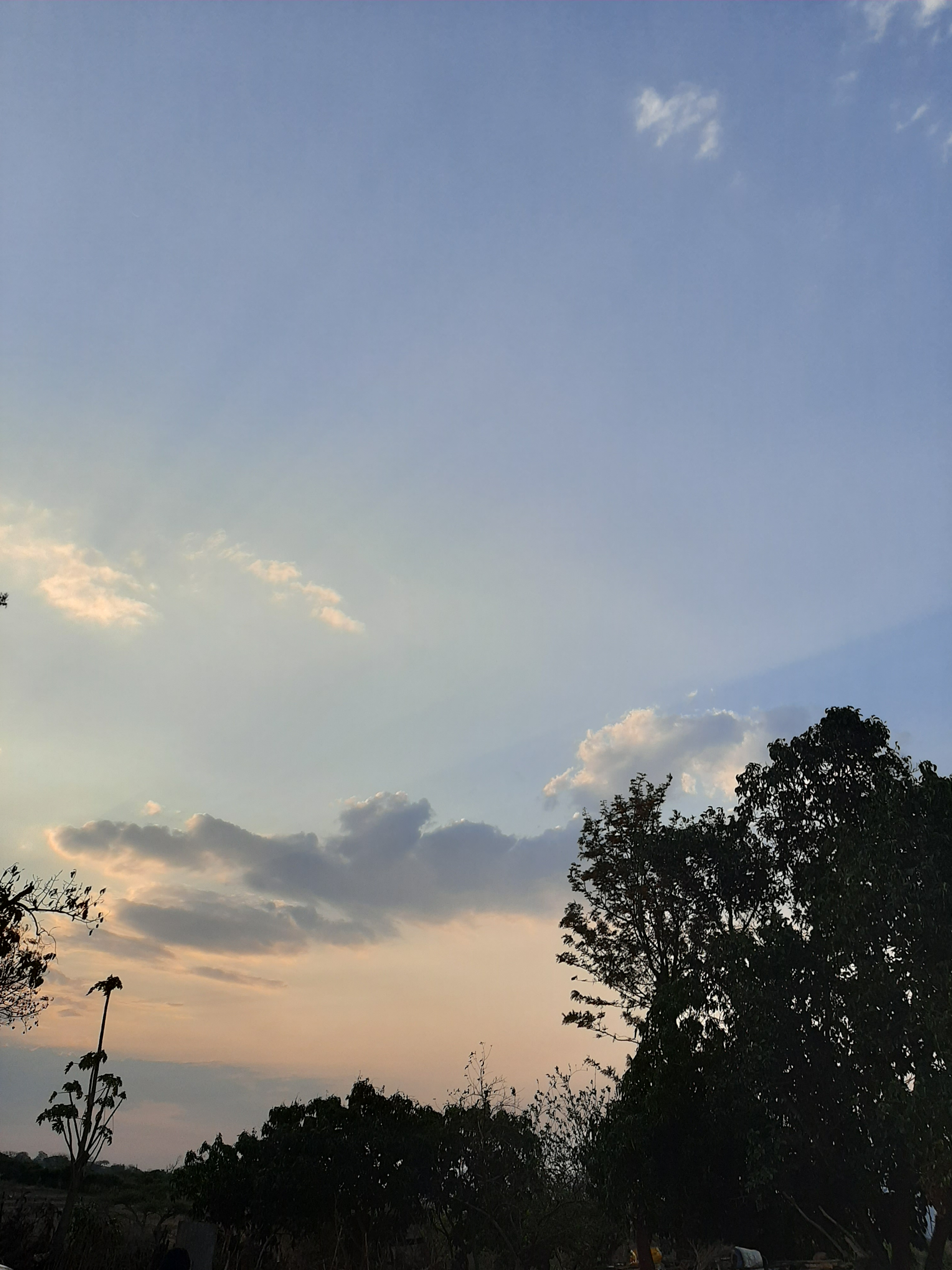
