= Economy of Eswatini =

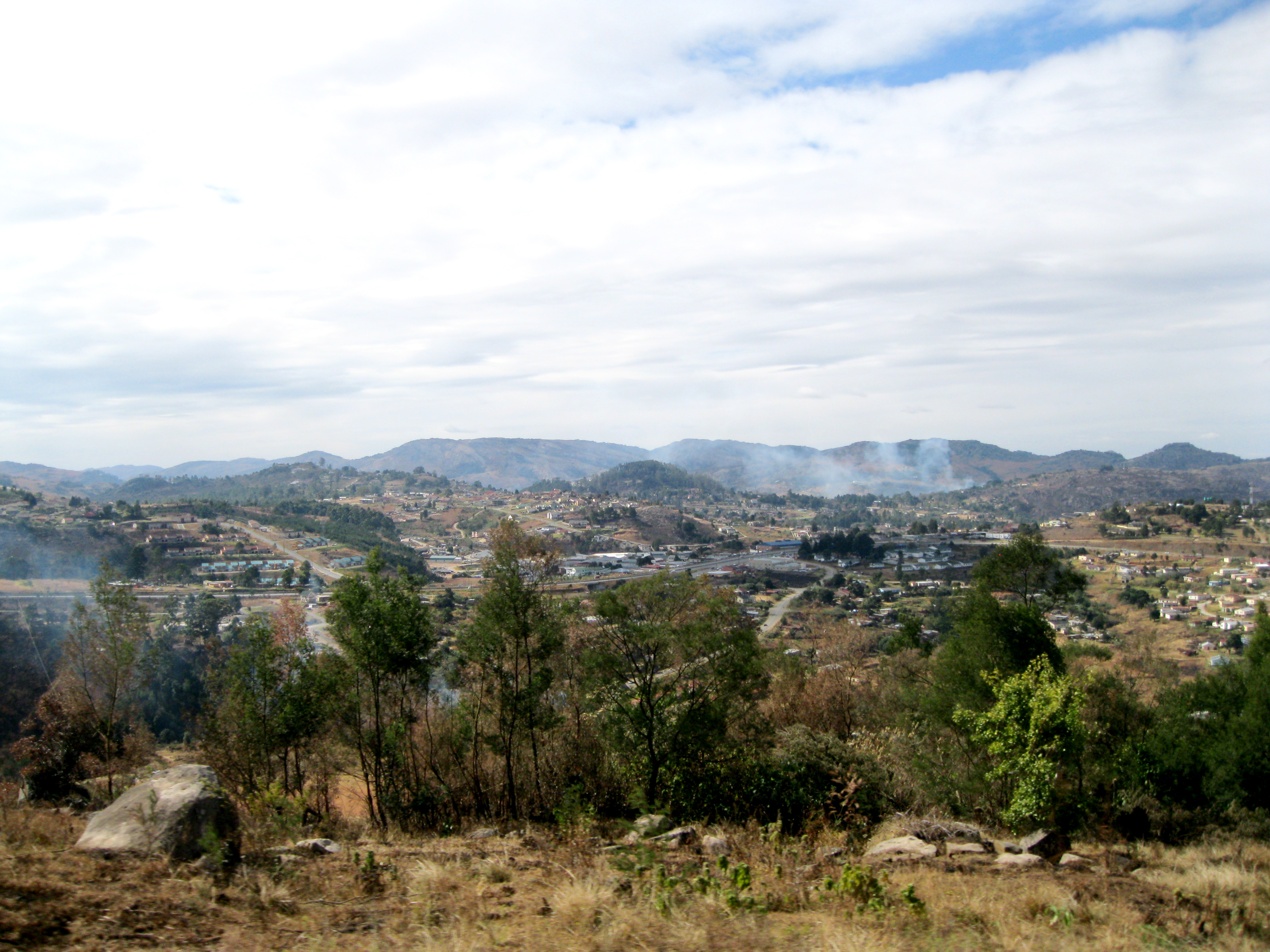
- Mbabane, Capital of Eswatini
- Currency: Swazi lilangeni (SZL), South African rand (ZAR)
- Fiscal year: 1 April - 31 March
- Trade organisations: AU, AfCFTA, WTO, SADC, SACU

Statistics
- GDP: ▲$5.79 billion (nominal; 2026); ▲$16.75 billion (PPP; 2026)
- GDP rank: 160th (nominal; 2025); 156th (PPP; 2025)
- GDP growth: ▲5.1% (2025); ▼4.9% (2026f)
- GDP per capita: ▲$4,610 (nominal; 2025); ▲$13,730 (PPP; 2025)
- GDP per capita rank: 120th (nominal; 2025); 113th (PPP; 2025)
- GDP by sector: agriculture: 8.77%, industry: 33.8%, services: 53.15% (2019 est.)
- Inflation (CPI): 6.1% (2011 est.)
- Human Development Index: 0.695
- Labour force: 457,900 (2007)
- Labour force by occupation: agriculture: 70%
- Unemployment: 40% (2006 est.)
- Youth unemployment: ▼54.3% (2025)
- Main industries: Coal mining, wood pulp, sugar, soft drink concentrates, textile and apparel

External
- Exports: $2.049 billion f.o.b. (2011 est.)
- Export goods: soft drink concentrates, sugar, wood pulp, cotton yarn, refrigerators, citrus and canned fruit
- Main export partners: South Africa 59.7%; EU 8.8%; US 8.8%; Mozambique 6.2%; (2004)
- Imports: $2.076 billion f.o.b. (2011 est.)
- Import goods: motor vehicles, machinery, transport equipment, foodstuffs, petroleum products, chemicals
- Main import partners: South Africa 95.6%; EU 0.9%; Japan 0.9%; Singapore 0.3%; (2004)

Public finance
- Government debt: $703.1 million (2011 est.)
- Revenue: $1.006 billion (2011)
- Spending: $1.488 billion (2011)
- Economic aid: recipient: $104 million (2001)
- All values, unless otherwise stated, are in US dollars.

Eswatini has a diversified developing economy. Agriculture, forestry and mining account for about 13 percent of Eswatini's GDP, whereas manufacturing (textiles and sugar-related processing) represent 37 percent of GDP. Services, with government services in the lead, constitute the other 50 percent of GDP.

== Agriculture ==
Title Deed lands, where the bulk of high-value crops are grown (sugar, forestry, and citrus) are characterized by high levels of investment and irrigation, and high productivity. Nevertheless, the majority of the population – about 75 percent—is employed in subsistence agriculture on Swazi Nation Land, which, in contrast, suffers from low productivity and investment. This dual nature of the Swazi economy, with high productivity in textile manufacturing and in the industrialized agricultural title deed lands on the one hand, and declining productivity subsistence agriculture on Swazi Nation Land on the other, may well explain the country's overall low growth, high inequality and unemployment.

== Economic growth ==
Economic growth in Eswatini has lagged behind that of its neighbors. Real GDP growth since 2001 has averaged 2.8 percent, nearly 2 percentage points lower than growth in other Southern African Customs Union (SACU) member countries. Low agricultural productivity in the Swazi nation lands, repeated droughts, the effect of HIV/AIDS, and an overly large and inefficient government sector are likely contributing factors. Eswatini's public finances deteriorated in the late 1990s following sizeable surpluses a decade earlier. A combination of declining revenues and increased spending led to significant budget deficits. The considerable spending has not led to more economic growth and has not benefitted the poor to the same extent as regional comparators, although the poverty headcount has shifted slightly during the first decade of the 2000s (SHIES 2010). Much of the increased spending has gone to current expenditures related to wages, transfers, and subsidies. The wage bill today constitutes over 15 percent of GDP and 55 percent of total public spending; these are some of the highest levels on the African continent. The recent rapid growth in SACU revenues has, however, reversed the fiscal situation, and a sizeable surplus was recorded in 2006/07 and 2012/13. SACU revenues today account for over 50 percent of total government revenues. On the positive side, the external debt burden has declined markedly over the last 20 years, and domestic debt is almost negligible; external debt as a percent of GDP was less than 20 percent in 2006.

== Trade partners ==
The Swazi economy is very closely linked to the economy of South Africa, from which it receives over 90 percent of its imports and to which it sends about 70 percent of its exports. Eswatini has great resources making a good trading partner. Eswatini's other key trading partners are the United States and the EU, from whom the country has received trade preferences for apparel exports (under the African Growth and Opportunity Act – AGOA – to the US) and for sugar (to the EU). Under these agreements, both apparel and sugar exports did well, with rapid growth and a strong inflow of foreign direct investment. Textile exports grew by over 200 percent between 2000 and 2005 and sugar exports increasing by more than 50 percent over the same period. The continued vibrancy of the export sector is threatened by the removal of trade preferences for textiles, the accession to similar preferences for East Asian countries, and the phasing out of preferential prices for sugar to the EU market. Eswatini will thus have to face the challenge of remaining competitive in a changing global environment. A crucial factor in addressing this challenge is the investment climate. The recently concluded Investment Climate Assessment provides some positive findings in this regard, namely that Eswatini firms are among the most productive in Sub-Saharan Africa, although they are less productive than firms in the most productive middle-income countries in other regions. They compare more favorably with firms from lower middle income countries, but are hampered by inadequate governance arrangements and infrastructure.

Eswatini, Lesotho, Botswana, Namibia, and the Republic of South Africa form the Southern African Customs Union (SACU), where import duties apply uniformly to member countries. Eswatini, Lesotho, Namibia, and South Africa also are members of the Common Monetary Area (CMA) in which repatriation and unrestricted funds are permitted. Eswatini issues its own currency, the Swazi lilangeni (plural: emalangeni), which is at par with the South African rand.

== Infrastructure ==
Eswatini enjoys well-developed road links with South Africa. Eswatini Railways operates its railroads that run east to west and north to south. The older east–west link, called the Goba line, makes it possible to export bulk goods from Eswatini through the Port of Maputo in Mozambique. Until recently, most of Eswatini's imports were shipped through this port. Conflict in Mozambique in the 1980s diverted many Swazi exports to ports in South Africa. A north–south rail link, completed in 1986, provides a connection between the Eastern Transvaal (now Mpumalanga) rail network and the South African ports of Richards Bay and Durban. From the mid-1980s foreign investment in the manufacturing sector boosted economic growth rates significantly. Since mid-1985, the depreciated value of the currency has increased the competitiveness of Swazi exports and moderated the growth of imports, generating trade surpluses. During the 1990s, the country often ran small trade deficits.

== Sugar industry ==
Eswatini is the fourth largest producer of sugar in Africa and is 25th in production in the world. This demonstrates the immense focus of the industry in order to continue to grow their economy. Eswatini's GDP was $8.621 billion (US dollars) in 2014 based on purchasing power parity and of that 7.2% of that is from the agriculture sector and of that sector, sugarcane and sugar products have the largest impact on GDP. According to the World CIA Factbook, wood pulp and sugarcane were the largest exports of Eswatini until the wood pulp producer closed in January 2010. This left the sugarcane industry as the sole main export. The largest company that produces sugar in Eswatini is the Royal Eswatini Sugar Corporation (RES Corporation) and it produces a little under two-thirds of total sugar in the country and produces over 3,000 jobs for the people of Eswatini. The RES Corporation is composed of two main sugar mill producers, Mhlume and Simunye, which produce a combined 430,000 tons of cane per season. The second largest sugarcane company is Ubombo Sugar Limited which has grown from producing 5,600 tons in 1958 to approximately 230,000 tons of sugar annually. The third largest sugarcane producer is the Tambankulu Estate (largest independent sugar estate) and it produces 62,000 tons of sugar annually on 3,816 hectares of land.

The largest export partners of Eswatini and the larger Southern African Development Community (SADC) is the European Union. The SADC is a group of many southern African countries who have banded together in order to try to improve their individual socioeconomic status. In 2014-2015 the sugar production of Eswatini was 680,881 metric tons and of this about 355,000 metric tons of sugar was shipped to the European Union, larger than any other export partner. Another trade partner for Eswatini was the United States where they shipped 34,000 metric tons of sugar in the 2014-2015 year under the Tariff Rate Quota. These numbers are up from past years and continue to rise. The expected output based on the 2015-2016 post forecast predictions are that Eswatini will produce 705,000 metric tons, a new record for the country that can be attributed to an increase in land being available for sugar cultivation. Of this predicted figure about 390,000 metric tons will go to the European Union as part of a new Economic Partnership Agreement (EPA). This new agreement between the EU and SADC means that members like Eswatini can sell their sugar on a duty-free and quota-free basis.

The quotas that the EU and the United States fill is similar to the Sugar Protocol which began in 1975. The goal of the Sugar Protocol was for the EU to purchase and import specific quantities from countries in Africa, the Caribbean and the Pacific. These prices and quantities guaranteed production and were well above the world price, which translated into substantial profits for these mostly impoverished countries. This agreement reached an end in 2009 because the EU could no longer support the pre-determined demands. The Sugar Protocol came to an immediate end and was replaced with separate Economic Partnerships with the varying countries and regions. Even though the demands will be just as high as under the Sugar Protocol, the prices will drop significantly. In the case of Eswatini, they have received good reassurance that their product will still be bought by the EU.

== Mining ==
Currently, Eswatini's mineral sector is governed under a policy drawn up prior to Eswatini's independence. In response to the sector's recent decline, a new mining policy is being drafted by consultants, paid for by a grant from China, and legislation to facilitate small-scale mining has also been proposed.

The country's main source of foreign exchange is the Bulembu asbestos mine, however production has hit a steep decline. Diamond, iron ore and gold have also been found in the past, however a lack of investment and development policy has seen the region's potential falter.

Although fewer than 1,000 Swazis are directly employed in the mining sector, many workers from Eswatini processed timber from the country's extensive pine populations for mines in South Africa, and around 10,000–15,000 Swazis were employed in South African mines. Their contributions to Eswatini's economy through wage repatriation have been diminished, though, by the collapse of the international gold market and layoffs in South Africa.

== Macroeconomic trends ==
The following table shows the main economic indicators in 1980-2026. Inflation below 5% is in green.

Year	GDP			GDP growth (real)	Inflation	Government debt (% of GDP)
Year	Total (bil. US$ PPP)	Per capita (US$ PPP)	Total (bil. US$ nominal)	GDP growth (real)	Inflation	Government debt (% of GDP)
1980	0.9	1594	0.7	▼ -3.8	▲18.2	n/a
1985	▲1.3	▲1958	▼0.5	▲1.9	▲20.5	n/a
1990	▲2.5	▲3120	▲1.2	▲9.9	▲13.1	n/a
1995	▲3.3	▲3680	▲1.9	▲4.8	▲12.3	▲12.5
2000	▲4.1	▲4288	▼1.7	▲1.8	▲9.9	▲18.2
2005	▲5.6	▲5586	▲3.1	▲6.0	▲4.9	▼13.6
2006	▲6.1	▲6073	▲3.2	▲6.0	▲5.2	▲14.7
2007	▲6.5	▲6476	▲3.4	▲4.4	▲8.1	▲16.1
2008	▲6.7	▲6610	▼3.2	▲0.8	▲12.7	▼14.6
2009	▲6.9	▲6712	▲3.5	▲1.6	▲7.4	▼10.6
2010	▲7.2	▲7010	▲4.3	▲3.8	▲4.5	▲14.2
2011	▲7.5	▲7275	▲4.7	▲2.2	▲6.1	▲14.6
2012	▲8.1	▲7769	4.7	▲5.4	▲8.9	▲14.8
2013	▲8.5	▲8162	▼4.5	▲3.9	▲5.6	▲15.2
2014	▲8.8	▲8427	▼4.3	▲2.1	▲5.7	▼14.1
2015	▲9.1	▲8601	▼3.9	▲1.7	▲5.0	▲16.0
2016	▲9.4	▲8887	▼3.7	▲2.9	▲7.8	▲20.1
2017	▲9.9	▲9295	▲4.5	▲3.5	▲6.2	▲21.7
2018	▲10.0	▼9241	▲4.6	▲0.1	▲4.8	▲26.5
2019	▲10.9	▲10013	4.6	▲6.4	▲2.6	▲30.5
2020	▲11.1	▲10101	▼4.1	▼ -3.0	▲3.9	▲37.7
2021	▲12.1	▲10825	▲4.8	▲4.2	▲3.7	▼37.3
2022	▲13.0	▲11514	▼4.7	▲0.4	▲4.8	▲39.5
2023	▲13.9	▲12229	▼4.6	▲3.5	▲4.9	▼39.4
2024	▲14.7	▲12766	▲4.9	▲3.0	▲4.0	▲40.1
2025	▲15.6	▲13456	▲5.2	▲3.6	▲3.1	▲44.9
2026	▲16.7	▲14245	▲5.8	▲4.0	▲3.5	▲50.0

== See also ==
- Economy of Africa
- Eswatini
- United Nations Economic Commission for Africa
