= Cabinet of Eswatini =

Decision-making body of the Eswatini government

The Cabinet of Eswatini is the most senior level of the executive branch of the Government of Eswatini. It is composed of the Prime Minister, the Deputy Prime Minister and the Ministers. Ministers are appointed by the king based on the recommendations of the prime minister. All cabinet members must be members of parliament.

== Composition ==
On 13 November 2023, Prime Minister Russell Dlamini announced his cabinet.

| Portfolio | Minister |
|---|---|
| Prime Minister of Eswatini | Russell Dlamini |
| Deputy Prime Minister of Eswatini | Thuli Dladla |
| Finance | Neal Rijkenberg |
| Commerce, Industry & Trade | Manqoba Khumalo |
| Justice and Constitutional Affairs | Prince Simelane |
| Information Communication & Technology | Savannah Maziya |
| Natural Resources & Energy | Prince Lonkhokhela |
| Home Affairs | Princess Lindiwe |
| Public Works & Transport | Ndlaluhlaza Ndwandwe |
| Housing & Urban Development | Apollo Maphalala |
| Foreign Affairs & International Cooperation | Pholile Shakantu |
| Health | Mduduzi Matsebula |
| Sports, Culture & Youth Affairs | Bongani Ndzima |
| Tourism and Environmental Affairs | Jane Mkhonta-Simelane |
| Tinkhundla Administration & Development | Sikhumbuzo Dlamini |
| Education and Training | Owen Nxumalo |
| Labour & Social Security | Phila Buthelezi |
| Public Service | Mabulala Maseko |
| Economic Planning and Development | Tambo Gina |
| Agriculture | Mandla Chauke |

== See also ==
- King of Eswatini
- List of prime ministers of Eswatini
- Politics of Eswatini
- Royals of Eswatini
