= Swazi lilangeni =

Currency of Eswatini

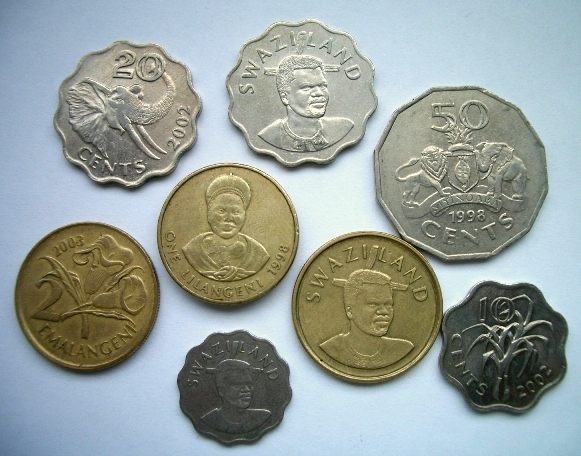
- Swazi coins

ISO 4217
- Code: SZL (numeric: 748)
- Subunit: 0.01

Unit
- Plural: emalangeni
- Symbol: L or E (pl.)

Denominations
- Subunit
- 1/100: cent
- Banknotes: E10, E20, E50, E100, E200
- Coins: 10, 20, 50 cents, L1, E2, E5

Demographics
- Date of introduction: 1974
- User(s): Eswatini (alongside South African rand)

Issuance
- Central bank: Central Bank of Eswatini
- Website: www.centralbank.org.sz

Valuation
- Inflation: 4.9%
- Source: Central Bank of Swaziland, March 2010
- Pegged with: South African rand at par

The lilangeni (plural: emalangeni, ISO 4217 code: SZL) is the currency of Eswatini and is subdivided into 100 cents. It is issued by the Central Bank of Eswatini (in swazi Umntsholi Wemaswati) and is authorised by the king and his family. The South African rand is also accepted in Eswatini. Similar to the Lesotho loti, there are singular and plural abbreviations, namely L and E, so where one might have an amount L1, it would be E2, E3, or E4.

== History ==
It was introduced in 1974 at par with the South African rand through the Common Monetary Area, to which it remains tied at a one-to-one exchange rate.

The currency's name derives from emaLangeni, a term used to describe the ancestors of the Swazi people who migrated to Swaziland in the 18th–19th centuries.

== Coins ==
The currency's name derives from emaLangeni ("people from the Sun"), a term used to describe the ancestors of the Swazi people who migrated to Swaziland in the 18th–19th centuries.

In 1974, coins for 1, 2, 5, 10, 20 and 50 cents and 1 lilangeni were introduced, with the 1 and 2 cents struck in bronze and the others struck in cupro-nickel. Except for the 1 lilangeni, the coins were not round, with the 1 and 50 cents dodecagonal, the 2 cents square with rounded corners and the 5, 10 and 20 cents scalloped.

The 2 cents was last struck in 1982, whilst, in 1986, round, copper-plated steel 1 cent and nickel-brass 1 lilangeni coins were introduced. These were followed, in 1992, by nickel-plated-steel 5 and 10 cents and nickel-brass-plated-steel 1 lilangeni coins. In 1995, 2 and 5 emalangeni coins were introduced.

From 2009 to 2011 new coins were introduced in copper-plated steel (5c and 10c), nickel-plated steel (20c, and a 50c piece which was never released into circulation) and brass-plated steel (L1). These were similar sizes to the existing coins but lighter due to the changed metal composition.

In February 2016, a new series of coins dated 2015 was introduced and all previous coins were recalled and demonetised. The new coins have similar designs to the previous coins, but with slightly different sizes and weights. The 10c-50c are in nickel-plated steel and the L1-E5 are in aluminium-bronze. 1c-5c coins are no longer in use.

The nickel-brass L1 coin dated 1986 and brass coins dated 1995-2009 had the same dimensions and composition as the British £1 coins introduced in 1983, and thus have sometimes been used fraudulently in British vending machines with the value of L1 decreasing from £0.36 in 1986 to £0.05 in 2015, when those L1 coins were demonetised.

== Banknotes ==
E10 banknote

On 6 September 1974, the Monetary Authority of Swaziland introduced notes in denominations of 1 lilangeni, 2, 5 and 10 emalangeni, with 20 emalangeni notes following in 1978. In 1981, the Central Bank of Swaziland took over paper money production, first issuing notes commemorating the Diamond Jubilee of King Sobhuza II. Between 1982 and 1985, it introduced non-commemorative notes for E2, E5, E10, and E20. The 50 emalangeni notes were introduced in 1990. The E2 and E5 notes were replaced by coins in 1995, whilst 100 and 200 emalangeni notes were introduced in 1996 and 1998, respectively, with the E200 notes commemorating the 30th anniversary of independence. On September 5, 2008, the Central Bank of Swaziland issued 100-, and 200-emalangeni notes to commemorate the 40th birthday of King Mswati III and the 40th anniversary of independence. On November 1, 2010, the Central Bank of Swaziland has issued a new series of banknotes with enhanced security features.

Banknotes of the Swazi lilangeni (06.09.10 issue)
Image	Value	Obverse	Reverse	Watermark
	10 emalangeni	King Mswati III	Princesses at the Ncwala (kingship ceremony)	King Mswati III and electrotype 10
	20 emalangeni	King Mswati III	Flower, corn, and pineapple; steer; refinery	King Mswati III and electrotype 20
	50 emalangeni	King Mswati III	Central Bank of Swaziland building	King Mswati III and electrotype 50
	100 emalangeni	King Mswati III	Elephant, rhinoceros, lion, flowers, and bird	King Mswati III and electrotype 100
	200 emalangeni	King Mswati III	Swazi straw huts; goats; warrior; rock formation	King Mswati III and electrotype 200

Current SZL exchange rates
From Google Finance:	AUD CAD CHF CNY EUR GBP HKD JPY USD ZAR
From Yahoo! Finance:	AUD CAD CHF CNY EUR GBP HKD JPY USD ZAR
From XE.com:	AUD CAD CHF CNY EUR GBP HKD JPY USD ZAR
From OANDA:	AUD CAD CHF CNY EUR GBP HKD JPY USD ZAR

== See also ==
- Economy of Eswatini

== Sources ==
- Krause, Chester L.; Clifford Mishler (1991). Standard Catalog of World Coins: 1801–1991 (18th ed.). Krause Publications. ISBN 0873411501.
- Pick, Albert (1994). Bruce, Colin R. II; Shafer, Neil (eds.). Standard Catalog of World Paper Money: General Issues (7th ed.). Krause Publications. ISBN 0-87341-207-9.

Preceded by: South African rand Ratio: at par	Currency of Eswatini; 1974 – Concurrent with: South African rand (legal tender until 1986, and circulated unofficially thereafter)	Succeeded by: Current
