= Black Madonna =

Artistic depiction of the Virgin Mary and Jesus

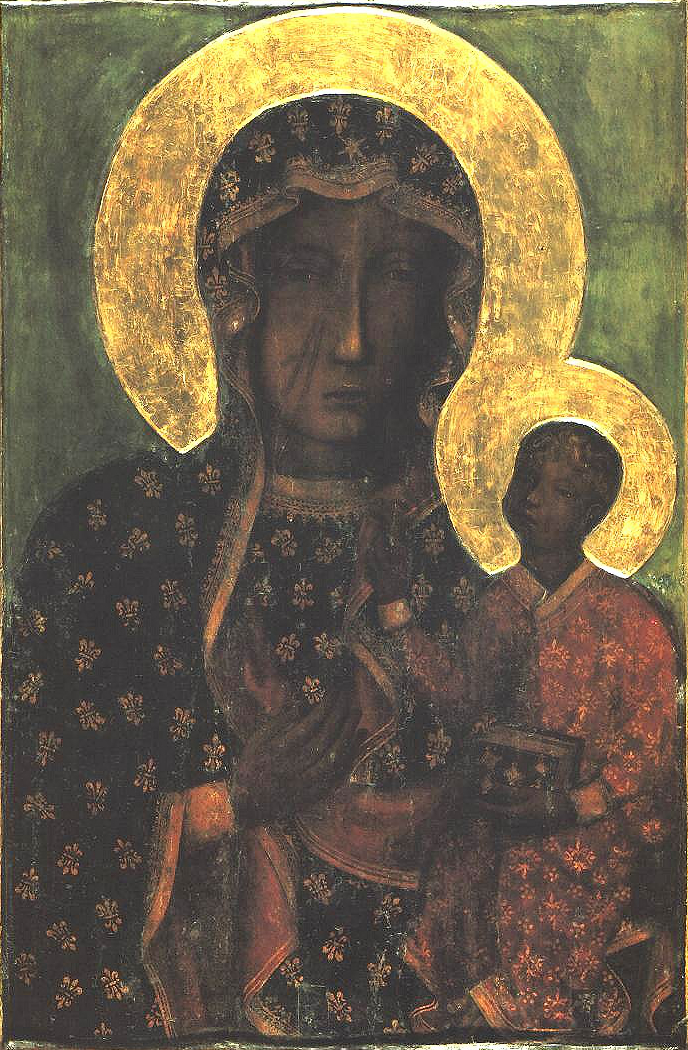
The Black Madonna of Częstochowa, Poland

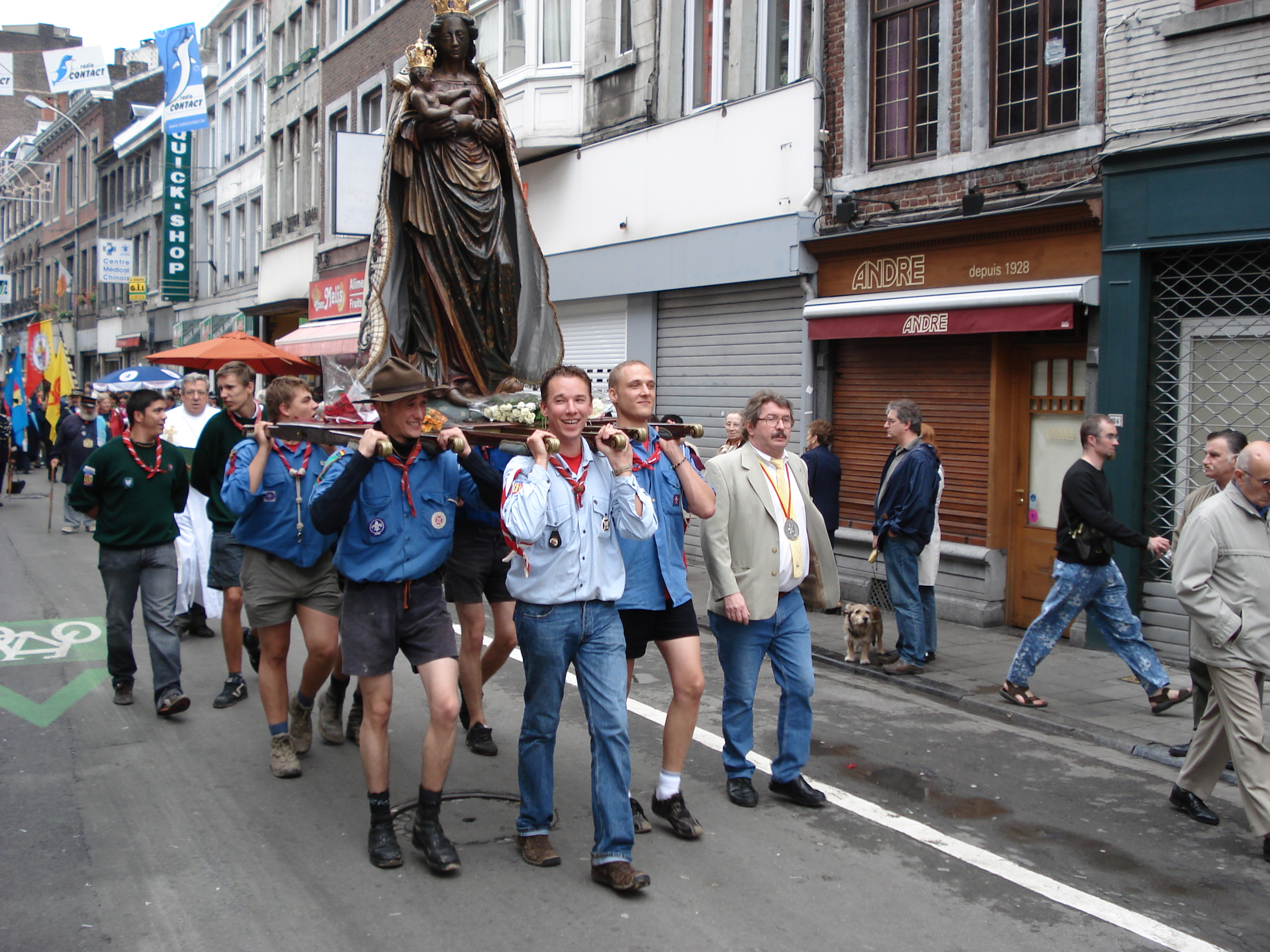
Black Madonna of Outremeuse, Liège, in a procession

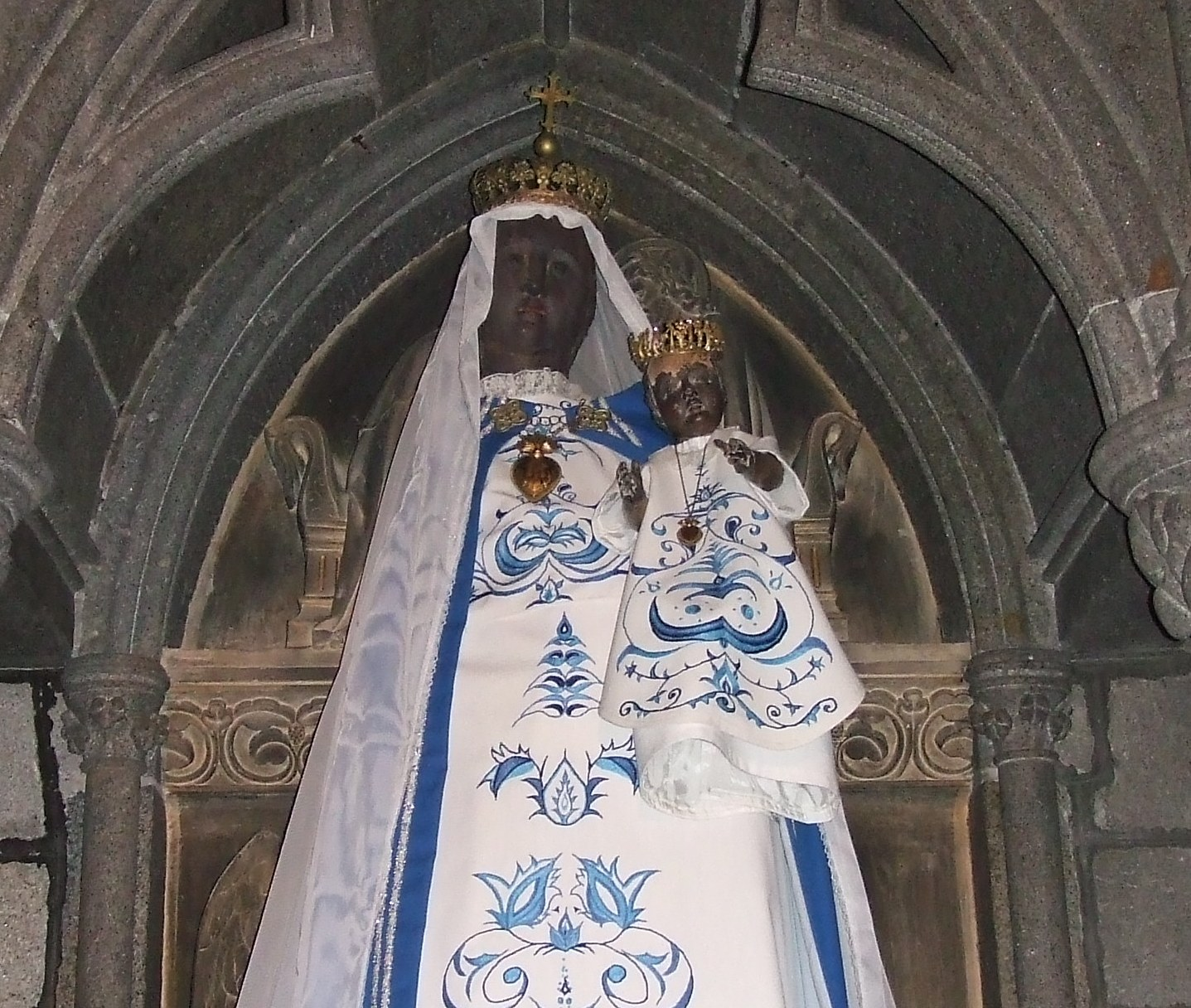
Black Madonna of Guingamp

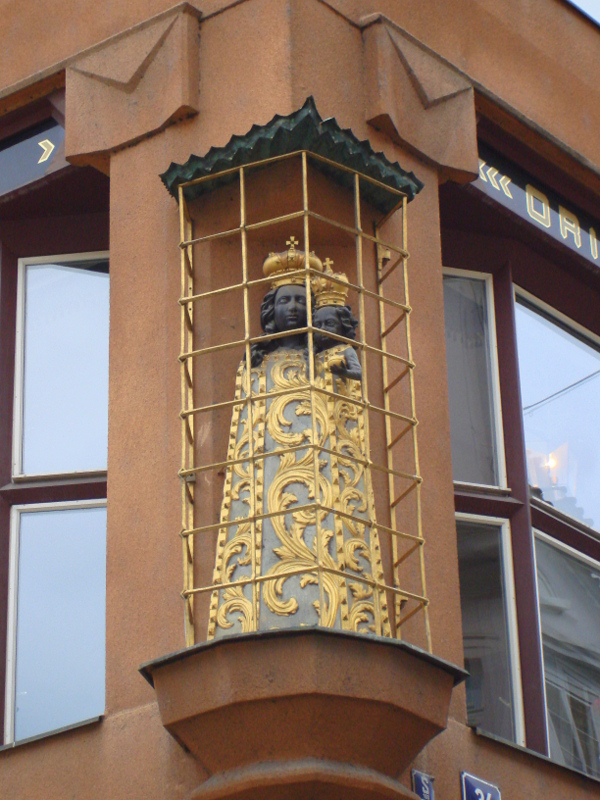
Madonna at House of the Black Madonna, Prague

The terms Black Madonna and Black Virgin refer to statues or paintings in Western Christendom of the Blessed Virgin Mary and the Infant Jesus, where both figures are depicted with dark skin. Examples of the Black Madonna can be found both in Catholic and Orthodox countries.

The paintings are usually icons, which are Byzantine in origin or style, some of which were produced in 13th or 14th-century Italy. Other examples from the Middle East, Caucasus or Africa, mainly Egypt and Ethiopia, are even older. Statues are often made of wood but are occasionally made of stone, painted, and up to 75 cm (30 in) tall. They fall into two main groups: free-standing upright figures or seated figures on a throne. About 400–500 Black Madonnas have been recorded in Europe, with the number related to how they are classified. There are at least 180 Vierges Noires in Southern France alone. There are hundreds of copies made since the medieval era. Some are displayed in museums, but most are in churches or shrines and are venerated by believers. Some are associated with miracles and attract substantial numbers of pilgrims.

Black Madonnas come in different forms. Speculations behind the basis of the dark hue of each individual icon or statue vary greatly and some have been controversial. Explanations range from the Madonnas being made from dark wood, Madonnas that have turned darker over time, due to factors such as aging or candle smoke, to a study by Jungian scholar Ean Begg into the potential pagan origins of the cult of the black Madonna and child or the intent to reflect the darker-skinned populations indigenous to certain parts of the world. Another suggestion is that dark-skinned representations of pre-Christian deities were re-envisioned as the Madonna and child.

== Studies and research ==
Research into the Black Madonna phenomenon is limited. Begg links a refrain from the Song of Solomon to the Queen of Sheba. This passage has been translated variously as "I am black, but comely" (King James Bible), or "Dark am I, yet lovely" (New International Version), among other translations. Recently, however, interest in this subject has gathered more momentum.

Important early studies of dark-skinned holy images in France were by Camille Flammarion (1888), Marie Durand-Lefebvre (1937), Emile Saillens (1945), and Jacques Huynen (1972).

The first notable study in English of the origin and meaning of the Black Madonnas appears to have been presented by Leonard Moss at a meeting of the American Association for the Advancement of Science on December 28, 1952. Moss divided the images into three categories: (1) dark brown or black Madonnas with physiognomy and skin pigmentation matching that of the indigenous population; (2) various art forms that have turned black as a result of certain physical factors such as deterioration of lead-based pigments, accumulated smoke from the use of votive candles, and accumulation of grime over the ages, and (3) miracle-worker Madonnas, the focus of the study, Black Madonnas found in areas of a Roman legion and, therefore, not a reflection of the indigenous population's skin colour.

In the cathedral at Chartres, there were two Black Madonnas: Notre Dame de Pilar, a 1508 dark walnut copy of a 13th-century silver Madonna, standing atop a high pillar, surrounded by candles; and Notre Dame de Sous-Terre, a replica of an original destroyed during the French Revolution. Restoration work on the cathedral resulted in the painting in 2014 of Notre Dame de Pilar, to reflect an earlier 19th-century painted style. The statue is no longer a "Black Madonna" and the restoration was severely criticized for wiping away the past.

Some scholars have chosen to explore the significance of the dark-skinned complexion to pilgrims and worshippers rather than focusing on whether this depiction was intentional. By virtue of their unusual presence, the Black Madonnas have sometimes acted to make their shrines revered pilgrimage sites. Monique Scheer attributes the importance of the dark-skinned depiction to its connection with authenticity. The reason for this connection is the perceived age of the figures.

== List of Black Madonnas ==
=== Africa ===
- Algeria, Algiers: "Our Lady of Africa"
- Ivory Coast, Yamoussoukro: Madonna and child inside Basilica of Our Lady of Peace.
- Senegal, Popenguine: "Notre-Dame de la Délivrance"
- South Africa, Soweto: "The Black Madonna"

=== Asia ===
==== Japan ====
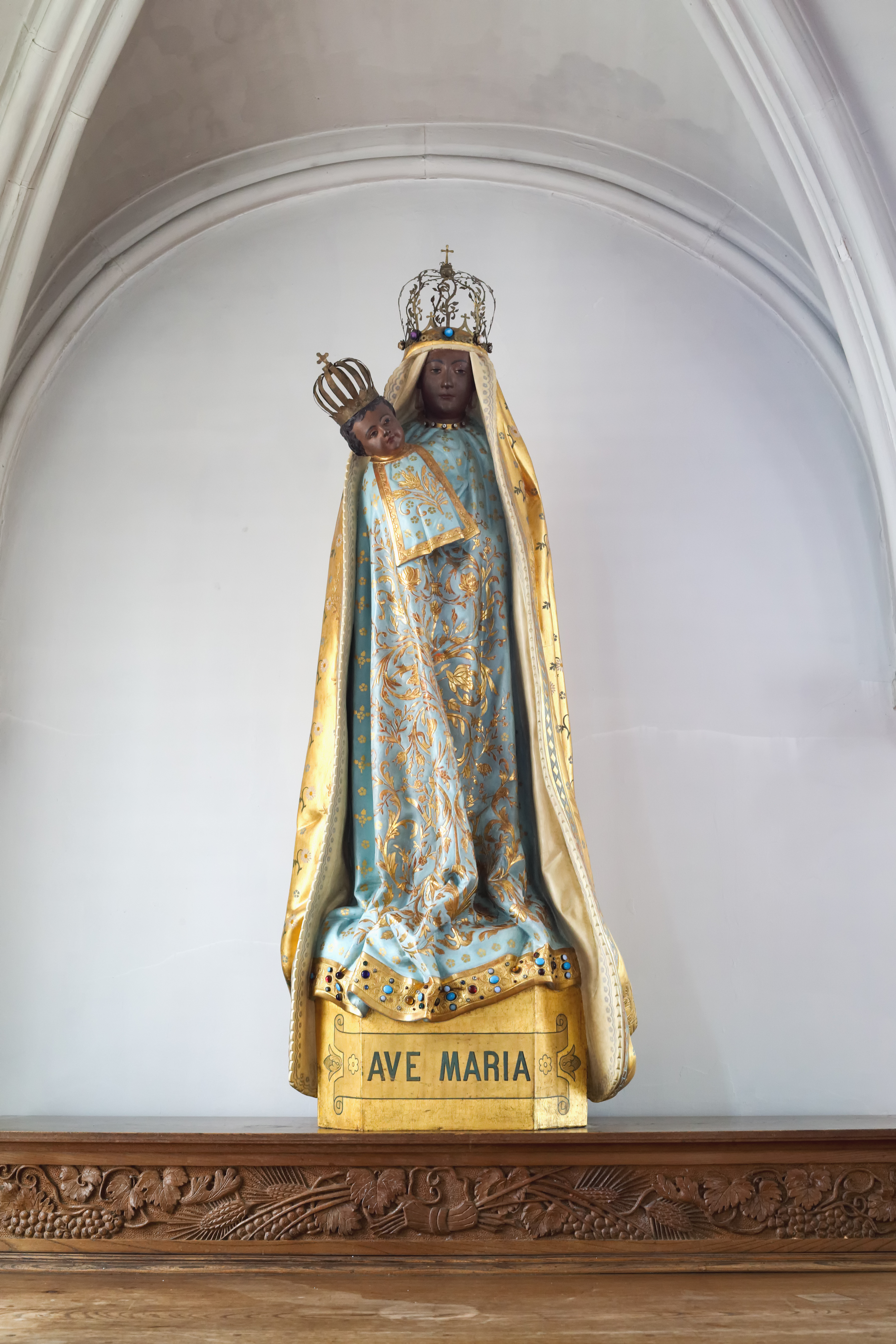
Black Madonna at Tsuraoka Catholic Church, Yamagata, Japan

- Tsuruoka City, Yamagata Prefecture: the Tenshudō Catholic Church features a Black Madonna statue from France dating to the Meiji Era.

==== The Philippines ====
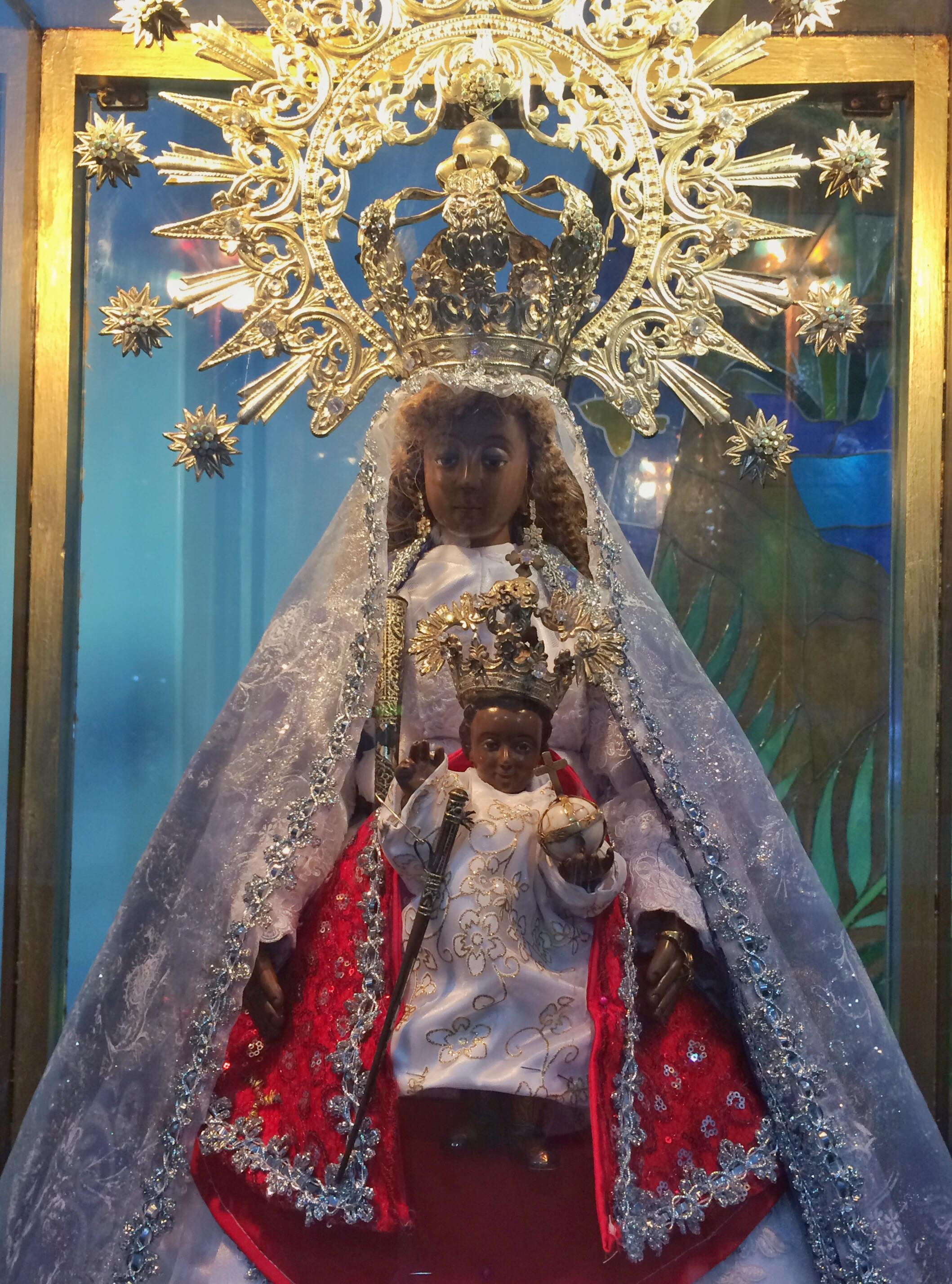
Our Lady of the Rule of Opón, Lapu-Lapu City, Cebu

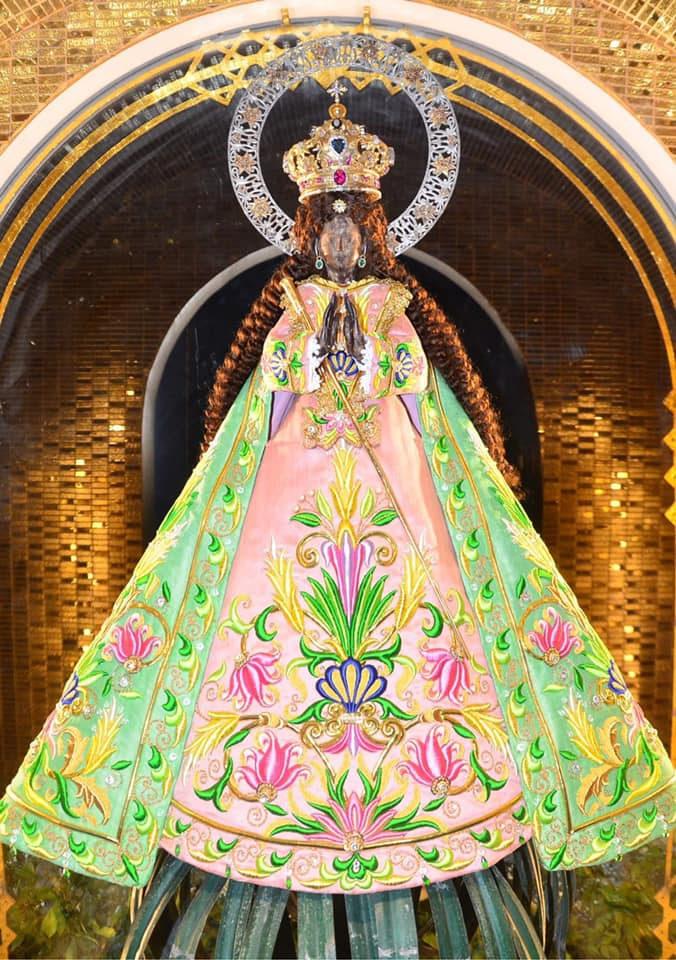
Our Lady of Guidance, Ermita, Manila

- Antipolo, Rizal: Nuestra Señora de la Paz y Buen Viaje de Antipolo (Our Lady of Peace and Good Voyage of Antipolo)
- Ermita, City of Manila: Nuestra Señora de Guía (Our Lady of Guidance)
- Santa Ana, City of Manila: Nuestra Señora de los Desamparados (Our Lady of the Abandoned)
- Parañaque: Nuestra Señora del Buen Suceso (Our Lady of the Good Event)
- Lapu-Lapu City: Nuestra Señora de Regla (Our Lady of the Rule)
- Naga, Camarines Sur: Nuestra Señora de Peñafrancia (Our Lady of Peñafrancia)
- Piat, Cagayan: Nuestra Señora de la Visitación de Piat (Our Lady of Piat)
- Joroan, Tiwi, Albay: Nuestra Señora de la Salvación (Our Lady of Salvation)

==== India ====
- Dhori Mata
- Korvi Mata, Dediapada, Gujarat

==== Turkey ====
- Trabzon: Sümela Monastery

=== Europe ===
==== Austria ====
- Lavanttal, Carinthia, Austria: St. Andrä im Lavanttal „Schwarze Madonna von Loreto" Basilica Maria Loreto

==== Belgium ====
- Brugge, "Our Lady of Regla"
- Brussels: "De Zwerte Lieve Vrouwe", St. Catherine Church
- Halle (Flemish Brabant) : Sint-Martinusbasiliek
- Liège: La Vierge Noire d'Outremeuse,
- Lier: Onze Lieve Vrouw ter Gratiën
- Scherpenheuvel-Zichem: Our Lady of Scherpenheuvel
- Tournai: Our Lady of Flanders in Tournai Cathedral
- Verviers: "Black Virgin of the Recollects", Notre-Dame des Récollets Church,
- Walcourt: (Notre-Dame de Walcourt)

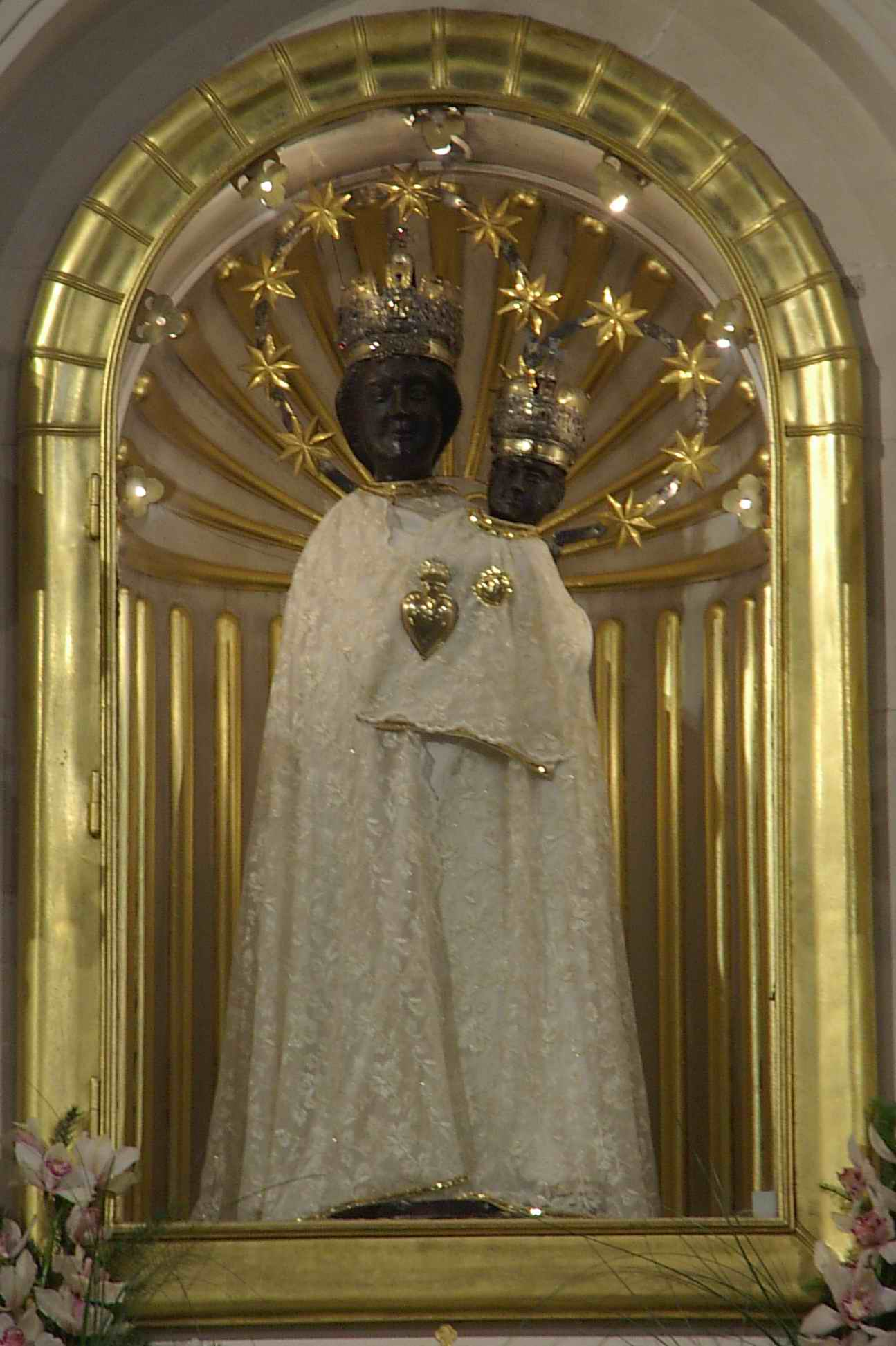
Marija Bistrica

==== Croatia ====
- Marija Bistrica: Our Lady of Bistrica, Queen of Croatia

==== Czech Republic ====
- Brno: Assumption of Virgin Mary Minor Basilica, St Thomas's Abbey, Brno
- Cesky Krumlov Monastery Museum
- Prague: The Madonna of Breznice; The Black Madonna in The Church of Our Lady Under the Chain (Kostel Panny Marie pod řetězem) The Black Madonna on the House of the Black Madonna.

TROJA CHATEAU chapel- original "Montserrat Madonna" from Old Town Byzantine building (pg.100 of Martin Krummholz ISBN 978-80-7010-131-5)

==== France ====
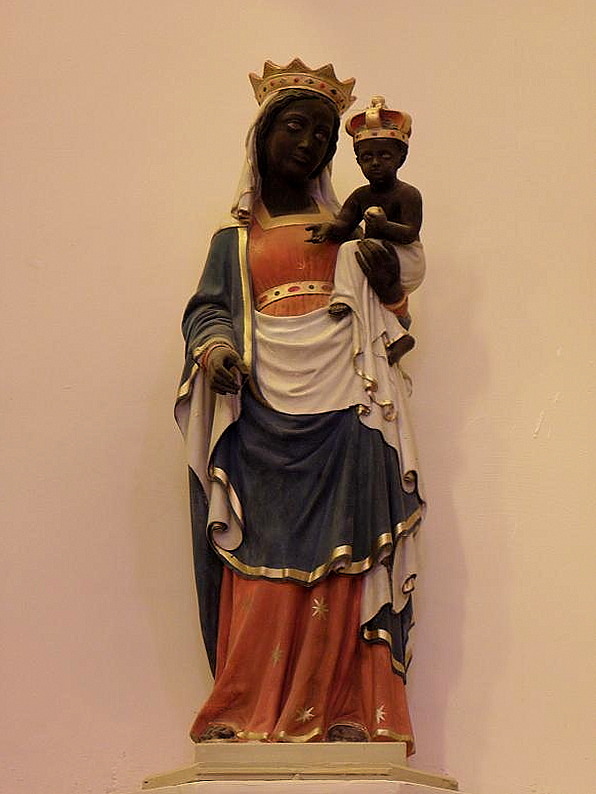
Madonna of Saint-Jouan-des-Guérets (35)

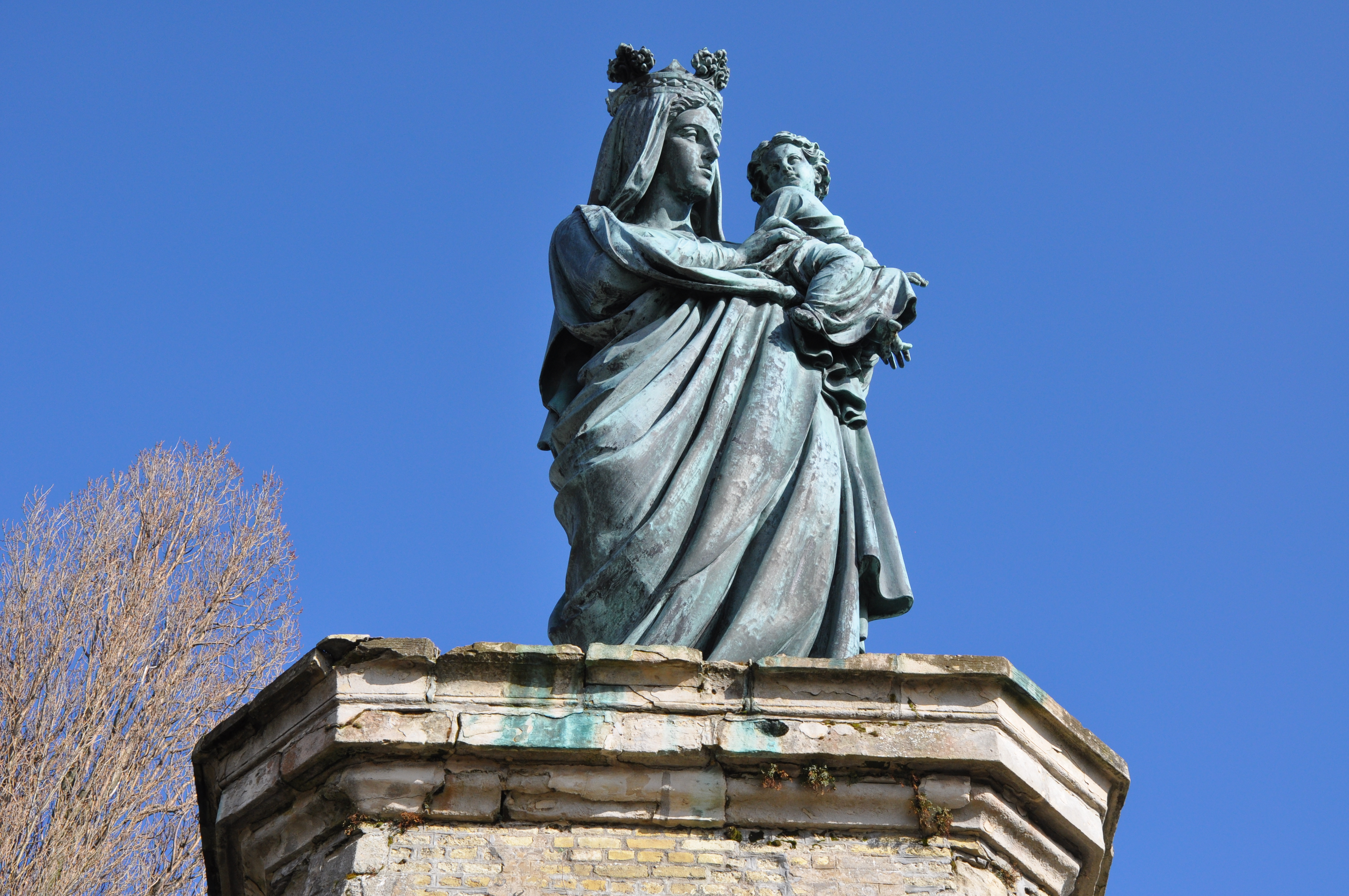
Vierge noire de Graville (Le Havre)

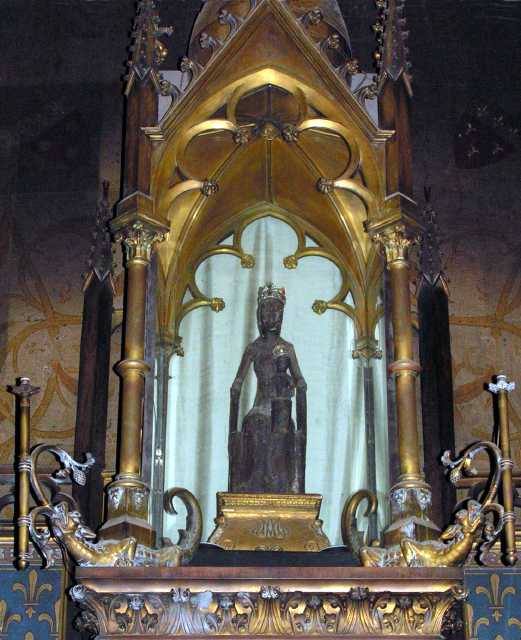
The statue of the Black Virgin at Rocamadour

- Aix-en-Provence, (Bouches-du-Rhône): Notre-Dame des Graces, Cathédrale Saint-Sauveur d'Aix
- Arconsat: (Notre-Dame des Champs)
- Aurillac (Cantal): Notre-Dame des Neiges
- Beaune: Our Lady of Beaune
- Besançon: Our Lady de Gray
- Besse-et-Saint-Anastaise, (Puy-de-Dôme): Saint-André Church, Notre-Dame de Vassivière
- Bourg-en-Bresse (Ain): 13th century
- Chartres, (Eure-et-Loir): crypt of the Cathedral of Chartres, Notre-Dame-de-Sous-Terre
- Clermont-Ferrand, (Puy-de-Dôme)
- Cusset: the Black Virgin of Cusset
- Dijon, (Côte-d'Or): Church of Notre-Dame of Dijon
- Douvres-la-Délivrande, Basilique Notre-Dame de la Délivrande, "Notre-Dame de la Délivrande"
- Dunkerque, (Nord) : Chapelle des Dunes
- Guingamp, (Côtes-d'Armor): Basilica of Notre Dame de Bon Secours.
- La Chapelle-Geneste, (Haute-Loire: Notre Dame de La Chapelle Geneste
- Laon (Aisne): Notre-Dame Cathedral, statue of 1848
- Le Havre,(Seine-Maritime): statue near the Graville Abbey (Abbaye de Graville)
- Le Puy-en-Velay: In 1254 when passing through on his return from the Holy Land Saint Louis IX of France gave the cathedral an ebony image of the Blessed Virgin clothed in gold brocade (Notre-Dame du Puy). It was destroyed during the Revolution, but replaced at the Restoration with a copy that continues to be venerated.
- Liesse-Notre-Dame (Aisne): Notre-Dame de Liesse, statue destroyed in 1793, copy of 1857
- Limeuil (Dordogne): Sainte Catherine d'Alexandrie á Limeuil. This XVII century statue was broken and thrown in the Dordogne during the French Wars of Religion (1562 - 1598) but recovered and returned to the church.
- Marseille, (Bouches-du-Rhône): Notre-Dame-de-Confession, Abbey of St. Victor; Notre-Dame d'Huveaune, Saint-Giniez Church
- Mauriac, Cantal: Notre Dame des Miracles
- Mende (Lozère) : Cathedral (Basilique-cathédrale Notre-Dame-et-Saint-Privat de Mende)
- Menton, (Alpes-Maritimes): St. Michel Church
- Meymac (Corrèze): Meymac Abbey
- Molompize: Notre-Dame de Vauclair
- Mont-Saint-Michel: Notre-Dame du Mont-Tombe
- Myans (Savoie): Sanctuaire Notre-Dame de Myans
- Paris, (Neuilly-sur-Seine): Notre-Dame de Bonne Délivrance, in the motherhouse of the Sisters of St. Thomas of Villanova
- Quimper (Finistère): Eglise de Guéodet, nommée encore Notre-Dame-de-la-Cité
- Riom, (Puy-de-Dôme): Notre-Dame du Marthuret
- Rocamadour, (Lot): Our Lady of Rocamadour
- Saint-Germain-Laval: Chapelle Notre-Dame-de-Baffy
- Sainte Marie (Réunion) : Black Virgin of the Rains River
- Saintes-Maries-de-la-Mer (Camargue) Avignon: Annual Roma pilgrimage and festival celebrating Sara, the patron saint of the Roma
- Soissons (Aisne): statue of the 12th century
- Tarascon, (Bouches-du-Rhône): Notre-Dame du Château
- Thuret, (Puy-de-Dôme)
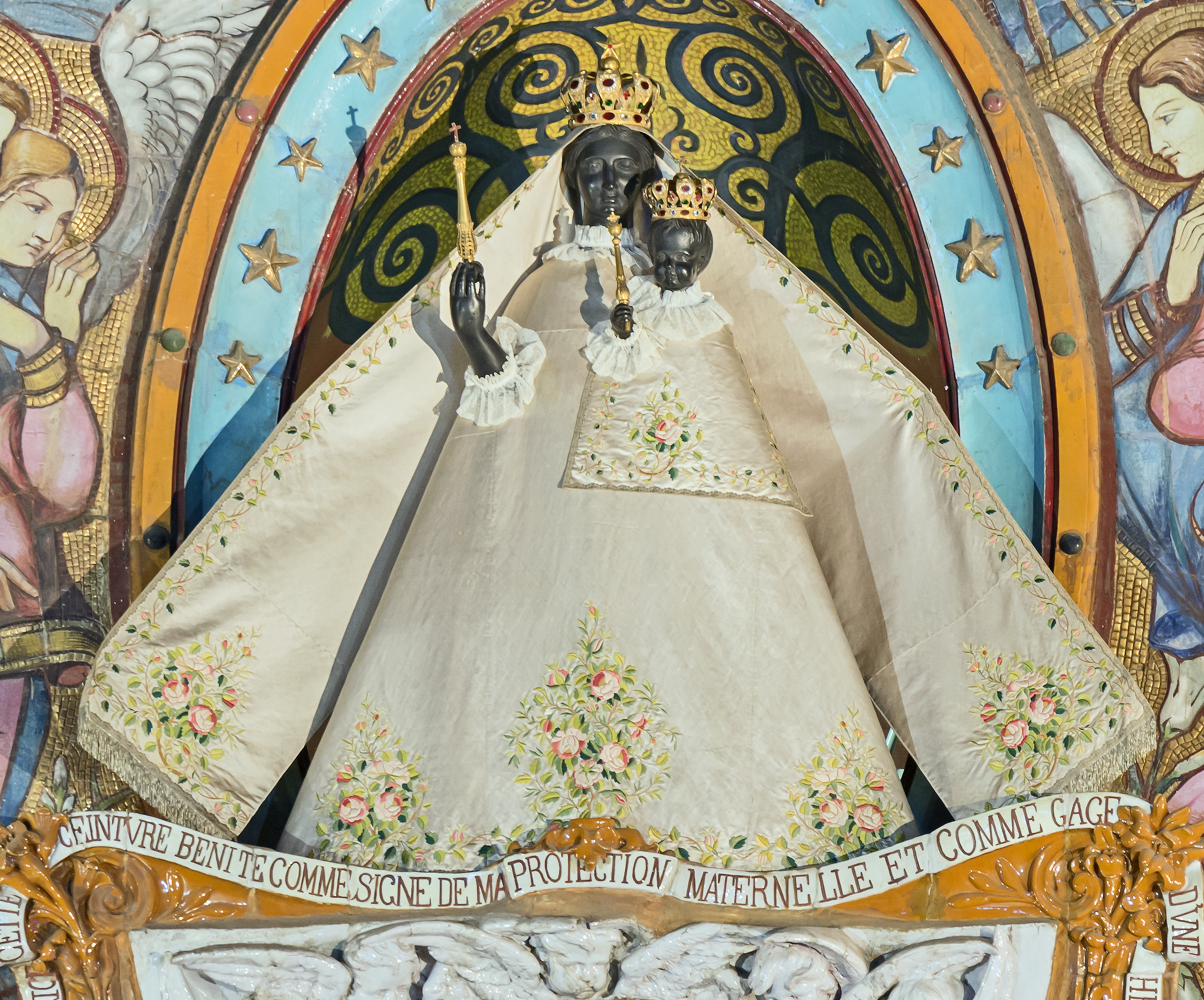
- Black Madonna of Toulouse
  Toulouse: The basilica Notre-Dame de la Daurade in Toulouse, France had housed the shrine of a Black Madonna. The original icon was stolen in the fifteenth century, and its first replacement was burned by Revolutionaries in 1799 on the Place du Capitole. The icon presented today is an 1807 copy of the fifteenth century Madonna. Blackened by the hosts of candles, the second Madonna was known from the sixteenth century as Our Lady La Noire
- Tournemire, Château d'Anjony, Our Lady of Anjony
- Vaison-la-Romaine (Vaucluse): statue on a hill
- Vichy (Allier): Saint-Blaise Church

==== Germany ====
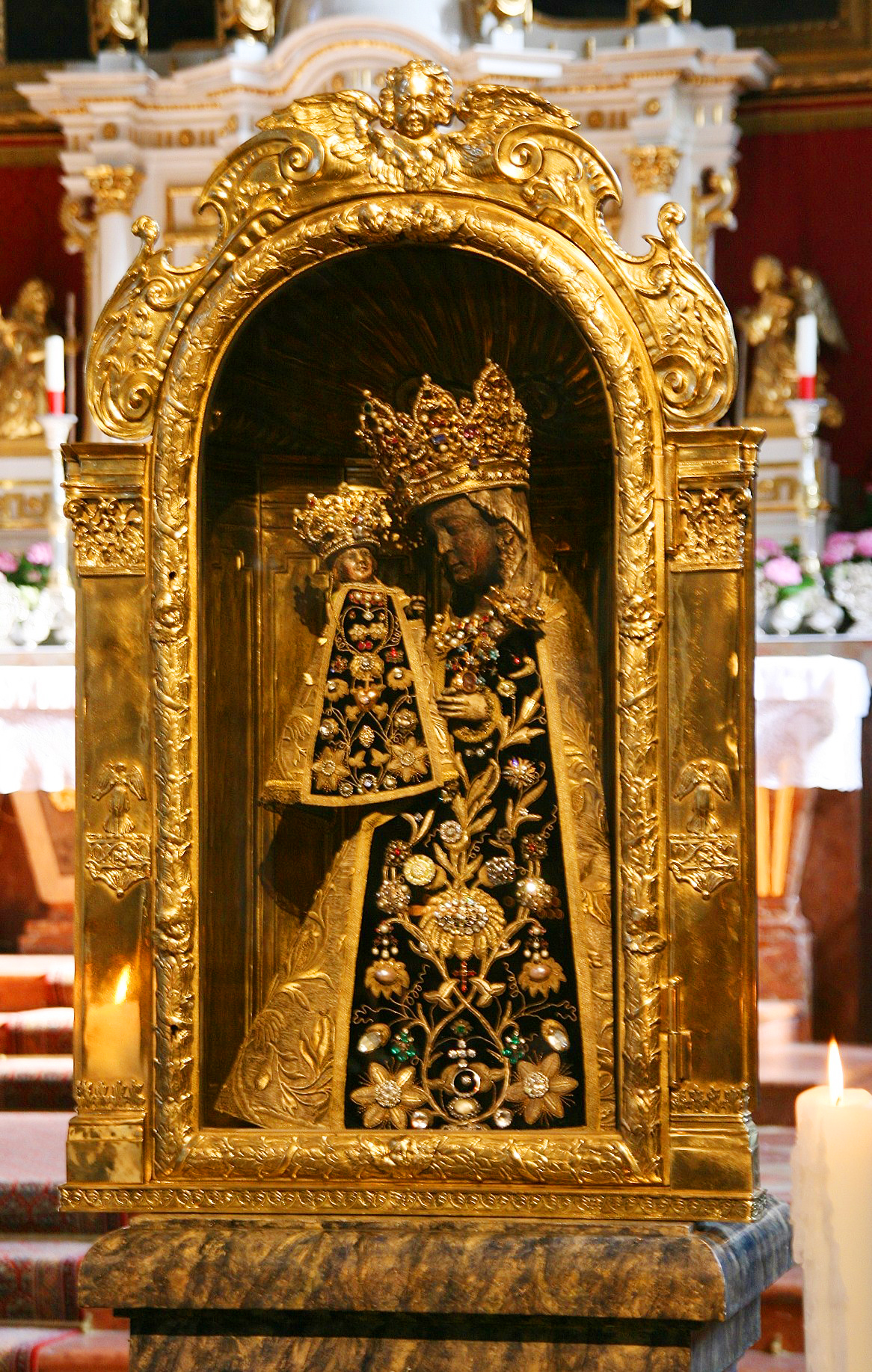
Shrine of Our Lady of Altötting, Altötting: Gnadenkapelle

- Altötting (Bavaria): Gnadenkapelle (Chapel of the Miraculous Image)
- Beilstein (Rhineland-Palatinate): Karmeliterkirche St. Joseph
- Bielefeld (North Rhine-Westphalia)
- Düsseldorf-Benrath (North Rhine-Westphalia): Pfarrkirche St. Cäcilia
- Hirschberg an der Bergstraße (Baden-Württemberg): Wallfahrtskirche St. Johannes Baptist
- Schloss Hohenstein, Upper Franconia (Bavaria)
- Köln (North Rhine-Westphalia): St. Maria in der Kupfergasse
- Ludwigshafen-Oggersheim (Rhineland-Palatinate): Schloss- und Wallfahrtskirche Mariä Himmelfahrt (Ludwigshafen)
- Mainau (Baden-Württemberg): Schlosskirche St. Marien
- Munich (Bavaria): Theatine Church; St. Boniface's Abbey
- Rastatt (Baden-Württemberg): Einsiedelner Kapelle
- Regensburg (Bavaria): Regensburg Cathedral
- Remagen (Rhineland-Palatinate): Kapelle Schwarze Madonna
- Spabrücken (Rhineland-Palatinate)
- Stetten ob Lontal, Niederstotzingen (Baden-Württemberg)
- Windhausen in Boppard-Herschwiesen (Rhineland-Palatinate)
- Wipperfürth (North Rhine-Westphalia): St. Johannes, Kreuzberg
- Wuppertal-Beyenburg (North Rhine-Westphalia)

==== Greece ====
- Hidden church of the Black Madonna, Vamos, Crete

==== Hungary ====
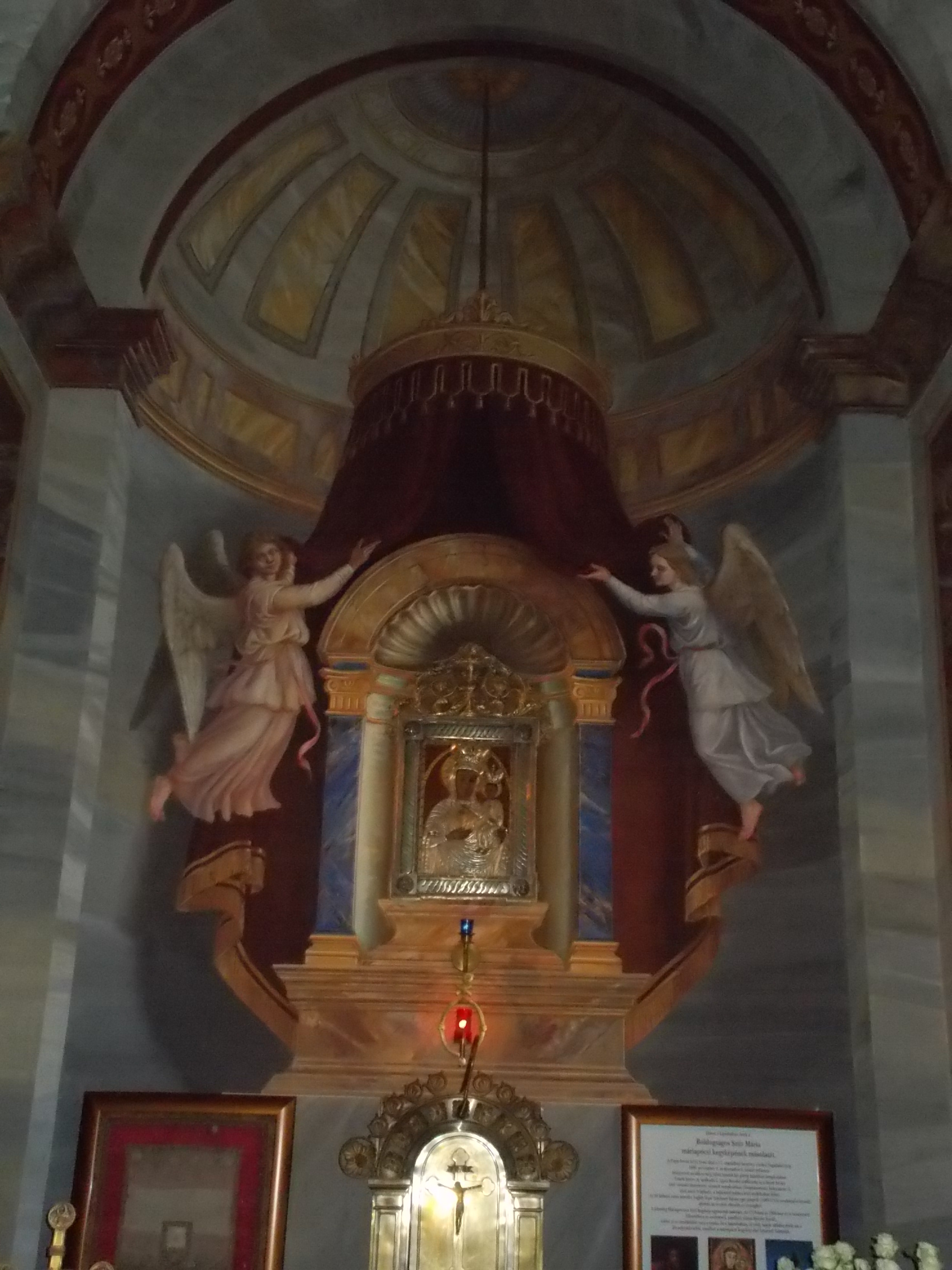
Our Lady of the Immaculate Conception, Cathedral Basilica of Eger, Hungary

- Cathedral Basilica of Eger: Our Lady of the Immaculate Conception

==== Ireland ====
- Dublin (Leinster): Our Lady of Dublin in Whitefriar Street Carmelite Church

==== Italy ====
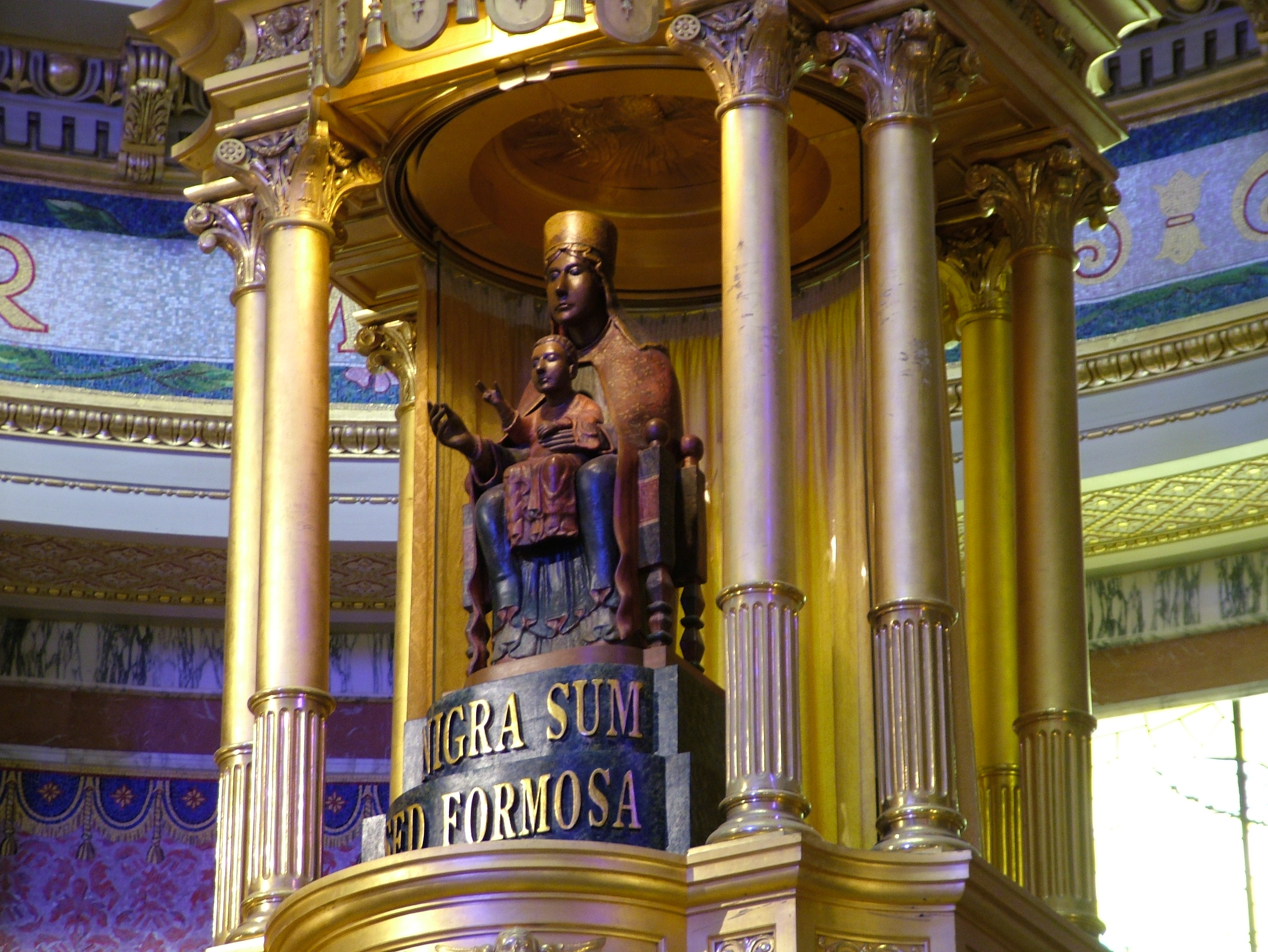
Tindari Madonna Bruna: restoration work in the 1990s found a medieval statue with later additions. Nigra sum sed formosa, meaning "I am black but beautiful" (from the Song of Songs, 1:5), is inscribed round a newer base.

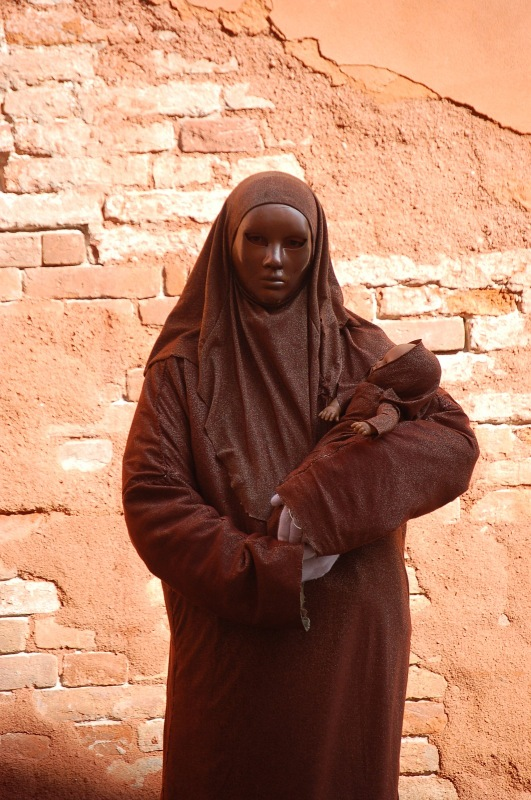
Street performer in Black Madonna costume in Venice

- Biella (Piedmont): Black Virgin of Oropa, sanctuary of Oropa
- Canneto Valley near Settefrati (Lazio): Madonna di Canneto
- Casale Monferrato (Piedmont): Our Lady of Crea. In the hillside Sanctuary at Crea (Santuario di Crea), a cedar-wood figure, said to be one of three Black Virgins brought to Italy from the Holy Land c. 345 by St. Eusebius.
- Castelmonte, Prepotto (Friuli-Venezia Giulia)
- Gubbio, Italy: The Niger-Regin square, discovered carved in the cave of Sibilla Eugubina on Mount Ingino, is considered to be a word square form of the "Black Queen". Seemingly of neo-Templar origin, it is dated between 1600–1800 CE, was discovered in 2003, and destroyed by vandalism in 2012.
- Loreto (Marche): Basilica della Santa Casa
- Montevergine (Campania): Mamma Schiavona (lit. "Slave Mamma") located at Sanctuary of Montevergine
- Naples (Campania): Santuario-Basilica SS Carmine Maggiore
- Pescasseroli (Abruzzo): Madonna di Monte Tranquillo
- Positano (Campania): Located in the church of Santa Maria Assunta, the story of how it got there—sailors shouting "Posa, posa!" ("Put it down, put it down!")—gave the town its name.
- San Severo (Apulia): "La Madonna del Soccorso" (The Madonna of Succor), St. Severinus Abbot and Saint Severus Bishop Faeto. Statue in gold garments, object of a major three-day festival that attracts over 350,000 people to this small town.
- Seminara (Calabria): Maria Santissima dei poveri
- Tindari (Sicily): Our Lady of Tindari
- Torre Annunziata (Campania): Madonna della Neve
- Venice (Veneto): Madonna della Salute, Santa Maria della Salute
- Viggiano (Basilicata): Santuario Madonna del Sacro Monte

==== Kosovo ====
- Vitina-Letnica: Church of the Black Madonna, where Mother Teresa is believed to have heard her calling.

==== Lithuania ====
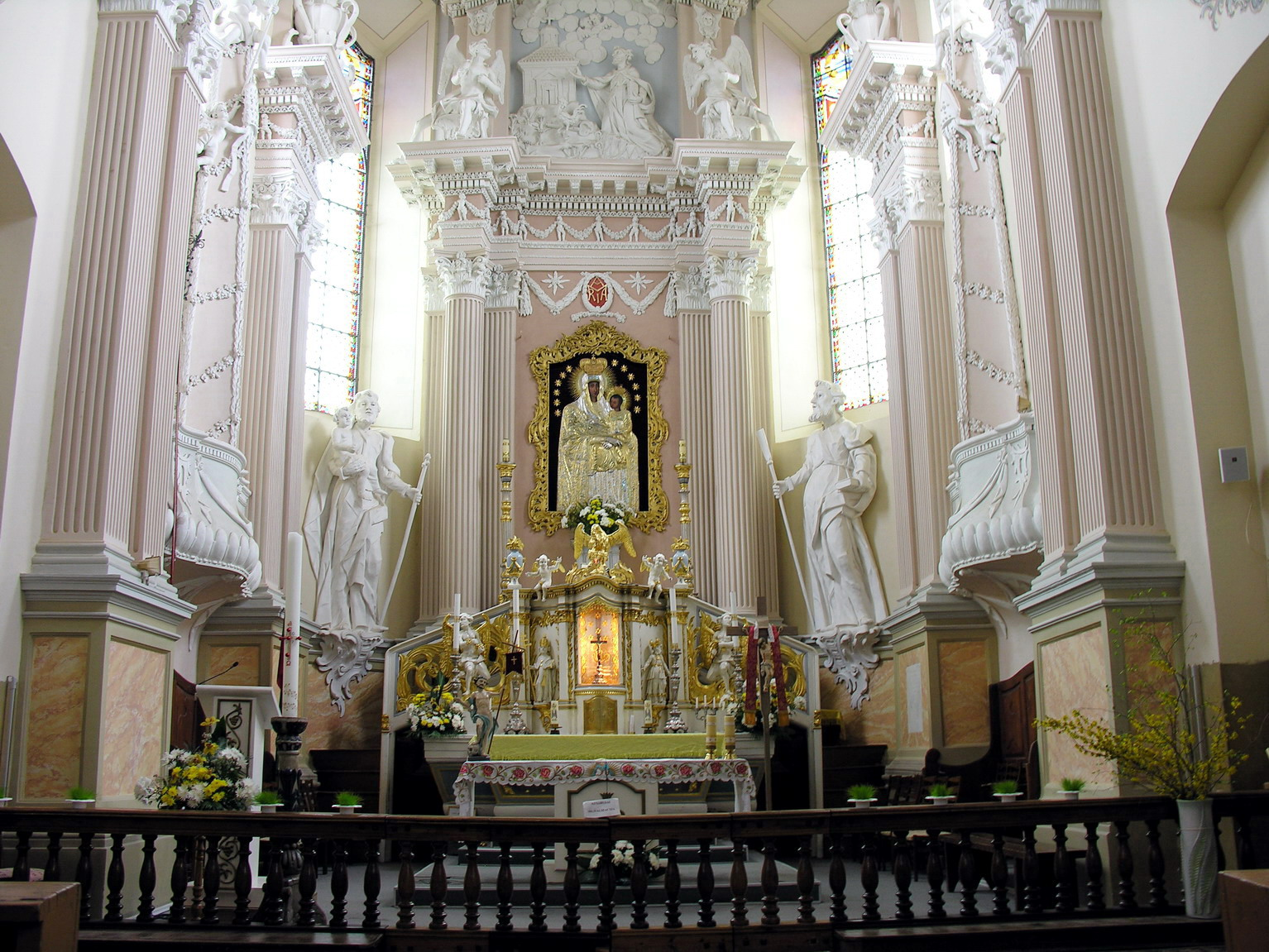
Our Lady of the Pine Woods Lithuania

- Aušros vartai: Our Lady of the Gate of Dawn
- Our Lady of Šiluva: Our Lady of the Pine Woods

==== Luxembourg ====
- Esch-sur-Sûre
- Luxembourg City: Grund
- Luxembourg City: St. John's Church

==== Macedonia ====
- Kališta, Monastery: Madonna icon in the Nativity of Our Most Holy Mother of God church
- Ohrid, Church: Madonna with the child

==== Malta ====
- Ħamrun: Our Lady of Atoċja, a medieval painting brought to Malta by a merchant in the year 1630, depicting a statue found in Atocha, a parish in Madrid, Spain, and widely known as Il-Madonna tas-Samra. (This can mean 'tanned Madonna', 'brown Madonna', or 'Madonna of Samaria'.)

==== Poland ====
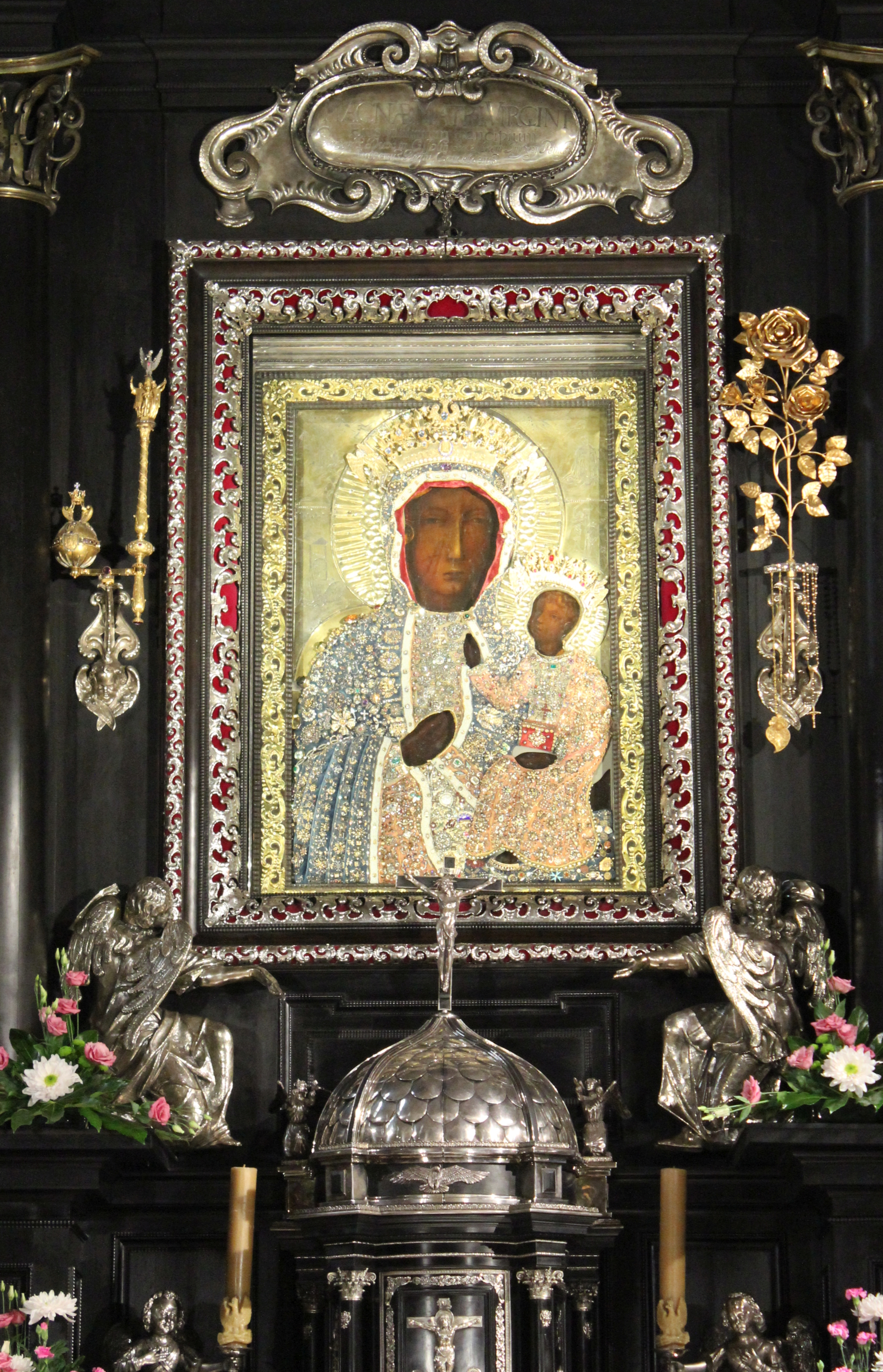
Icon of the Black Madonna of Częstochowa, covered in a decorative silver shield, at the Jasna Góra Monastery in Poland

- Częstochowa: Our Lady of Czestochowa
  - In the United States, the National Shrine of Our Lady of Czestochowa, in Doylestown, Pennsylvania houses a reproduction of the Black Madonna of Częstochowa. A second shrine to Our Lady of Częstochowa is located near Eureka, Missouri.
  - In Israel there are two reproductions of the Black Madonna of Częstochowa: One in St. Peter's Church in Tel Aviv, and another in the Abbey of the Dormition in Jerusalem.
- Głogówek: Our Lady of Loretto

==== Portugal ====
- Nazaré (Oeste Subregion): Sanctuary of Our Lady of Nazaré; see: the legend of Nazaré

==== Romania ====
- Ghighiu: Maica Domnului Siriaca – Manastirea Ghighiu
- Cacica: Madona Neagra – Biserica Cacica
- Bucuresti: Madona Neagra – Biserica Dichiu

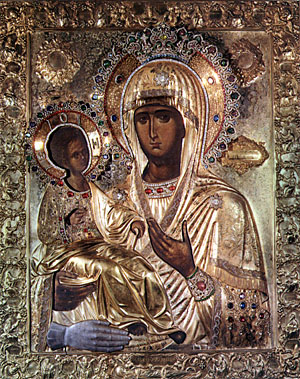
Three-handed Black Madonna, in the Serbian Orthodox monastery at Hilandar

==== Russia ====
- Kostroma (Kostroma Oblast): Theotokos of St. Theodore also known as Our Lady of St. Theodore (Федоровская Богоматерь), in Theophany Monastery
- Our Lady of Wladimir, from the 12th century
- Black Virgin of Taganrog, Taganrog Old Cemetery

==== Serbia ====
- Apatin: Blessed Virgin Mary Catholic Church

==== Slovenia ====
- Koprivna, Črna na Koroškem: St. Anne's Church, Koprivna – the altar of Black Madonna

==== Spain ====
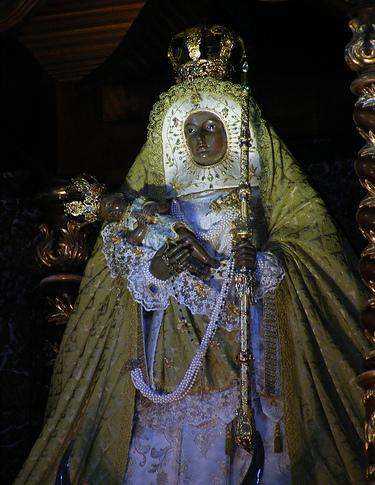
Image of the Virgin of Candelaria, in the Basilica of Candelaria (Tenerife)

- Andújar (Province of Jaén): Nuestra Señora de la Cabeza (Our Lady of Cabeza), named after the mountain, Cerro de la Cabeza or Cerro de Cabezo.
- Chipiona (Province of Cádiz): la Virgen de Regla or Nuestra Señora de Regla (Our Lady of Regla or the Virgin of Regla), considered by some as the custodian of the Rule of Saint Augustine
- Coria (Province of Cáceres): Virgen de Argeme (Our Lady of Argeme)
- El Puerto de Santa María (Province of Cádiz): Virgen de los Milagros (The Virgin of the Miracles)
- Guadalupe (Province of Cáceres): Nuestra Señora de Guadalupe (Our Lady of Guadalupe, Extremadura)
- Jerez de la Frontera (Province of Cádiz): Nuestra Señora de la Merced (Our Lady Of Mercy)
- Madrid (Community of Madrid): Nuestra Señora de Atocha (Our Lady of Atocha)
- Lluc, Mallorca (Balearic Islands): Mare de Déu de Lluc (Our Lady of Lluc), Lluc Monastery
- Monistrol de Montserrat (Catalonia): Mare de Déu de Montserrat (Virgin of Montserrat) or "La Moreneta" in the Benedictine abbey of Santa Maria de Montserrat
- Ponferrada (Province of León): Virgen de la Encina (Our Lady of the Holm Oak)
- Salamanca (Province of Salamanca): Virgen de la Peña de Francia (The Virgin of France's Rock, named after the local mountain called Peña de Francia)
- Santiago de Compostela (Galicia): A replica of "La Moreneta"
- Rianxo (Galicia): Virgen de Guadalupe
- Tenerife (Canary Islands): Nuestra Señora de la Candelaria (Virgin of Candelaria), or "La Morenita"
- Toledo (Province of Toledo): Virgen Morena (Dark Virgin), statue of La Esclavitud de Nuestra Señora del Sagrario in the Cathedral of Toledo (Catedral Primada de Santa María) (The Enslavement of Our Lady of the Tabernacle)
- Torreciudad (Huesca): Our Lady of Torreciudad

==== Sweden ====
- Lund Cathedral Attached to a marble pillar in the crypt: Black madonna with child
- Skee Kyrka, Skee, Bohuslän former Norwegian province. Black madonna with beheaded child

==== Switzerland ====
- Einsiedeln (Canton of Schwyz): Our Lady of the Hermits
  - In the United States, a reproduction of Our Lady of the Hermits was gifted to the St. Meinrad Archabbey located in St. Meinrad, Indiana
- Sonogno, Valle Verzasca (Canton of Ticino): Santa Maria Loretana
- Uetikon am See (Canton of Zürich): Catholic Church Saint Francis of Assisi
- Metzerlen-Mariastein (Canton of Solothurn): Mariastein Abbey
- Ascona (Canton of Ticino): Black Chapel
- Lugano (Canton of Ticino): Chiesa di Santa Maria di Loreto

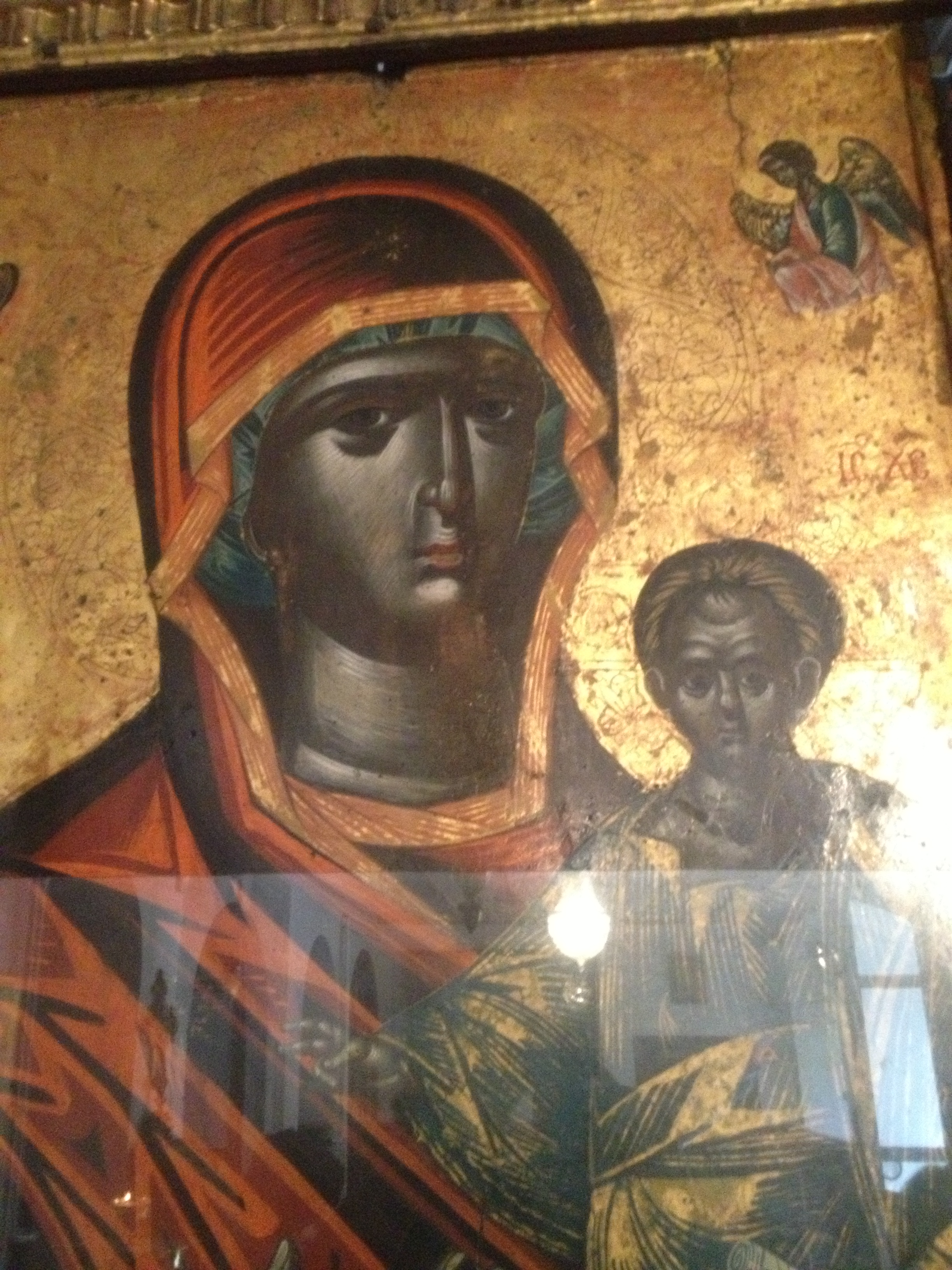
One of three of Turkey's surviving icons of the Theotokos on the island of Heybeliada at the Theological School of Halki

==== Ukraine ====
- Tsarytsya Karpat (Hoshiv Monastery): The Queen of the Carpathian Land

==== United Kingdom ====
- St. Mary Willesden (Our Lady of Willesden): The original Shrine of Our Lady of Willesden.
- Our Lady of Częstochowa (Church of Our Lady of Czestochowa, Nottingham)

=== North America ===
==== Costa Rica ====
- Cartago, Cartago Province: Basílica de Nuestra Señora de los Ángeles (Our Lady of the Angels Basilica)

==== Cuba ====
- Regla, Havana Province: Nuestra Señora de Regla (Spanish for Our Lady of Regla)

==== Mexico ====
- Tepeyac, Mexico City: Our Lady of Guadalupe

==== Trinidad and Tobago ====
- Siparia: La Divina Pastora
- Gran Couva: Our Lady of Montserrat

==== United States ====
- Pacific, Missouri: Black Madonna Shrine and Grottos
- Doylestown, Pennsylvania: National Shrine of Our Lady of Czestochowa
- Jersey City, New Jersey: Our Lady of Czestochowa
- New York City, New York: Cathedral of St. John the Divine
- New York City, New York: Church of St. Ignatius Loyola
- Detroit, Michigan: Shrine of the Black Madonna Church
- Chicago, Illinois: Monastery of the Holy Cross
- Westport, Connecticut: Church of the Assumption
- Cheektowaga, New York: Our Lady of Czestochowa Roman Catholic Church
- North Tonawanda, New York: Our Lady of Czestochowa Church
- Tulsa, Oklahoma: Our Lady of the Heights

==== Canada ====
- Windsor, Ontario -Black Madonna chapel located at Italian banquet hall Ciociaro club.

=== South America ===
==== Brazil ====
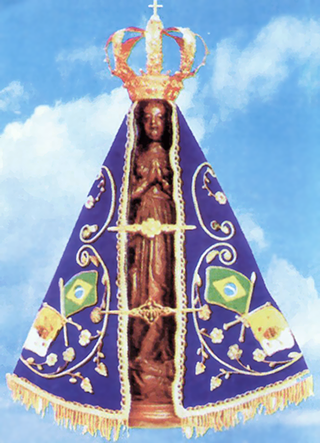
Nossa Senhora Aparecida

- Aparecida, São Paulo: Our Lady of Aparecida or Our Lady Appeared (Nossa Senhora Aparecida or Nossa Senhora da Conceição Aparecida) in the Basilica of the National Shrine of Our Lady of Aparecida

==== Chile ====
- Andacollo, Elqui Province: La Virgen Morena (Spanish for The Brunette Virgin)

== See also ==
- Golden Madonna of Essen
- Black Nazarene
- La virgen negra
- Mariology
- Sofia, Bulgaria

== Sources ==
- Channell, J., "Black Virgin Sites in France"
- Rozett, Ella. "Index of Black Madonnas Worldwide", InterfaithMary.net
