= St. Anne's Church, Koprivna =

Roman Catholic church in Slovenia

Coordinates: 46.4826°N 14.7232°E

St. Anne's Church is a Roman Catholic church in Koprivna in the Municipality of Črna na Koroškem, northern Slovenia. The altar of the Black Madonna dates to the 14th century.
