= Black Madonna Shrine and Grottos =

Shrine located in Missouri, United States

Coordinates: 38.41293°N 90.68286°W

The Black Madonna Shrine and Grottos is a Catholic Marian shrine complex located in the unincorporated area south of Pacific, Missouri in the United States. It was constructed beginning in 1938 by Brother Bronislaus Luszcz, a Polish immigrant of the Franciscan order.

== History ==
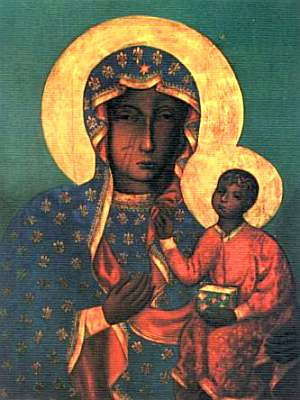
Black Madonna of Częstochowa

In 1927, John J. Glennon, Archbishop of St. Louis requested a group of Franciscans to come from Poland to set up a nursing home in the countryside. A number of Franciscan Missionary Brothers of the Sacred Heart of Jesus emigrated from Poland to the St. Louis area. Among them was Brother Bronislaus Luszcz, age thirty-four. They were given an abandoned convent in the foothills of the Ozarks, and built an infirmary. The brothers had a small farm that produced food for the infirmary and brothers. The Black Madonna Shrine is adjacent to the site of the infirmary which closed in 2008.

In 1937, Brother Bronislaus began clearing the thickly wooded land, built a cedar wood chapel and hung a portrait of the Black Madonna of Częstochowa above the altar. The image is referred as the Black Madonna because of its dark brown skin tones. The chapel soon became a center of religious devotion, with numerous pilgrimages, prayer services and masses being offered. A picnic pavilion is on site.

The Black Madonna Shrine was built out of his devotion to Mary, and dedicated to her as "Queen of Peace and Mercy". After completing the chapel, Brother Bronislaus began building grottoes, using concrete and native Missouri tiff rock acquired from the nearby mining town of Potosi. The stone and rock structures are made to resemble natural cave formations. The grottos feature statues of Saint Francis, Saint Joseph, Our Lady of Perpetual Help, Jesus and the disciples at Gethsemane, Our Lady of Sorrows, Mary's Assumption, and the Nativity. Each is an intricate mosaic with seashells, costume jewelry, ceramic figurines, and colorful bits brought to him by pilgrims from time to time. Cake pans shaped like lambs and rabbits became molds for the concrete animals that sit at the feet of St. Francis. The altar stone at the Our Lady of Sorrows Grotto is from the original monastery chapel. The Crucifix of the Gethsemane Grotto is used as landmark by local hikers making their way through the nearby woods.

Brother Bronislaus spent twenty three years building the shrine, and died from heat stroke in 1960 at the age of sixty-six, while working on a grotto of Our Lady of Fatima.

The shrine has been subjected to arson and vandalism many times in its history. In 1958 an arsonist set fire to the altar which burned the chapel. An open-air chapel was built in the early 1960s to replace the burned chapel. Cardinal Stefan Wyszyński, Primate of Poland, donated a painting to replace one lost in the fire. John Carberry, Cardinal Archbishop of St. Louis donated a glass-encased icon of Our Lady of Czestochowa from the former Church of Our Lady of Czestochowa in St. Louis.

In 2013, a thief broke into shrine gift shop and stole some sterling silver medals, silver plated necklaces, and a donation jar containing change.

== See also ==
- National Shrine of Our Lady of Czestochowa
