= Marie Durand-Lefebvre =

- Born: Marie Durand; 1885
- Died: 1962 (aged 76–77)
- Education: École des Hautes Études (Ph.D.)
- Occupations: Art historian and curator
- Notable work: Marques de potiers gallo-romains trouvées à Paris et conservées principalement au musée Carnavalet (1963)

Marie Durand-Lefebvre (1885–1962) was an art historian and curator in France. She was an expert on gallo-roman pottery and Roman sculpture, and the project manager at the Carnavalet Museum.

Graduating from l'École du Louvre in 1926 with a BA, Durand-Lefebvre earned a doctorate of philosophy from l'École des Hautes Études in 1937. A scholar of the Black Virgin, she investigated black madonnas—especially ones located throughout the holy land. Durand later worked under Jules Toutain (1865–1961) as a project manager at the Carnavalet Museum. Focusing on pottery of Roman Gaul, Durand catalogued 877 potters' stamps found throughout Paris. Although Durand died before the catalogue could be published, it was later issued after a final revision by Mlle. H. Verlet and Mlle. Jacqueline Bayard.

Durand led guided tours throughout Paris's famous museums including at the Louvre, the Musée de l'Assistance Publique, the Musée de Cluny, and the Musée des Arts Décoratifs. Durand also wrote in the Bulletin de la Société nationale des Antiquaires de France.

== Selected works ==
- [Dissertation:] Étude sur l’origine des Vierges Noires. l’École des Hautes Études, 1937. [published] Paris: G. Durassié, 1937.
- Les vestiges antiques et le culte des sources au Mont-Dore. Le Puy: La Haute-Loire, 1926.
- Art gallo-romain et sculpture romane, recherche sur les formes. Paris: G. Durassié, 1937.
- Les vestiges antiques et le culte des sources au Mont-Dore. Le Puy [France]: Imp. "La Haute-Loire"
- "Le statuaire Hippolyte Lefebvre vu par sa fille." Gazette Des Beaux-Arts / Fondée Par Charles Blanc. 6: 38-52, 1949.
- "Une statue du Musée d'Albi". Bulletin De La Société Nationale Des Antiquaires De France / Société Nationale Des Antiquaires De France. 61-62, 1955.
- "Poteries Gallo-Romaines Trouvées à Alésia." Bulletin De La Société Nationale Des Antiquaires De France, 1957.
- Marques de potiers gallo-romains trouvées à Paris et conservées principalement au musée Carnavalet. Paris: Impr. nationale, 1963.
