= Notre-Dame de la Daurade =

Basilica located in Toulouse, France

Coordinates: 43°36′3″N 1°26′23″E

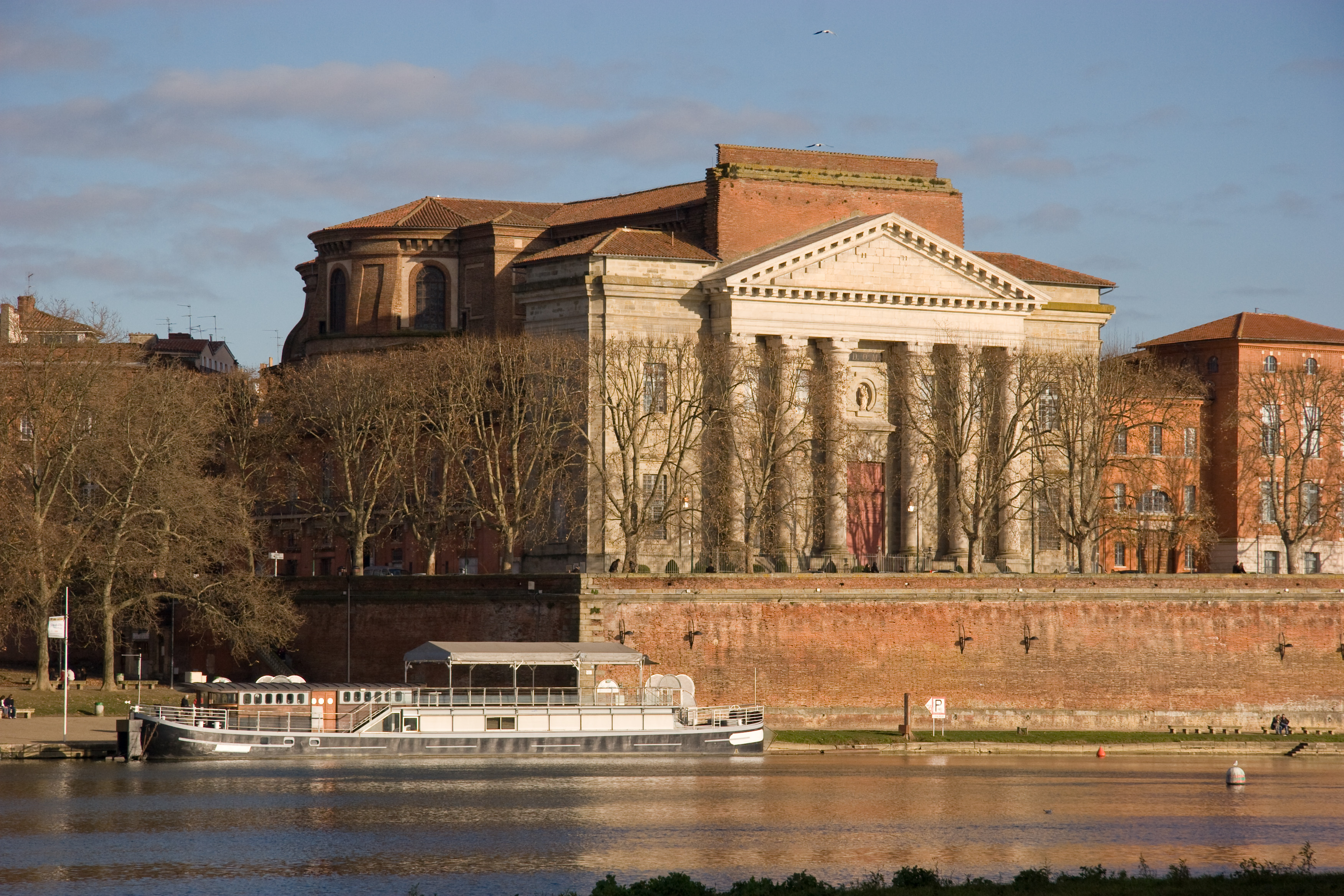
Notre-Dame de la Daurade.

Notre-Dame de la Daurade is a basilica in Toulouse, France. It was established in 410 when Emperor Honorius allowed the conversion of pagan temples to Christianity. The original building of Notre-Dame de la Daurade was a temple dedicated to Apollo.

== History ==
During the 5th or 6th century a church was erected, decorated with golden mosaics; the current name derives from the antique name, “Deaurata”, (Latin: aura, gold). Linguistic evidence from inscriptions that accompanied the mosaics suggest that the church was in use by the Visigoths, who adhered to Arian Christianity, before coming into Catholic hands following the Battle of Vouillé in 507. It became a Benedictine monastery during the 9th century. After a period of decline starting in the 15th century, the basilica was demolished in 1761 to make way for the construction of Toulouse's riverside quays. The buildings were restored and a new church built, but the monastery was closed during the French Revolution, becoming a tobacco factory.

The basilica had housed the shrine of a Black Madonna. The original icon was stolen in the fifteenth century, and its first replacement was burned by Revolutionaries in 1799 on the Place du Capitole. The icon presented today is an 1807 copy of the fifteenth century Madonna. Blackened by the hosts of candles, the second Madonna has been known since the sixteenth century as Notre Dame La Noire.

The current edifice was built during the 19th century.

The church has been listed as a Monument historique by the French Ministry of Culture; its organ has also been classified.

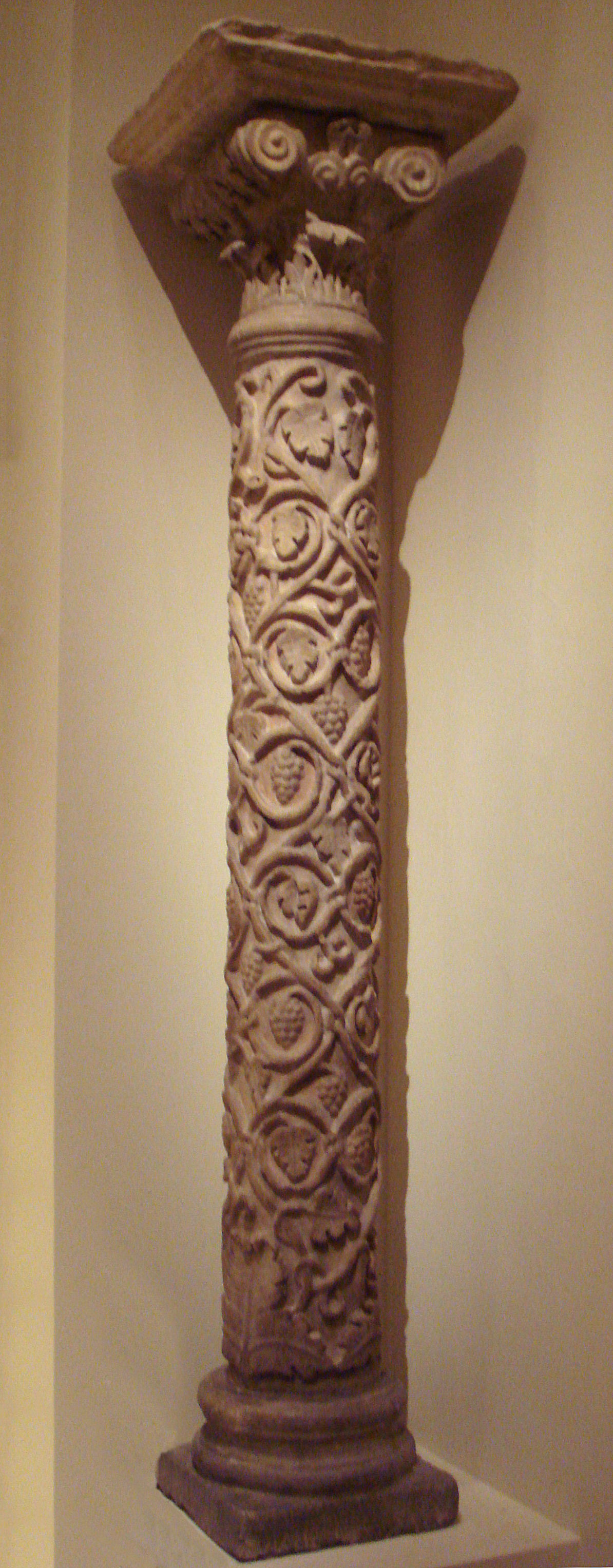
Column from Notre-Dame de la Daurade, 5th century

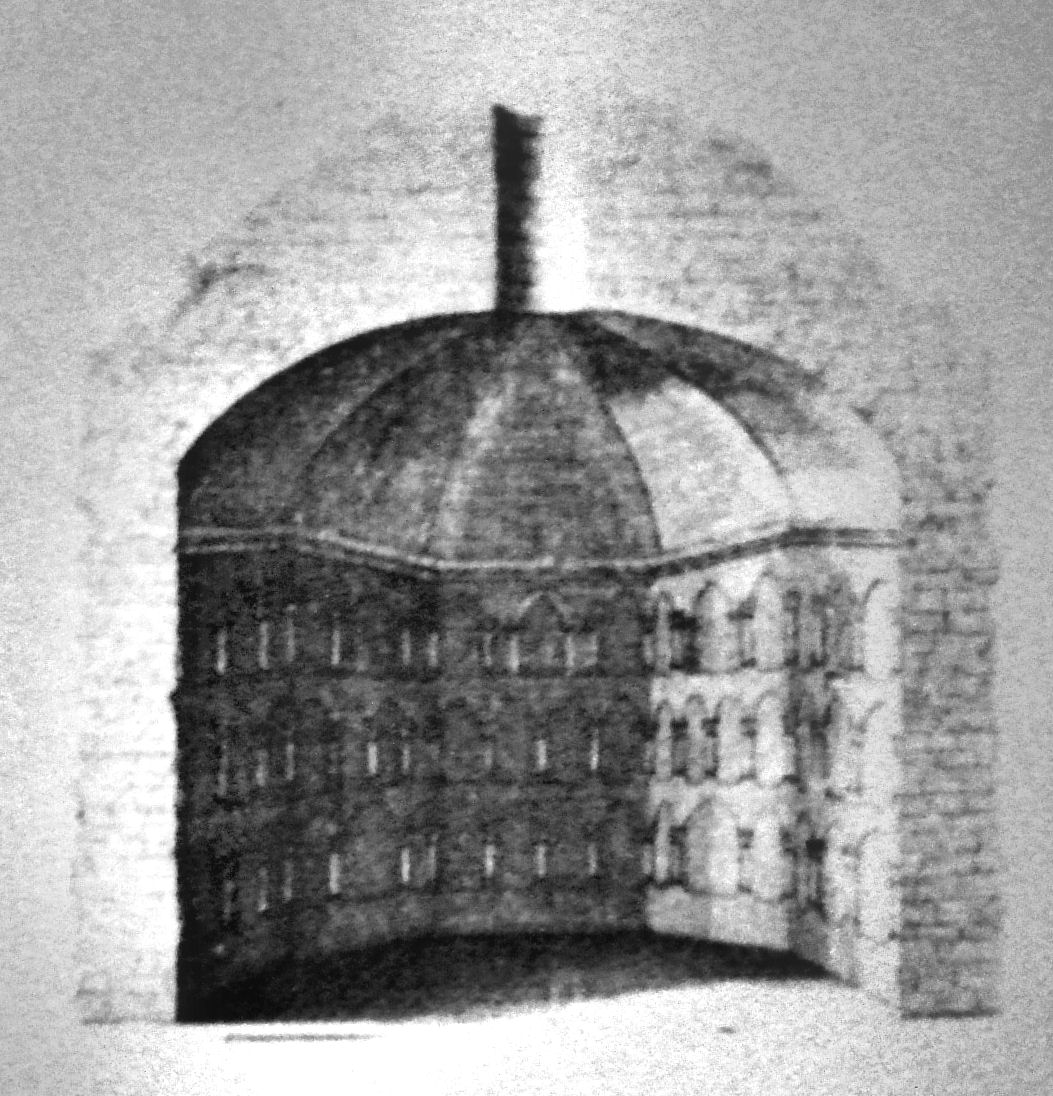
Seven-sided sanctuary of Notre Dame de la Daurade, with niches decorated with columns.

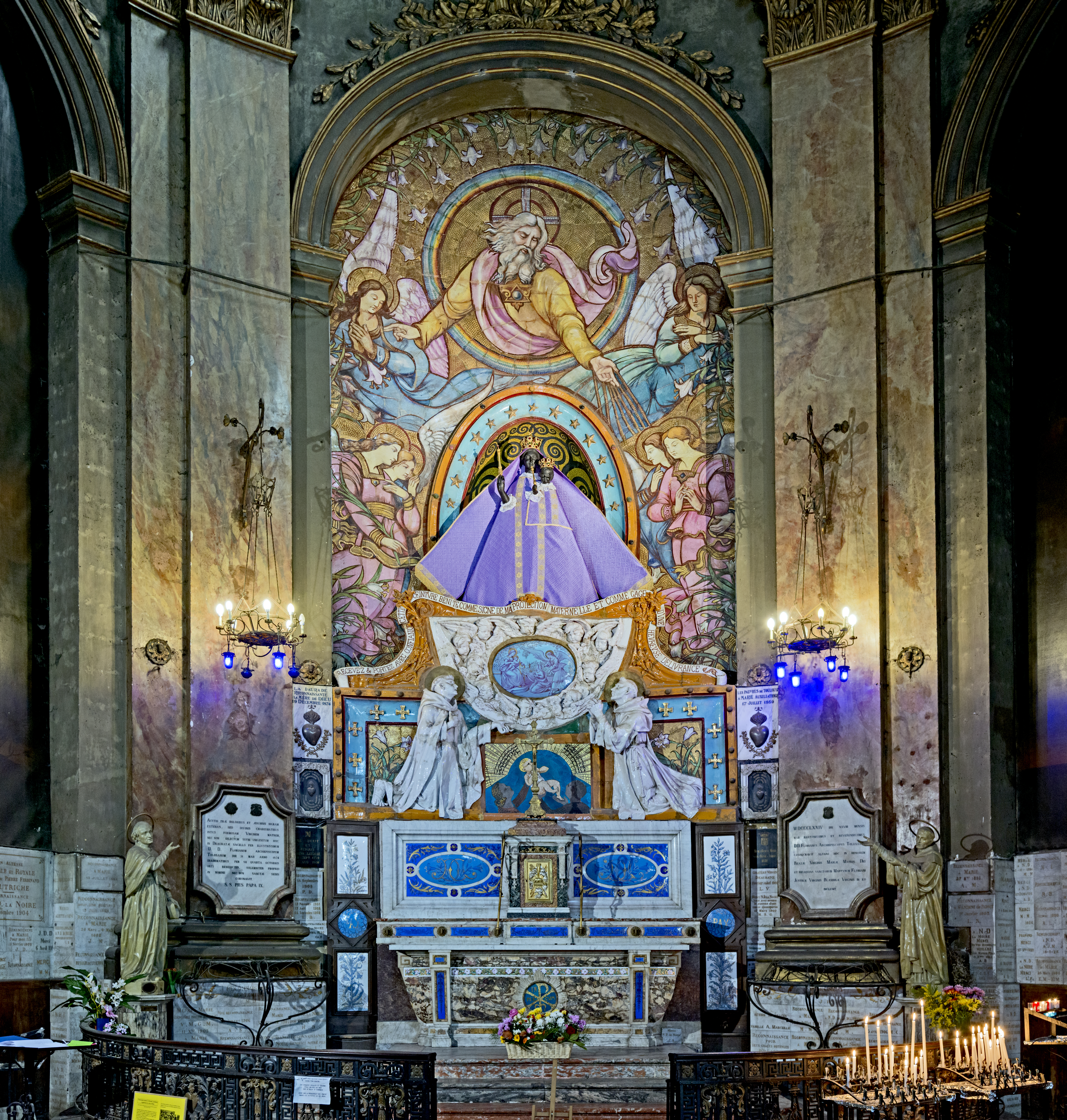
Altar of Black Madonna of Toulouse

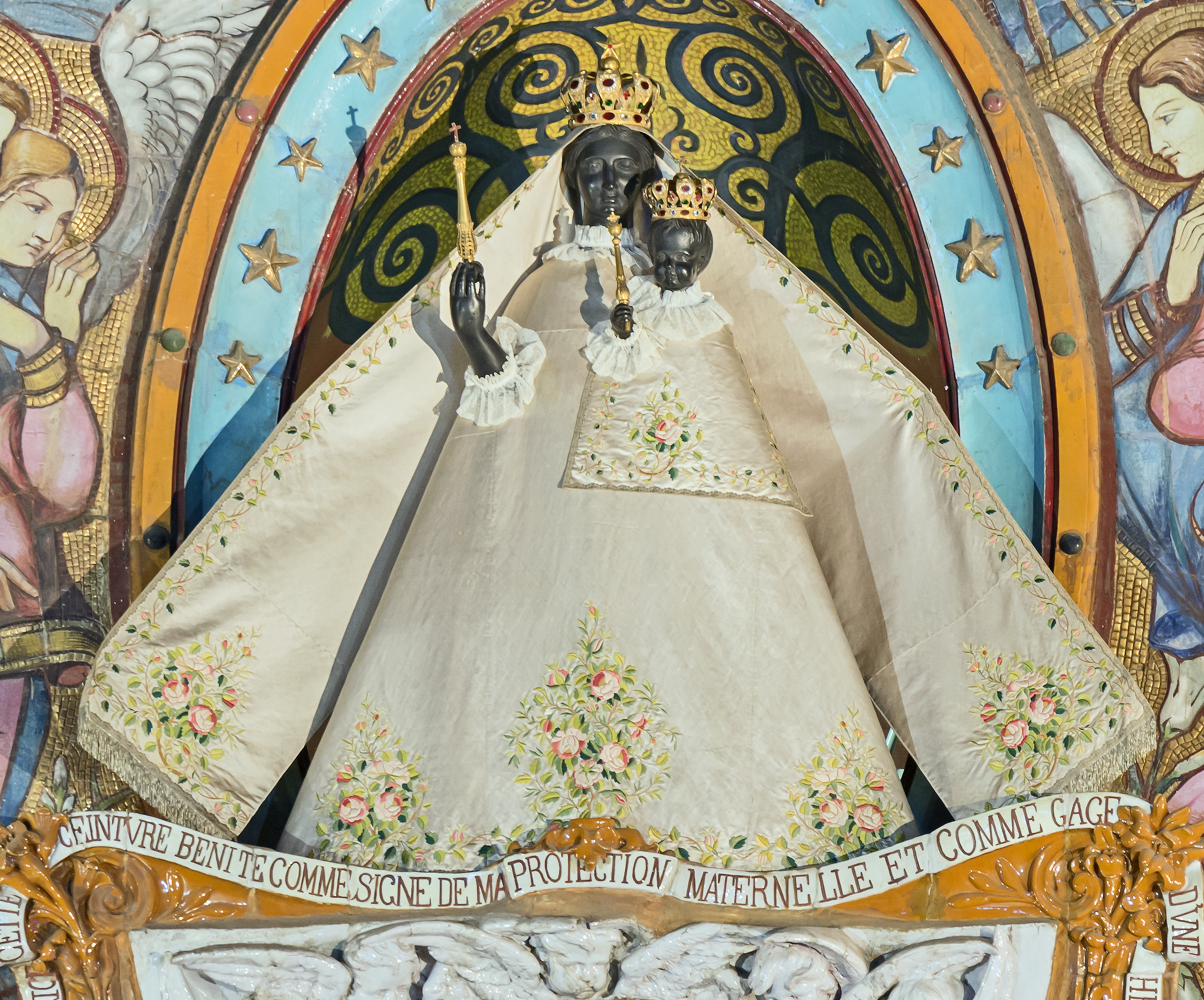
Black Madonna of Toulouse

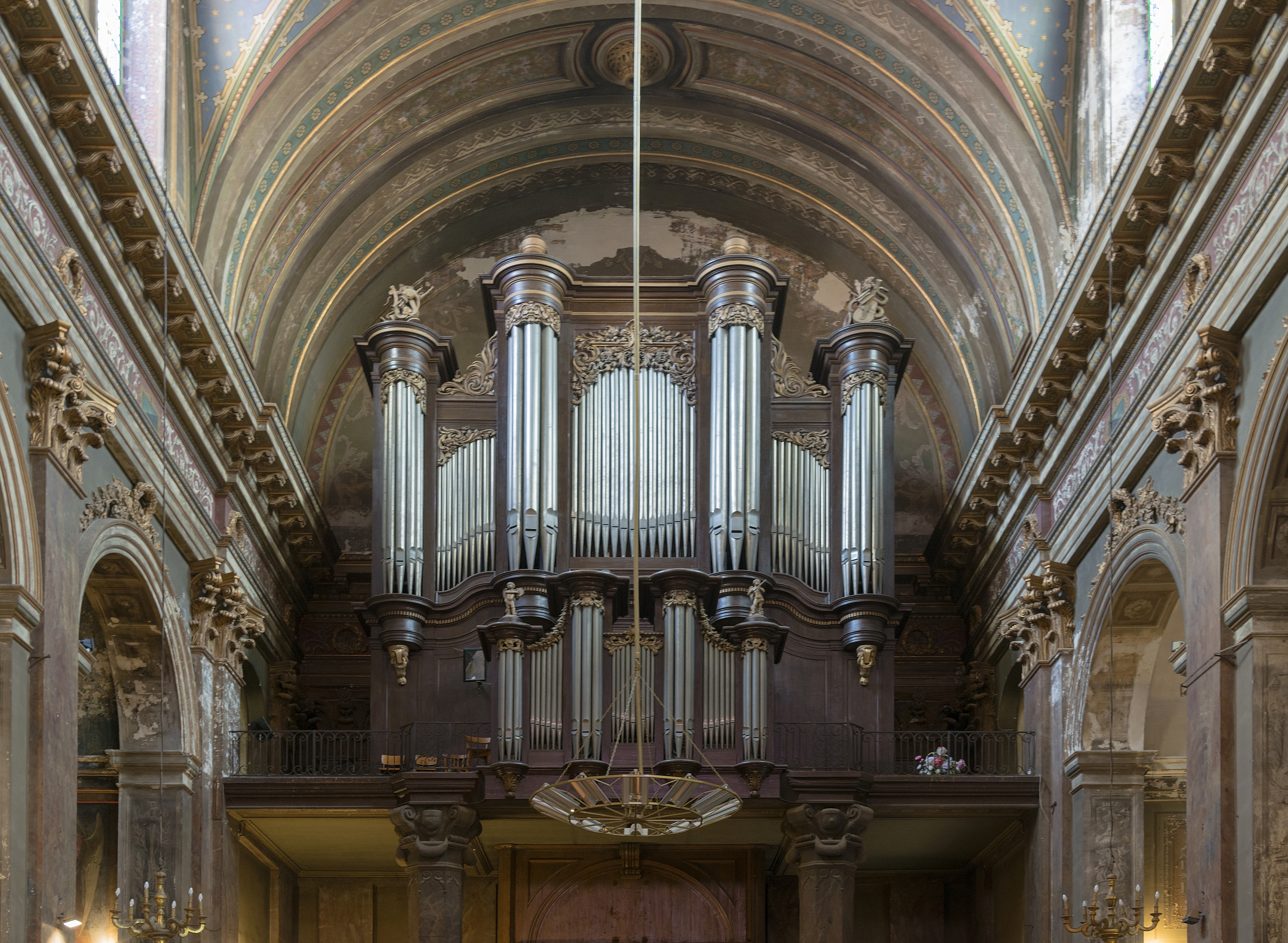
Gallery organ

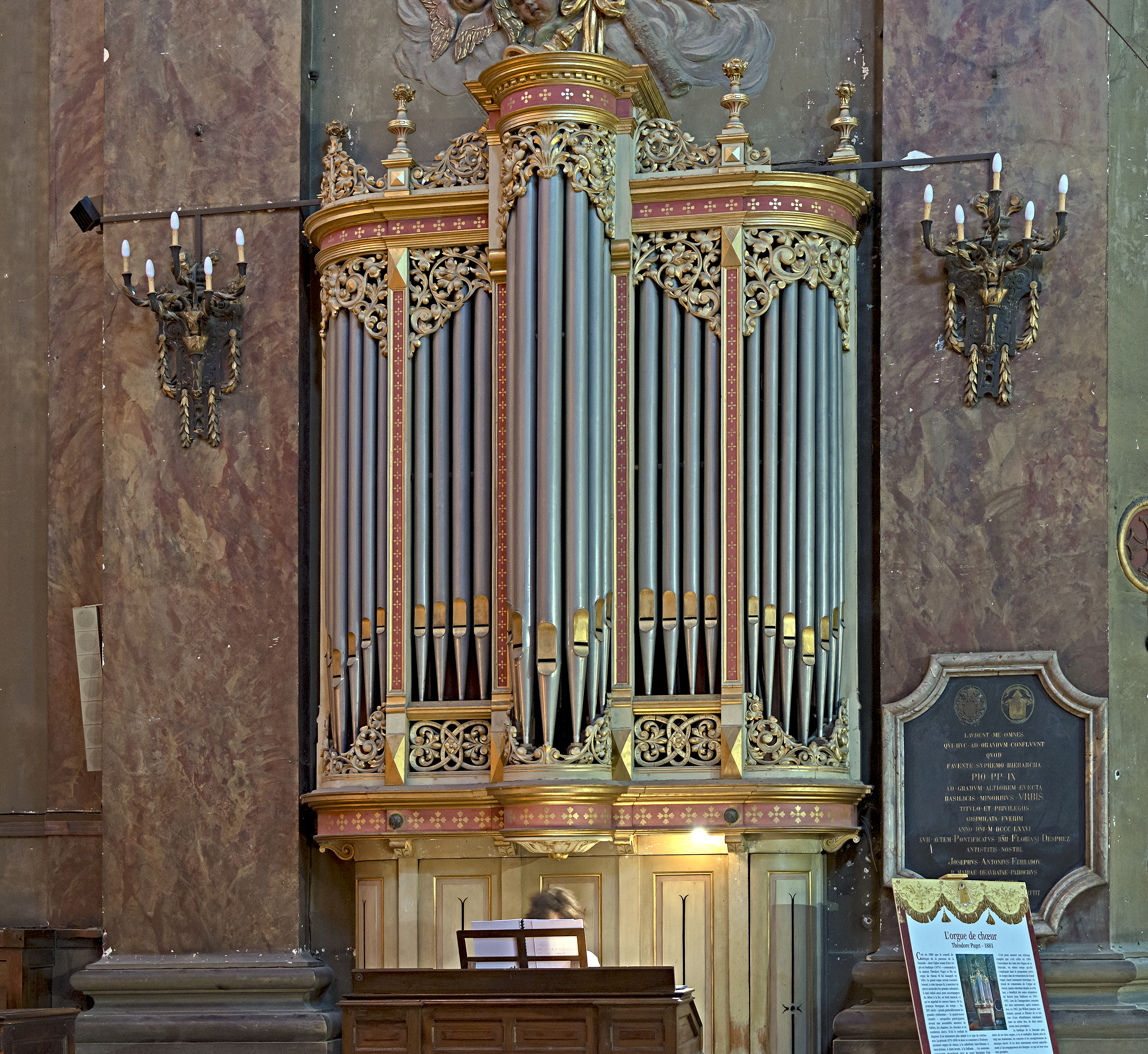
Choir organ

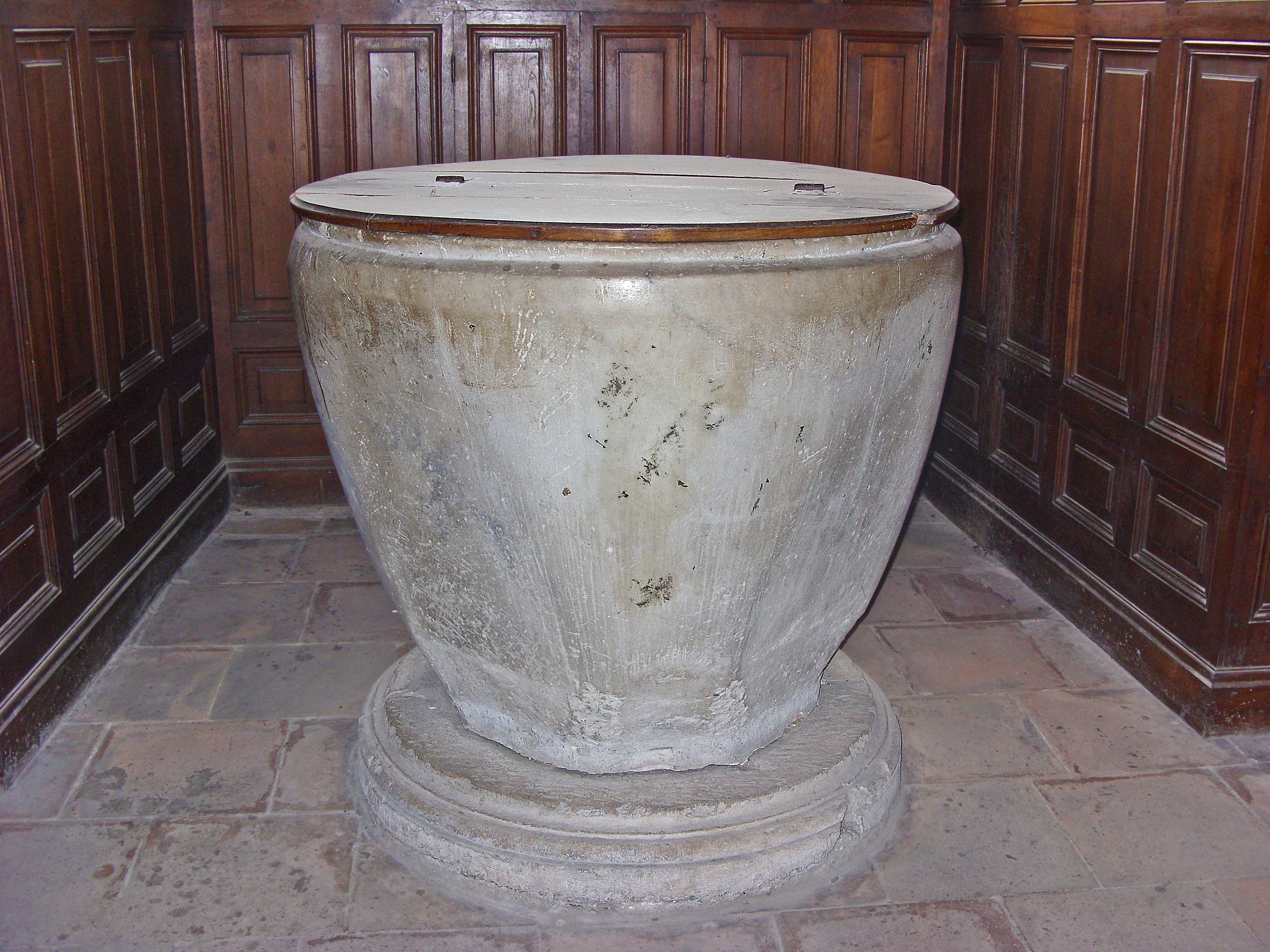
Baptismal font.

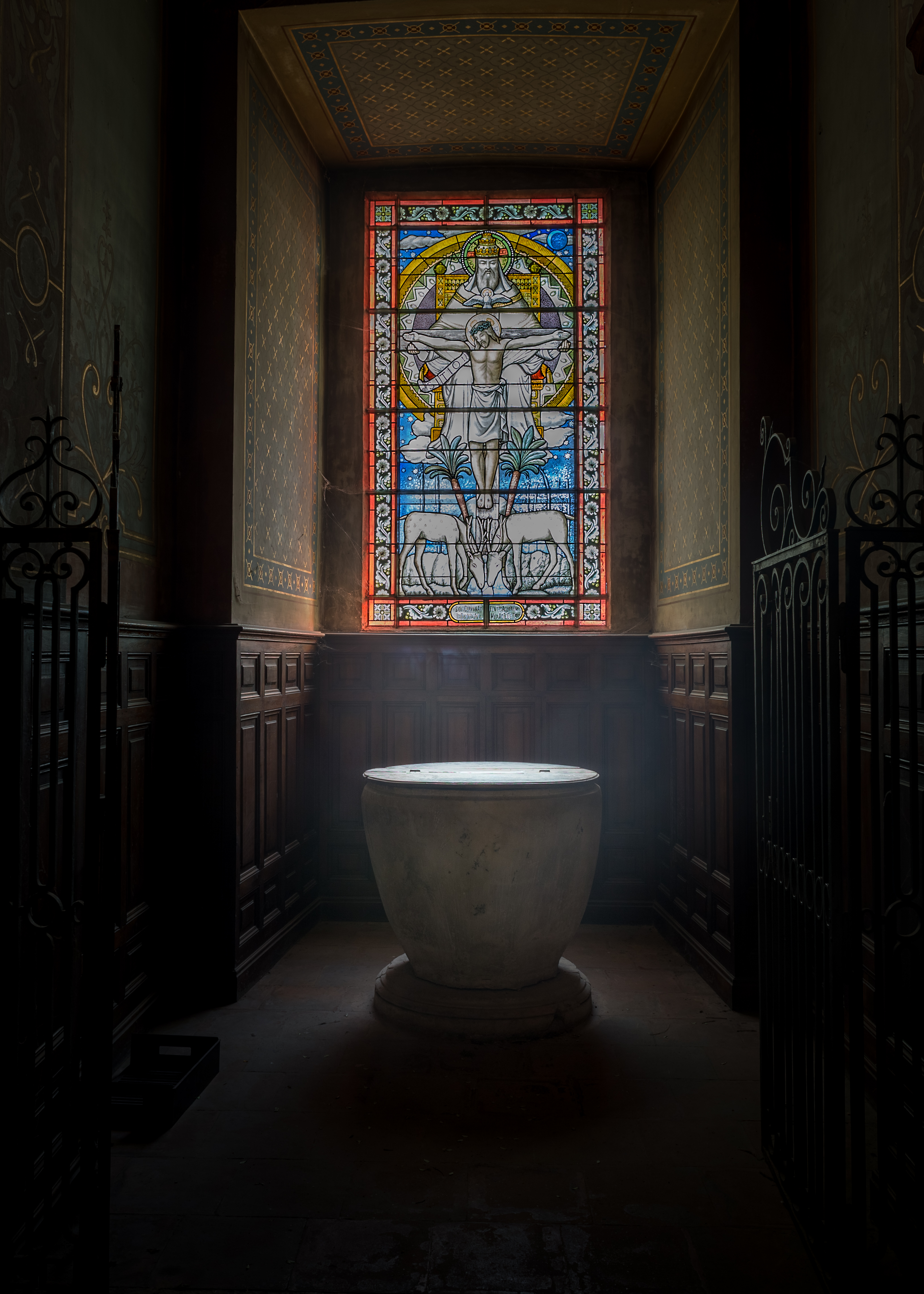
Baptismal font.

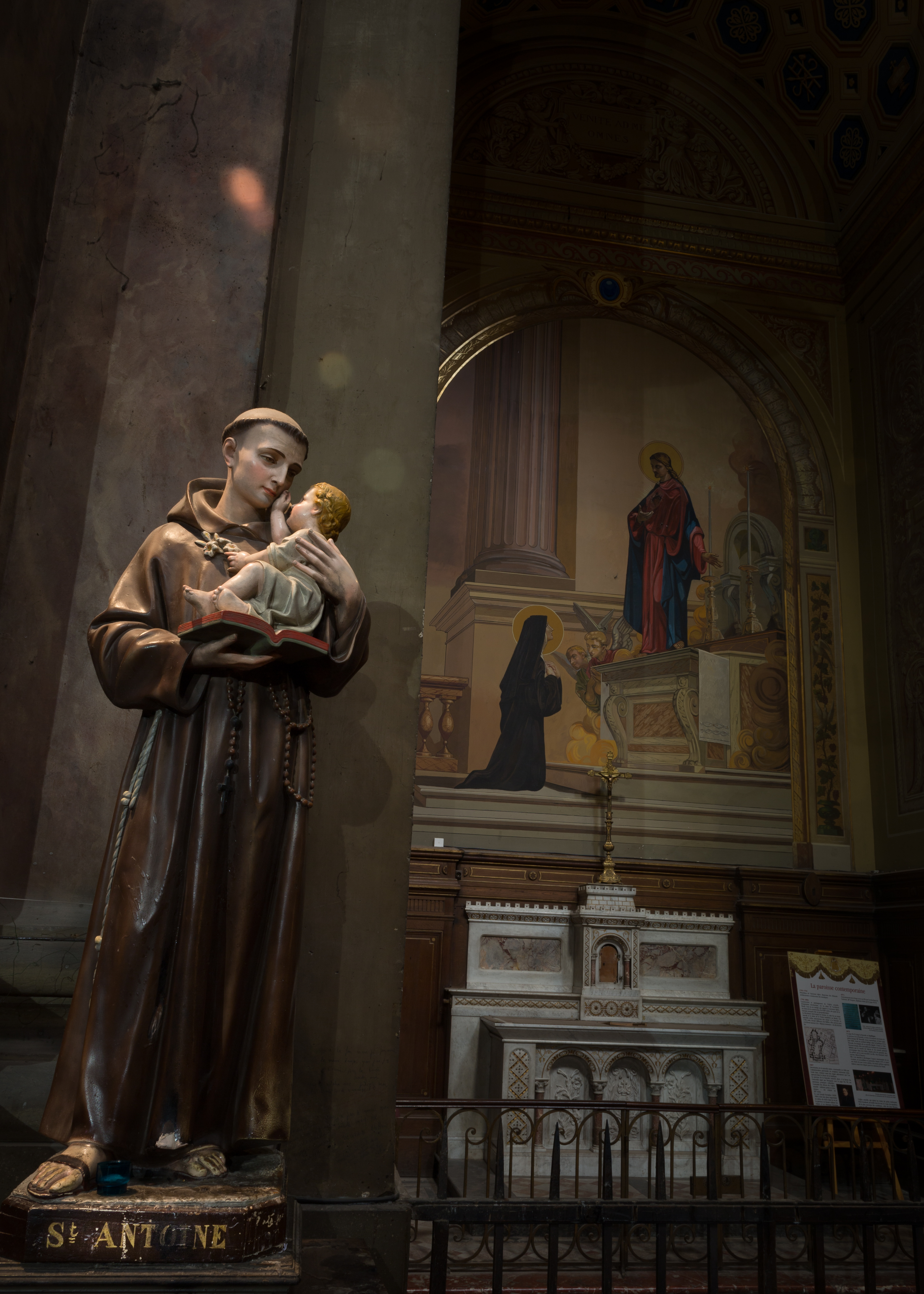
Anthony of Padua

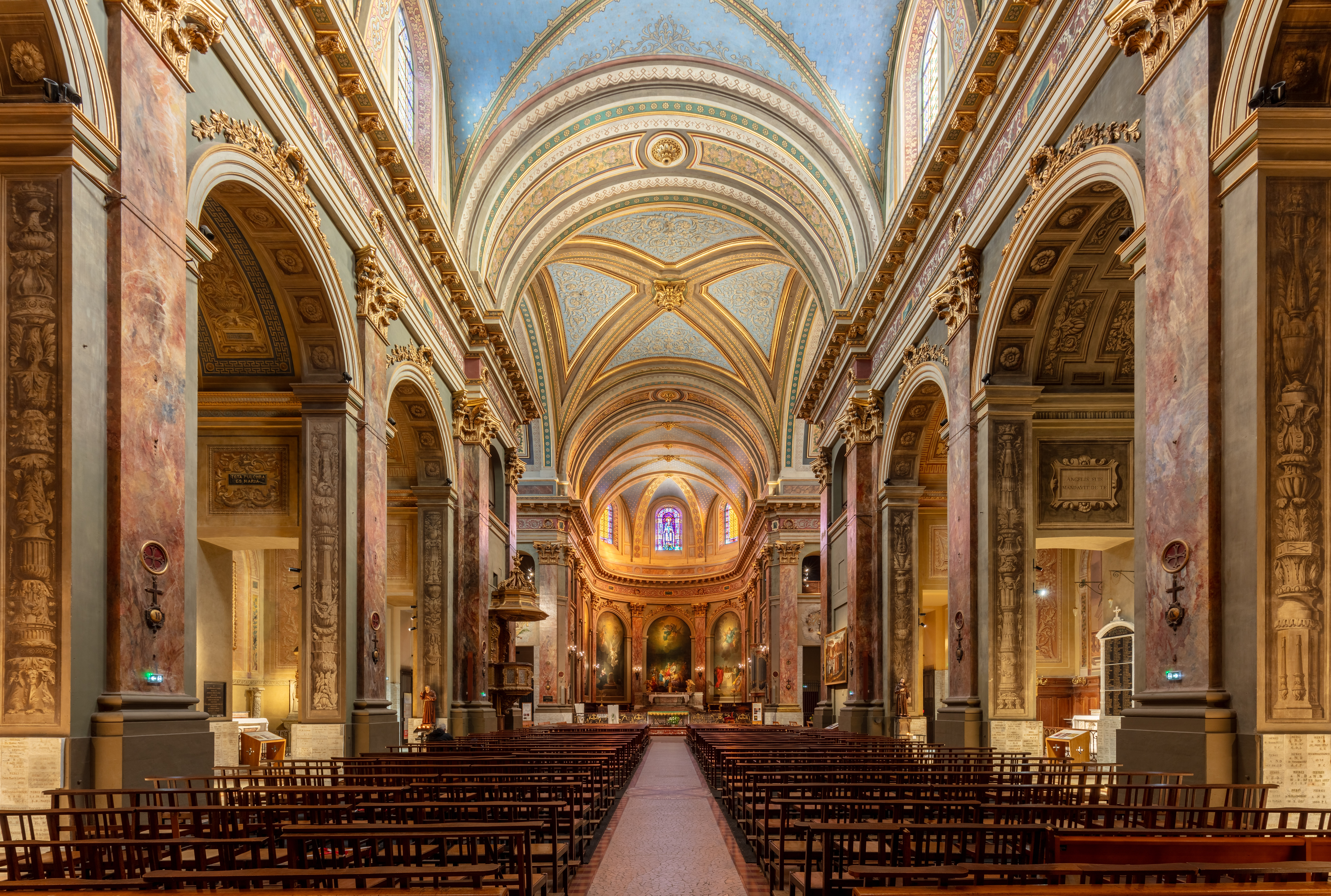
Interior
