= Dhori Mata Tirthalaya =

Shrine of Miraculous Mother of the Coal Mines
- ढ़ोरी माता तीर्थालाय (Dhori Mata Tirthalaya)
- Location within India Location within Jharkhand
- 23.7736782°N 85.9122474°E
- Location: Jarangdih, Bokaro, Jharkhand
- Country: India
- Language(s): Hindi, Santali
- Denomination: Roman Catholic

Architecture
- Groundbreaking: 1956
- Completed: 1983

Administration
- Province: Ranchi
- Diocese: Hazaribag

Clergy
- Bishop: Anand Jojo

Dhori Mata Tirthalaya, also known as the Shrine of Miraculous Mother of the Coal Mines, is a Roman Catholic shrine dedicated to the Virgin Mary. It is located in Jarangdih, Bokaro, in the Indian state of Jharkhand.

== Overview ==
The shrine has a statue of the Virgin Mary with the Baby Jesus. The statue was named Dhori Mata, after the place in which it was found. A large number of people attend the 9-day festival every year that concludes with a Mass (locally called Missa Puja) on the last Sunday of October. Dhori Mata is regarded locally as the patroness of coal miners. The shrine contains numerous paintings of Jesus Christ and is decorated with lamps.

== History ==
On 12 June 1956, the statue of Dhori Mata was accidentally found by a coal field worker named Rupa Satnami from Bilaspur, Chhattisgarh working in the mines of Jarangdih, Bokaro, Jharkhand. While excavating coal, he heard a voice in Hindi say, "Strike gently, I am here." One of the arms of statue of the Virgin Mary had been broken off by Satnami's pickaxe.

In October 1957, the statue of Dhori Mata was placed in St. Anthony's Church in Jarangdih. In May 1964, the statue was transferred from the church to the present shrine location. In December 1964, the statue of Dhori Mata was specially blessed by Pope Paul VI during his pastoral visit to Mumbai. Later in 1967, the statue was sent to Belgium and was found to be made of jackfruit wood and dated to be approximately 400-500 years old. On 30 October 1983, the shrine was formally inaugurated.

The statue was stolen in January 2008, but was recovered the following day.

== See also ==
- Black Madonna
