= Monique Scheer =

American-German historical and cultural anthropologist

Monique Scheer (born in 1967 in Tulsa, Oklahoma) is a historical and cultural anthropologist and professor at the University of Tübingen, Germany, where she also served as vice-president for International Affairs and Diversity from 2016 to 2026.

== Biography ==
Monique Scheer studied history at Stanford University and graduated in 1989. She worked as a desk editor and translations editor at Thieme Medical Publishers in Stuttgart, Germany, between 1990 and 1994. She then studied European ethnology and religion at the University of Tübingen, gaining her master's degree in 2000. She worked as a research scholar at the University of Tübingen in the Collaborative Research Centre on War Experience between 2002 and 2007, completing her doctorate in 2006. She moved to the Max Planck Institute for Human Development, Berlin, Germany in 2008 as a research scholar at its Center for the History of Emotions. She then became assistant professor at the Ludwig Uhland Institute for Historical and Cultural Anthropology at the University of Tübingen in 2011. She has been a full professor since 2014. She was elected vice-president of international affairs in October 2016. In July 2020, she was re-elected for a term of eight years, as vice-president for international affairs and diversity, but stepped down after six, in 2026.

Scheer's research focuses on emotions in religious and political contexts, theory and method in the history of emotions, and the visual and material culture of Christianity in modern Europe. She has investigated the history of German-speaking anthropology and folklore studies, especially during World War I, in addition to ethnic and religious diversity in modern German society. She has been co-editor of the journal Ethnologia Europaea from 2016 to 2020 (with Marie Sandberg). In 2011 she was awarded the Walter de Gruyter Prize of the Berlin-Brandenburg Academy of Sciences and Humanities.

Scheer was awarded an honorary doctorate in November 2025 from the University of Copenhagen, Faculty of Humanities.

== Publications ==
- Enthusiasm: Emotional Practices of Conviction in Modern Germany. Oxford: Oxford University Press, 2020.
- The Public Work of Christmas: Difference and Belonging in Multicultural Societies (edited with Pamela E. Klassen). Montreal: McGill-Queen's University Press, 2019.
- Secular Bodies, Affects and Emotions - European Configurations (edited with Nadia Fadil and Birgitte Schepelern Johansen). London: Bloomsbury, 2019.
- Emotional Lexicons: Continuity and Change in the Vocabulary of Feeling 1700–2000 (with Ute Frevert et al.). New York: Oxford University Press, 2014.
- Out of the Tower. Essays in Culture and Everyday Life (edited with Reinhard Johler, Bernhard Tschofen, Thomas Thiemeyer). Tübingen: TVV, 2013.
- Are Emotions a Kind of Practice (and Is That What Makes Them Have a History)? A Bourdieuan Approach to Understanding Emotion, History and Theory, Vol. 51 (2012), No. 2, pp. 193–220.
- Doing Anthropology in Wartime and War Zones. World War I and the Cultural Sciences in Europe (edited with Reinhard Johler and Christian Marchetti). Bielefeld: transcript, 2010.
- From Majesty to Mystery: Change in the Meanings of Black Madonnas from the Sixteenth to Nineteenth Centuries, American Historical Review Vol. 107 (2002), No. 5, pp. 1412–1440.
