= Kališta =

Kalishta Калишта Kalisht
- Village
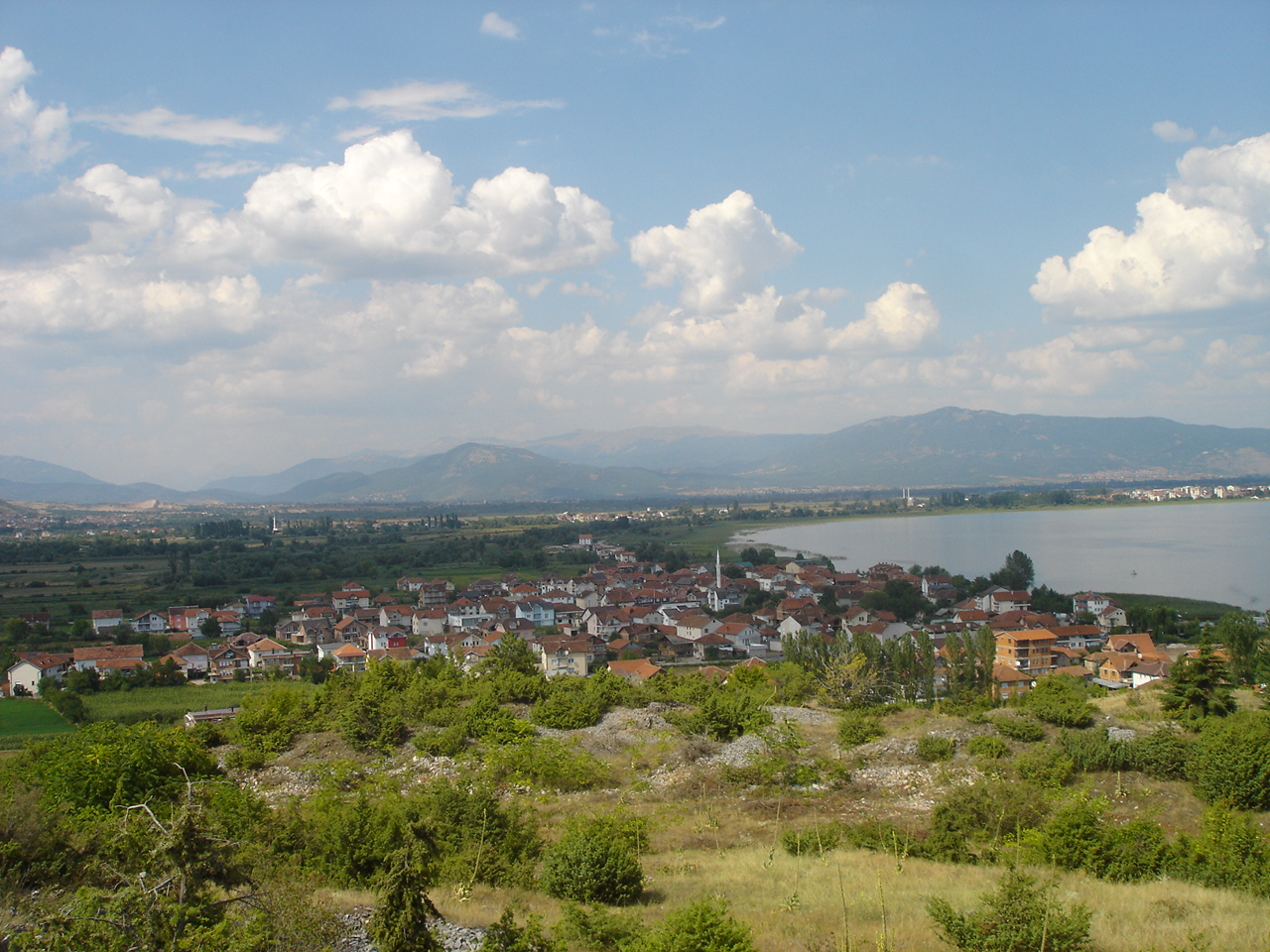
- Kalishta

- Location within North Macedonia
- Coordinates: 41°09′N 20°39′E
- Country: North Macedonia
- Region: Southwestern
- Municipality: Struga

Population (2021)
  - Total: 764
- Time zone: UTC+1 (CET)
  - Summer (DST): UTC+2 (CEST)
- Car plates: SU
- Website: .

Kališta (Macedonian: Калишта, Albanian: Kalisht) is a village in the municipality of Struga, North Macedonia.

== Demographics ==
The village of Kališta is inhabited by Tosks, a subgroup of southern Albanians and speak the Tosk Albanian dialect, as well as ethnic Macedonians.

As of the 2021 census, Kališta had 764 residents with the following ethnic composition:

- Albanians 623
- Macedonians 115
- Persons for whom data are taken from administrative sources 23
- Others 3

According to the 2002 census, the village had a total of 1178 inhabitants. Ethnic groups in the village include:

- Albanians 1079
- Macedonians 95
- Turks
- Vlachs 1
- Serbs 1
- Others 2
