= Château d'Anjony =

Coordinates: 45°03′15″N 2°28′41″E

Interactive map of the Château d'Anjony

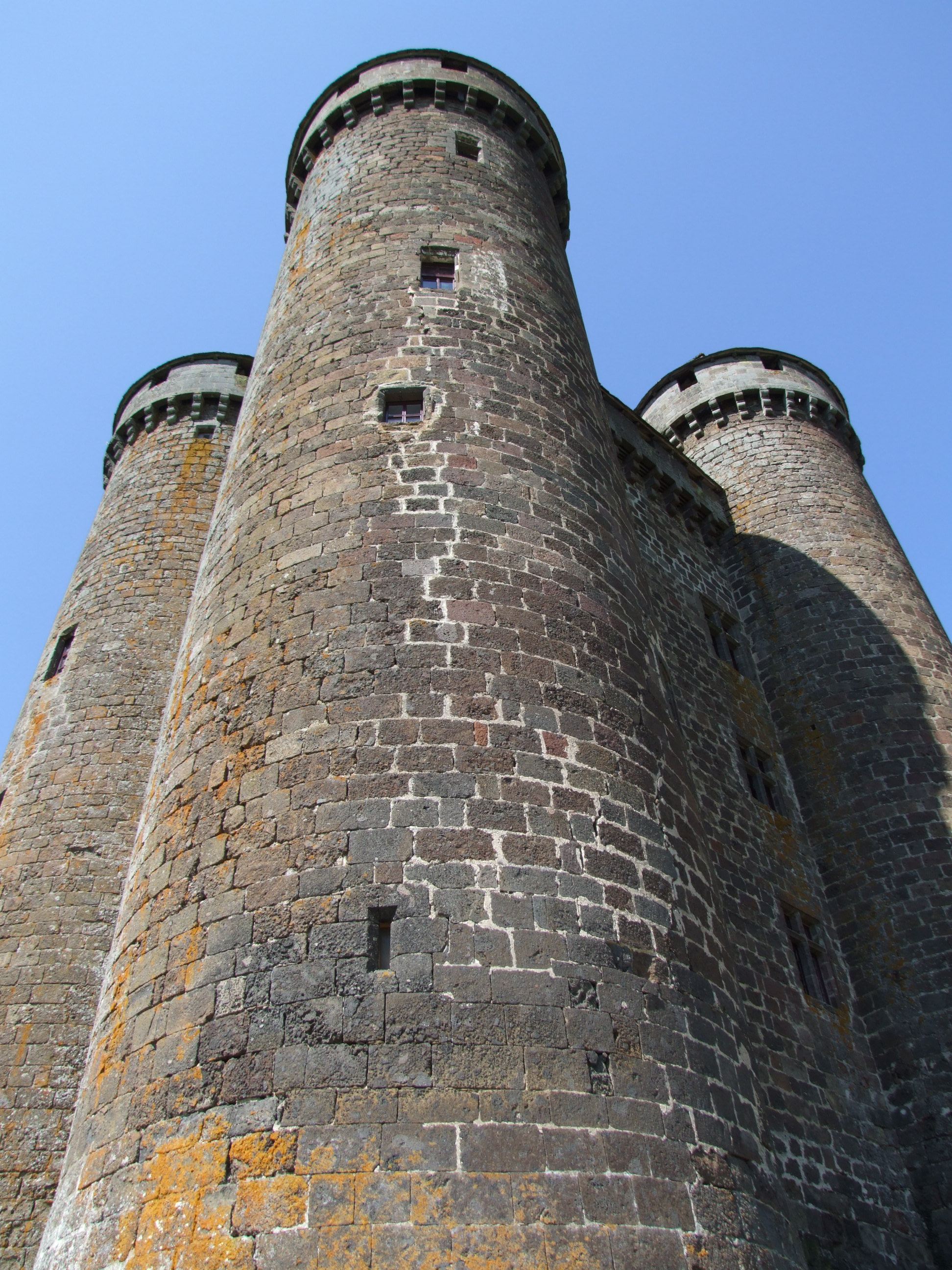
Château d'Anjony

The Château d'Anjony (Occitan: Chastèl d'En Jòni) is a castle in Tournemire in the Cantal département of France.

== History ==
The castle was built in the 15th century by Louis II d'Anjony, companion of Jean de Dunois and Joan of Arc, near to the towers of Tournemire which had been held by his family and the Tournemires in joint fief since 1351. This dual ownership was the cause of three centuries of bloody rivalry between the two families, one of old feudal stock, the other having prospered through commerce and service to royalty. Around 1650, the Tournemires left the area.

The castle and its estate have been classified as a monument historique by the French Ministry of Culture. The castle (excluding the 18th century attached building) was classified in 1942.

== Description ==
The castle, built of reddish basalt, has been described as "one of the most remarkable castles in Upper Auvergne". It is located in a strategic position on the Tournemire promontory and dominates the rich landscape of the Doire valley with its four tall towers, 40 metres (130 ft).

The castle consists of a keep with four corner towers. There is only one room on each floor. During the 18th century, the owners added a small wing in the then fashionable style. The low vaulted cellar in the basement was turned into a vast entrance hall. The main hall on the first floor has a coffered ceiling with three tiers of beams. Throughout the castle are fine furnishings and fittings, including tapestries from Aubusson and Flanders, a tester bed and a reclining seat. The kitchen boasts a massive fireplace. The chapel, located in the southwest tower, has frescoes illustrating the life of Christ. In an alcove is a statue of Our Lady of Anjony, a black virgin and child of painted and gilded wood. The Knights' Hall, on the second floor, has frescoes of Michel of Anjony and his wife, Germaine of Foix, in late 16th century dress. Other frescoes illustrate the legend of the Nine Valiant Knights from a medieval poem. Notable objects in this room include a Florentine table inlaid with ivory, a Mudéjar-style secretaire, engraved silver dishes and various Renaissance objets d'art. The audience chamber on the third floor has diagonal faulting and walls hung with two large tapestries, one a Flemish verdure (hunting scene). The loopholes along the watchpath overlook the Doire valley.

== See also ==
- List of castles in France
