= Tournemire, Cantal =

Commune in Auvergne-Rhône-Alpes, France

Tournemire
- Commune
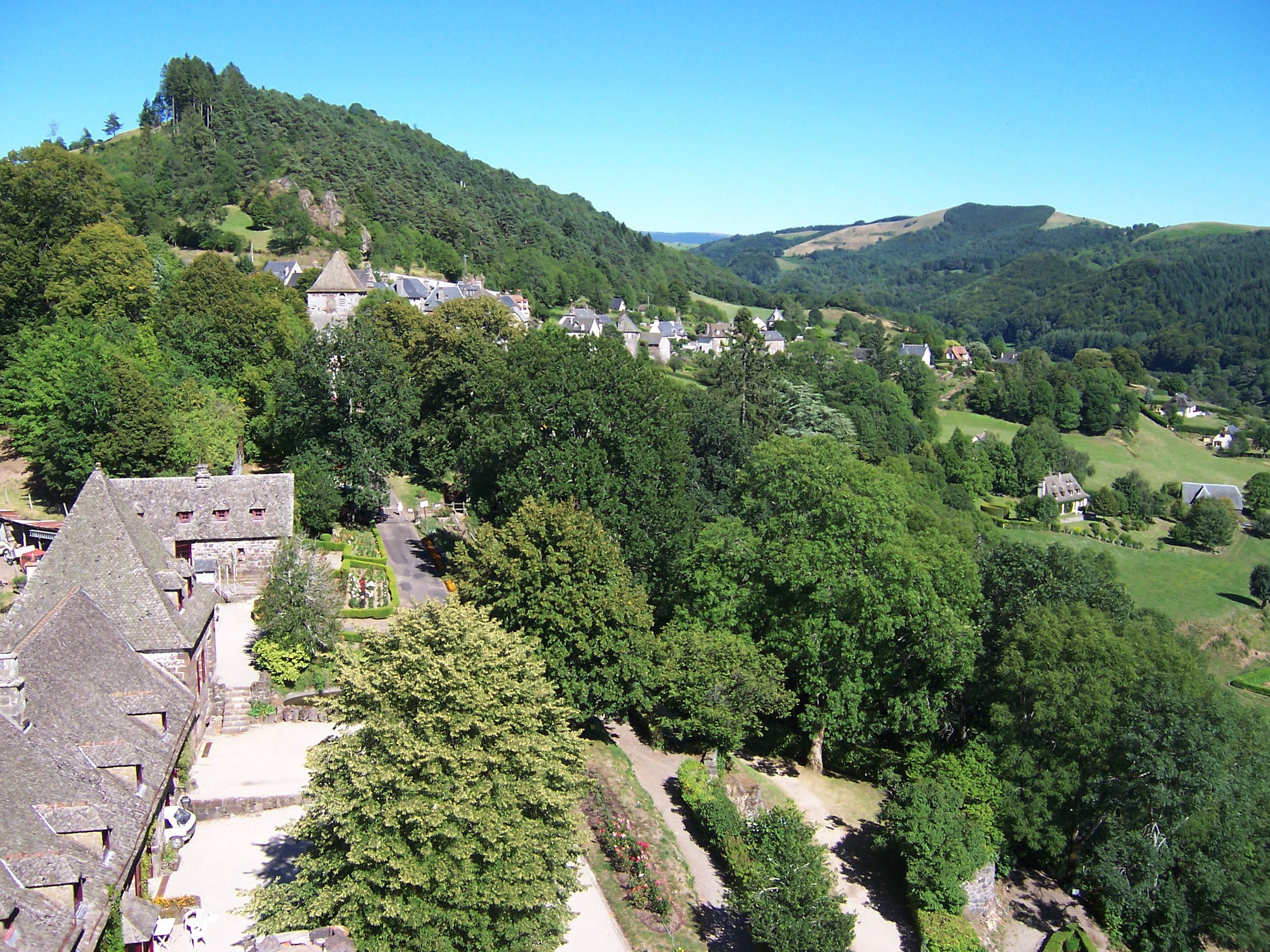
- Tournemire seen from the Château d'Anjony

- Coat of arms
- Location of Tournemire
- Location within France Location within Auvergne-Rhône-Alpes
- Coordinates: 45°03′19″N 2°28′59″E
- Country: France
- Region: Auvergne-Rhône-Alpes
- Department: Cantal
- Arrondissement: Aurillac
- Canton: Naucelles
- Intercommunality: Pays de Salers

Government
  - Mayor (2020–2026): Martine Pani-Poulvellarie
- Area^{1}: 9.68 km^{2} (3.74 sq mi)
- Elevation: 780 m (2,560 ft)
- Highest elevation: 1,046 m (3,432 ft)
- Lowest elevation: 708 m (2,323 ft)
- Population (2023): 116
  - Density: 12.0/km^{2} (31.0/sq mi)
- Time zone: UTC+01:00 (CET)
  - Summer (DST): UTC+02:00 (CEST)
- INSEE/Postal code: 15238 /15310
- ^{1} French Land Register data, which excludes lakes, ponds, glaciers > 1 km^{2} (0.386 sq mi or 247 acres) and river estuaries.

Tournemire (French pronunciation: [tuʁnəmiʁ]; Occitan: Tornamira) is a commune in the Cantal department in south-central France. It is a member of Les Plus Beaux Villages de France (The Most Beautiful Villages of France) Association.

== Population ==
Historical population
Year	Pop.	±% p.a.
1968	299	—
1975	214	−4.67%
1982	183	−2.21%
1990	163	−1.44%
1999	145	−1.29%
2007	142	−0.26%
2012	132	−1.45%
2017	126	−0.93%
2023	116	−1.37%
Source: INSEE

== See also ==
- Communes of the Cantal department
