= Koprivna, Črna na Koroškem =

Koprivna
- Location in Slovenia
- Coordinates: 46°27′43.85″N 14°44′41.84″E
- Country: Slovenia
- Traditional region: Carinthia
- Statistical region: Carinthia
- Municipality: Črna na Koroškem

Area
  - Total: 29.67 km^{2} (11.46 sq mi)
- Elevation: 1,068.7 m (3,506 ft)

Population (2020)
  - Total: 143
  - Density: 4.82/km^{2} (12.5/sq mi)

Koprivna (pronounced [kɔˈpɾiːu̯na]) is a dispersed settlement in the Upper Meža Valley in the hills west of Črna na Koroškem in the Carinthia region of northern Slovenia on the border with Austria.

The parish church in the settlement is dedicated to Saint James and belongs to the Roman Catholic Archdiocese of Maribor. It was built in the 14th century and has 16th- and 19th-century furnishings in its interior. There is a second church in the northern part of the settlement belonging to the same parish. It is dedicated to Saint Anne and originally dates to the 15th century, but the nave was rebuilt in the 17th century. It has an altar with a rare statue of the Black Madonna.
