= Patron saints of Poland =

Historical figures of catholicism

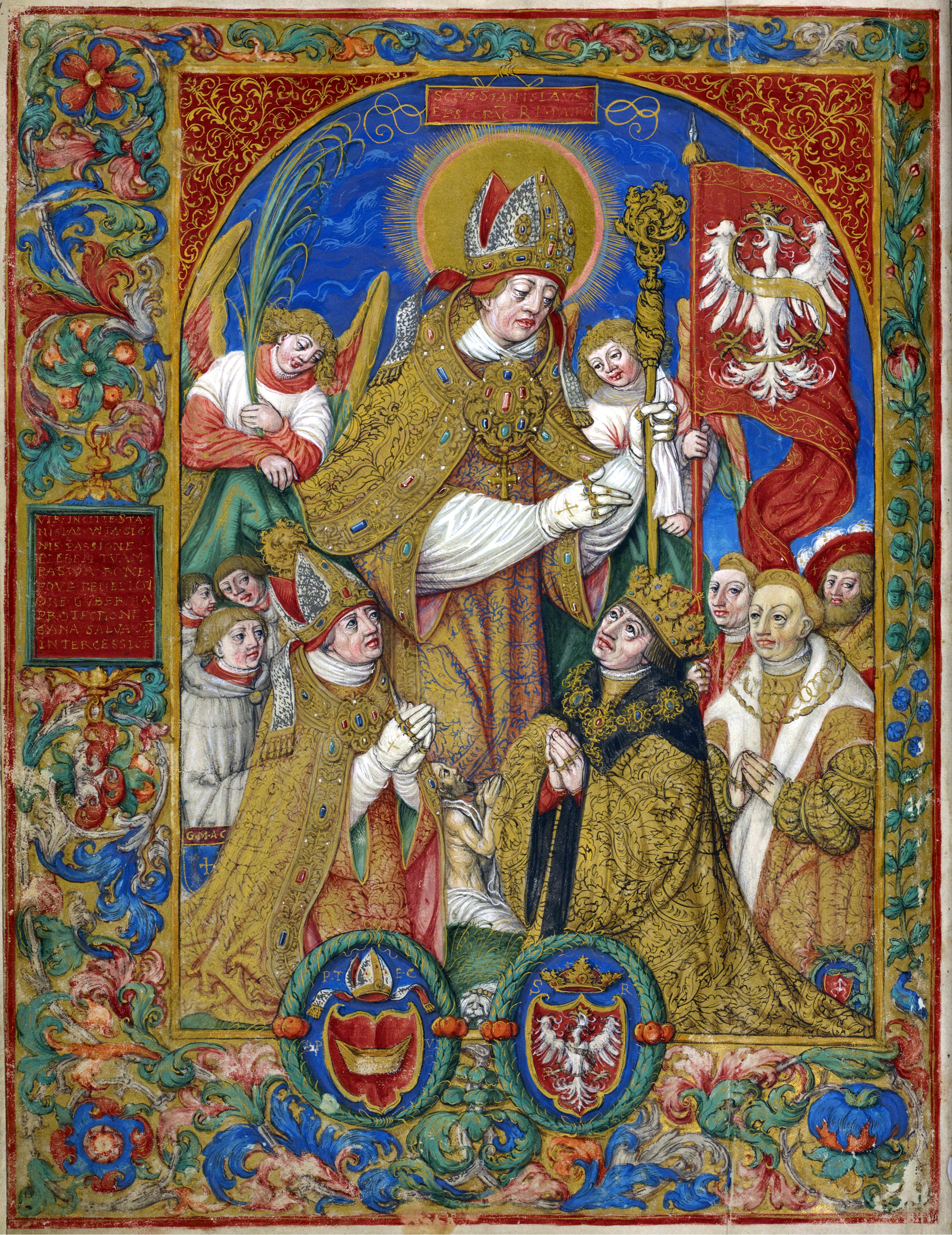
A 16th-century illumination of Saint Stanislaus

The Catholic Church venerates five patron saints of Poland. The primary patron saints are the Blessed Virgin Mary the Queen of Poland, Saint Adalbert, and Saint Stanislaus of Szczepanów. The secondary patron saints are the Jesuits Saint Stanislaus Kostka and Saint Andrew Bobola. Historically, several other saints also were considered patrons of Poland.

== Primary ==
- The Most Holy Virgin Mary, Queen of Poland (Najświętsza Maryja Panna, Królowa Polski)
  - Bogurodzica ("Mother of God"), dating back to the 13th century, plays the role of Poland's first national anthem
  - In the 14th century, Grzegorz of Sambor names the Blessed Virgin Mary "the queen of Poland and the Poles"
  - 1 April 1655, King John Casimir proclaims the Blessed Virgin Mary the patroness saint of his realm (see: Lwów Oath)
  - 8 September 1717, coronation of the icon of Our Lady of Częstochowa with papal crowns
  - 1920, Pope Benedict XV declares 3 May a solemnity of the Blessed Virgin Mary the Queen of Poland
  - 1962, Pope John XXIII declares the Blessed Virgin Mary the Queen of Poland a principal patroness saint of Poland
- Saint Adalbert (święty Wojciech; c. 956–997)
- Saint Stanislaus of Szczepanów (święty Stanisław Szczepanowski; 1030–1079)

== Secondary ==
- Saint Stanislaus Kostka (święty Stanisław Kostka; 1550–1568)
- Saint Andrew Bobola (święty Andrzej Bobola; 1591–1657)

== Historical ==
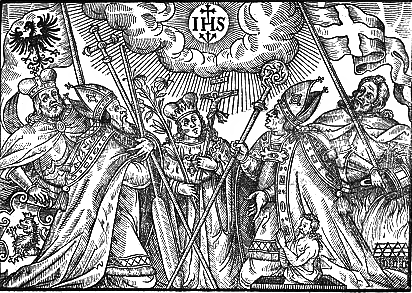
A 17th-century woodcut of five historical Polish patron saints venerating the Christogram; left to right: Wenceslaus, Adalbert, Casimir, Stanislaus, and Florian

- Saint Florian of Lorch (święty Florian; died c. 304)
- Saint Wenceslaus (święty Wacław; c. 907–953)
- Saint Hedwig of Silesia (święta Jadwiga Śląska; 1174–1243)
- Saint Hyacinth (święty Jacek; c. 1200–1257)
- Blessed Bronislava (błogosławiona Bronisława; c. 1200–1259)
- Saint Kinga (święta Kinga; 1224–1292)
- Saint Jadwiga the Queen (święta Jadwiga Królowa; c. 1373/4–1399)
- Saint John Cantius (święty Jan Kanty; 1390–1473)
- Servant of God Isaiah Boner (sługa Boży Izajasz Boner; c. 1400–1471)
- Saint John of Dukla (święty Jan z Dukli; 1414–1484)
- Blessed Ladislaus of Gielniów (błogosławiony Władysław z Gielniowa; c. 1440–1505)
- Saint Casimir the Prince (święty Kazimierz Królewicz; 1458–1484)
- Saint Josaphat Kuntsevich (święty Jozafat Kuncewicz; c. 1580–1623), Greek Catholic

== See also ==
- List of saints of Poland
