= Hacımimi =

Neighborhood in Beyoğlu district, Istanbul, Turkey

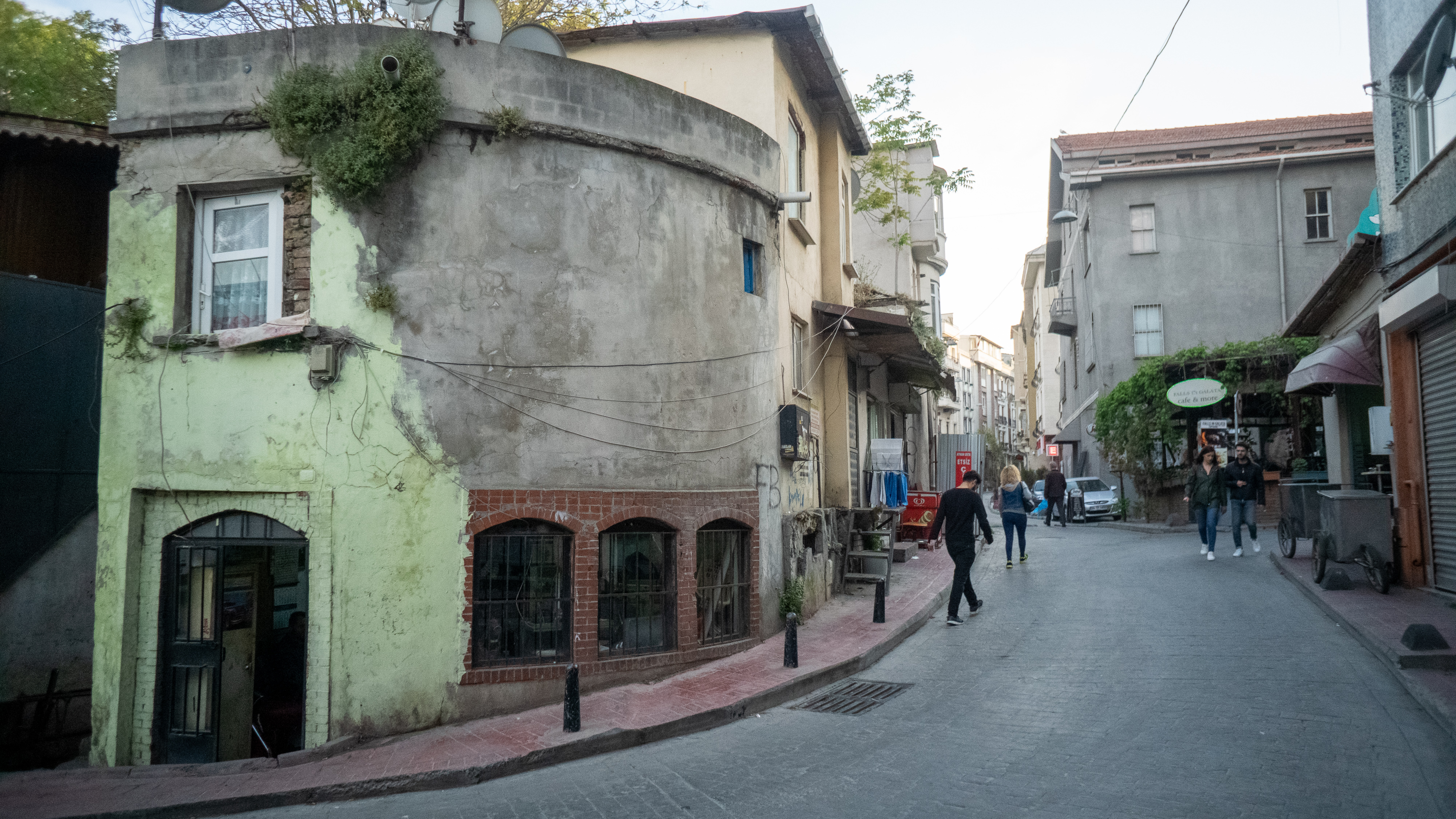
street in Hacımimi

Hacımimi is a neighborhood (mahalle) in the Beyoğlu District of Istanbul, Turkey. Its population is 1230, and its surface area is 9.2 hectares. The neighborhood is located on a slope descending toward the Bosporus, with streets arranged more or less in a grid. The neighborhood contains many historic structures.

== Location ==
The neighborhood is bordered on the north by the Şahkulu and Tomtom neighborhoods, on the east by the Firuzağa neighborhood, on the south by the Kemankeş Karamustafa Paşa neighborhood, and on the west by the Müeyyedzade neighborhood. The neighborhood lies within the larger quarter (semt) of Tophane.

== Name ==
The neighborhood takes its name from the Hacımimi Mosque, built by El Hac Mehmet Çelebi (Hacı Mimi).

== Historic sites ==
- Karabaş Mustafa Ağa Mosque, built in the 16th century by Babüssaade Ağası Karabaş Mustafa, rebuilt in 1957 (or 1961-62)
- Hacımimi Mosque, built in the 16th century by El Hac Mehmet Çelebi (Hacı Mimi), rebuilt in 1959
- Crimean Memorial Church, an Anglican church, construction begun in 1858
- Getronagan Armenian High School, opened as a school for Ottoman Armenian boys in 1886
- Doğan Apartment Building, constructed probably between 1892 and 1894-95 in a "neo-baroque" style, with "comfortable" features, reportedly on the site of an old "Karim" (Karaite Jewish) cemetery
- Galata Greek School, opened as a school for Ottoman Greek children in 1910, officially closed as a school in 2015, restored and opened as a cultural center in 2023
- St. John Turkish Orthodox Church
- Saint Gregory the Illuminator Church of Galata (Surp Krikor Lusavoriç Armenian Church)

== Other important features ==
- Kemeraltı Avenue, a wide street running southwest to northeast through the neighborhood; named after the arch of a monastery next to St. Benoit Church that spanned the street until a fire in 1771 (literally in Turkish: kemer, "arch" + alt, "under")
- Tophane Park
