= Penrose Park =

Penrose Park may refer to:

- Penrose Park, a park in Penrose, Arlington, Virginia, United States
- Penrose Park, a park in Penrose, St. Louis, Missouri, United States
- Penrose Park Recreation Park, Silverton, New South Wales, Australia
- Shrine of Our Lady of Mercy, Penrose Park, also known as Penrose Park, a Catholic shrine in the Southern Highlands of New South Wales
