= Giulio Mancinelli =

Jesuit missionary

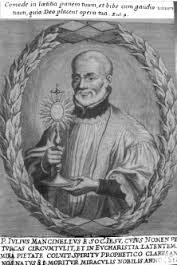
- 1677 painting of Giulio Mancinelli published in Vita magni servi Dei P. Julii Mancinelli
- Born: 13 October 1537; Macerata
- Died: 1618
- Other names: Julius Mancinellus
- Occupation: Jesuit missionary

Giulio Mancinelli (Latin: Julius Mancinellus) (1537–1618) was 16th and 17th century Jesuit missionary. In 1583 he founded the first Jesuit mission in Ottoman held Istanbul.

== Early life ==
Mancinelli was born to a noble family. He joined the Jesuits in 1558 and in 1566 was a novice in the first novitiate house in Rome.

== Missionary appointments ==
Mancinelli was a missionary in Bosnia and Dalmatia. Mancinellus was the head of a Jesuit mission to Istanbul established by the Pope in 1583. They held their services in the Church of Saint Benoit and opened their schools with the support of French and Venetian ambassadors.

In the period between 1585 and 1587 Mancinelli traveled from Constantinople through Wallachia and Moldova, visited Lwów (then in the Crown of the Kingdom of Poland and the Grand Duchy of Lithuania, now in Ukraine, and in 1586 he stayed in Kraków, Crown of the Kingdom of Poland and the Grand Duchy of Lithuania where for a short period he was the tutor of Andrzej Gembicki, a suffragan of Kraków. Mancinelli is associated with the history of the cult of The Most Holy Virgin Mary, Queen of Poland.

He had an apparition of Our Lady. Mary instructed him to call her the Queen of Poland. The news of this revelation began to spread the cult of the Queen of Poland Assumed into heaven. These revelations were distributed by the great Lithuanian chancellor Albrecht Radziwiłł from Nieśwież, where he was supported by St. Andrzej Bobola, later the author of the text of the Lwów Oath.

Having journeyed as far as Muscovy, he then returned to Italy via Vienna, where he spent a few months.

In 1592 he was sent to Algiers, in response to a request made to the Jesuits by the government of Naples, in order to redeem the Christian slaves: he wrote a memorial of this journey in Morea (Rome, Archivum Romanum Societatis Iesu, Vitae, 46, cf. 68–83) and in" Observations about redeeming Christian slaves from Servitude to Unbelievers" (ibid., Vitae, 51, cc. 43r-45r). He experienced a supernatural ecstasy during the trip—saints and angels appeared to him to reassure him about the positive outcome of the mission to Moldova---and he recorded his observations.

In 1608, he was on mission in England and according to his own testimonies had visions of angels. In his old age he was regularly consulted by young men who traveled to England hoping to bring it back to union with Rome.

== Sources ==
- Fabre, Pierre-Antoine (2008). Escrituras de la modernidad: los jesuitas entre cultura retórica y cultura científica. Universidad Iberoamericana. ISBN 978-607-417-030-6.
- Frazee, Charles A. (2006) [1983]. Catholics and Sultans: The Church and the Ottoman Empire 1453-1923. Cambridge: Cambridge University Press. ISBN 9780521027007.
- Coulton, G.G. (1950). Five Centuries of Religion. CUP. p. 750. GGKEY:881G3EASSLN.
- Stefania Tutino, “Historical Authenticity and the Expanding Horizons of the Seventeenth-Century Catholic Church”, The Journal of Modern History 92 (2020), 1–39
- Ovidiu Olar, “Giulio Mancinelli, SJ (†1618) and his Journey across Wallachia and Moldavia”, in The Manifold Faces of the East. Western Images of the Post-Byzantine Christian World in the Age of Reformation, Boston-Leiden, Brill, 2024, pp. 231–263
- Silvia Notarfonso, “Una porta para Turquia”: the Society of Jesus and the Republic of Ragusa (1559–1612)”, Jesuit Educational Quarterly (JEQ), 2nd ser., 1, no. 2 (2025), pp. 353–374.
