= Our Lady of Częstochowa-St Casimir Parish =

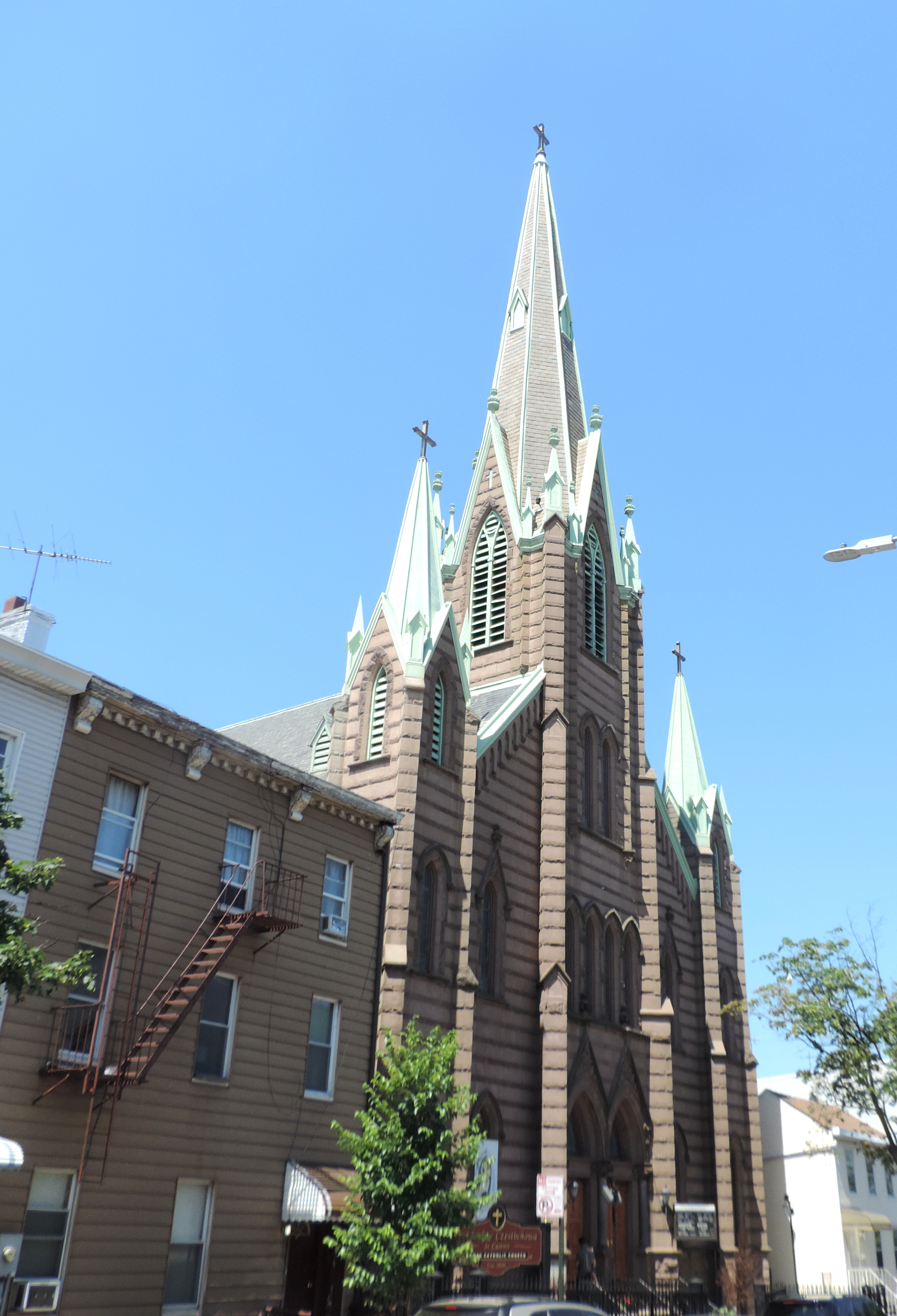
- Our Lady of Częstochowa-St Casimir Parish
- 40°39′40.6″N 73°59′53.7″W
- Location: 183 25th Street, Brooklyn, New York
- Country: United States
- Denomination: Catholic Church
- Website: ourladyofczestochowa.com

History
- Founded: October 2, 1896
- Founder: Polish immigrants
- Dedication: Black Madonna of Częstochowa
- Dedicated: November 18, 1904

Administration
- Division: Cathedral Basilica of St. James (Brooklyn)
- District: Eastern Pastoral Region
- Province: Brooklyn
- Archdiocese: Brooklyn

Clergy
- Archbishop: Seán Patrick O'Malley OFM Cap
- Bishop: Nicholas Anthony DiMarzio 2003-present
- Vicar(s): Cezariusz W. Jastrzębski, Parochial Vicar OFM Conv
- Dean: Witold Mroziewski - auxiliary bishop of the Diocese of Brooklyn
- Pastor: Janusz Dymek Ph.D. OFM Conv

Our Lady of Częstochowa-St Casimir Parish is a church in New York City on 24th Street in Brooklyn.

== History ==
In 1904 the cornerstone was laid for a Gothic church of brick and Belleville gray stone. The front facade on 24th street had a central tower which rose to a height of 176 feet above the sidewalk, flanked by shorter steeples on both sides. The project when completed in 1911 included a school and rectory.

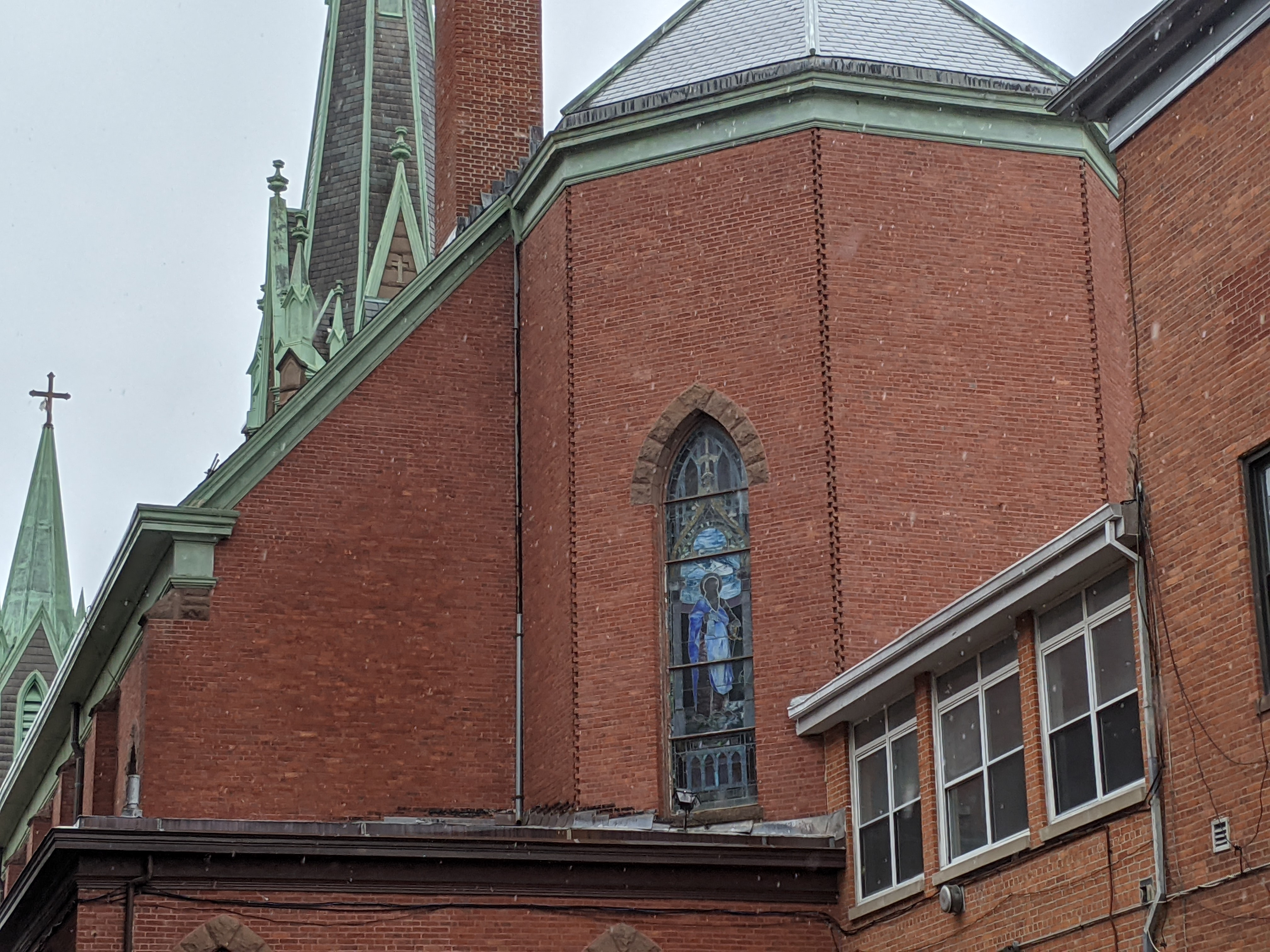
from 25th st, stained Glass image of St. Casamir
