= National Shrine of Our Lady of Czestochowa =

Catholic shrine in Pennsylvania

Coordinates: 40.3192°N 75.1795°W

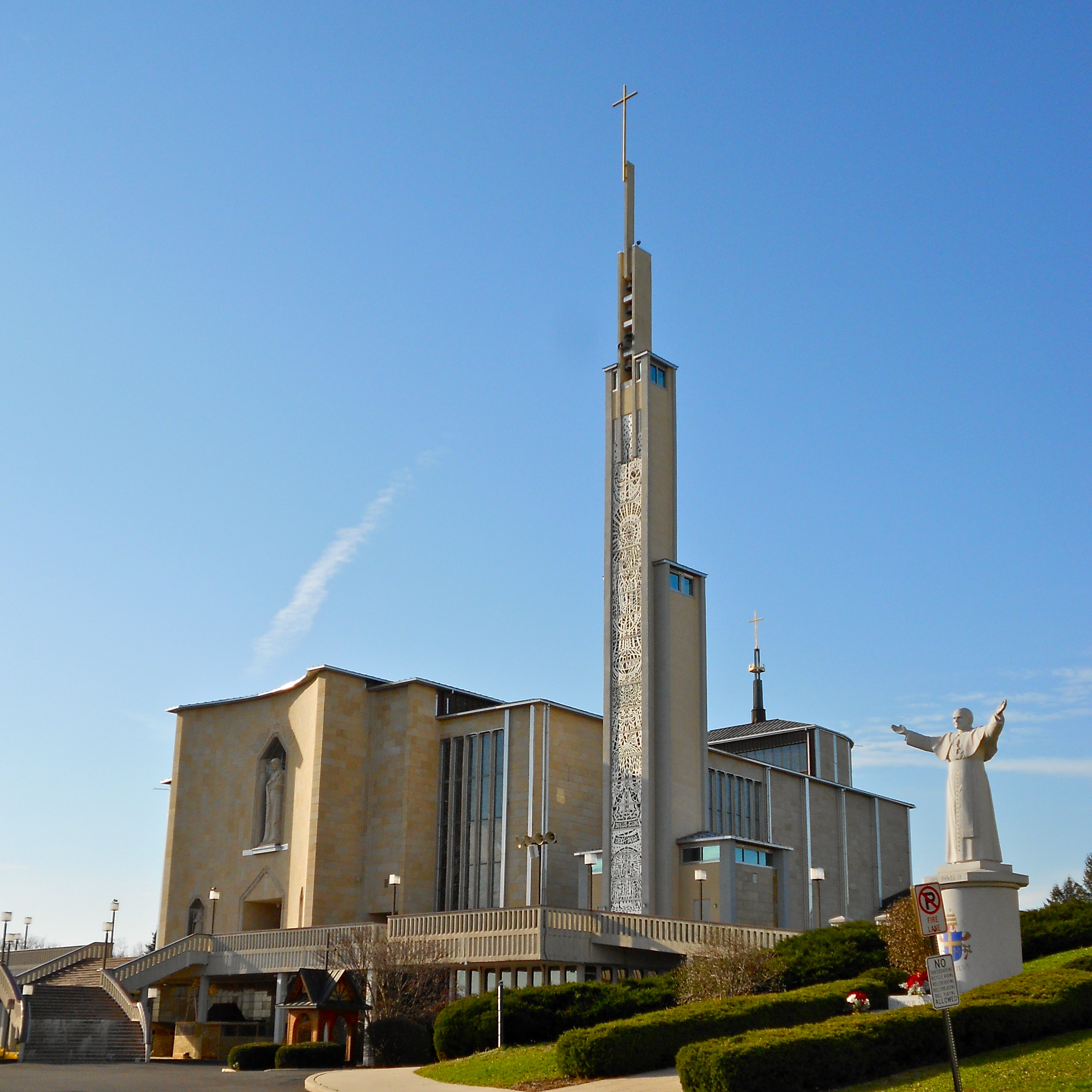
- Shrine pictured from northeast, 2011
- Interactive map of National Shrine of Our Lady of Czestochowa
- Location: Doylestown, Pennsylvania
- Designer: George Szeptycki
- Type: Shrine
- Beginning date: 1953
- Opening date: June 26, 1955
- Dedicated to: Black Madonna of Częstochowa

The National Shrine of Our Lady of Czestochowa (Polish: Narodowe Sanktuarium Matki Bożej Częstochowskiej), also known as the National Shrine of Our Lady of the Bright Mountain (Polish: Narodowe Sanktuarium Matki Bożej Jasnogórskiej), and also commonly known as the American Czestochowa (Polish: Amerykańska Częstochowa), and Czestochowa, is a Polish-American Catholic shrine in New Britain Township, Pennsylvania, near Doylestown, founded in 1953. It houses a reproduction of the Black Madonna icon of Częstochowa, Poland. The heart of Poland's third prime minister, Ignacy Jan Paderewski, is also preserved there.

== History ==
In 1953 a Polish Pauline monk, Father Michael M. Zembrzuski, purchased a tract of land near Doylestown with the intention of building a chapel dedicated to the Black Madonna of Częstochowa at Jasna Góra Monastery, Poland's most important religious icon, to reconnect Polish-Americans with their Polish Catholic roots. Archbishop John Francis O'Hara of Philadelphia granted permission for the erection of a shrine, and a barn was converted into the first chapel; it was moved to a new site and dedicated on June 26, 1955.

The chapel was reorganized as a shrine to celebrate the thousandth anniversary of the Polish nation in 1966. It was dedicated on October 16, 1966, by Archbishop (later Cardinal) John Krol, with President Lyndon B. Johnson and members of his family as honored guests. The centerpiece of the new shrine was a church building designed by the Polish-American architect George Szeptycki housing the replica of the Black Madonna painting.

Cardinal Karol Wojtyla, the future Pope John Paul II, visited twice: first in 1969 and then in 1976, while attending the Eucharistic Congress in Philadelphia.

In subsequent years other facilities have been added to the site, including a Polish-American cemetery (including monuments to Poland's third prime minister Ignacy Paderewski, the Polish-Lithuanian hussars, and the victims of the Katyń massacres), a monastery, and a visitor center. The cemetery also includes the graves of members of the Polish Veterans of World War II. The lower church interior was remodeled to resemble the interior of the Jasna Góra shrine in Poland housing the original painting. There is also an outdoor pathway with the Stations of the Cross.

== Activities ==
One of the largest celebrations is the annual feast of Our Lady of Czestochowa on August 26, followed by an annual Polish Festival held every Labor Day weekend. Since 1988, there has been an annual pilgrimage from the Church of Saints Peter and Paul in Great Meadows, New Jersey. Thousands take part in an outdoor Rosary candlelight procession on October 7, Feast of Our Lady of the Rosary. The shrine is under the direction of the Pauline Fathers and Brothers who also administer the Shrine in Poland.

== Memorials ==
- Monument to the Unbroken Soldiers in American Czestochowa
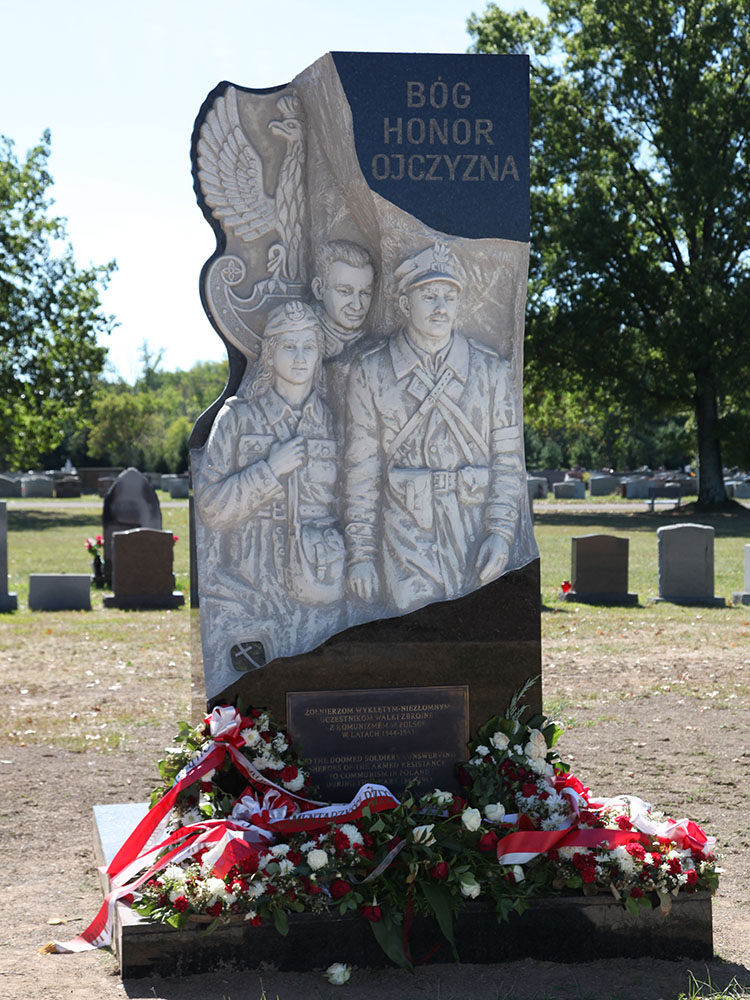
Monument of the Unbroken Soldiers

== See also ==
- Black Madonna Shrine, Missouri
- List of shrines § United States
