= Black Madonna of Częstochowa =

Icon of the Virgin Mary in Poland

Black Madonna of Częstochowa; Our Lady of Częstochowa
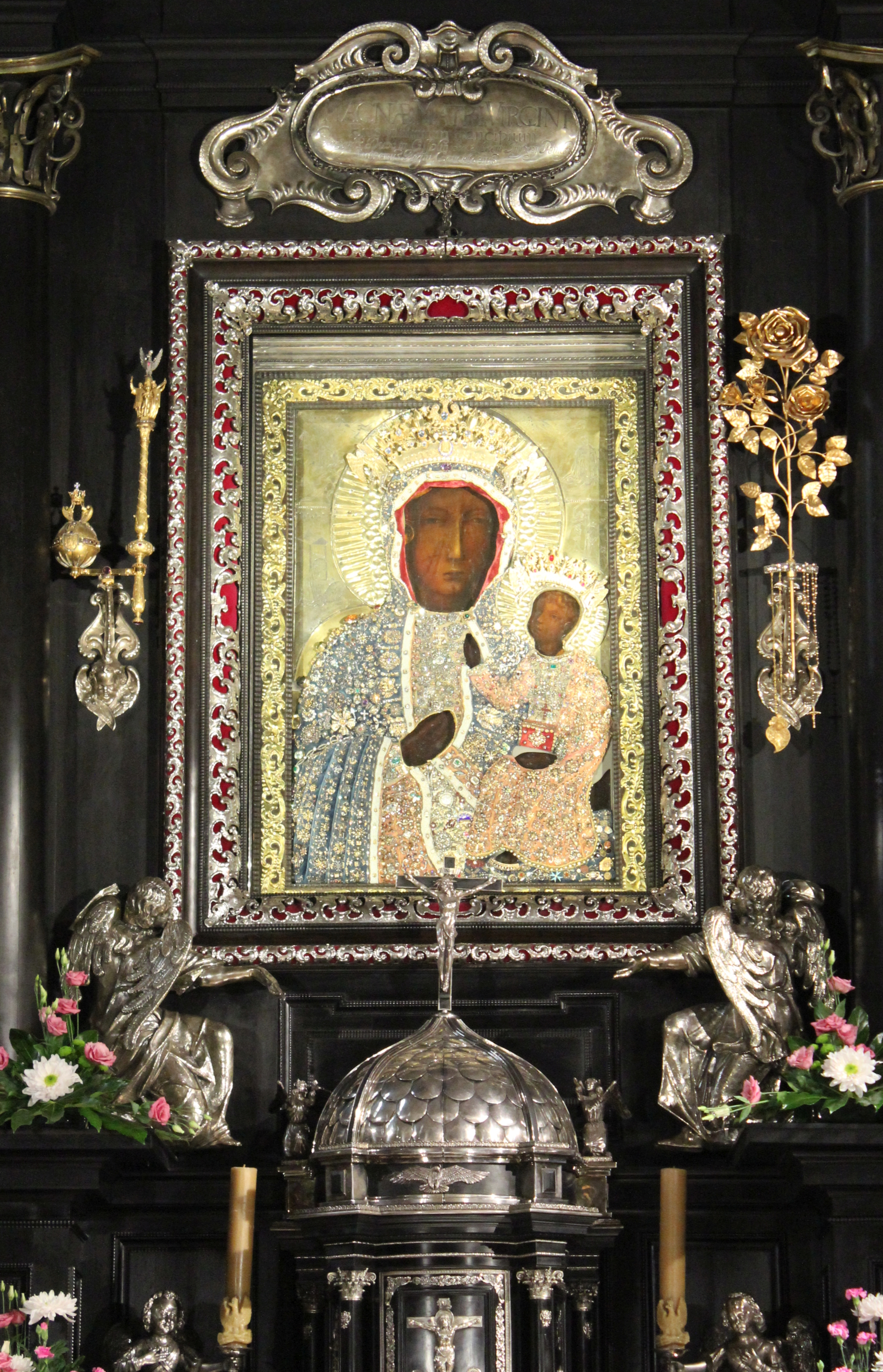
- Location: Częstochowa, Poland
- Date: Early 14th century
- Type: Wooden bejewelled icon
- Approval: Pope Clement XI; Pope Pius X; Pope John Paul II
- Venerated in: Catholic Church, Eastern Orthodoxy
- Shrine: Jasna Góra Monastery, Częstochowa, Poland; National Shrine of Our Lady of Czestochowa, Doylestown, Pennsylvania
- Patronage: Poland
- Attributes: Black Madonna in Hodegetria form, Infant Jesus, fleur-de-lis robes, slashes on right cheek
- Feast day: 26 August (Catholic); 6/19 March (Eastern Orthodox)

The image of Our Lady the Black Madonna of Częstochowa (also known as Our Lady of Jasna Góra) (Polish: Czarna Madonna z Częstochowy/Jasnej Góry; Latin: Imago Miraculis Beatæ Virginis Mariæ Immaculatæ Conceptæ, in Claro Monte, lit. 'Miraculous Image of the Immaculate Conception, the Blessed Virgin Mary in the Crystal Mountain') (Polish: Matka Boża Częstochowska/ Jasnogórska) is a venerated icon of the Madonna and Child enshrined at the Jasna Góra Monastery in Częstochowa, Poland.

Pope Clement XI issued a Pontifical decree of canonical coronation to the image on 8 September 1717 via the Vatican Chapter. The icon has also merited three Pontifical Golden Roses. Accordingly, it is encased under high security glass and is widely venerated by both Roman Catholic and Eastern Orthodox Christians, most especially amongst the Polish peoples.

== Description ==
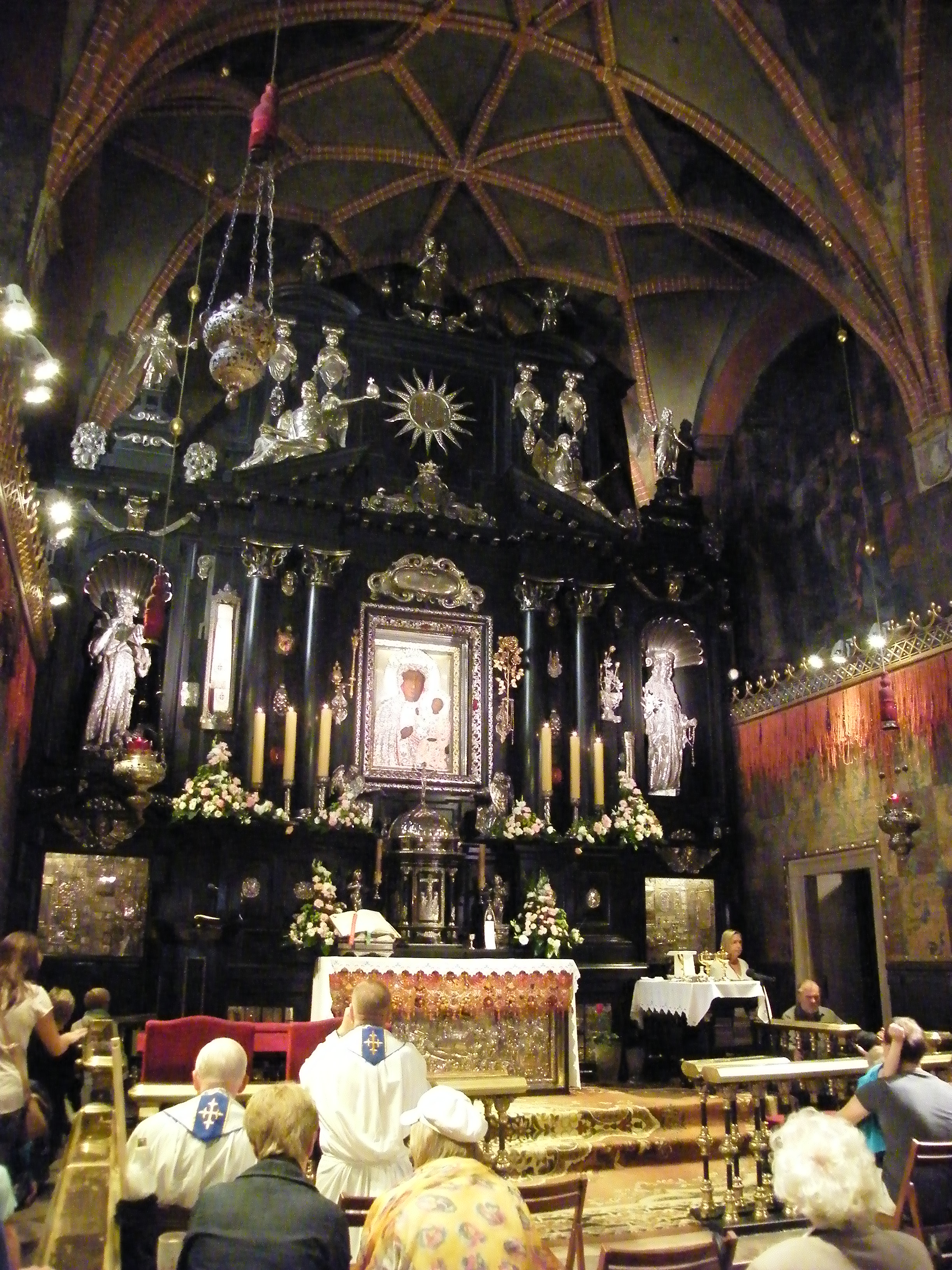
The original icon inside the chapel during its public veneration.

The original painting (122 centimeters × 82 centimetres or 48 by 32 inches) displays a traditional composition well known in the icons of Orthodox Christianity. The Virgin Mary is shown as the "Hodegetria" version (meaning "One Who Shows the Way" or "Οδηγήτρια" in Greek). In it, Mary directs attention away from herself, gesturing with her right hand toward Jesus as the source of salvation. In turn, the child extends his right hand toward the viewer in blessing while holding a book of gospels in his left hand. The icon shows Mary in fleur-de-lis robes.

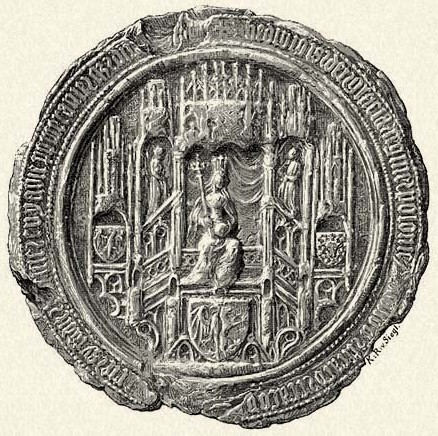
The Royal Seal of Jadwiga Anjou (1374-1399), Queen regnant of Poland (1384-1399). It is speculated that artists might have given her features to the Black Madonna during renovation of the icon in the 1430s.

The origins of the icon and the date of its composition are still contested among scholars. One difficulty in dating the icon is due in part to its original image being painted over after being severely damaged by robbers in 1430. The wooden panel backing the painting was broken, and the image slashed. Medieval restorers unfamiliar with the encaustic method found that the paints they applied to the damaged areas "simply sloughed off the image", according to the medieval chronicler Risinius. Their solution was to erase the original image and repaint it on the original panel. The original features of an Orthodox icon were softened; the nose was made more aquiline.

Zygmunt Holcer proposed that during its restoration in 1430, the face of Mary was given facial features of Queen Jadwiga Anjou, and the new image could served as beatification painting of the Queen (died 1399), who around that time was subject of preeliminary canonization process. In this interpretation fleur-de-lis on Madonna's robes would be put on image as symbol of Anjou dynasty.

== History ==
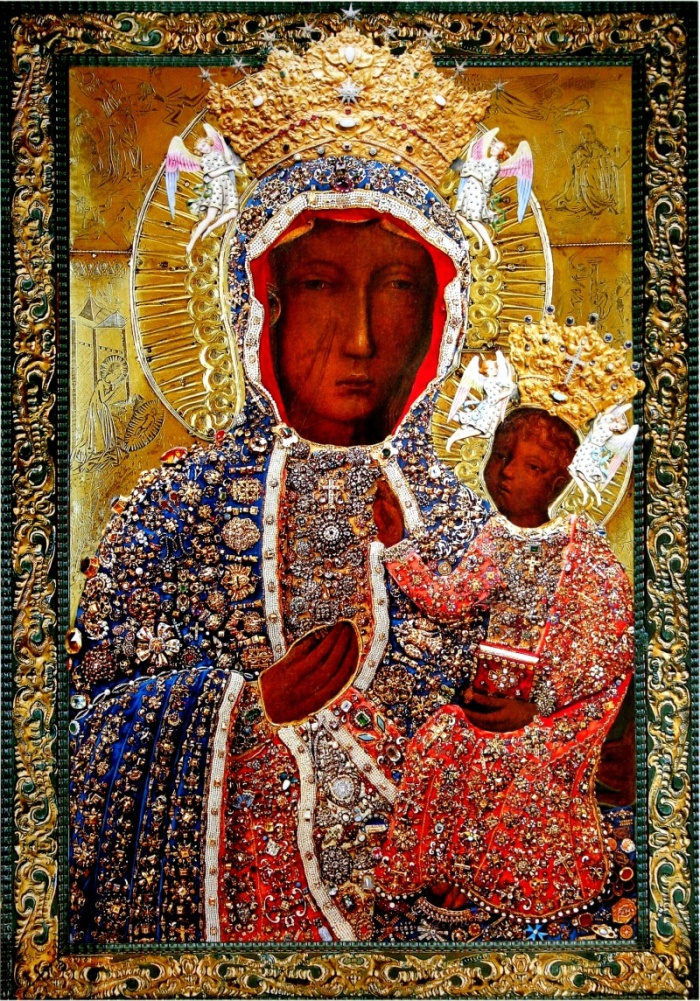
The bejewelled Marian image bearing its Pontifical crown from the reign of Pope Pius X

=== Lucan tradition ===
The icon has been historically associated with Poland for the past 600 years. Its history before it arrived in Poland is shrouded in numerous legends that trace the icon's origin to Saint Luke the Evangelist, who painted it on a cedar table top from the house of the Holy Family. The same legend holds that the painting was discovered in Jerusalem in 326 by Empress Helena, who brought it back to Constantinople and presented it to her son, Emperor Constantine the Great.

=== Arrival in Częstochowa ===
The oldest documents from Jasna Góra state that the picture traveled from Constantinople via Belz. Eventually, it came into the possession of Władysław Opolczyk, Duke of Opole, and adviser to Louis of Anjou, King of Poland and Hungary. Ukrainian sources state that earlier in its history, it was brought to Belz with much ceremony and honors by King Lev I of Galicia and later taken by Władysław from the Castle of Belz when the town was incorporated into the Polish kingdom. A famous story tells that in late August 1384, Władysław was passing Częstochowa with the picture when his horses refused to go on. He was advised in a dream to leave the icon at Jasna Góra.

Art historians say that the original painting was a Byzantine icon created around the sixth or ninth century. They agree that Prince Władysław brought it to the monastery in the 14th century.

=== Queen and Protectress of Poland ===
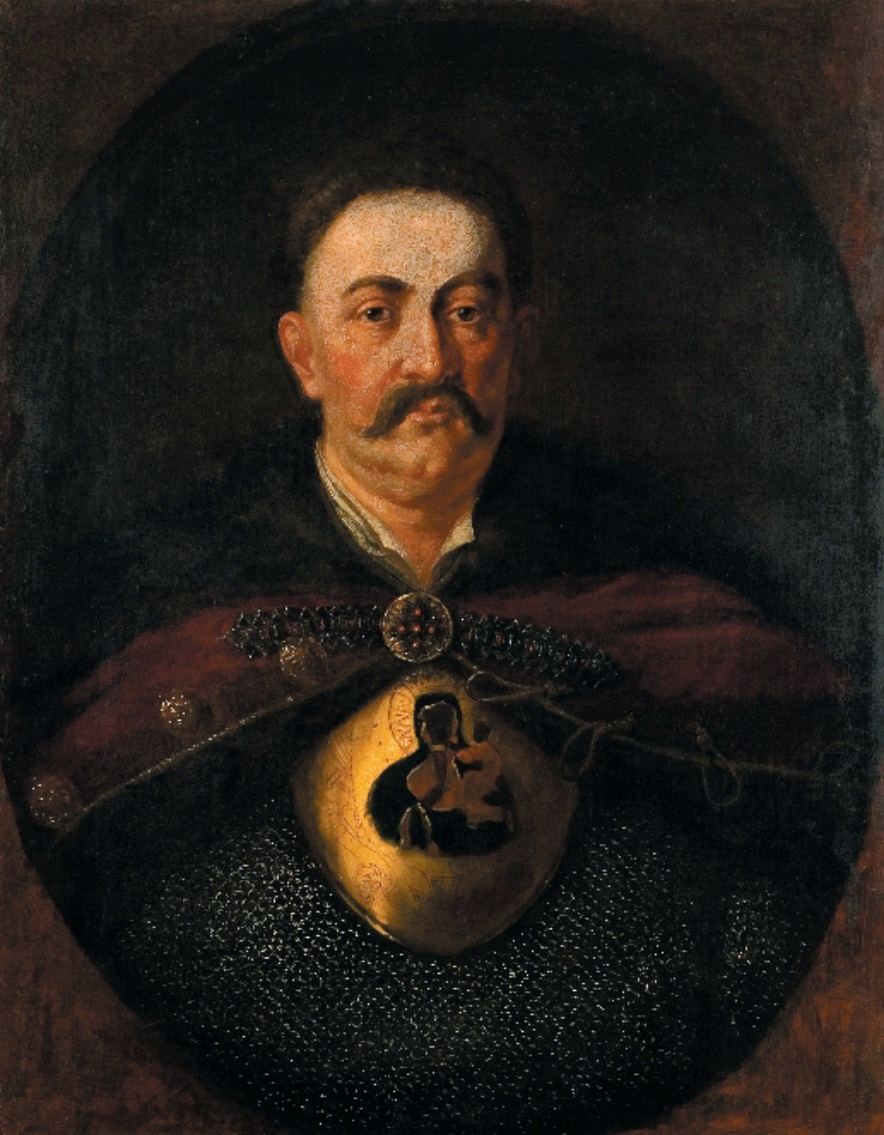
Jan III Sobieski with gorget with Black Madonna of Częstochowa

In August 1382, the hilltop parish church was transferred to the Paulites, a hermitic order from Hungary. The golden fleur-de-lis painted on the Virgin's blue veil parallel the heraldic azure, semée de lis, or of the French royal coat of arms and the most likely explanation for their presence is that the icon had been present in Hungary during the reign of either Charles I of Hungary or Louis the Great, the Hungarian kings of the Anjou dynasty. They probably had the fleur-de-lis of their family's coat of arms painted on the icon. This would suggest that the image was probably originally brought to Jasna Góra by the Pauline monks from their founding monastery in Hungary.

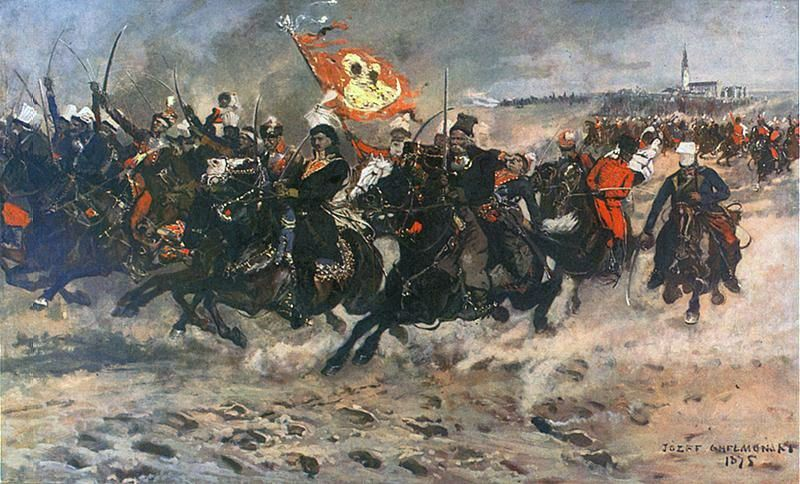
Polish-American hero Kazimierz Pułaski near Częstochowa, a painting by Józef Chełmoński (1875) – the banner of the insurgent troops bears the image of a miraculous painting of Black Madonna.

The Black Madonna is said to have miraculously saved the monastery of Jasna Góra (English: Bright Mount) from a Swedish invasion. The Siege of Jasna Góra took place in the winter of 1655 during the Deluge, as the Swedish invasion of the Polish–Lithuanian Commonwealth is known. The Swedes were attempting to capture the Jasna Góra monastery in Częstochowa. The sacred icon was replaced with a copy and the original moved in secret to the castle in Lubliniec, and later to the Pauline monastery in Mochów between the towns of Prudnik and Głogówek. Seventy monks and 180 local volunteers, mostly from the Szlachta (Polish nobility), held off 4,000 Swedes for 40 days, saved their sacred icon and, according to some accounts, turned the course of the war. This event led King John II Casimir Vasa to give what has become known as the Lwów Oath. He submitted the Polish Commonwealth under the protection of Our Lady and proclaimed her Queen of Poland in the cathedral of Lwów on 1 April 1656. Before this event, several royal nobilities have offered crowns to the image throughout the years, replacing its iron sheet crown riza with one in gold with several jewels. In later years, various gemstones were interchanged and repositioned around the image to preserve the icon's aesthetic by replacing the stolen crowns.

=== Marian apparition ===
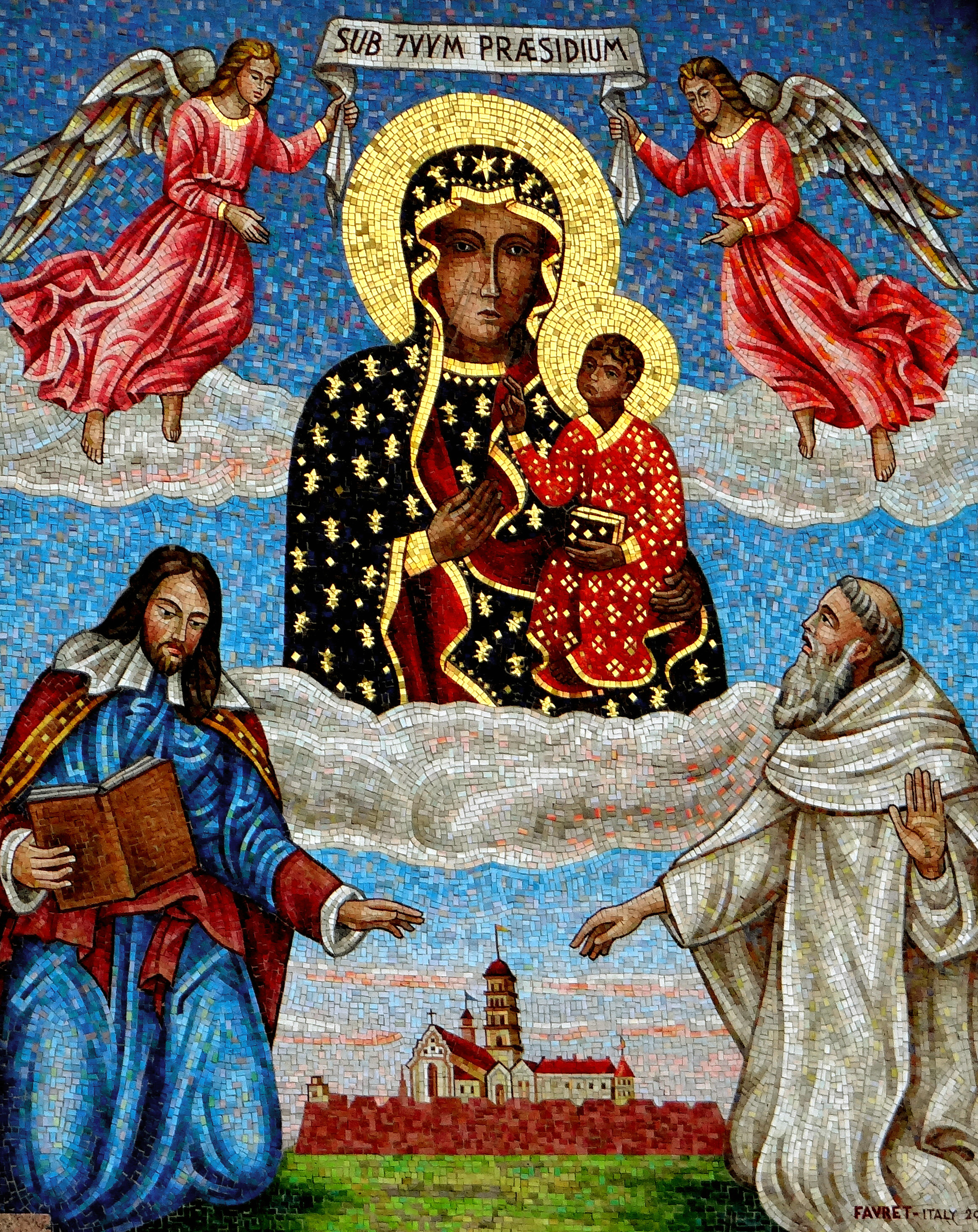
Variant mosaic of the image at the monastery of Jasna Góra

The legend concerning the two scars on the Black Madonna's right cheek is that the Hussites stormed the Pauline monastery in 1430, plundering the sanctuary. Among the items stolen was the icon. The Hussites tried to get away after putting it in their wagon, but their horses refused to move. They threw the portrait down to the ground, and one of the plunderers drew his sword upon the image and inflicted two deep strikes. When the robber tried to inflict a third strike, he fell to the ground and writhed in agony until his death. Despite past attempts to repair these scars, they had difficulty covering up those slashes as the painting was done with tempera infused with diluted wax.

=== Veneration ===
Częstochowa is regarded as the most popular shrine in Poland, with many Polish Catholics making a pilgrimage there every year. Since 1711, a pilgrimage leaves Warsaw every 6 August for the nine-day, 140-mile trek. Elderly pilgrims recall stealing through the dark countryside at great personal risk during the Nazi occupation. Pope John Paul II secretly visited as a student pilgrim during World War II.

The feast day of Our Lady of Częstochowa in the Catholic Church in Poland is celebrated on 26 August. The icon is commemorated in the Eastern Orthodox Churches on 6 March O.S./19 March N.S.

== Pontifical approbations ==
Several pontiffs have recognized the image:

- Pope Clement XI – issued a decree of Canonical Coronation for the image via the Vatican Chapter on 8 September 1717. It is the third image to merit a decree of pontifical coronation outside of Rome. The first one is the Madonna of Trsat in Croatia, followed by the Virgin of Mount Goritia in Slovenia.
- Pope Pius X – after the crowns were stolen on 23 October 1909, the Pontiff replaced the crowns on 22 May 1910.
- Pope John Paul II – gifted another set of crowns as a native of Poland, placed on 26 August 2005.
- Three pontiffs have granted golden roses to the image, Pope John Paul II (1978), Pope Benedict XVI (2006), Pope Francis (2016).

== Outside Poland ==
Ukrainian Catholic shrines in Hoshiv, Ulashkivtsi, Chernivtsi and Borshchiv have variant copies of the Mother of God of Częstochowa, which are miraculous. Eastern Orthodox Christians in Ukraine and Belarus, former parts of the Polish–Lithuanian Commonwealth, also have a special devotion to the Madonna of Częstochowa. The icon is often mentioned in Ukrainian folk songs from the 16th and 17th centuries.

Due to its dark skin complexion, the icon has been syncretized by some Vodou practitioners to the deity Ezili Dantor, the main loa of the Petro family in Haitian Vodou. It is hypothesized that the image was introduced into Haiti by the reproductions of the Black Madonna brought by Polish soldiers who sided with the rebels during the Haitian Revolution.

Our Lady of Częstochowa Roman Catholic Church in Houston, Texas has a copy hanging inside the church to the left of the altar. This version of the icon does not have the heavily gilded gold over the initial image.

The American National Shrine of Our Lady of Częstochowa is located in Doylestown, Pennsylvania. Another shrine of the image is located in Garfield Heights, Ohio; erected on 1 October 1939, by the Sisters of St. Joseph of the Third Order of St. Francis.

In Southern California a replica of the image can be venerated at Our Lady of the Bright Mount, Polish Church in the Archdiocese of Los Angeles.

In Australia, the Shrine of Our Lady of Mercy, Penrose Park, located in the Southern Highlands of New South Wales is dedicated in her honour. The title Our Lady of Mercy is used as remembrance of times throughout history that prayers for protection have been responded to through appeal to Our Lady of Częstochowa, as adherents believe.

There is a memorial dedicated to the Madonna of Częstochowa at the Carfin Grotto, Scotland.

Since 2012, a copy of the icon of Our Lady of Częstochowa visits Catholic and Orthodox parishes in many countries as part of the "From Ocean to Ocean" pilgrimage in defense of life.

== See also ==
- Black Madonna
- Black Madonna Shrine, Missouri
- The Deluge, Swedish invasion
- Erzulie
- Ezili Dantor
- Jasna Góra Monastery
- National Shrine of Our Lady of Częstochowa
- Orthodox Church of the Icon of Our Lady of Częstochowa
- Our Lady of Częstochowa-St Casimir Parish
- Our Lady of Sorrows, Queen of Poland
- Rainbow Madonna

== References and sources ==
=== Sources ===
- "Jasna Góra – Shrine of the Blessed Virgin Mary of Częstochowa". Jasna Góra.
- Kurpik, Wojciech [in Polish] (2008). "Częstochowska Hodegetria" (in Polish, English, and Hungarian). Łódź-Pelplin: Wydawnictwo Konserwatorów Dzieł Sztuki, Wydawnictwo Bernardinum. p. 302. Archived from the original on 18 May 2011.
- "The Mystery of Montserrat: A Sacred Mountain of Christianity". Catholic Exchange. 12 November 2021.
