= Philadelphia Polish American Festival =

The Polish American Family Festival and Country Fair is a celebration of Polish American unity and pride that is among the largest and oldest festivals of its kind in the United States.

It is held each year on the 170-acre (0.69 km^{2}) grounds of the National Shrine of Our Lady of Czestochowa (often referred to as “American Czestochowa.") in Doylestown, PA., a northern suburb of Philadelphia, PA. It is a five-day event that takes place during the first two weekends of September (including Labor Day).

== Purpose ==
The festival is dedicated to promoting greater awareness, understanding and appreciation of Polish heritage, culture, food and traditions. It is a strictly non-profit event and all proceeds are donated to the Shrine, which serves as a major cultural and spiritual center for Polish Americans (Polonia).

The festival is planned and staffed entirely by volunteers who work at the festival itself and maintain the festival grounds and facilities throughout the year. Many of the volunteers are the 2nd and 3rd generation representatives of their families to serve at the event.

== History ==
Dr. Raymond and Virginia Chase, and Father Michael Zembruski, founder of the Shrine, were the founders and organizers of the first festival. They recognized a lack of any local events dedicated to Polish-Americans, despite a significant population of Polish-Americans in the Philadelphia, upstate Pennsylvania and mid-Atlantic regions.

The ‘original’ festival was an informal picnic organized by volunteers, their families and friends, and took place in the same year as the Shrine’s dedication (1966). It included a professional art exhibit of Polish artists, which graced the walls of a historic Bucks County barn located on the Shrine grounds. The helicopter aviation pioneer and National Medal of Technology recipient, Frank Piasecki, donated a helicopter to give rides to the festival guests.

The success from that first year inspired its founders to expand into a formal annual event the next year (1967). This became a harbinger of a revival in Polish ethnic identity that was soon to occur in the early 1970s.

The original festival was simply called the Annual Festival and Country Fair. But in the second year, it was renamed the Polish Festival and Country Fair, and was moved to the upper grounds where the new Shrine basilica had been built. Several years later, the festival dates were expanded to include a second weekend in September to accommodate the ever-increasing crowds. Eventually, the festival name was changed to the Polish-American Festival. In 2010, the festival was finally renamed as the Polish-American Family Festival and Country Fair.

One of the most notable visitors over the years was President Ronald Reagan, who enjoyed a placki (potato pancake) on the festival grounds.

The festival has run uninterrupted every year since its inception.

== The Festival Today ==
The fall of Polish communism in 1989 initiated a large increase in the immigration of Polish nationals to the United States that continues to this day. Many of the new immigrants settled in Pennsylvania, in areas such as the Port Richmond neighborhood of Philadelphia, and in the Brooklyn area of New York City, known as Greenpoint. Many Polish immigrants also immigrated to New Jersey and Connecticut.

This new wave of immigration has served to complement and supplement the ranks of Polish-Americans who have been here from previous generations. As a result of this convergence, the Philadelphia Polish festival has experienced significant growth. It currently draws an average of approximately 20,000 people per year; with 25,000 visitors attending in 2009. As the event has grown, so too has the diversity of festival visitors. People from a wide spectrum of backgrounds and locations visit the festival from the U.S. and Canada attend, with the majority of festival visitors coming from Pennsylvania, New Jersey, and other Middle Atlantic States.

As the festival evolved and expanded, it was more formally organized into three distinct types of events:

- Entertainment
- Food
- Demonstrations and Exhibits

=== Entertainment ===
Music and dance are important aspect of Polish culture. On each festival day there are a variety of musical acts and dance troupes that perform on a main stage area. The music includes a wide variety of popular bands performing Polish-American polka music, as well as presentations of traditional Polish folk genres. The dancing presentations are performed by dance troupes versed in the traditional Polish styles, such as Krakowiak and Górale (highlanders).

In conjunction with the entertainment, the festival organizers invite notable guests of Polish heritage to be guest celebrities. In 2009 the Polish boxer, Tomasz Adamek, served in this role and will do so again in 2010.

=== Food ===
Food also plays a central role in Polish culture and traditions. Because of this, the festival places special emphasis on presenting authentic traditional Polish food based on recipes that were brought to America by Polish immigrants and are still preserved by their Polish-American descendants today. During each festival, a wide variety of Polish dishes is prepared on site. This includes: pierogi, gołąbki (stuffed cabbage rolls), kielbasa, placki (potato pancakes), bigos (cabbage and meat stew), chrusciki (pastry) and babka (a type of coffee cake).

=== Demonstrations and exhibits ===
As part of its mission to promote Polish cultural awareness, the festival stages numerous demonstrations and exhibits to educate visitors about Polish traditions and history.

The cultural focus centers around a replica of a Polish village where a traditional Polish wedding ceremony (Polskie wesele) takes place; a harvest festival (dożynki) is staged; a Maypole dance is performed; and a demonstration of Polish Easter egg (Pisanka) decorating is conducted. Demonstrations also are held to depict the colorful Górale (Polish highlander) traditions. A series of cooking demonstrations is also held to teach the art of making pierogi, kapusta (sauerkraut) and gołąbki (stuffed cabbage).

To enhance an understanding of Polish history, a number of reenactments are conducted. These include live demonstrations of Polish warriors from the 16th to 20th centuries. There is also a reenactment of the lifestyles of “typical” characters – from nobility (szlachta) to peasants (Chłopi) – that were found in Polish society during the 17th century Polish-Lithuanian Commonwealth.

One of the more colorful reenactments is a demonstration of the famed Polish Hussars, who played a prominent role in Polish military history from the early 16th century until the 18th century. There are additional military reenactments that include a Polish Cavalry parade and presentations about key military battles in Polish history.

There is also an art exhibit that displays the works of the Styka family of Polish painters, which included Jan, and his two sons, Tadeusz (“Tade”) and Adam.
