= Tophane Park =

Park in Beyoğlu, Istanbul, Turkey

- Tophane Parkı
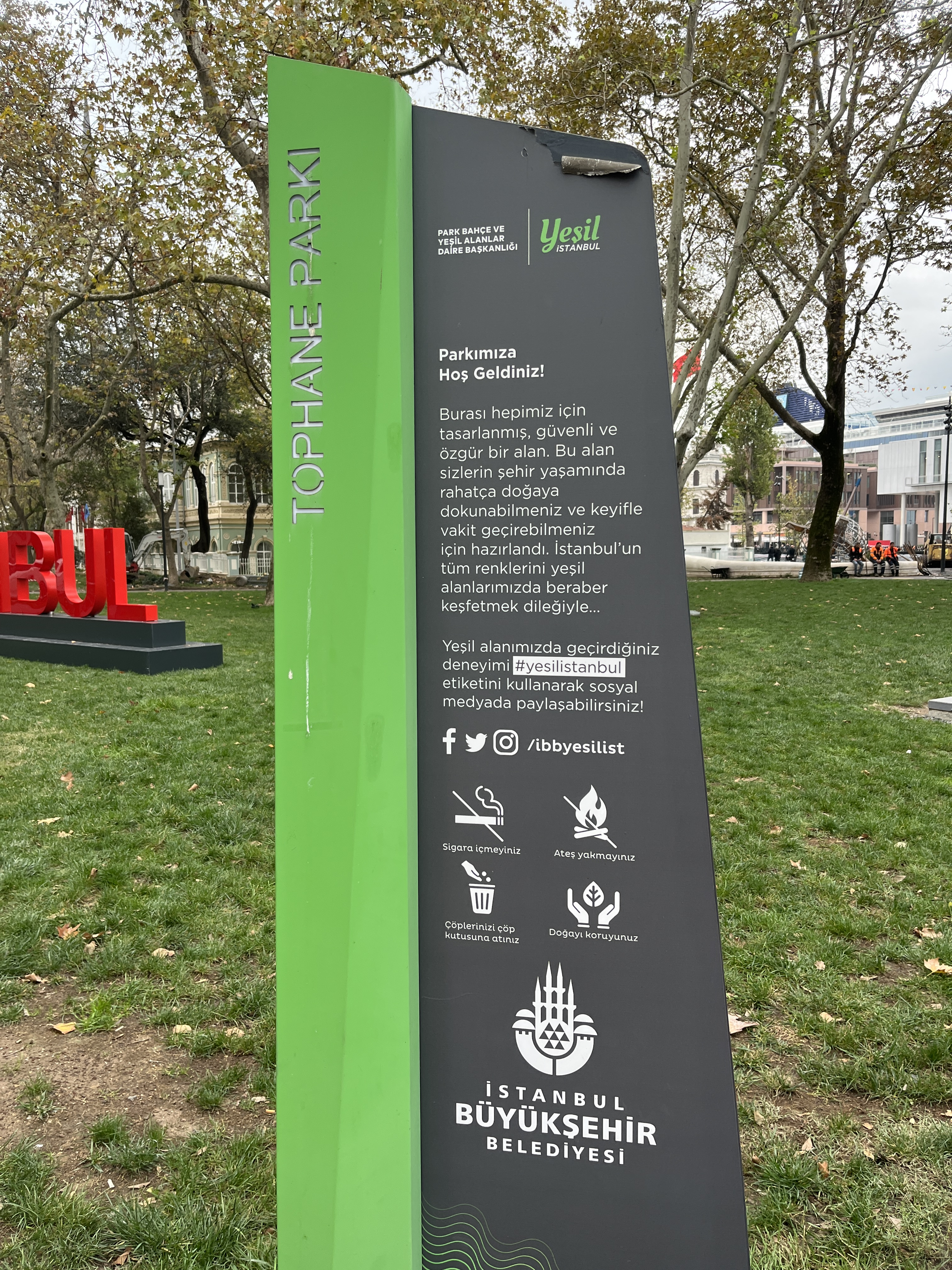
- Park sign, 2023
- Location: Beyoğlu, Istanbul, Turkey
- Coordinates: 41°01′37″N 28°58′48″E

Tophane Park (Turkish: Tophane Parkı) is a park in Beyoğlu, Istanbul.

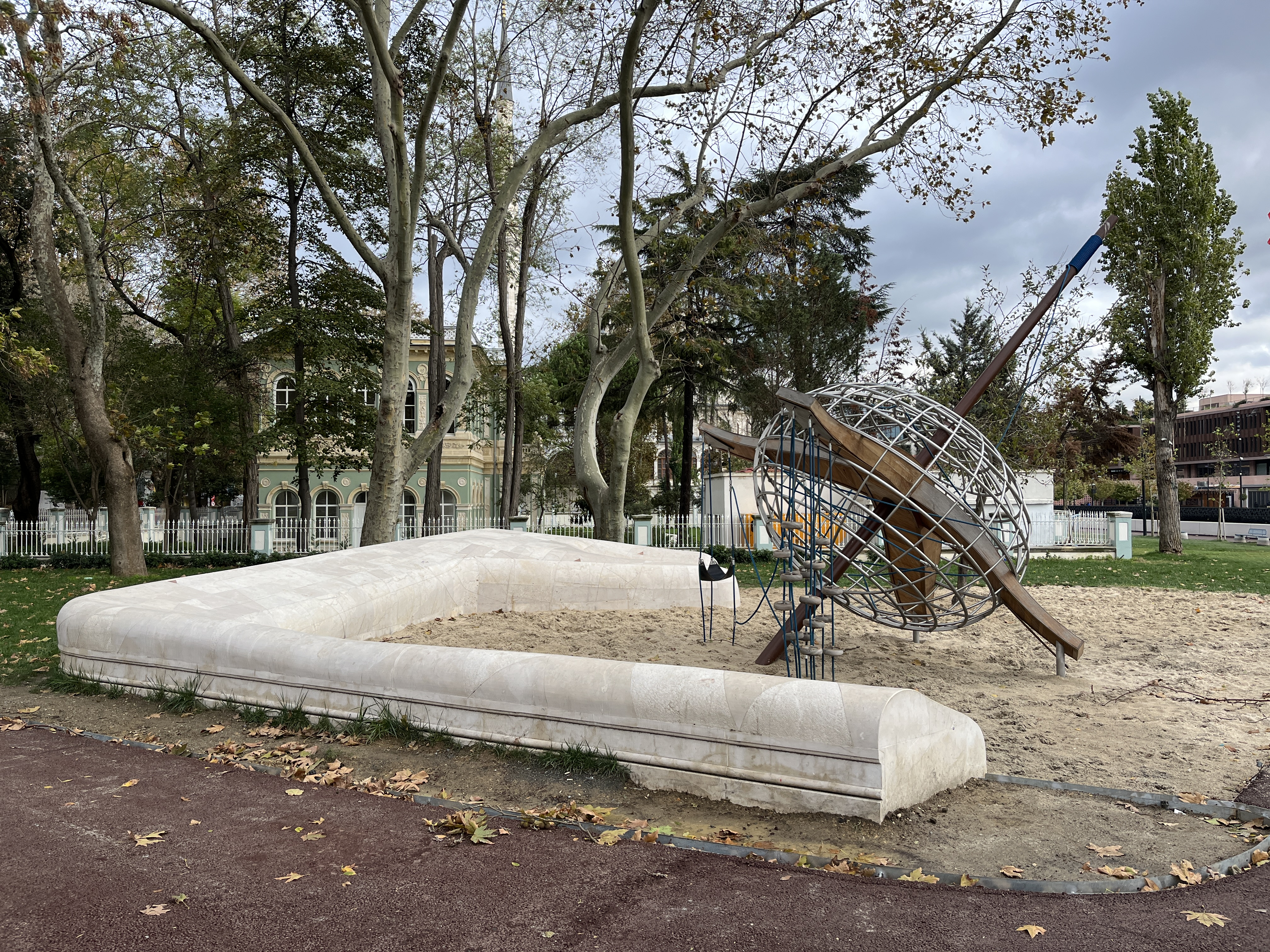

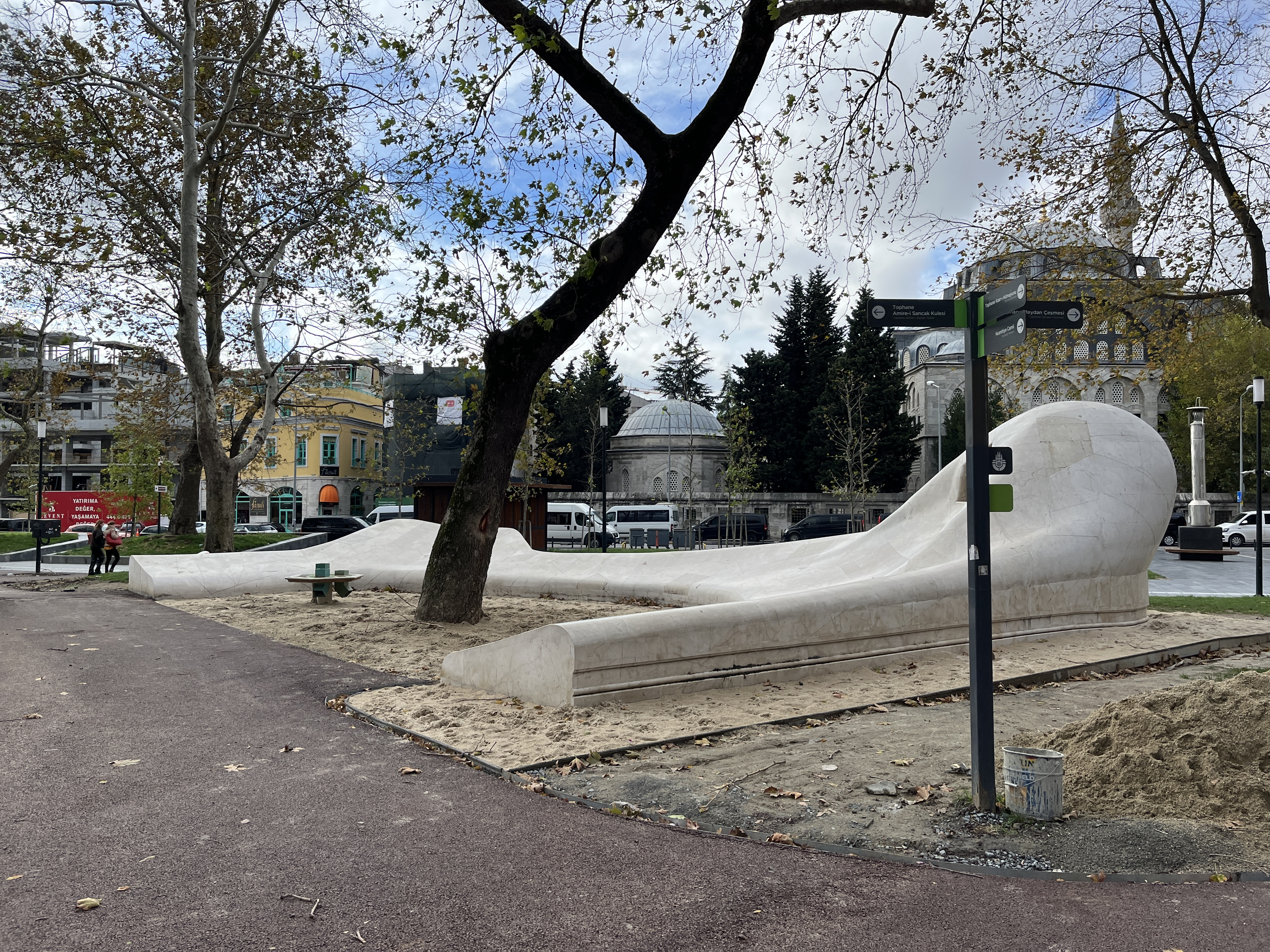
