= Church of Saint Benoit, Istanbul =

Church of Saint Benoit Saint Benoit Kilisesi
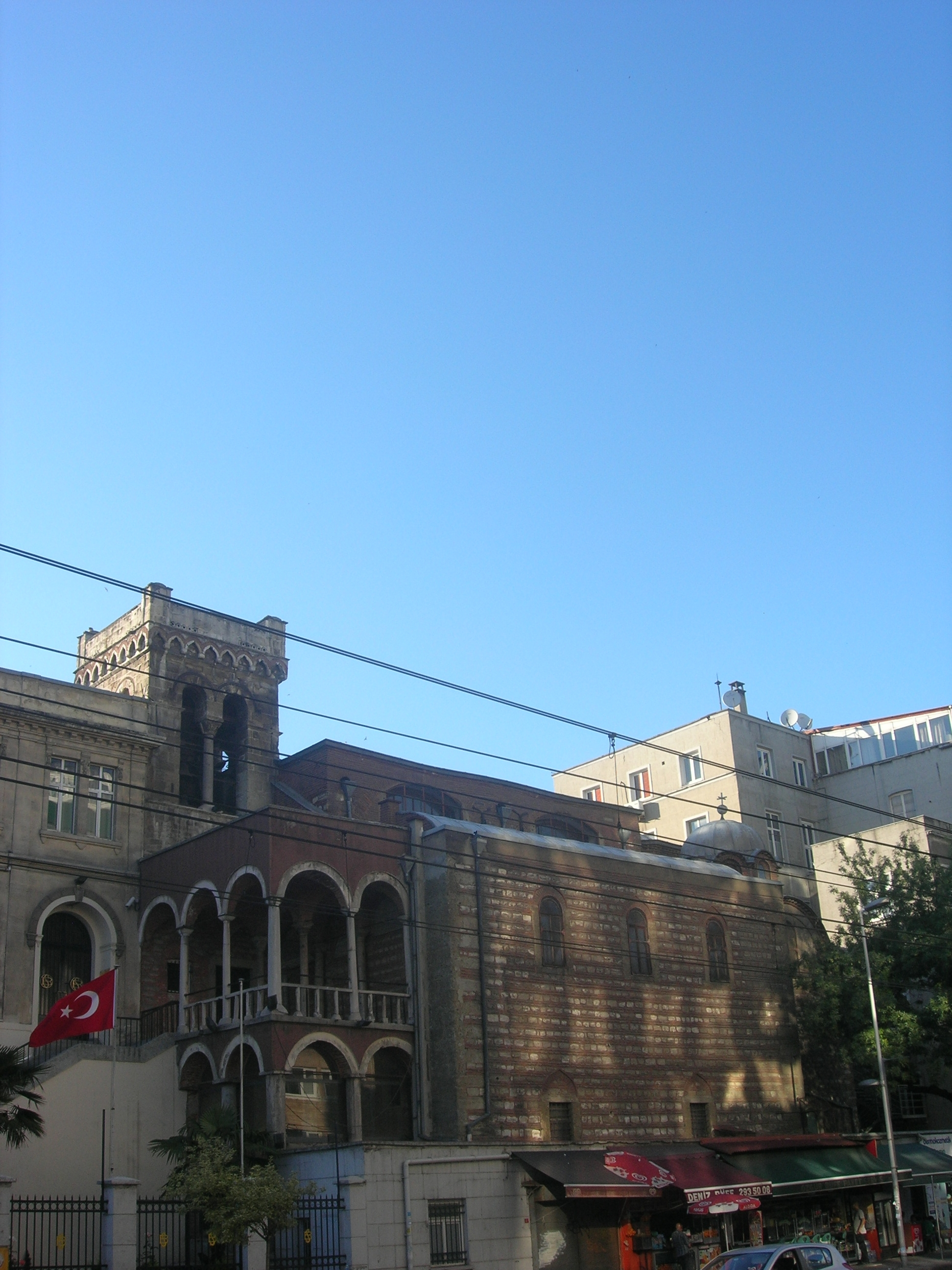
- The Church seen from south

- Location within Istanbul Fatih
- 41.025°N 28.97660°E
- Location: Beyoğlu, Istanbul
- Country: Turkey
- Denomination: Roman Catholic

History
- Dedication: Saint Benedict, Sancta Maria de Misericordia
- Dedicated: 12 May 1427

Architecture
- Architectural type: church
- Groundbreaking: 1427
- Completed: 1871

Saint Benoit (French: Saint Benoît; Turkish: Saint Benoît Latin Katolik Kilisesi; also Italian: Santa Maria della Cisterna) is a Roman Catholic Church in Istanbul, Turkey, important for historical reasons. Established in 1427, the shrine is the oldest Catholic church of Istanbul still in use.

== Location ==
The edifice lies in Istanbul, in the district of Beyoğlu, in the neighborhood of Karaköy (ancient Galata), almost at the border with Tophane, at Kemeraltı Caddesi 11, on a terrace at the top of a staircase.

== History ==
=== Byzantine Age ===
On May 12, 1427, Benedictine friar Dom Nicolas Meynet, together with friars from Genoa founded a monastery in Constantinople, on the southeastern slope of the Galata hill. The Genoese had since a few years enlarged for the sixth and last time the wall which protected their Peyre Galata citadel, and the monastery was built just inside the new ramparts. The church, jointly dedicated to St. Benedict and the Virgin Mary (Latin: Sancta Maria de Misericordia), lay on the ruins of an ancient church and near a large cistern, both Byzantine. Due to that, the church was also known as of "Santa Maria della Cisterna". On May 13, 1449, the Friars joined the congregation of St. Justine from Padova. In 1450, the little monastery had 16 monks. In 1453, shortly before the Ottoman Conquest of Constantinople, the friars sent all the relics and the religious ornaments of their church to Chios and then to Genoa, to rescue them from the impending Ottoman attack.

=== Ottoman Age ===
After 1478, the community was repeatedly shuttered by fights among friars, until Sultan Suleyman the Magnificent menaced to convert the building into a mosque for the Moors who, expelled in those years from Spain, were resettling in Galata. Thanks to the intercession of King Francois I of France, the friars could remain in the complex, which became the Royal chapel of the Ambassador of France at the Porte. In 1540, French voyager Pierre Gilles visited the site, and described the giant cistern with 300 columns, which were later dismantled and sold by the Genoese.

On 18 November 1583, members of the Society of Jesus led by Giulio Mancinelli, sent by Pope Gregory XIII upon request of the Magnifica Communità di Pera (the Genoese administration in Galata), took charge of the church, founding a school in the precincts of the monastery.

The shrine burned several times: after the first fire in 1610, it was restored by a Venetian and French endowment. St. Benoit was the only church to be spared by the great fire of Galata of 1660, but the monastery in that occasion was damaged and plundered.

During the Seventeenth Century the monastery's life was disturbed several times by plague and internal disputes among friars. In 1686 the church burned because of negligence, and was restored by the friars and the French ambassador. In this occasion the Mufti of Istanbul donated the pillars still standing at the top of the staircase, and approved the reconstruction project with a lead roof cover and vaults, elements usually allowed only for mosques. In 1696 the church burned again but was restored one year later by the association of the Merchants of Marseille.

In this period St. Benoit became the most prestigious church of Galata, being used as a burial place by the upper class of the quarter and by several aristocrats and French ambassadors. Moreover, Saint Benoit was also used as national church of the Germans in Istanbul. During these years, a hospital was added to the complex. The Seventeenth-Century Ottoman traveler Evliya Çelebi describes the shrine as a "French church with an Organ". In 1731 the edifice burned again during another quarter fire, but was restored in 1732 by the French Ambassador.

On 6 July 1735 the body of the Hungarian exile Francis II Rákóczi, considered a national hero in his country, was buried in St. Benoit, next to his mother Zrínyi Ilona. There they remained, their graves often visited by Hungarian visitors to the city, until moved to Hungary in 1906.

After the Suppression of the Society of Jesus in 1773, in 1783 French Lazarists friars took over the complex. At the end of the eighteenth century a chapel dedicated to St. Anne was built. After problems during the French Revolution, in 1804 the friars restored the church, and transformed the existing school into the "Lycée Saint-Benoît d'Istanbul" (Turkish: Özel Saint-Benoît Fransız Lisesi) which exists still today and is one of the most prestigious private schools in Istanbul.

In 1839, nuns belonging to the Soeurs de la Charité (Daughters of Charity) society came from France and founded the female section of the school. In 1840 the school was moved to Bebek, but after the demolition of part of the Genoese ramparts of Galata, the school moved back here. In 1865 part of the left aisle and the atrium with several inscriptions burned. This part of the church was coarsely restored in 1871.

In 1867 the complex was enlarged with the erection of the "Maison de la providence" complex, comprising, among others, an orphanage, a hospital and a seminary.
The church was never one of the Roman Catholic Parishes of the Frankish quarter of Istanbul, but is the oldest Catholic church in Istanbul still in use.

== Architecture and interior ==
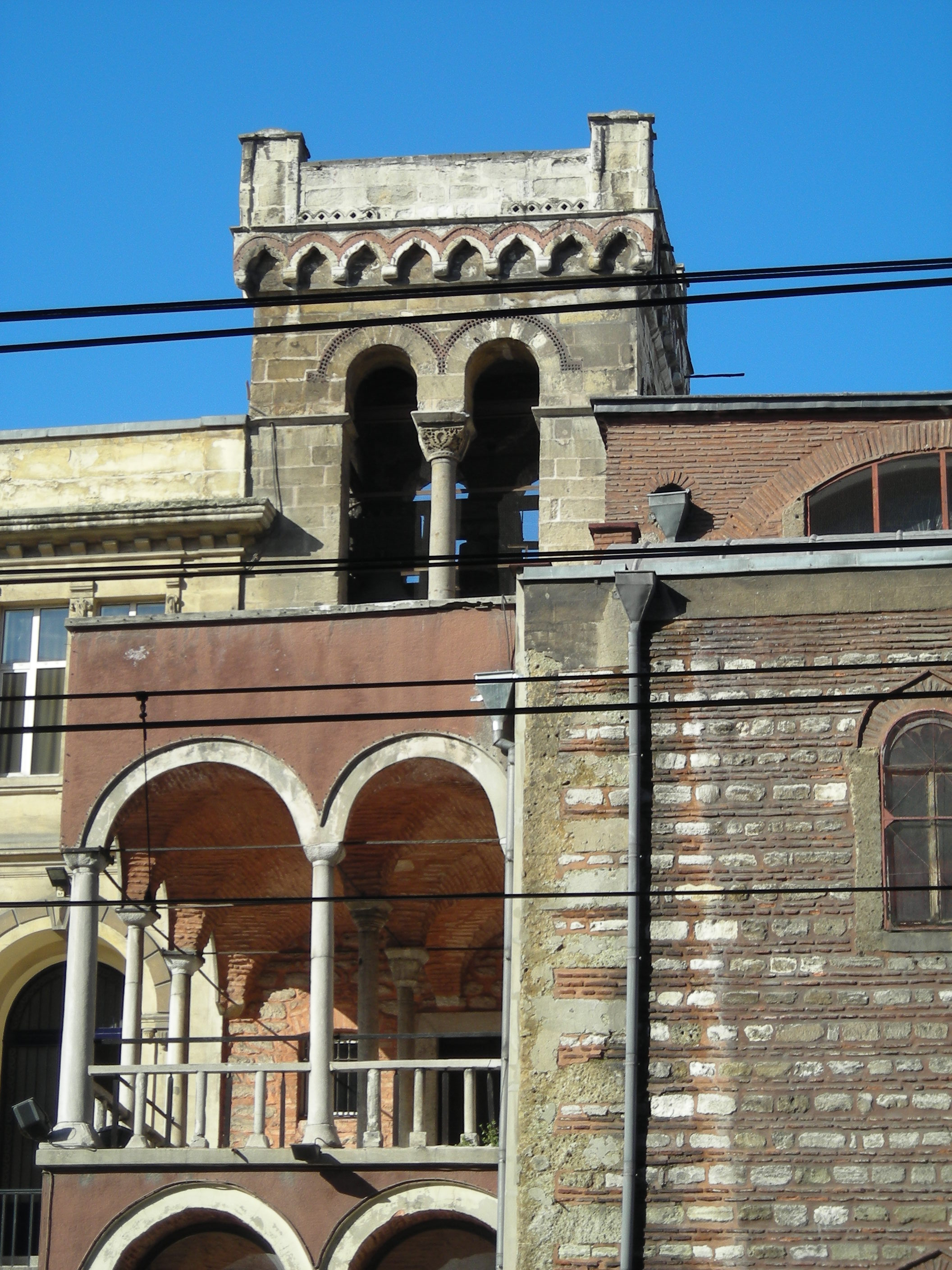
Detail of the bell tower, originating from the fifteenth century

The church has the entrance on Kemeraltı Caddesi, and can be reached by a staircase leading uphill. The complex leans on a terrace, perhaps part of the Byzantine cistern which once lay nearby. During the Ottoman age the site became a fruit garden, and was then known under the name Çukurbostan ("Hollow Garden"). Originally the small church with three naves had only one dome (the two over the side aisles are later additions), an atrium and a gallery, while the interior was decorated with much admired mosaics depicting the life and passion of Christ. The rectangular building is oriented in direction southwest–northeast and has an entrance on the west side with an atrium whose columns and capitals are almost totally Byzantine spolia. The edifice's brickwork is made of alternate rows of stones and bricks, and the three naves are covered by groin vaults. The main and the south naves originate from the 1752 restoration, while the north one has been erected during the 1871 reconstruction. The first two naves end to the east with small chambers covered with domes. It is possible that the southernmost of these chambers is still a remain of an ancient Byzantine church. The portal on Kemeraltı Caddesi and the bell tower with square plan and crenelated moulding, originally a watch tower, come both from the fifteenth century. In the interior, several inscribed gravestones from the seventeenth and eighteenth centuries remember wealthy Levantine families, church's benefactors, and French Ambassadors. In the church were among others buried the Croatian noblewoman Jelena Zrinska and her son, the Hungarian aristocrat Francis II Rákóczi, both dead in exile in the Ottoman Empire.

== See also ==
- Embassy chapel

== Sources ==
- Mamboury, Ernest (1953). The Tourists' Istanbul. Istanbul: Çituri Biraderler Basımevi.
- Janin, Raymond (1953). La Géographie Ecclésiastique de l'Empire Byzantin. 1. Part: Le Siège de Constantinople et le Patriarcat Oecuménique. 3rd Vol. : Les Églises et les Monastères (in French). Paris: Institut Français d'Etudes Byzantines.
- Eyice, Semavi (1955). Istanbul. Petite Guide a travers les Monuments Byzantins et Turcs (in French). Istanbul: Istanbul Matbaası.
- Müller-Wiener, Wolfgang (1977). Bildlexikon zur Topographie Istanbuls: Byzantion, Konstantinupolis, Istanbul bis zum Beginn d. 17 Jh (in German). Tübingen: Wasmuth. ISBN 978-3-8030-1022-3.
