= Shrine of Our Lady of Mercy, Penrose Park =

Pauline Fathers' monastery and shrine

Shrine of Our Lady of Mercy
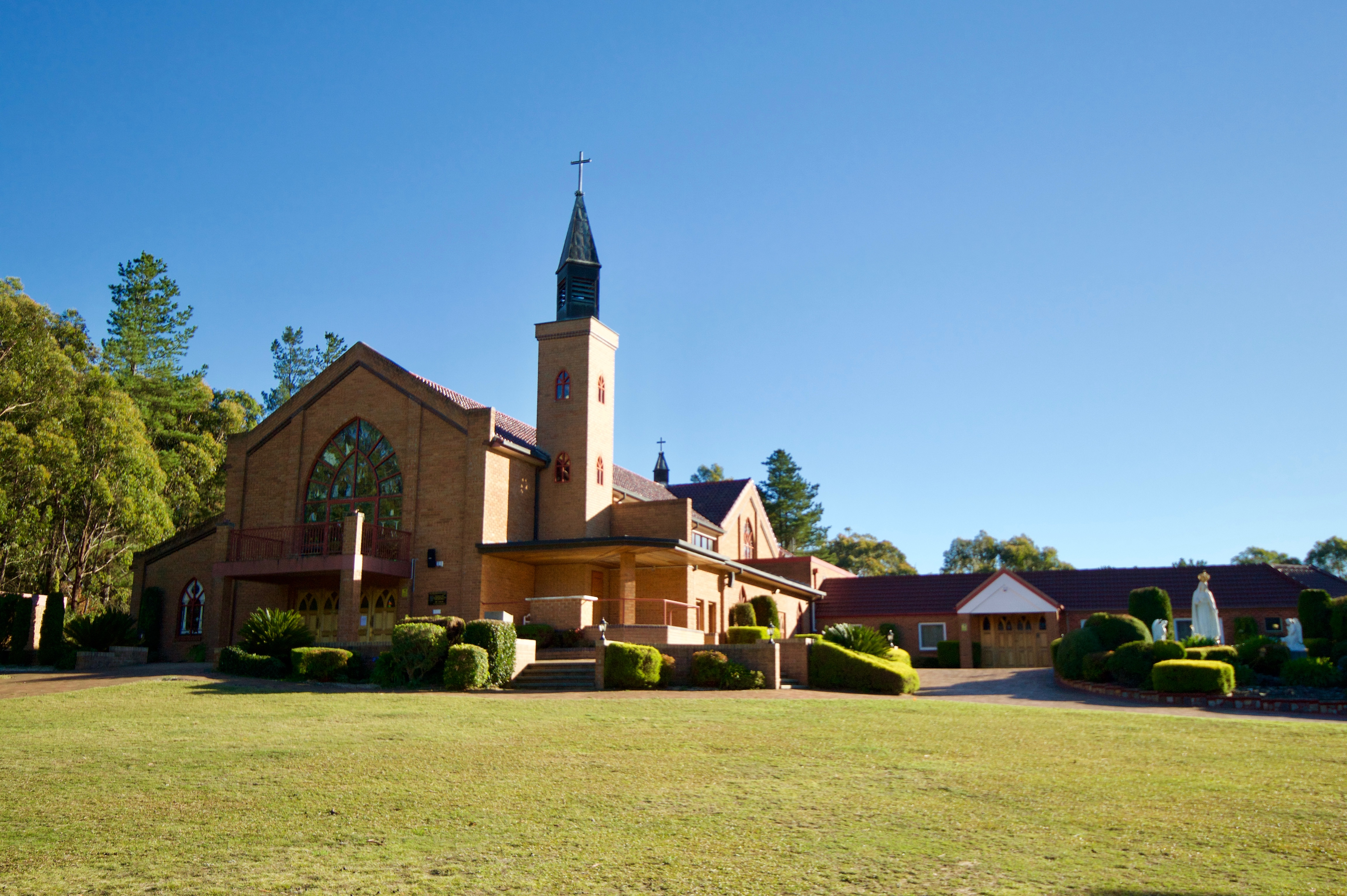
- A view of the Shrine Church

- Location within New South Wales
- Interactive map of Shrine of Our Lady of Mercy

Monastery information
- Other names: Penrose Park, Berrima
- Order: Order of Saint Paul the First Hermit
- Denomination: Catholic
- Established: 1984
- Consecrated: 24th May 1997
- Diocese: Roman Catholic Diocese of Wollongong

People
- Founder: Fr Augustine Joseph Lazur

Architecture
- Style: Romanesque Revival

Site
- Location: Sutton Forest, New South Wales
- Country: Australia
- Coordinates: 34°37′20.22″S 150°11′48.36″E
- Public access: yes
- Website: http://penrosepark.com.au/

The Shrine of Our Lady of Mercy, commonly known as Penrose Park, located in the Southern Highlands, New South Wales, is a Catholic place of veneration of the replica of the Our Lady of Jasna Góra, a Black Madonna. The shrine is ministered by the Order of Saint Paul the First Hermit, known as the Pauline Fathers, who have been the custodians of the original Icon of the Black Madonna since 1382. The Shrine of Our Lady of Mercy, Penrose Park, is one of only two shrines dedicated to Our Lady in Australia.

== Order of Saint Paul the First Hermit ==
The Order of St. Paul the First Hermit — The Pauline Fathers — is a monastic order founded in the 13th century by Blessed Eusebius of Esztergom. The Order arrived in Australia in the 1980s, established two monasteries, and cared for several parishes. The Shrine of Our Lady of Mercy was the first of the two monasteries to be founded.

== History ==
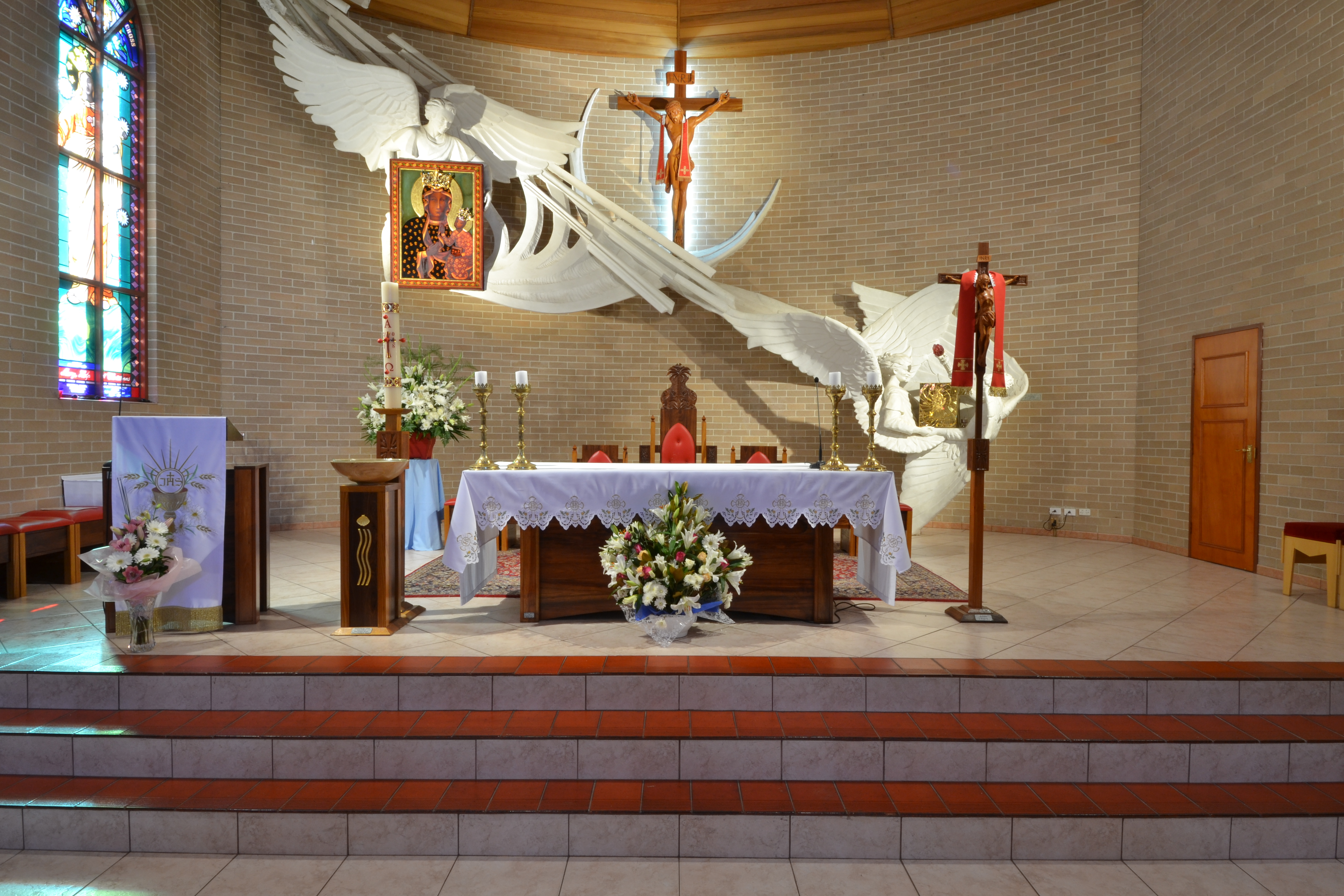
Altar of the church at the Shrine of Our Lady of Mercy at Penrose Park showing the replica of the Black Madonna icon, top left

The history of the monastery and shrine starts in 1984 with Fr Augustine Joseph Lazur, who had arrived in Australia a few years before in April 1981. He had just managed to bring out a replica of the Black Madonna of Częstochowa to Australia. At the time he was serving as the Parish Priest at St Francis Xavier Berrima (the Pauline Fathers being at Berrima for several years before establishing the monastery have caused people still to call the monastery Berrima), he began looking for a place to build a permanent shrine in her honour.

With the help of many benefactors, a property was brought in 1984. There in 1985, he converted the existing barn into a house and chapel, which though very primitive, would serve as the monastery and church until something better could be built. The pilgrims that had already started coming to visit when Fr Augustine was at Berrima soon started to come to the new property. A rocky cave formation at the end of the property was found and turned into a grotto inspired in appearance by the one where Our Lady appeared at Lourdes. To this grotto, below which an altar was built, processions would regularly take place. As more and more pilgrims arrived, the shrine continued to grow, and more men joined the new community prompting the local bishop to raise the Shrine of Our Lady of Mercy to the level of an official diocesan shrine. It took the next ten years to accomplish, but in 1995 the Father and Brothers now living at the shrine were able to move into a newly built monastery attached to an also newly built church. The Church and Monastery were then consecrated on May 24, 1997. Further additions were made to the property in 2010 when the neighbouring property was purchased, adding 50 acres of land and two houses, one of which was converted into a piety shop and the other for pilgrims to stay for short periods. In 2011 the "Old Monastery" where the Pauline Fathers had started was renovated.

== Icon of the Black Madonna ==
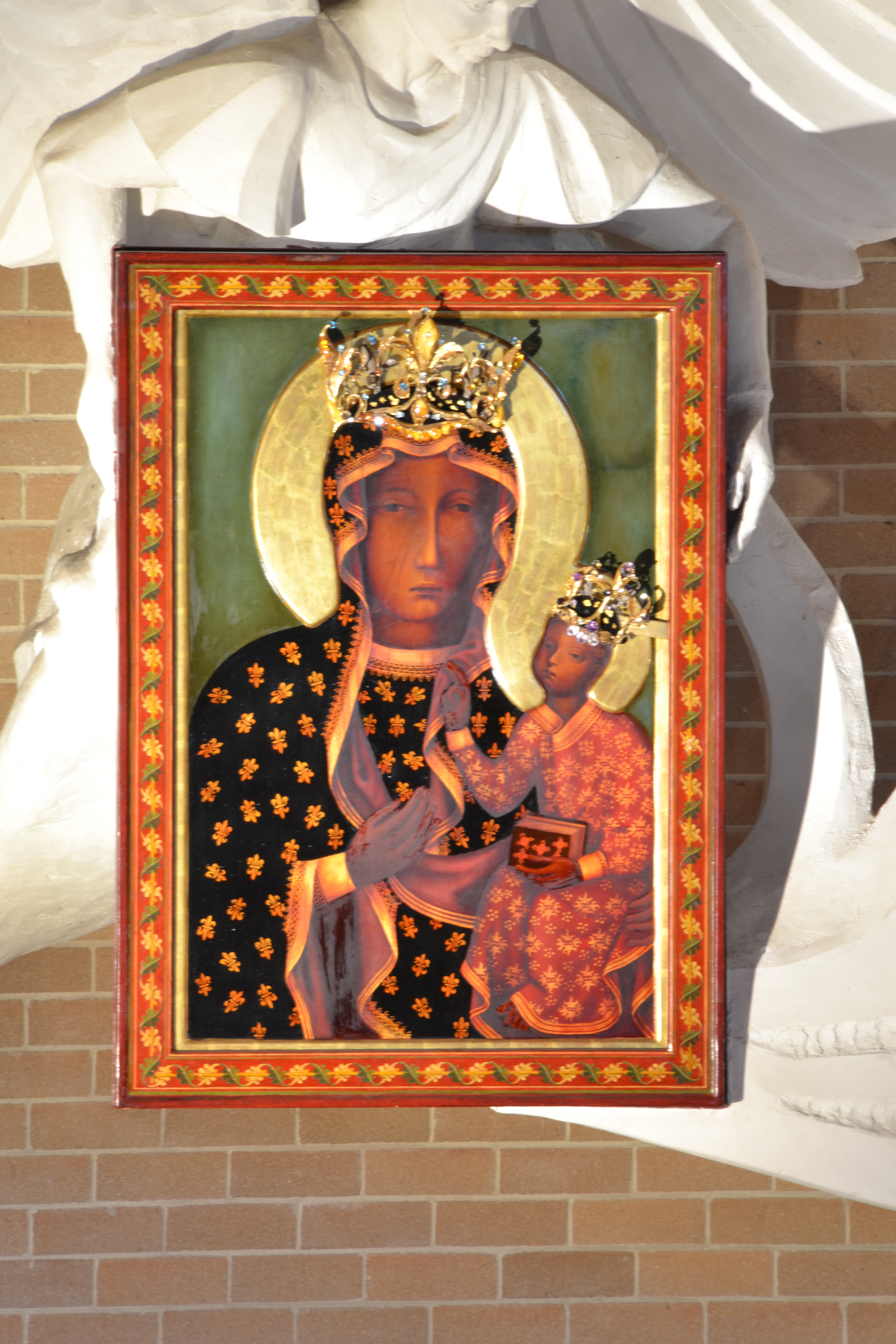
Replica of the Black Madonna icon in the shrine church

The Shrine has a replica of the icon of Black Madonna of Częstochowa of which the Order of Saint Paul the First Hermit have been custodians since 1382. This replica was brought to Australia by Fr. Augustine Lazur after Pope John Paul II blessed it on the 20th of June 1983, during his pilgrimage to Jasna Góra. The Icon was first enshrined in the church at Berrima on the 13th of May 1984 before it would be moved to its permanent home at the then soon to be founded Monastery. This icon was crowned in 2001 with crowns that had been blessed by Pope John Paul II.

== International chapels ==
One of the unique features of the shrine has been the development of the international chapels built all around the property. As pilgrims have come to the shrine over the years, many have expressed the desire to have something that connects them to their various ethnic and cultural backgrounds. The Pauline Fathers allowed communities to build small chapels honouring various saints or Marian apparitions. Today there are nearly 50 such shrines built on the property.

== Events ==
The shrine is open daily for pilgrims to come, whether to attend Mass held daily at 11 am or visit the grounds containing many small shrines built by various ethnic communities. Events held at the Shrine that attract larger groups of pilgrims include the Fatima Days that are held every 13th of the month and the Good Friday Passion Play - a live-action re-enactment of the Passion of Christ.

== Gallery ==
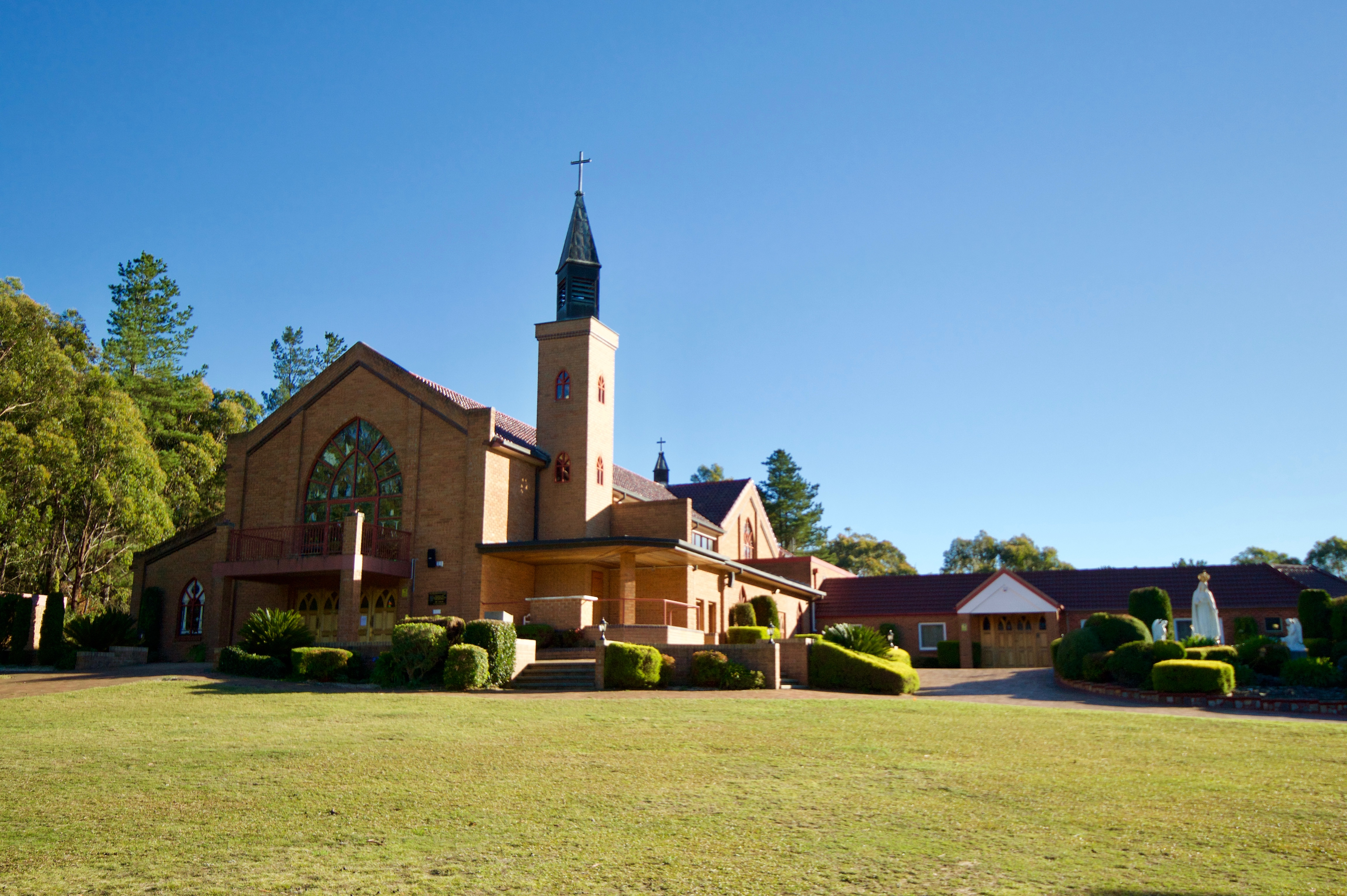
Shrine Church

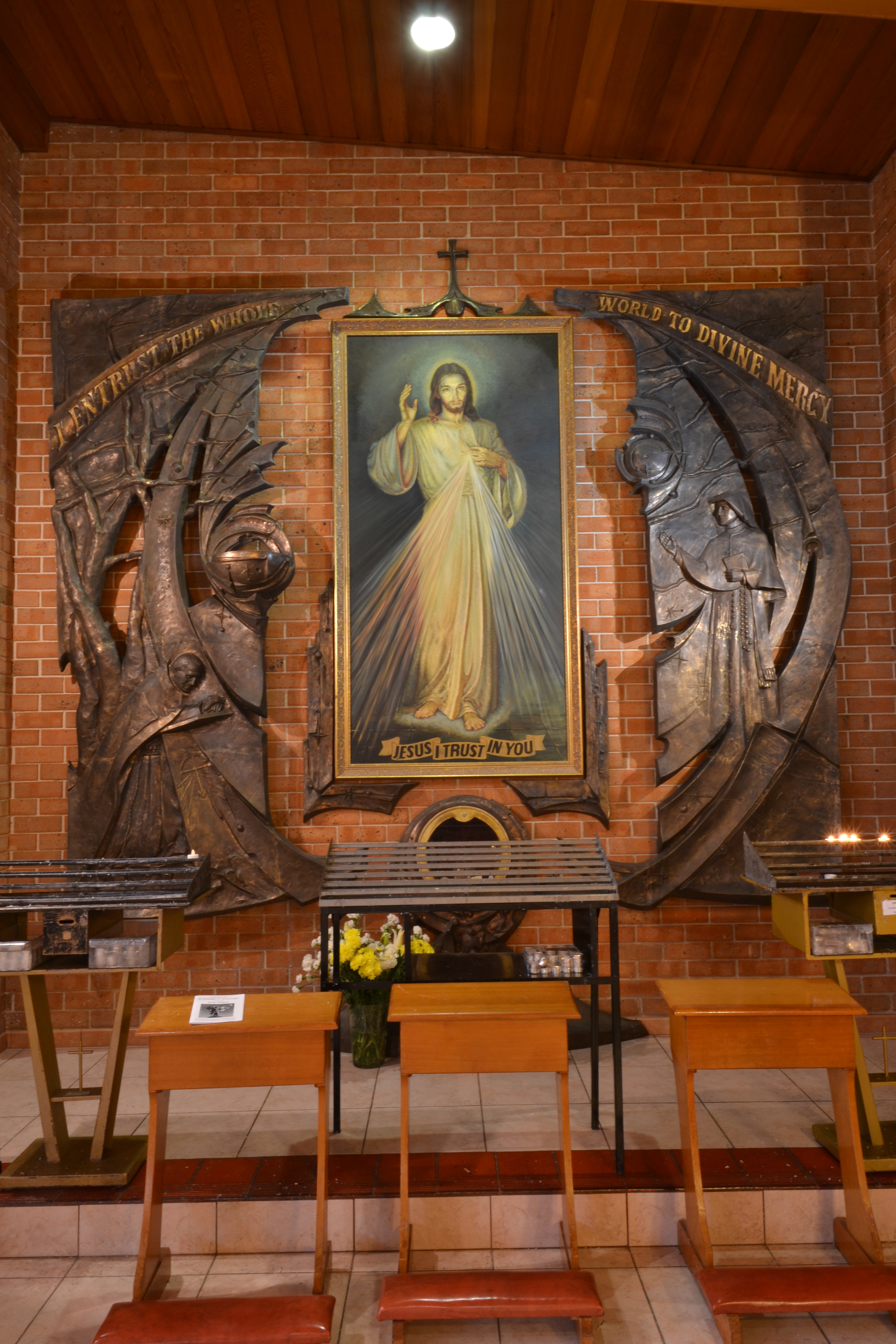
Divine Mercy side chapel

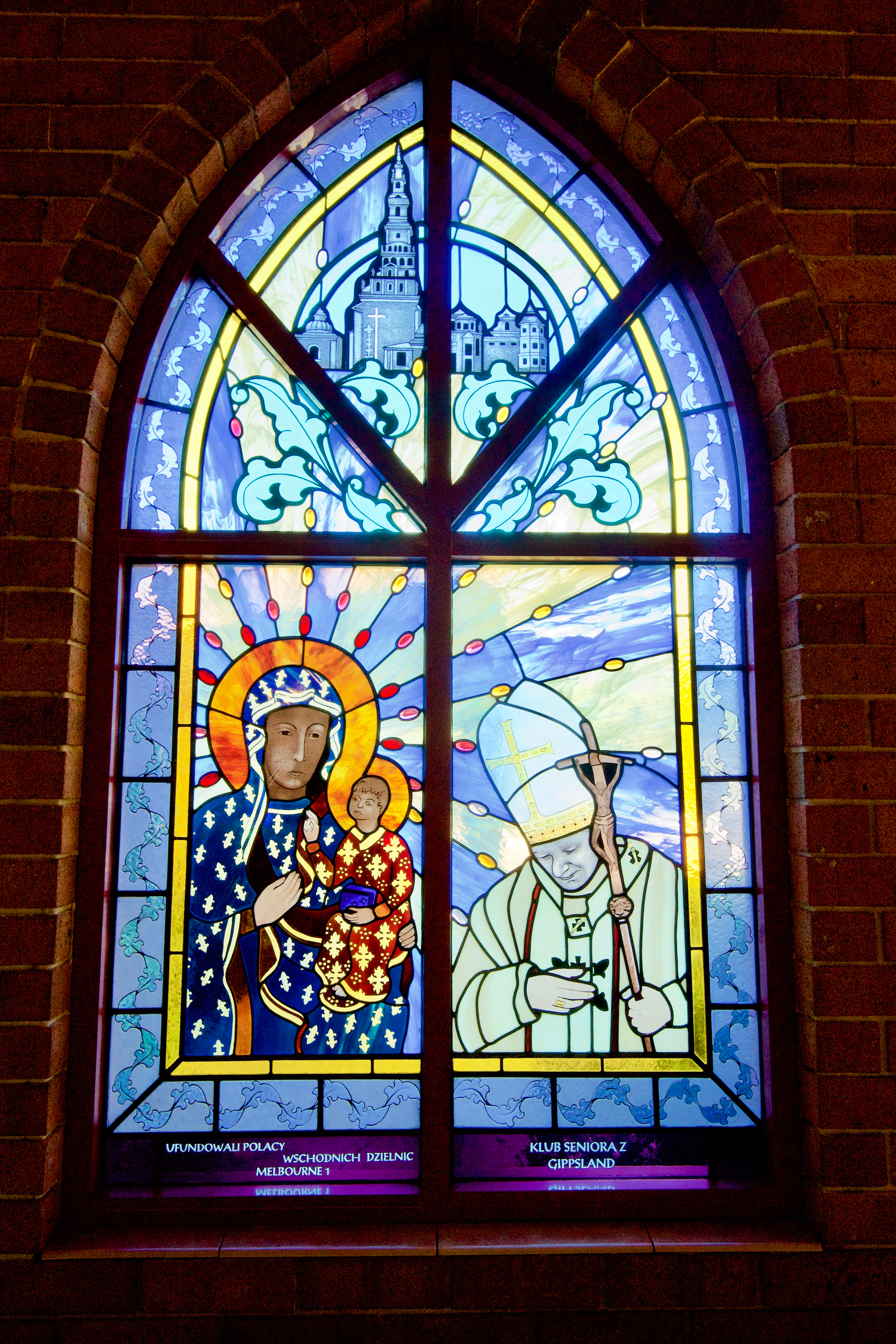
Stain glass window

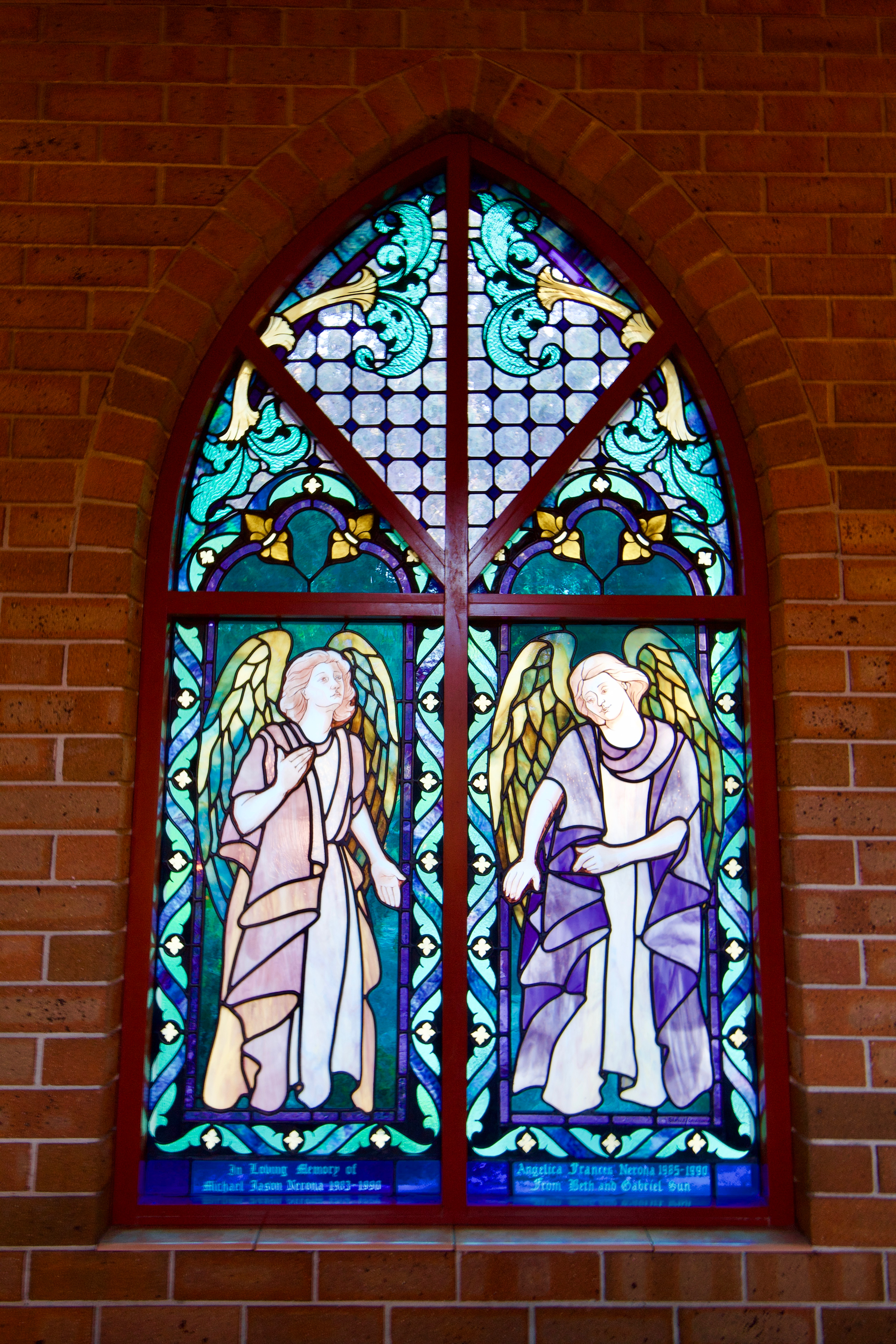
Stain glass window

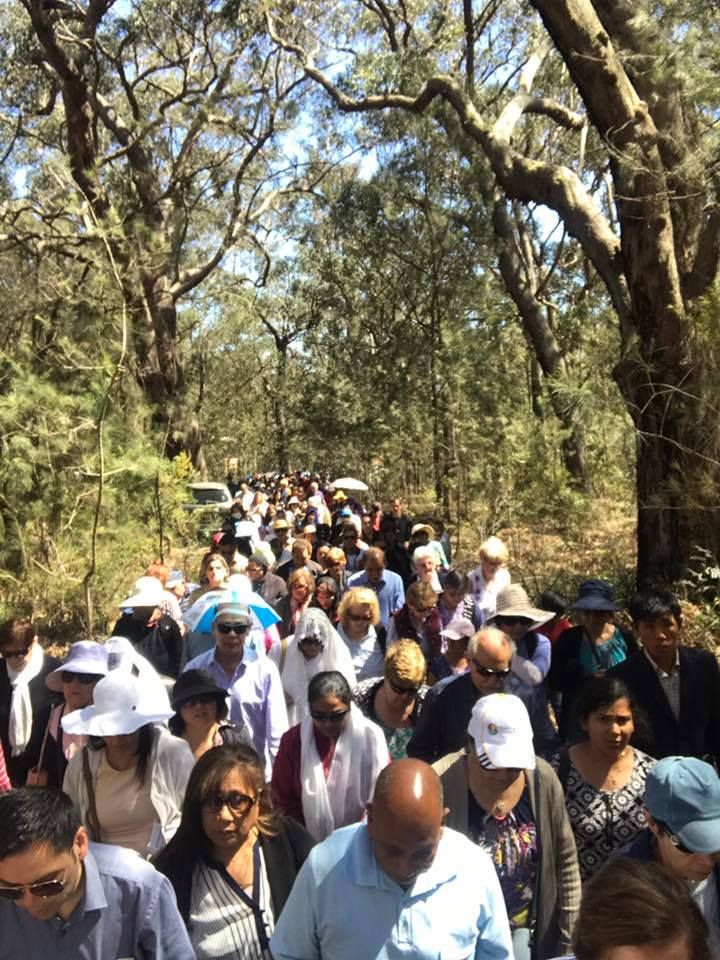
Procession to Grotto

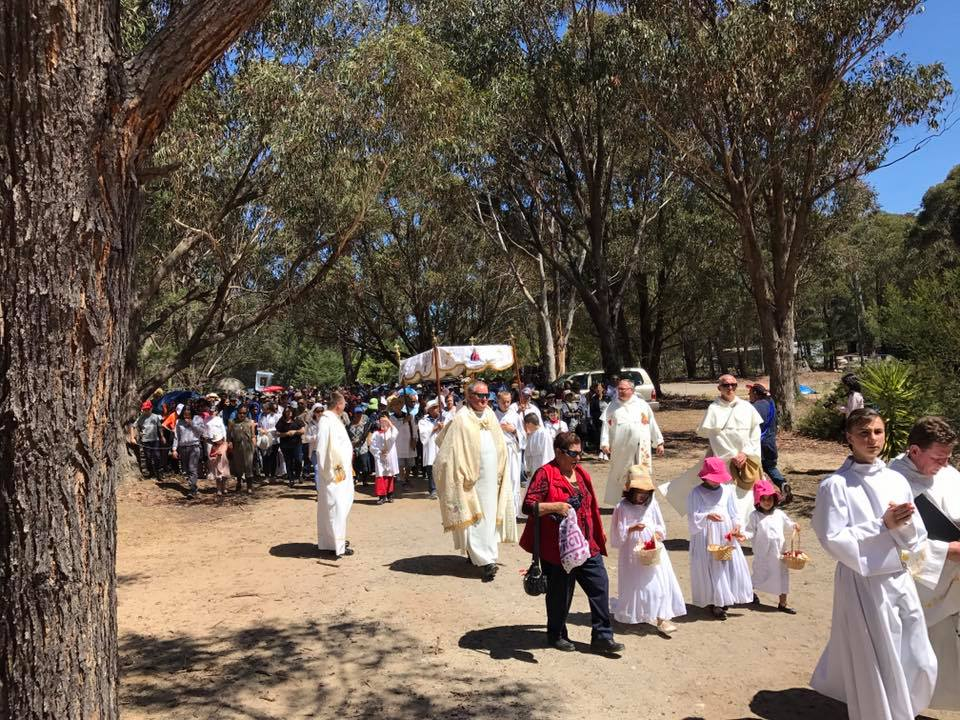
Eucharistic Procession to Grotto

== See also ==
- Shrines to the Virgin Mary
- Black Madonna of Częstochowa
- Jasna Góra Monastery
- Order of Saint Paul the First Hermit
