= The Most Holy Virgin Mary, Queen of Poland =

Polish honorary title for Mary, mother of Jesus

Our Lady Queen of Poland
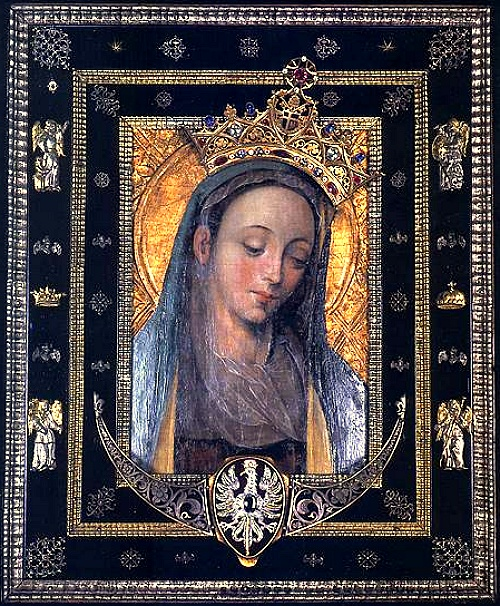
- Our Lady of Rokitno Patiently Listening

The Most Holy Virgin Mary
- Venerated in: Catholic Church in Poland
- Feast: 3 May

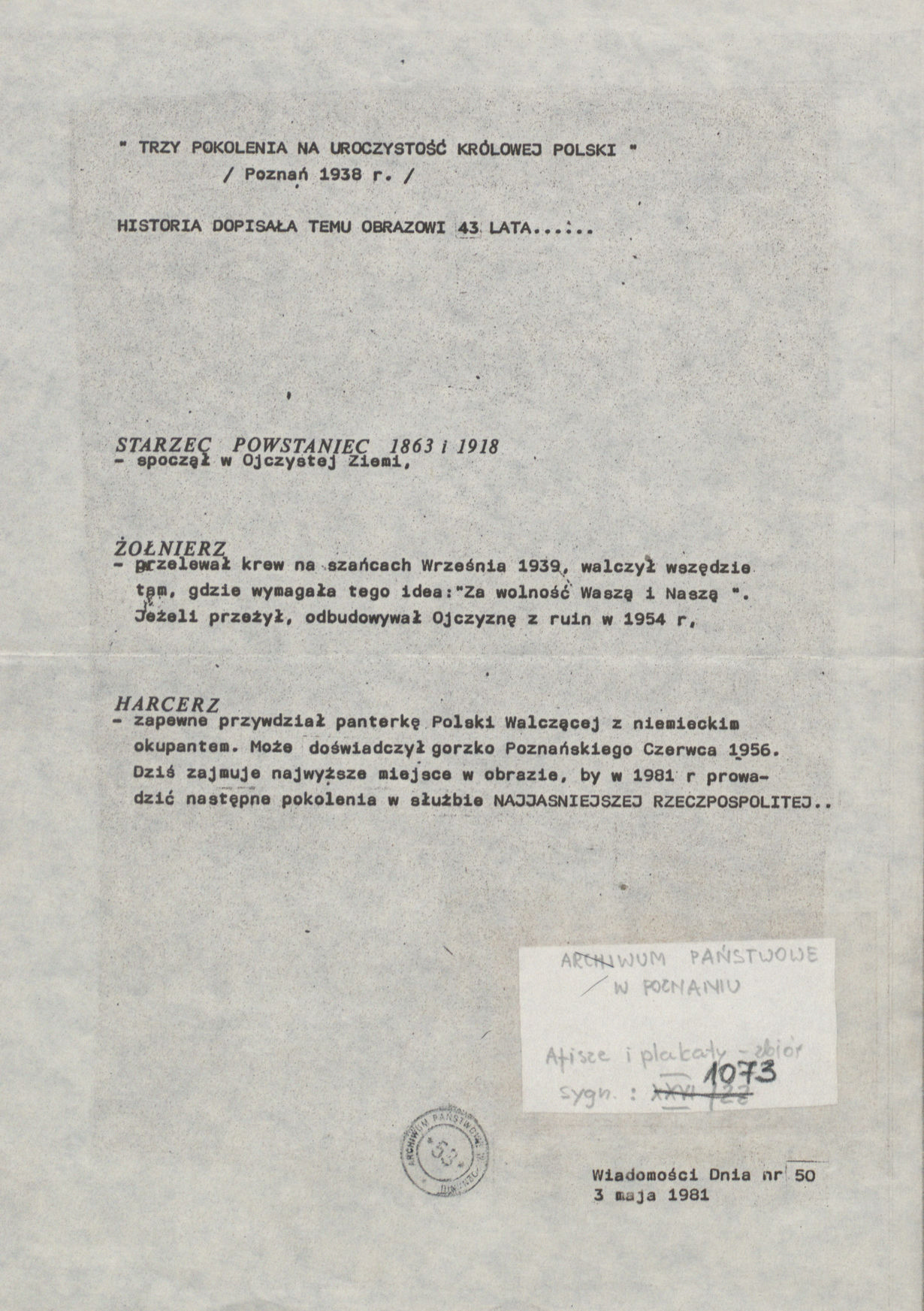
A leaflet for the Solemnity of Queen of the Polish Crown, 1981

The Most Holy Virgin Mary, Queen of Poland (Najświętsza Maryja Panna Królowa Polski; also translated as Our Lady, Queen of Poland or Blessed Virgin Mary, Queen of Poland) is an honorary title for Mary, mother of Jesus, used by Polish Catholics.

The Catholic Church in Poland is singled out by Marian devotions among other Christian denominations in Poland. The cult is universal and very common among Poles, as well as in the Polish diaspora worldwide. The title is associated with the history of Poles. Jan Długosz referred to Mary as Panią świata i naszą (Worldwide and our Lady). The oldest chronicle about the title for Mary as "Mary, Queen of Poland" is dated to the second half of the 16th century. This time Gregor of the Sambor called Mary "Mary, the Queen of Poland and Poles". On 1 April 1656 in Lviv's Cathedral at the Picture of Our Lady of Gracious Lovely Lviv Star John II Casimir Vasa officially vowed: "Ciebie za patronkę moją i za królowę państw moich dzisiaj obieram" (You as my patroness and queen of my nations today I take). On the 300th anniversary of the Lwów Oath, the Polish Episcopacy on Stefan Wyszyński's initiative again codified in whole Mary's country and revitalised royal vows. On 26 August 1956 at Jasna Góra Monastery about one million of Polish ancestors donated Jasna Góra Vows of the Polish Nation.

On 3 May (The day when Constitution of 3 May 1791 is commonly celebrated in Poland), the Polish Catholic Church holds a solemnity called the Feast of the Most Holy Virgin Mary, Queen of Poland.

The Virgin Mary is the first among the three main patron saints of Poland. She is also the main patroness for the Roman Catholic Archdiocese of Częstochowa, the Roman Catholic Archdiocese of Przemyśl and a former patroness of the Roman Catholic Archdiocese of Lviv

== History ==
History of Marian devotions in Poland are related to the Counter-Reformation.

- On 14 August 1608 the Italian Giulio Mancinelli from Society of Jesus, received a revelation of Mary. Mary recommended to him that he called her "Queen of Poland": "Why do you not deem me Queen of Poland? I greatly adored this kingdom and intend great things for it, for its sons feel me a personal love towards me." (A czemu mnie Królową Polski nie zowiesz? Ja to królestwo wielce umiłowałam i wielkie rzeczy dlań zamierzam, ponieważ osobliwą miłością ku Mnie pałają jego synowie.). On a second time on 8 May 1610 Mary revelated for him again, telling him: "I am the Queen of Poland. I am the mother of this nation, which is very dear to me." (Jestem Królową Polski. Jestem matką tego narodu, który jest mi bardzo drogi). Message about this revelation caused developing Marian devotions in Poland. On 15 August 1617, Mary revelated to Giulio Mancinelli again. Grand Chancellor of Lithuania Albrycht Stanisław Radziwiłł and Andrew Bobola spread news about these revelations.
- In 1635 Radziwiłł announced to the world that according to one of members of the Society of Jesus, Mary desired to be a Queen of Poland.

After Naples and Kraków, Vilnius has been a Jesuit-European center of spreading dignity. Our Lady of the Gate of Dawn (1620) has been the first incarnate effect of the revelations.

- In 1640, Cistercians from Bledzew donated to Cisterians of the Marienstern Monastery an icon of the Mother of God with the emblem of Polish kings on her chest.
- On 27 June 1651, John II Casimir Vasa got the Picture of Our Lady of Gracious Lovely Lviv Star from Pope Innocent X.
- Jasna Góra Monastery, according to Catholic tradition, was defended during the Deluge thanks to Mary. The departure of the Swedes from Jasna Góra, of which King John II Casimir learned in Krosno, influenced the naming of the Mother of God the Queen of Poland.
- On 1 April 1656 John II Casimir Vasa (among other bishops during papal legate's presence) submitted his vows before the icon of Our Lady of Gracious Lovely Lviv Star and he celebrated Mary as "Mary, Queen of Poland". During refusing the litany of Loreto Pietro Vidoni phrasing three times: Królowo Korony Polskiej, módl się za nami (Queen of the Polish Crown, pray for us) (a popular type of prayer in Poland) got popularised.
- In 1651 Michał Korybut Wiśniowiecki placed Polish emblem on the wonderful image of Mary at Rokitno's Basilica.
- On 8 September 1717 took place the coronation with papal crowns of the picture of Our Lady of Częstochowa, as the third image with papal rights outside Rome. (First decree given in Croatia, Second decree given in Slovenia.)
- In 1764 Coronation Sejm in the act Forteca Częstochowska referred to Our Lady as "Virgin Mary, the Most Holy Queen of the Commonwealth".
- 25 November 1908, at the request of Józef Bilczewski, Pope Pius X issued a decree confirming the cult, allowing the feast of the Blessed Virgin Mary as the Queen of the Polish Crown and instituted the liturgical feast of the Queen of the Polish Crown for the Archdiocese of Lviv and the Przemyśl diocese, designating it as the first Sunday of May in memory of John II Casimir's vow's.
- On 29 November 1908, Pope Pius X leted for including to Litany of the Blessed Virgin Mary permanent invocation "Królowo Korony Polskiej" for the Lviv and Przemyśl dioceses
- In 1910 Pius X announced Mother of God Queen of the Polish Crown main patroness of Archdiocese of Lviv.
- On 22 May 1910 second coronation with papal crowns – Pius X.
- In 1914 Celebrations has been changed on 2 May.
- 14 January 1920 After receiving two appeals from Polish Episcopacy, Pope Benedict XV expanded the invocation of the Queen of the Polish Crown in the Loreto Litany for the whole of Poland.
- 27 July 1920 Polish Episcopacy due to Polish–Soviet War again picked Mary as "Queen of Poland"
- On 12 October 1923, Sacred Congregation of Rites designated Feast of the Blessed Virgin Mary, Queen of Poland on 3 May and included to Litany of the Blessed Virgin Mary phrasing Queen of the Polish Crown (which after World War II has been changed for "Queen of Poland").
- In 1925 Pope Pius XI expanded the cult of Mary for all dioceses in Poland.
- In 1926 a pilgrimage of Polish women, in thanks for the Battle of Warsaw, offered the Mother of God at Jasna Góra a scepter and an apple as a sign of royal dignity.
- 15 January 1930 the holiday was raised to the rank of first-class with an octave in the diocese of Lviv, Przemyśl. and Częstochowa, which also received its own mass form and office, and in other dioceses it was a second-class holiday.
- On 16 May 1956 (during Andrew Bobola's feast day) cardinal Stefan Wyszyński interneed in Komańcza, wrote revitalisation of Lviv vows which were influential for reparating Poland.
- 26 August 1956 The Polish Episcopacy made the act of renewing the Lviv vows, which 300 years earlier was made by the Polish king Jan II Casimir.
- In 1962, Pope John XXIII, announced Mary as "Patronness of Poland" and Feast of the Blessed Virgin Mary, Queen of Poland became a first-class holiday in all Polish dioceses.
- In 1962 Pope Paul VI (based on Stefan Wyszyński's request) increased custom for ore competitive category celebration.
- On 1 April 2005, Pope John Paul II (one day before his death) offered and blessed new golden crowns for the image of Our Lady the Queen of Poland.

== See also ==
- Queen of Ireland (Virgin Mary)
