= Inline-skating pilgrimages =

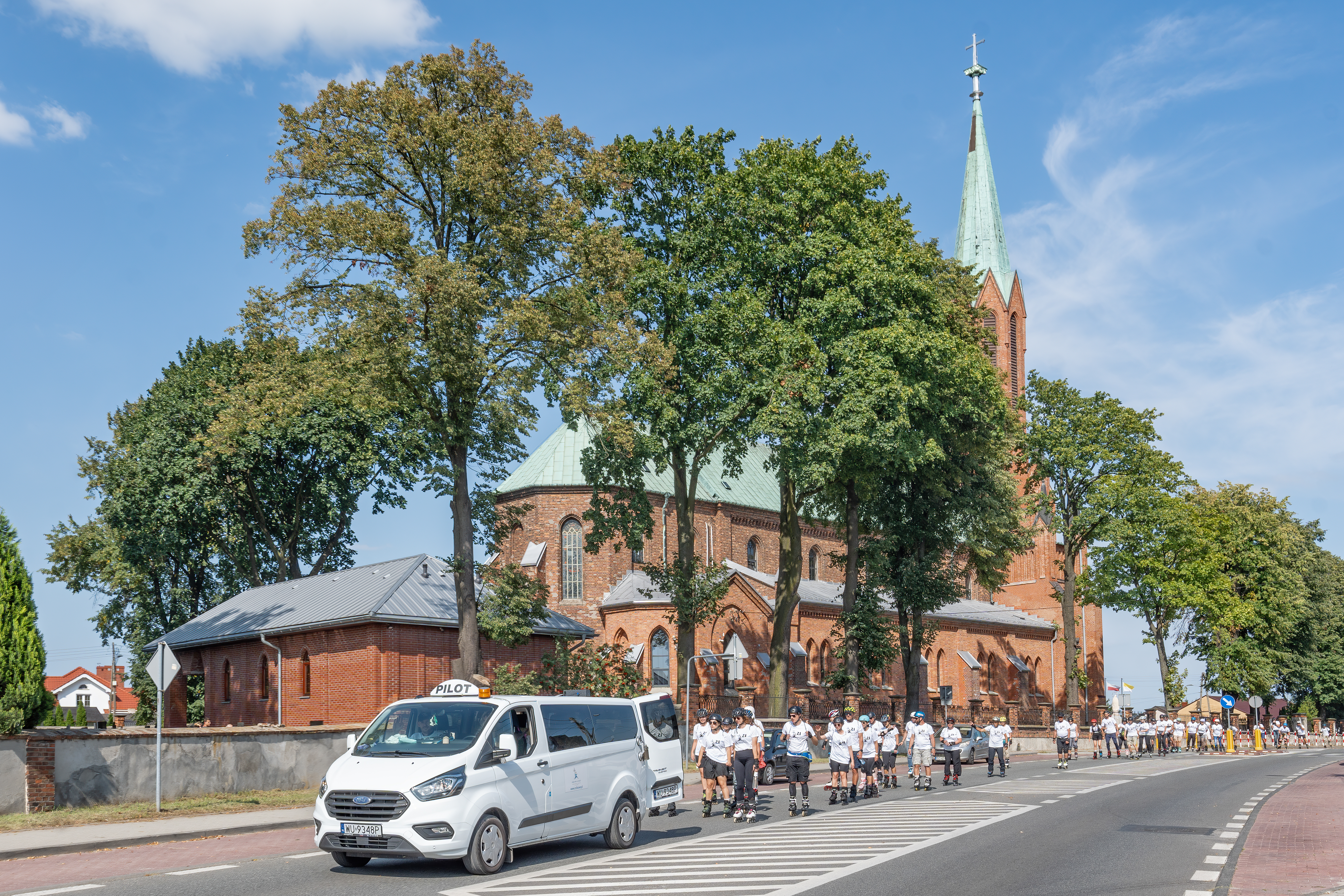
Inline skating pilgrimage from Warsaw to Częstochowa

Inline skating pilgrimage is a form of pilgrimage in which participants travel the route on inline skates. It has gained particular popularity in the Catholic Church in Poland, where two regular pilgrimages to the Jasna Góra shrine in Częstochowa are organised. There are also isolated examples of inline skating pilgrimage initiatives outside Poland, including in India and along sections of the Camino de Santiago.

== History ==
The first recorded inline skating (and roller skating) pilgrimage took place in India in 2000. In Poland the beginnings date back to 2002, when a group of ten skaters set off from Warsaw to Jasna Góra. The initiative was started by Fr Artur Karbowy, who combined physical activity with a spiritual experience. In subsequent years the number of participants steadily increased – in 2024 the 21st edition of the Warsaw pilgrimage took place, with 65 participants.

== Inline skating pilgrimages around the world ==
=== Camino de Santiago ===
In 2020 two Spaniards, Alberto López from Zaragoza and Alberto Alemán from Pamplona, covered on inline skates about 770 km of the Camino de Santiago, treating the challenge as a charity initiative. They completed it in seven days, choosing the so-called French Way (Camino Francés), running through, among others, Roncesvalles, Logroño, Burgos, León, Ponferrada and Sarria.

=== India ===
In the state of Kerala an inline skating pilgrimage to the Sabarimala shrine of Lord Ayyappa has been organised since 2000. Each year members of a skating club from the city of Kollam cover tens or hundreds of kilometres, combining skating with religious practices.

=== Poland ===
==== Warsaw ====
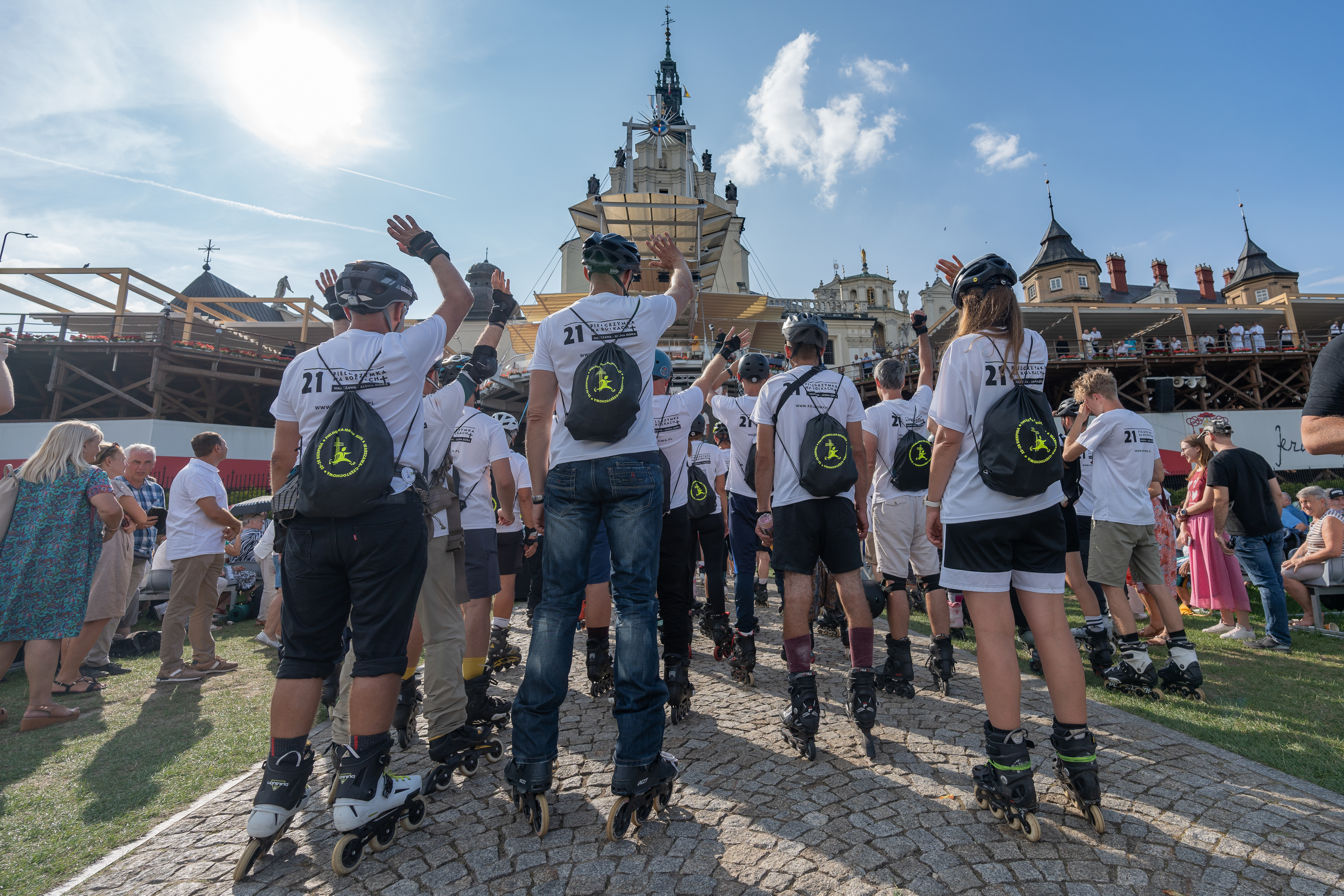
Warsaw inline skating pilgrimage at Jasna Góra

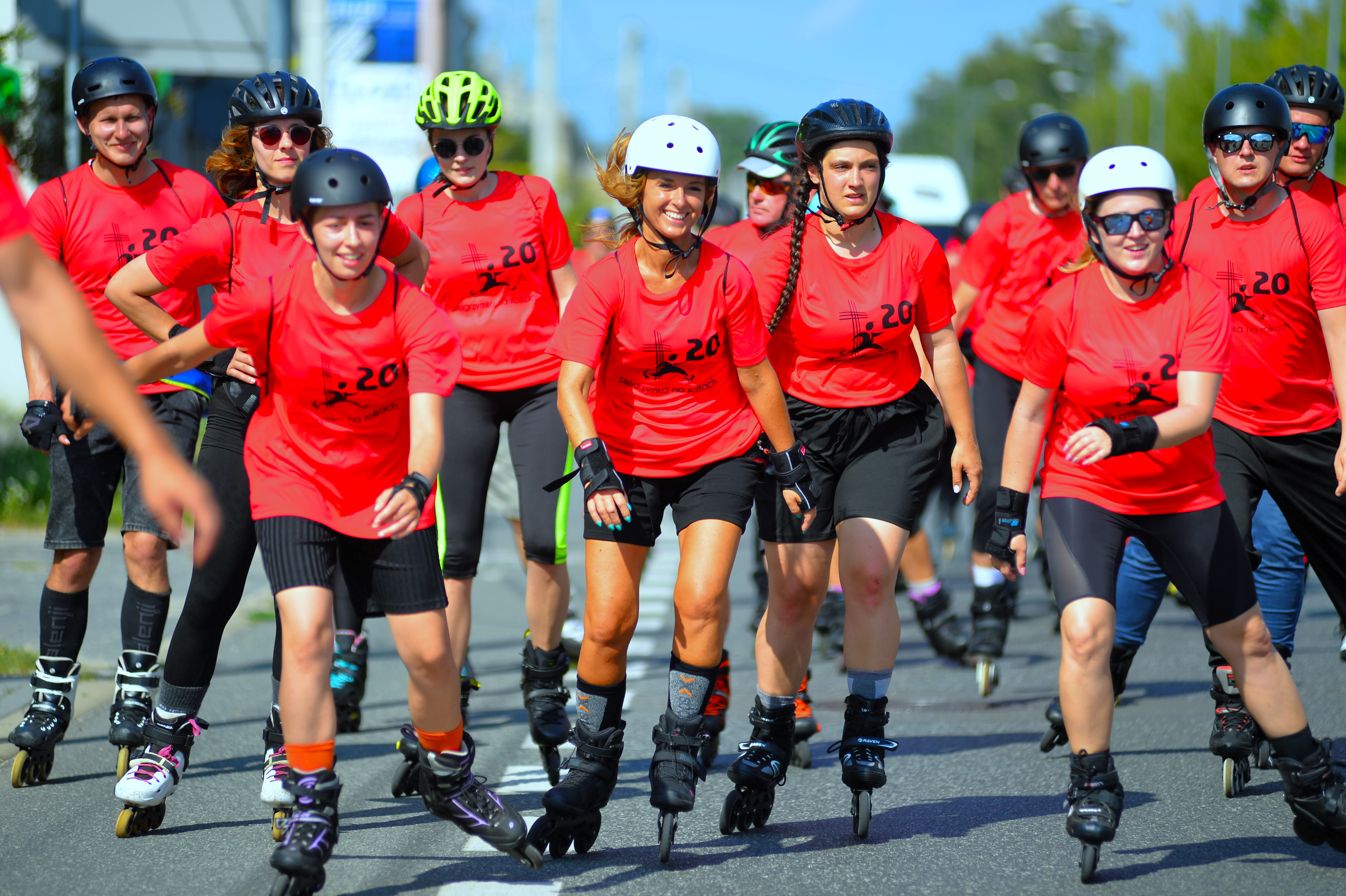
20th Warsaw–Częstochowa inline skating pilgrimage, August 2023

Since 2002 an annual inline skating pilgrimage to Jasna Góra has been organised from Warsaw. Its main organiser is the Congregation of Saint Michael the Archangel (Michaelite Fathers). Participants set off on 22 August (the liturgical Memorial of the Queenship of Mary) and arrive on 26 August (the Solemnity of Our Lady of Częstochowa). The route is about 270–300 km long and is covered in 4–5 days of skating, with daily stages of around 50–75 km. The group is accompanied by support vehicles, and participants take part in daily Mass, prayers and spiritual conferences. In the first years (2002–2004) the group consisted of several to a dozen or so people, but over time it grew systematically. In 2019 about 100 people took part (corresponding to the regulatory limit), and the places on the list of participants were filled within several dozen minutes of registration opening. After the COVID-19 pandemic in Poland the number of participants dropped – by 2024, when the 21st edition took place, 65 pilgrims took part.

==== Wrocław ====
Since 2015 an inline skating pilgrimage from Wrocław to Jasna Góra has been organised. The initiative is supported, among others, by the Salesian Missionary Volunteering "Youth for the World" and the Don Bosco Salesian Schools Complex. The route is about 220 km long and is covered in 3–4 days. In 2023, 40 people took part, including a 10-year-old as the youngest participant. The pilgrimage is combined with a charity campaign, "Kilometry Miłości" ("Kilometres of Love"), supporting mission projects in Africa and the Middle East.

==== Radom ====
In 2016 and 2017 an inline skating pilgrimage was organised from Radom to Częstochowa, with several dozen participants. The route was about 150 km long. To date only two editions of this event have taken place.

=== Katowice and surroundings ===
From 2015 to 2018 inline skating, scooter and bicycle pilgrimages were organised in the Silesian Voivodeship to local sanctuaries, including Piekary Śląskie, Tychy and Bieruń, most often from Katowice. Up to 2016 they were held as part of preparations for World Youth Day. In 2016 a group of more than 100 people covered about 55 km on inline skates and scooters from Katowice to Rudy Raciborskie. In 2016 a "Nightskating" event was also organised on the route Katowice–Kraków (about 120 km) as part of World Youth Day 2016 in order to reach the meeting with Pope Francis. After World Youth Day in Kraków, the event took place only twice more: in 2017 (75 km to the sanctuary in Turza Śląska) and in 2018 from Szczyrk to Bielsko-Biała.

==== Other initiatives in Poland ====
Smaller inline skating pilgrimage initiatives have been undertaken in various dioceses. Examples include: in 2019 an inline skating pilgrimage from Białystok to Sokółka (about 50 km); in 2024 a group of 20 people covered more than 80 km from Drelów to the sanctuary of Our Lady of Kodeń.
