= Władysław Reymont =

Polish novelist (1867–1925)

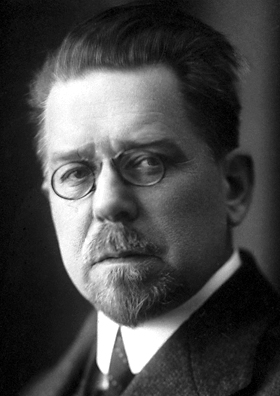
- Reymont in 1924
- Born: Stanisław Władysław Rejment; 7 May 1867; Kobiele Wielkie, Congress Poland, Russian Empire
- Died: 5 December 1925 (aged 58); Warsaw, Poland
- Writing career
- Period: 1896–1924
- Genre: Realism
- Notable works: The Promised Land (1899); The Peasants (1904–1909)
- Notable awards: Nobel Prize in Literature; 1924
- Movement: Young Poland

Signature
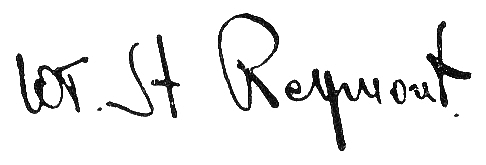

Władysław Stanisław Reymont (Polish: [vwaˈdɨswaf ˈrɛjmɔnt]; born Rejment; 7 May 1867 – 5 December 1925) was a Polish novelist and the laureate of the 1924 Nobel Prize in Literature. His best-known work is the award-winning four-volume novel Chłopi (The Peasants).

Born into an impoverished noble family, Reymont was educated to become a master tailor, but instead worked as a gateman at a railway station and then as an actor in a troupe. His intensive travels and voyages encouraged him to publish short stories, with notions of literary realism. Reymont's first successful and widely praised novel was The Promised Land from 1899, which brought attention to the bewildering social inequalities, poverty, conflictive multiculturalism and labour exploitation in the industrial city of Łódź (Lodz). The aim of the novel was to extensively emphasize the consequences of extreme industrialization and how it affects society as a whole. In 1900, Reymont was severely injured in a railway accident, which halted his writing career until 1904 when he published the first part of Chłopi.

Władysław Reymont was popular in communist Poland due to his style of writing and the symbolism he used, including socialist concepts, romantic portrayal of the agrarian countryside and toned criticism of capitalism, all present in literary realism. His work is widely attributed to the Young Poland movement, which featured decadence and literary impressionism.

== Life ==
Reymont was born in the village of Kobiele Wielkie, near Radomsko, as one of the nine children of Józef Rejment, an organist. His mother, Antonina Kupczyńska, had a talent for story-telling. She descended from the impoverished Polish nobility from the Kraków region. Reymont spent his childhood in Tuszyn, near Łódź, to which his father had moved to work at a wealthier church parish. Reymont was defiantly stubborn; after a few years of education in the local school, he was sent by his father to Warsaw into the care of his eldest sister and her husband to teach him his vocation. In 1885, after passing his examinations and presenting "a tail-coat, well-made", he was given the title of journeyman tailor, his only formal certificate of education.

To his family's annoyance, Reymont did not work a single day as a tailor. Instead, he first ran away to work in a travelling provincial theatre and then returned in the summer to Warsaw for the "garden theatres". Without a penny to his name, he then returned to Tuszyn after a year, and, thanks to his father's connections, he took up employment as a gateman at a railway crossing near Koluszki for 16 rubles a month. He ran away twice more: in 1888 to Paris and London as a medium with a German spiritualist and then again to join a theatre troupe. After his lack of success (he was not a talented actor), he returned home again. Reymont also stayed for a time in Krosnowa near Lipce and for a time considered joining the Pauline Order in Częstochowa. He also lived in Kołaczkowo, where he bought a mansion.

== Work ==
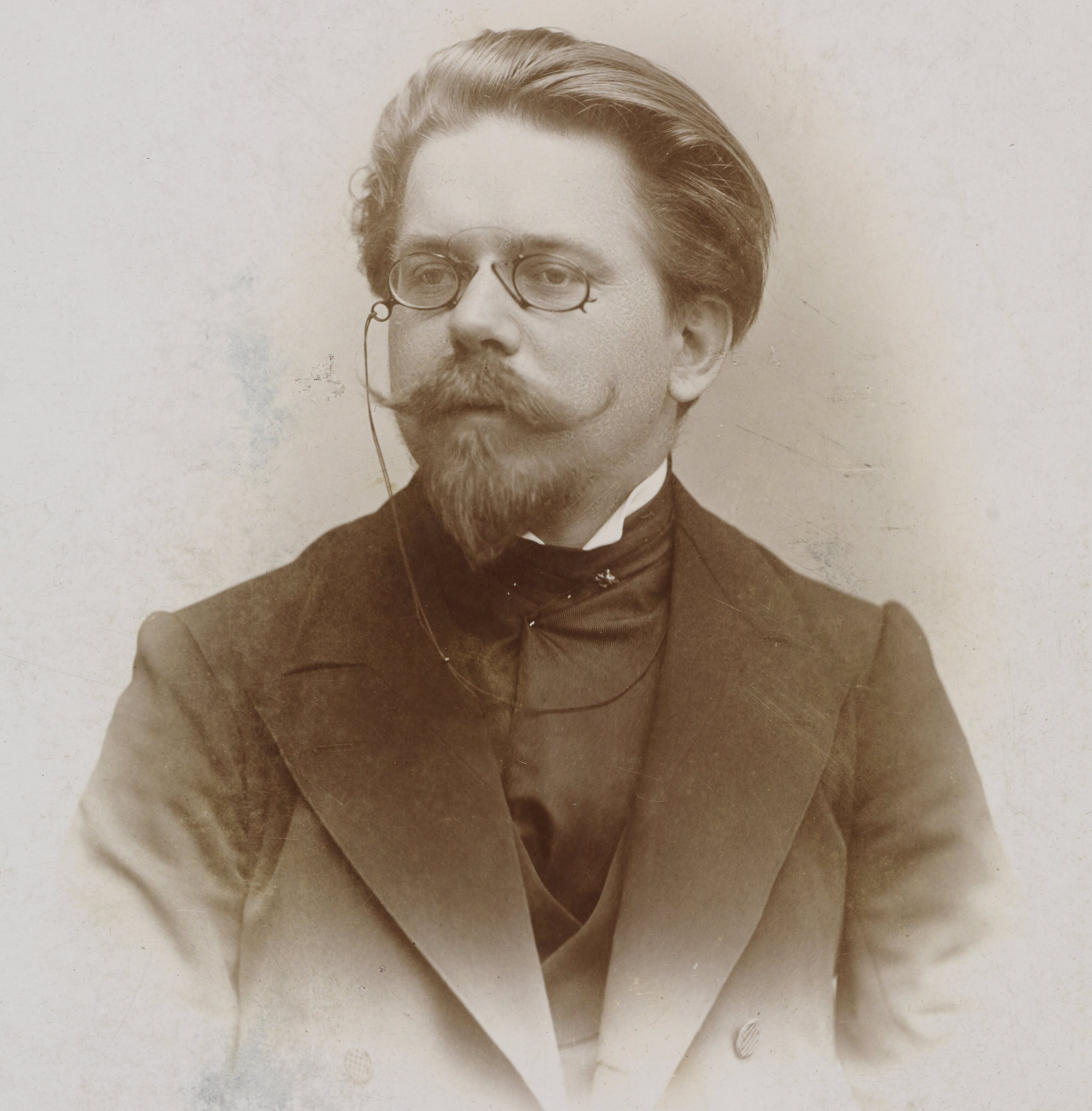
Reymont

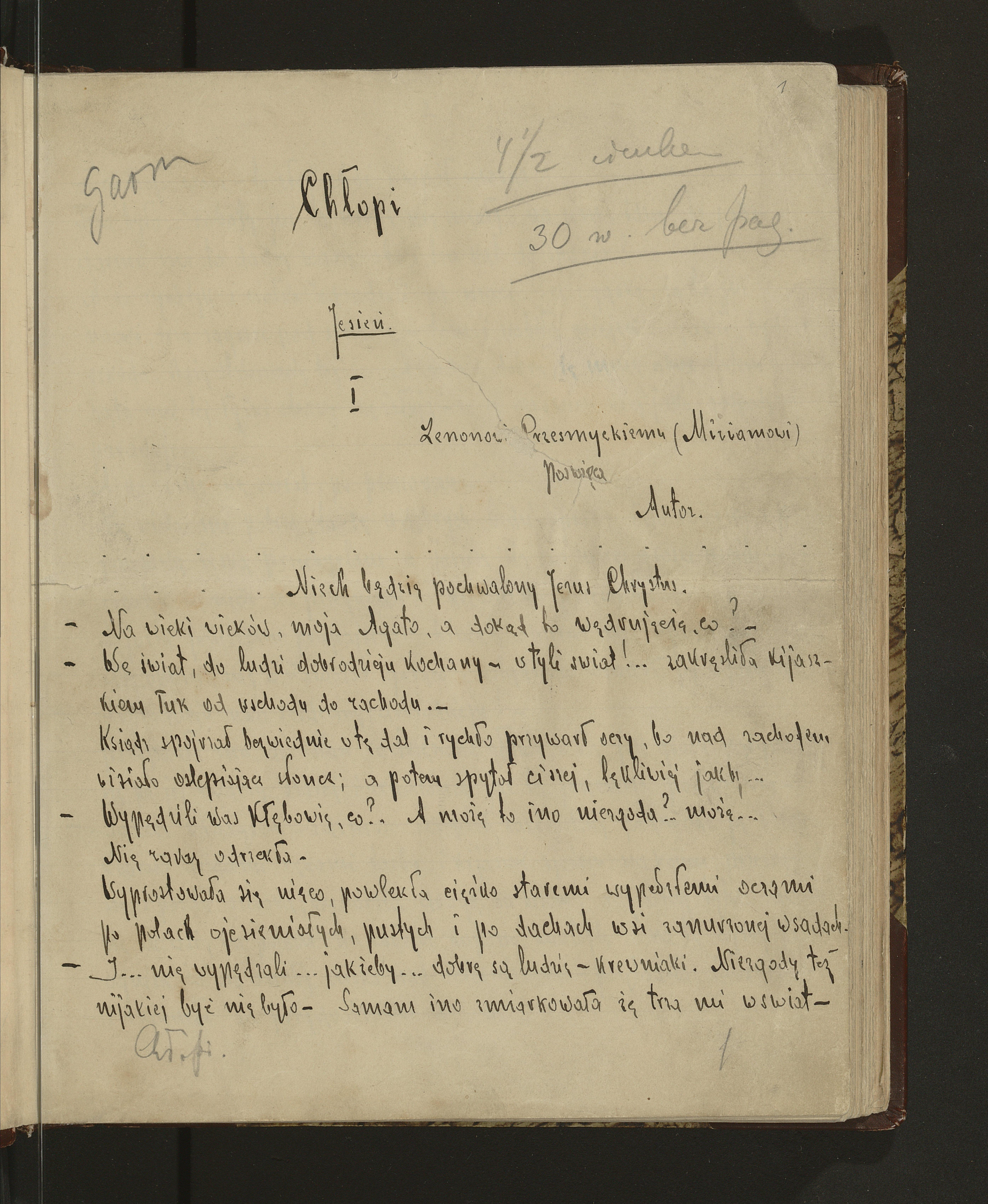
Manuscript of opening of The Peasants: Autumn

When his Korespondencje (Correspondence) from Rogów, Koluszki and Skierniewice was accepted for publication by Głos (The Voice) in Warsaw in 1892, he returned to Warsaw, with several unpublished short stories and just a few rubles. Reymont visited the editorial offices of newspapers and magazines, and eventually met other writers who became interested in his talent including Świętochowski. In 1894 he went on an eleven-day pilgrimage to Częstochowa and turned his experience there into a report entitled "Pielgrzymka do Jasnej Góry" (Pilgrimage to the Luminous Mount) published in 1895, and considered his classic example of travel writing.

Rejmont sent his short stories to different magazines and, encouraged by good reviews, decided to write novels: Komediantka (The Deceiver) (1895) and Fermenty (Ferments) (1896). No longer poor, he would soon satisfy his passion for travel, visiting Berlin, London, Paris, and Italy. Then, he spent a few months in Łódź collecting material for a new novel ordered by the Kurier Codzienny (The Daily Courier) from Warsaw. The earnings from this book Ziemia Obiecana (The Promised Land) (1899) enabled him to go on his next trip to France where he socialized with other exiled Poles (Jan Lorentowicz, Żeromski, Przybyszewski and Lucjan Rydel).

His earnings did not allow for this kind of life of travel. However, in 1900 he was awarded 40,000 rubles in compensation from the Warsaw–Vienna Railway after an accident in which Reymont was severely injured. During the treatment he was looked after by Aurelia Szacnajder Szabłowska, whom he married in 1902, having first paid for the annulment of her earlier marriage. Thanks to her discipline, he marginally restrained his travel-mania, but never gave up either his stays in France (where he partly wrote Chłopi between 1901 and 1908) or in Zakopane. Rejmont also journeyed to the United States in 1919 at the (Polish) government's expense. Despite his ambitions to become a landowner, which led to an unsuccessful attempt to manage an estate he bought in 1912 near Sieradz, the life of the land proved not to be for him. He would later buy a mansion in Kołaczkowo near Poznań in 1920, but still spent his winters in Warsaw or France.

== Nobel Prize ==
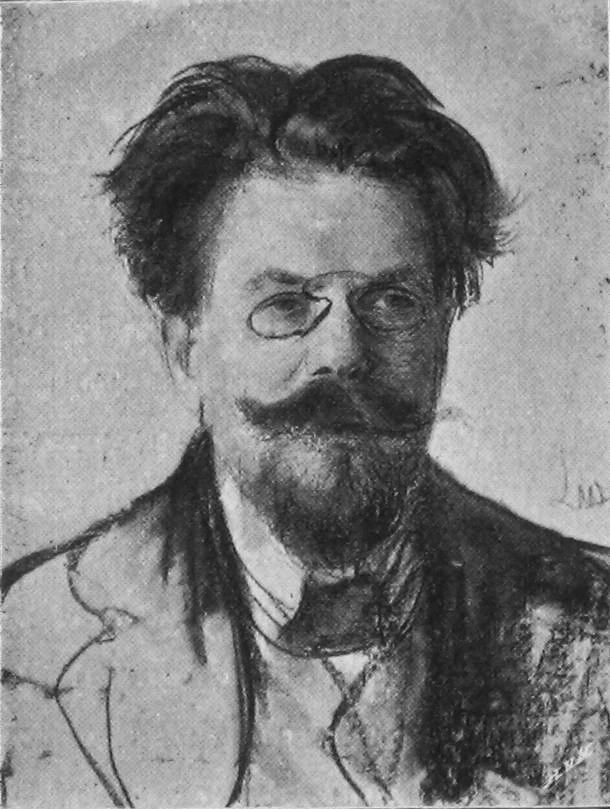
Reymont, by Wyczółkowski

In November 1924 he was awarded the Nobel Prize for Literature over rivals Thomas Mann, George Bernard Shaw and Thomas Hardy, after he had been nominated by Anders Österling, member of the Swedish Academy. Public opinion in Poland supported this recognition for Stefan Żeromski, but the prize went to the author of Chłopi. Żeromski was reportedly refused for his allegedly anti-German sentiments. However, Reymont could not take part in the award ceremony in Sweden due to a heart condition. The award and the check for 116,718 Swedish kronor were sent to Reymont in France, where he was being treated.

In 1925, somewhat recovered, he went to a farmers' meeting in Wierzchosławice near Kraków, where Wincenty Witos welcomed him as a member of the Polish People's Party "Piast" and praised his writing skills. Soon afterward, Reymont's health deteriorated. He died in Warsaw in December 1925 and was buried in the Powązki Cemetery. The urn holding his heart was laid in a pillar of the Holy Cross Church in Warsaw.

Reymont's literary output includes about 30 extensive volumes of prose. There are works of reportage: Pielgrzymka do Jasnej Góry (Pilgrimage to Jasna Góra) (1894), Z ziemi chełmskiej (From the Chełm Lands) (1910 – about the persecutions of the Uniates), Z konstytucyjnych dni (From the Days of the Constitution) (about the revolution of 1905). Also, there are some sketches from the collection Za frontem (Beyond the Front) (1919) and numerous short stories on life in the theatre and the village or on the railway: "Śmierć" ("Death") (1893), "Suka" ("Bitch") (1894), "Przy robocie" ("At Work") and "W porębie" ("In the Clearing") (1895), "Tomek Baran" (1897), "Sprawiedliwie" ("Justly") (1899) and a sketch for a novel Marzyciel (Dreamer) (1908). There are also novels: Komediantka, Fermenty, Ziemia obiecana, Chłopi, Wampir (The Vampire) (1911), which were sceptically received by the critics, and a trilogy written in the years 1911–1917: Rok 1794 (1794) (Ostatni Sejm Rzeczypospolitej, Nil desperandum and Insurekcja) (The Last Parliament of the Commonwealth, Nil desperandum and Insurrection).

== Major books ==
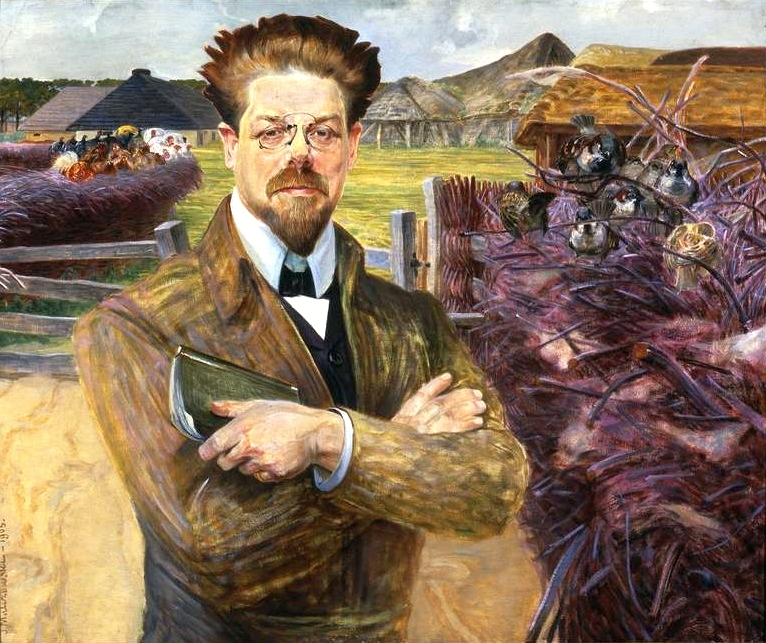
Portrait of Władysław Reymont, 1905, by Jacek Malczewski

Critics admit a number of similarities between Reymont and the Naturalists. They stress that this was not a "borrowed" Naturalism but rather a record of life as experienced by the writer. Moreover, Reymont never formulated an aesthetic of his writing. In that, he resembled other Polish autodidacts such as Mikołaj Rej and Aleksander Fredro. With little higher education and inability to read another language, Reymont realized that it was his knowledge of grounded reality, not literary theory, that was his strong suit.

His novel Komediantka paints the drama of a rebellious girl from the provinces who joins a traveling theatre troupe and finds, instead of escape from the mendacity of her native surroundings, a nest of intrigue and sham. In Fermenty, a sequel to Komediantka, the heroine, rescued after a suicide attempt, returns to her family and accepts the burden of existence. Aware that dreams and ideas do not come true, she marries a nouveau riche who is in love with her.

Ziemia Obiecana (The Promised Land), possibly Reymont's best-known novel, is a social panorama of the city of Łódź during the industrial revolution, full of dramatic detail, presented as an arena of the struggle for survival. In the novel, the city destroys those who accept the rules of the "rat race", as well as those who do not. The moral gangrene equally affects the three main characters, a German, a Jew, and a Pole. This dark vision of cynicism, illustrating the bestial qualities of men and the law of the jungle, where ethics, noble ideas and holy feelings turn against those who believe in them, are, as the author intended, at the same time a denunciation of industrialisation and urbanisation.

Ziemia Obiecana has been translated into at least 15 languages and two film adaptations—one in 1927, directed by A. Węgierski and Aleksander Hertz, the other, in 1975, directed by Andrzej Wajda.

In Chłopi, Reymont created a more complete and suggestive picture of country life than any other Polish writer. The novel impresses the reader with its authenticity of the material reality, customs, behaviour and spiritual culture of the people. It is authentic and written in the local dialect. Reymont uses dialect in dialogues and in narration, creating a kind of a universal language of Polish peasants. Thanks to this, he presents the colourful reality of the "spoken" culture of the people better than any other author. He set the action in Lipce, a real village which he came to know during his work on the railway near Skierniewice, and restricted the time of events to ten months in the unspecified "now" of the 19th century. It is not history that determines the rhythm of country life, but the "unspecified time" of eternal returns. The composition of the novel astonishes the reader with its strict simplicity and functionality.

The titles of the volumes signal a tetralogy in one vegetational cycle, which regulates the eternal and repeatable rhythm of village life. Parallel to that rhythm is a calendar of religion and customs, also repeatable. In such boundaries Reymont placed a colourful country community with sharply drawn individual portraits. The repertoire of human experience and the richness of spiritual life, which can be compared with the repertoire of Biblical books and Greek myths, has no doctrinal ideas or didactic exemplifications. The author does not believe in doctrines, but rather in his knowledge of life, the mentality of the people described, and his sense of reality. It is easy to point to moments of Naturalism (e.g., some erotic elements) or to illustrative motives characteristic of Symbolism. It is equally easy to prove the Realistic values of the novel. None of the "isms" however, would be enough to describe it. The novel was filmed twice (directed by E. Modzelewski in 1922 and by J. Rybkowski in 1973) and has been translated into at least 27 languages.

== Revolt ==
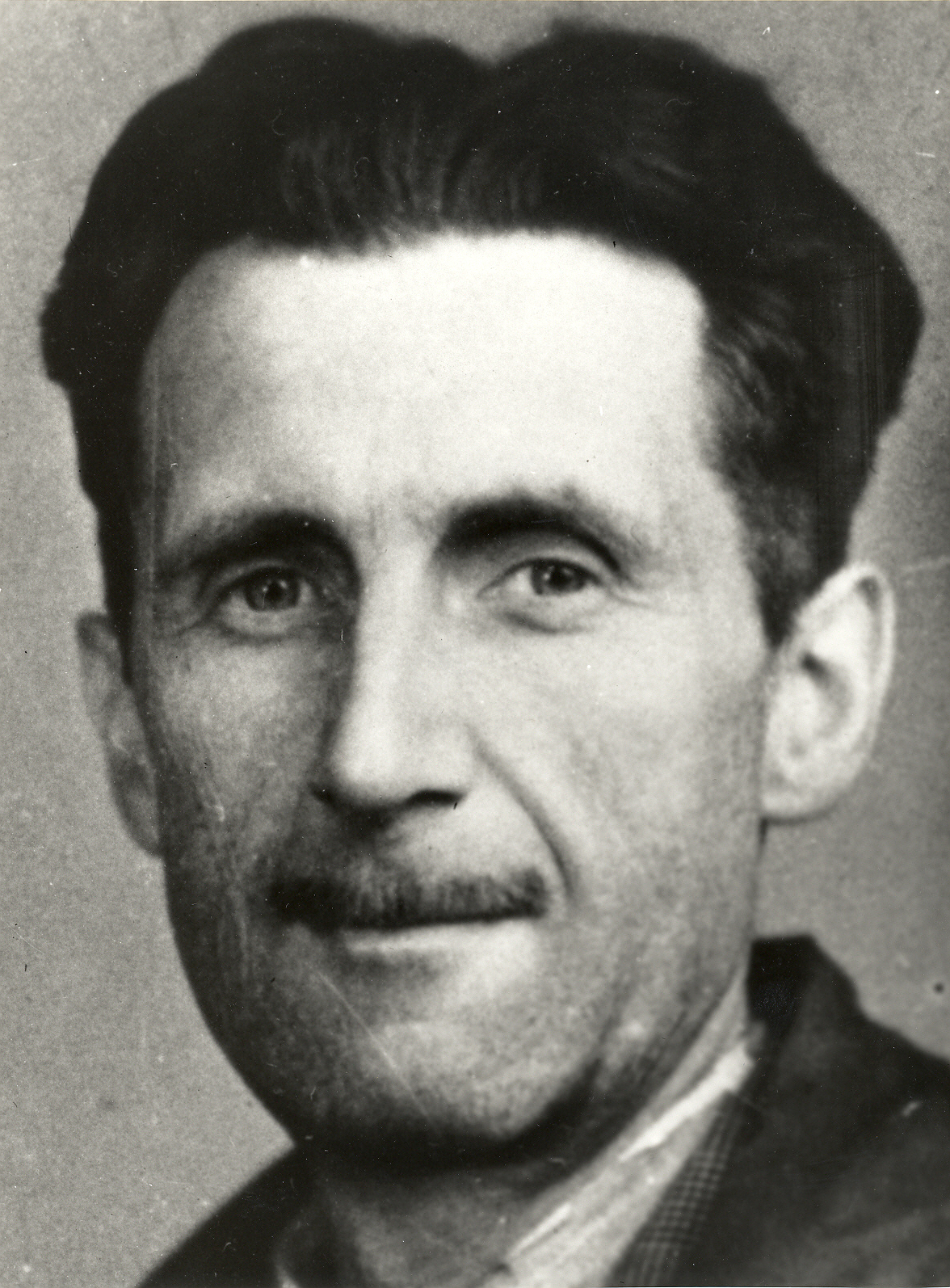
George Orwell

Reymont's last book, Bunt (Revolt), serialized in 1922 and published in book form in 1924, describes a revolt by animals which take over their farm in order to introduce "equality". The revolt quickly degenerates into abuse and bloody terror.

The story was a metaphor for the Bolshevik Revolution of 1917 and was banned from 1945 to 1989 in communist Poland, along with George Orwell's similar novella, Animal Farm (published in Britain in 1945). Reymont's novel was reprinted in Poland in 2004.

== Works ==
=== Novels ===
- Pielgrzymka do Jasnej Góry (A Pilgrimage to Jasna Góra, 1895)
- Komediantka (The Deceiver, 1896)
- Fermenty (Ferments, 1897)
- Ziemia obiecana (The Promised Land, 1898)
- Lili : żałosna idylla (Lily: A Pathetic Idyll 1899)
- Sprawiedliwie (Justly, 1899)
- Chłopi (The Peasants, 1904–1909), Nobel Prize for Literature, 1924
- Marzyciel (The Dreamer, 1910),
- Rok 1794 (1794, 1914–1919)
  - Part I: Ostatni Sejm Rzeczypospolitej (The Last Sejm of the Republic)
  - Part II: Nil desperandum! (Never Despair!)
  - Part III: Insurekcja (The Uprising), about the Kościuszko Uprising
- Wampir – powieść grozy (The Vampire, 1911)
- Przysiega (Oaths, 1917)
- Bunt (The Revolt, 1924)

=== Short fiction ===
- Na Krawędzi: Opowiadania (On the Edge, 1907) - collection
- Z ziemi chełmskiej. Wrażenia i notatki (From the Chełm Land. Impressions and Notes, 1916) - short story
- Legenda (Legend, 1924) - short story
- Śmierć (Death, 1923) - novella

=== English translations ===
- The Comédienne (Komediantka) translated by Edmund Obecny (1920)
- The Peasants (Chłopi) translated by Michael Henry Dziewicki (1924–1925); translated by Anna Zaranko (2022)
- The Promised Land (Ziemia obiecana) translated by Michael Henry Dziewicki (1927)
- Polish Folklore Stories (1944)
- Burek The Dog That Followed the Lord Jesus and Other Stories (1944)
- A Pilgrimage to Jasna Góra (Pielgrzymka do Jasnej Góry) translated by Filip Mazurczak (2020)
- The Revolt of the Animals (Bunt) translated by Charles S. Kraszewski (2022)
- The Vampire (Wampir) translated by Filip Mazurczak (2026)

== See also ==
- Fable
- Young Poland
- List of Polish writers
- List of Polish Nobel laureates
