= The Promised Land (novel) =

1899 novel by Władysław Reymont

Ziemia obiecana
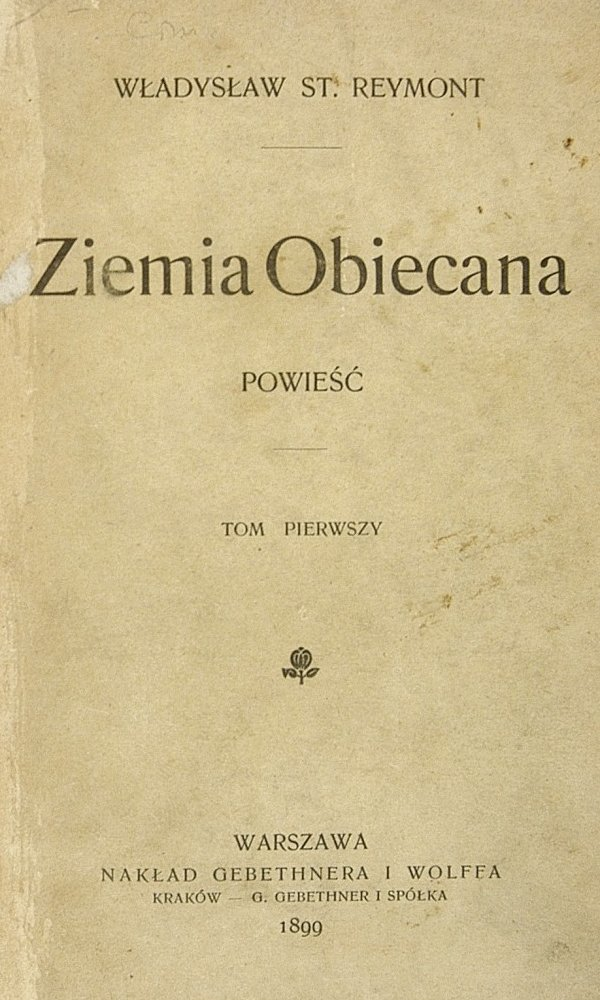
- Front page, first edition print
- Author: Władysław Reymont
- Language: Polish
- Genre: Novel
- Publisher: Gebethner i Wolff
- Publication date: 1899
- Publication place: Kingdom of Poland
- Followed by: The Peasants

The Promised Land (Polish: Ziemia obiecana, Polish pronunciation: [ˈʑɛmʲa ɔbʲɛˈt͡sana]) is an 1899 novel by the Polish author and Nobel laureate, Władysław Reymont; first published in Warsaw. It is considered one of his most important works after The Peasants. The novel The Promised Land was originally published as installments in the industrial city of Łódź by the daily Kurier Codzienny from 1897 to 1898.

Set in Łódź, The Promised Land tells the story of three close friends and ruthless young industrialists: a Pole, a German and a Jew, struggling to build their own factory in the heartless world of the late 19th century labour exploitation. Reymont's novel vividly paints a portrait of the rapid industrialization of Łódź and its cruel effects on workers and mill owners. Reymont writes: "For that 'promised land' – for that tumor – villages were deserted, forests died out, the land was depleted of its treasures, the rivers dried up, people were born. And it sucked everything into itself. And in its powerful jaws it crushed and chewed up people and things, sky and earth, in return giving useless millions to a handful of people, and hunger and hardship to the whole throng". It was translated into English by Michael Henry Dziewicki in 1927.

== Plot summary ==
Karol Borowiecki, a Polish nobleman, is the managing engineer at the Bucholz textile factory. With the help of his friends Max Baum, a German who is the heir to an old handloom factory, and Moritz Welt, an independent Jewish businessman, they embark on setting up their own brand new textile plant.

Borowiecki's affair with Lucy Zucker, the wife of another textile magnate, gives him advance notice of a change in cotton tariffs and helps Welt to make a killing on the Hamburg futures market. However, more money has to be found so all three characters cast aside their pride to raise the necessary capital.

On the day of the factory opening, Borowiecki has to deny his affair with Zucker's wife to a jealous husband. But while Borowiecki accompanies Lucy on her exile to Berlin, there is a fire in the factory, which leaves Borowiecki bankrupt. The same night his father dies. Subsequently, Borowiecki decides to break up with Anka and marry Mada Mueller the daughter of a wealthy German industrialist.

== Adaptations ==
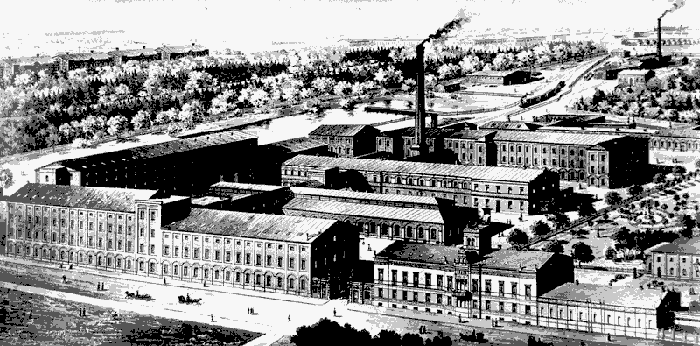
Karol Scheibler's factory in Łódź. In the 19th century the city experienced a rapid period of industrialization.

- Ziemia obiecana (1927 film)
- Ziemia obiecana, The Promised Land (1975 film)
- Ziemia obiecana (TV series), 1978

== See also ==
- Polish literature
- Industrial Revolution
- The Brothers Ashkenazi by Israel Joshua Singer
