= A Pilgrimage to Jasna Góra =

Pielgrzymka do Jasnej Góry
- Author: Władysław Reymont
- Original title: 'Pielgrzymka do Jasnej Góry'
- Language: Polish
- Genre: Reportage
- Publisher: Gebethner i Wolff
- Publication date: 1895
- Publication place: Poland
- Media type: Print

Pielgrzymka do Jasnej Góry (A Pilgrimage to Jasna Góra) is a work of reportage by Polish writer Władysław Reymont, based on a walking pilgrimage to the Jasna Góra Monastery that began on 5 May 1894. It was first published in book form in 1895. An English translation, titled A Pilgrimage to Jasna Góra, by Filip Mazurczak, appeared in 2020.

== Background ==
The 1894 pilgrimage was intended not only as a religious event but also as a covert patriotic demonstration marking the centenary of the Kościuszko Uprising. Reymont, then a beginning writer, was persuaded to join the pilgrimage and prepare a journalistic account of it by Aleksander Świętochowski, who at the time worked for the Warsaw periodical Prawda.

== Characteristics ==
Reymont's work displays the genre features of reportage, although the term itself was not yet in common use at the time. It is written in the first person and combines the narrator's reflections on the events in which he participates with character sketches of individual pilgrims and sociological observations about the pilgrimage as a mass phenomenon. In its language layer, the text contains elements characteristic of the Young Poland (Młoda Polska) style, as well as devices associated with the folk gawęda tradition. Reymont also makes use of impressionistic techniques, for example in his evocation of church music.

== Reception ==
Reymont's reportage was received favourably and brought wider attention to the young author. A multi-part review by Ludwik Krzywicki published in Prawda was particularly important in this respect; in it the critic praised Reymont's talent and his sociological insights.
