= Pilgrimage to Jasna Góra =

Catholic pilgrimage in Poland

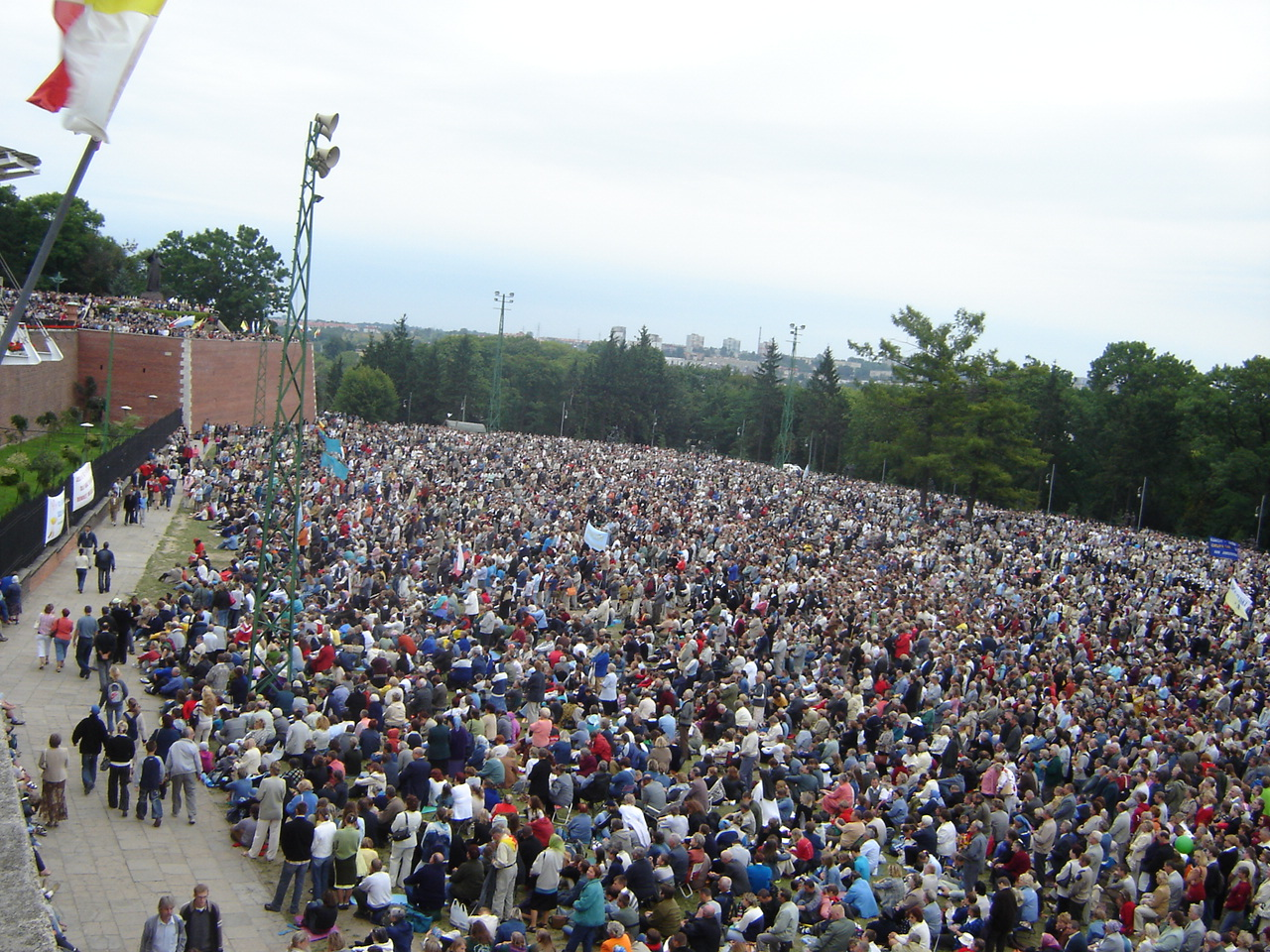
Participants in the celebrations of the Solemnity of the Assumption of the Blessed Virgin Mary at Jasna Góra in 2005

Pilgrimage to Jasna Góra (Polish: pielgrzymka na Jasną Górę) is a pilgrimage in the Catholic Church in Poland whose destination is the Jasna Góra Monastery in Częstochowa. Since the 15th century this has been the most frequently visited pilgrimage site in Poland. In 2003 the sanctuary was visited by 4 million pilgrims from 80 countries, of whom almost 800,000 arrived in 120 nationwide pilgrimages. In 2022 seven non-motorised pilgrimages departed from Warsaw alone. In 2022 the press office of Jasna Góra reported that between 4 June and 14 August, 50,500 people arrived at the Marian sanctuary in 139 organised pilgrimages on foot, and almost 7,000 people in 220 bicycle pilgrimages. In 2023 the total number of visitors was about 3.6 million pilgrims: 228 walking pilgrimages, 200 bicycle groups, 17 running groups, 2 inline-skating pilgrimages and 1 horseback pilgrimage arrived at Jasna Góra.

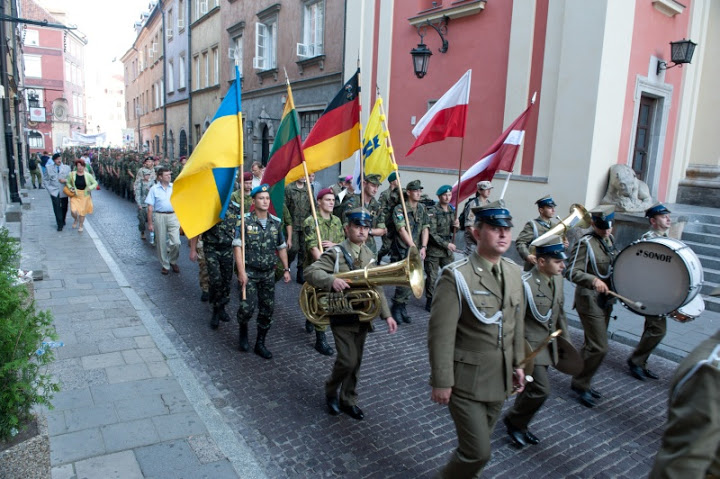
Pilgrimages in 2013

Most pilgrims arrive on foot, in organised groups. Some of them, such as the Warsaw Walking Pilgrimage (Polish: Warszawska Pielgrzymka Piesza), have a tradition going back several hundred years. Walking pilgrimages to Jasna Góra set out from many Polish cities, mainly in the summer. They most often arrive in Częstochowa for the Solemnity of the Assumption of the Blessed Virgin Mary (15 August) or for the feast of Our Lady of Częstochowa (26 August). These are multi-day pilgrimages; the walk from Warsaw to Jasna Góra takes about ten days. In 2019 around 125,000 people took part in walking pilgrimages to Jasna Góra, of whom about 87,000 arrived before 15 August and 37,000 before 26 August.

The longest walking pilgrimage in Poland, in terms of distance covered, is the Kashubian pilgrimage, organised annually since 1982, which is 638 km long, lasts 19 days (25 July–12 August) and follows the route: Hel – Swarzewo – Wejherowo – Sianowo – Szymbark – Stare Polaszki – Lubichowo – Lipinki – Świecie – Nawra – Toruń – Sędzin – Morzyczyn – Koło – Dobra – Sieradz – Rychłocice – Ożegów – Miedźno – Jasna Góra.

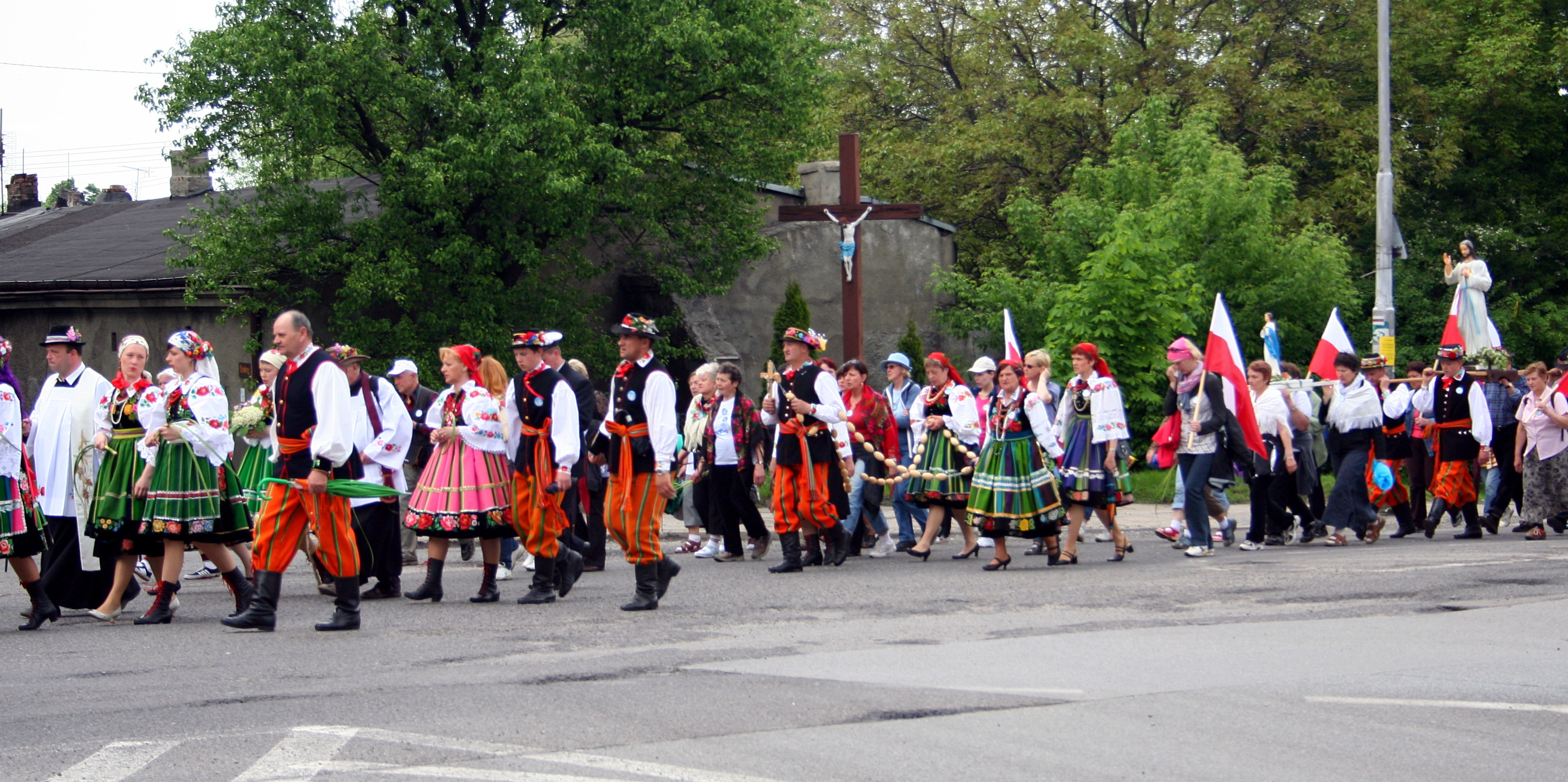
Łowicz pilgrimage in 2010

According to data for 2024, the most numerous groups included the pilgrimage of the Family of Radio Maryja, the Renewal in the Holy Spirit movement, farmers, workers, postal workers and Alcoholics Anonymous groups. Among the pilgrimages that arrived by various means of transport, parish pilgrimages were the most numerous – almost 2,500 such groups visited Jasna Góra in 2024. Among diocesan groups, pilgrims from the dioceses of Radom, Tarnów, Dąbrowa Basin and Łódź predominated.

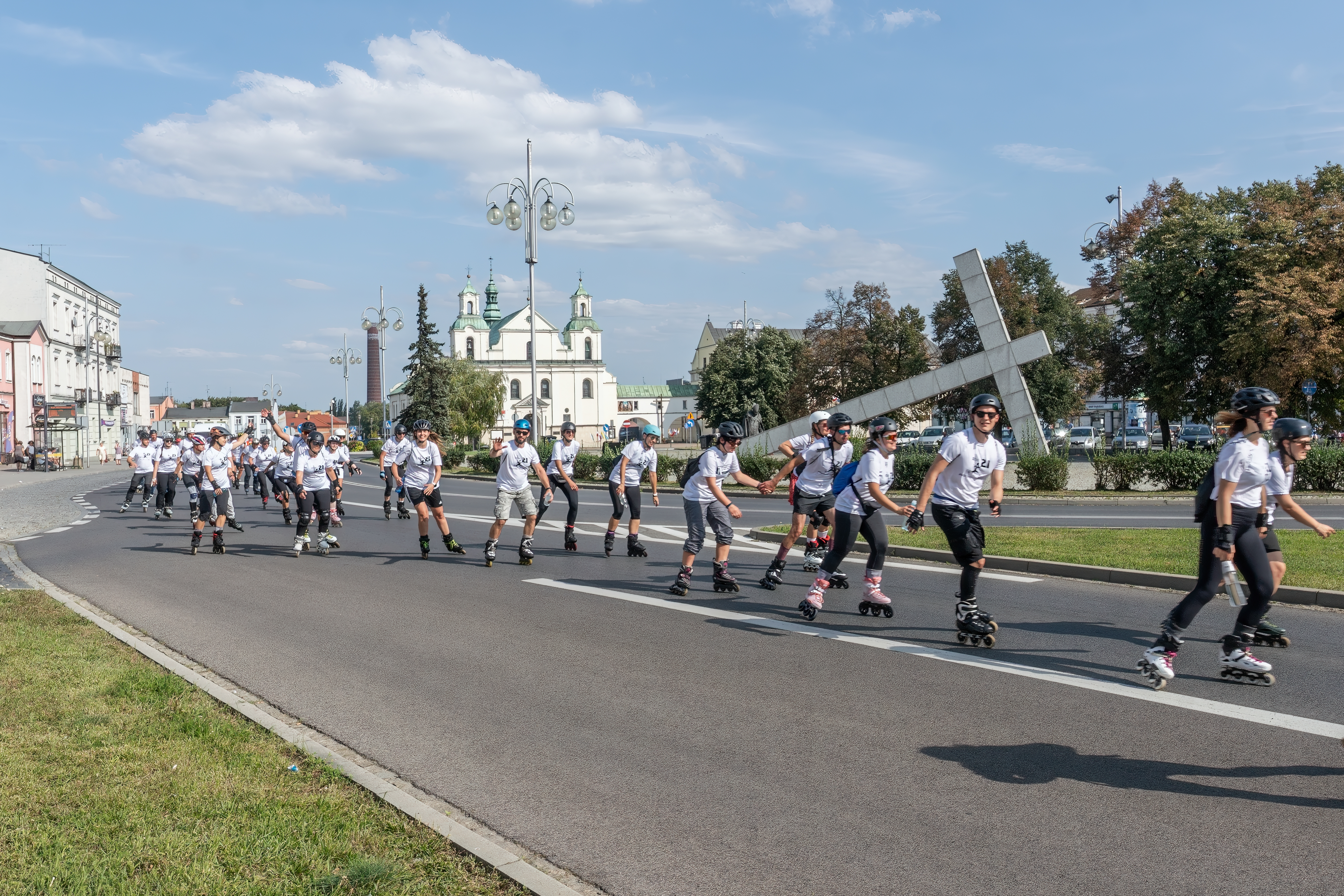
21st inline-skating pilgrimage from Warsaw to Częstochowa in 2024

In addition to walking pilgrimages, there are also numerous bicycle pilgrimages. In 2023, 8,600 people arrived at Jasna Góra in 200 bicycle groups (in 2019: 11,250 people in 170 groups), and 475 people in 17 running pilgrimages (in 2019 there were 413 people in 15 groups). The largest of these is the Ogólnopolska Pielgrzymka Rowerowa ("National Bicycle Pilgrimage"), made up of many groups departing from different locations and heading for Jasna Góra.

== History ==
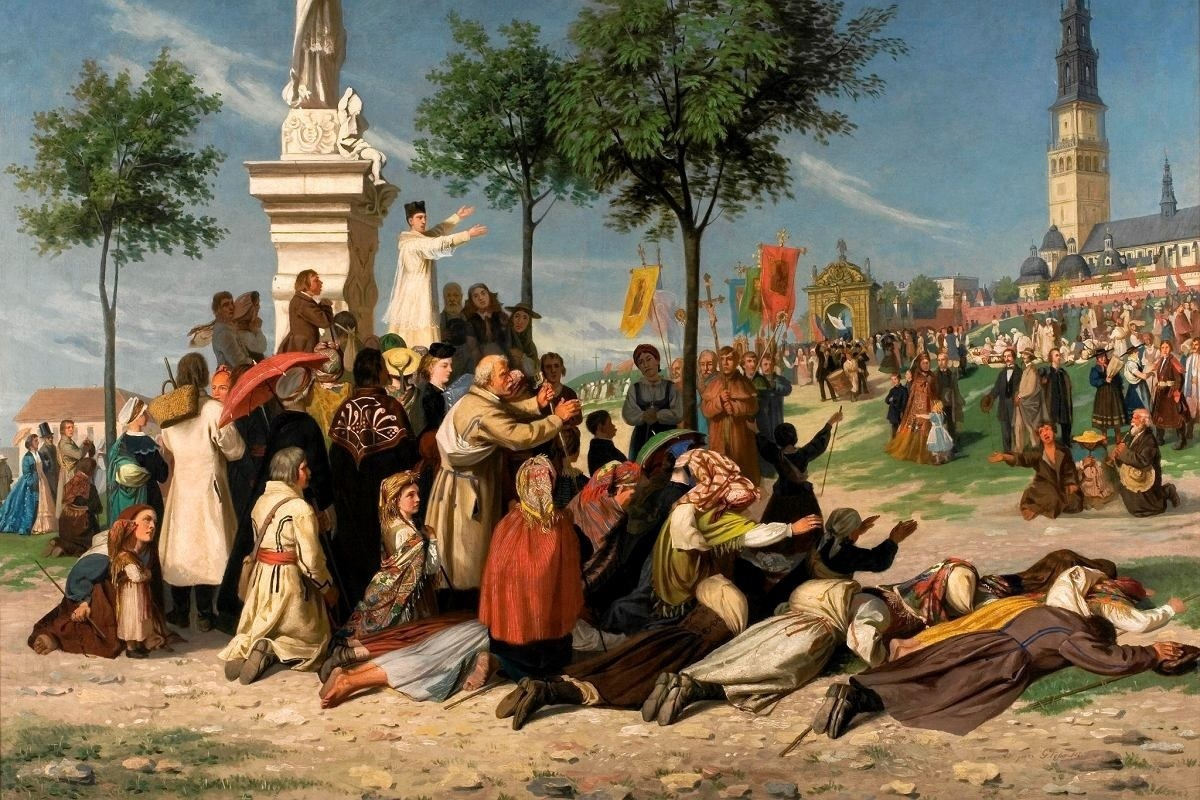
Adrian Głębocki, Arrival of a company at Jasna Góra

Jasna Góra in Częstochowa is a pilgrimage site with a long tradition. According to accounts, as early as 1382 Duke Władysław of Opole brought the Pauline Fathers from Hungary, which initiated the development of the sanctuary. The tradition of walking pilgrimages to Jasna Góra dates back to the 15th century: it began when, after being restored following a theft, the icon of the Black Madonna was carried in a solemn procession from Kraków to the Pauline monastery in Częstochowa. The first recorded pilgrimage to the Jasna Góra monastery set out from Gliwice in September 1626 to thank the Virgin Mary for saving the city from a Danish siege during the Thirty Years' War. The city pledged that the pilgrimage would become an annual event.

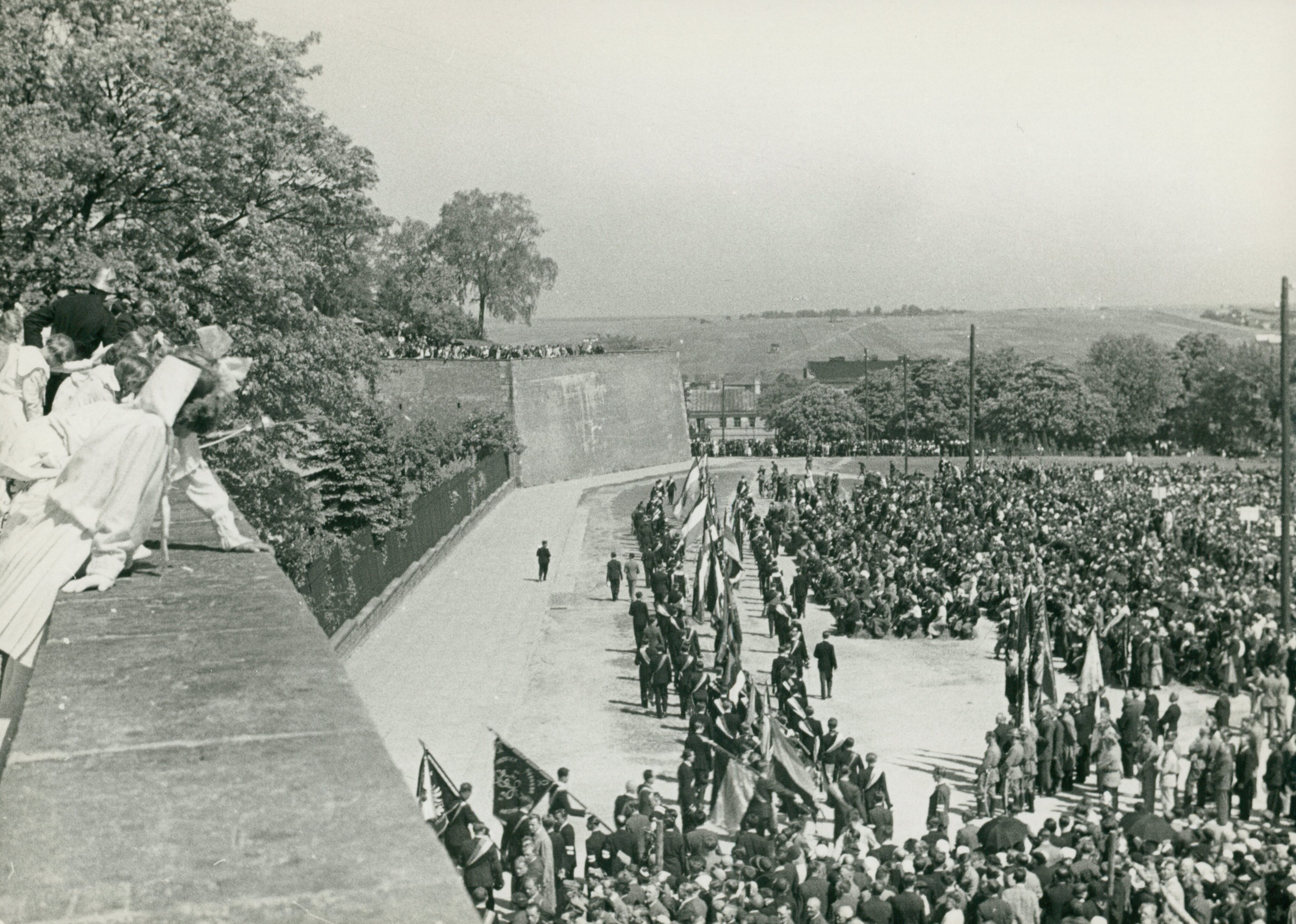
Academic pilgrimage to Jasna Góra, 24 May 1936

The second recorded pilgrimage came from Kalisz (1637), and the third from Łowicz (1656). The pilgrimage from Warsaw set out for the first time on 6 August 1711. Since then the Warsaw Walking Pilgrimage (Warszawska Pielgrzymka Piesza, WPP) has regularly visited Our Lady of Jasna Góra. The WPP has made the pilgrimage uninterruptedly since 1711 – it walked even during the partitions of Poland, the Second World War and the Warsaw Uprising. The COVID-19 pandemic did not break this continuity; during sanitary restrictions an official delegation of 60 people set out on the route. Two centuries later many other pilgrimages were coming here, including from Gliwice, Żywiec, Kraków and Poznań.

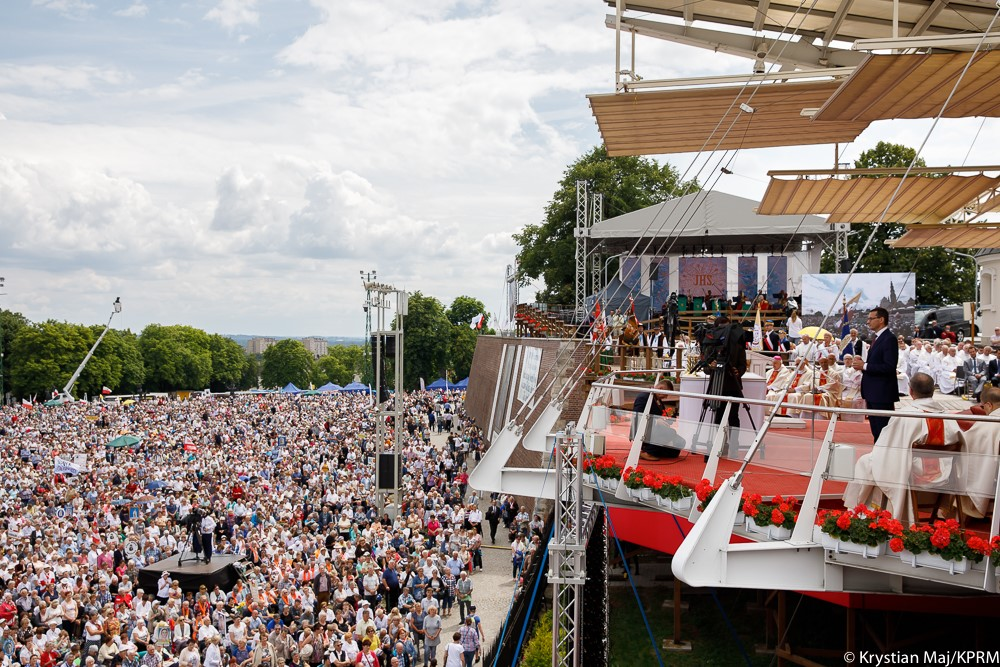
28th pilgrimage of the Family of Radio Maryja in 2019

Since 1979 the colourful Walking Pilgrimage of Youth of Different Ways (Polish: Piesza Pielgrzymka Młodzieży Różnych Dróg) has been organised. Its initiator was Fr Andrzej Szpak. At first he organised a pilgrimage of members of the hippie movement, and later members of other youth subcultures joined in. In the same year the first bicycle pilgrimage also set out – the oldest in Poland: the St Christopher Bicycle Pilgrimage from Rzeszów. In 1990 the first running pilgrimage set out from Bytów. Since 2000 a striking horseback pilgrimage has been organised from Zaręby Kościelne, during which cavalrymen ride in full uniform, with characteristic lances and a banner bearing the image of Mary. In 2003 a nine-person inline-skating pilgrimage reached Jasna Góra for the first time. There was also a horseback pilgrimage with almost 20 participants. As in every year, however, walking pilgrimages were the most numerous: 256 groups – 45 more than in 2002 – with almost 170,000 participants. Since 2015 an inline-skating pilgrimage from Wrocław has also been organised.

== Pilgrimages to Jasna Góra in culture ==
Painting by Ludwik Stasiak: Pielgrzymka na Jasną Górę ("Pilgrimage to Jasna Góra").

Reportage by Władysław Reymont: A Pilgrimage to Jasna Góra

Main theme of the film Pod Twoją obronę directed by Józef Lejtes.
