= Turza Śląska =

- Village
- Location within Poland
- Coordinates: 49°59′N 18°26′E
- Country: Poland
- Voivodeship: Silesian
- County: Wodzisław
- Gmina: Gorzyce
- Population: 3,094

Turza Śląska [ˈtuʐa ˈɕlɔ̃ska] is a village in the administrative district of Gmina Gorzyce, within Wodzisław County, Silesian Voivodeship, in southern Poland, close to the Czech border.
