= Jasna Góra Monastery =

Historic Catholic shrine and pilgrimage site in Częstochowa, Poland

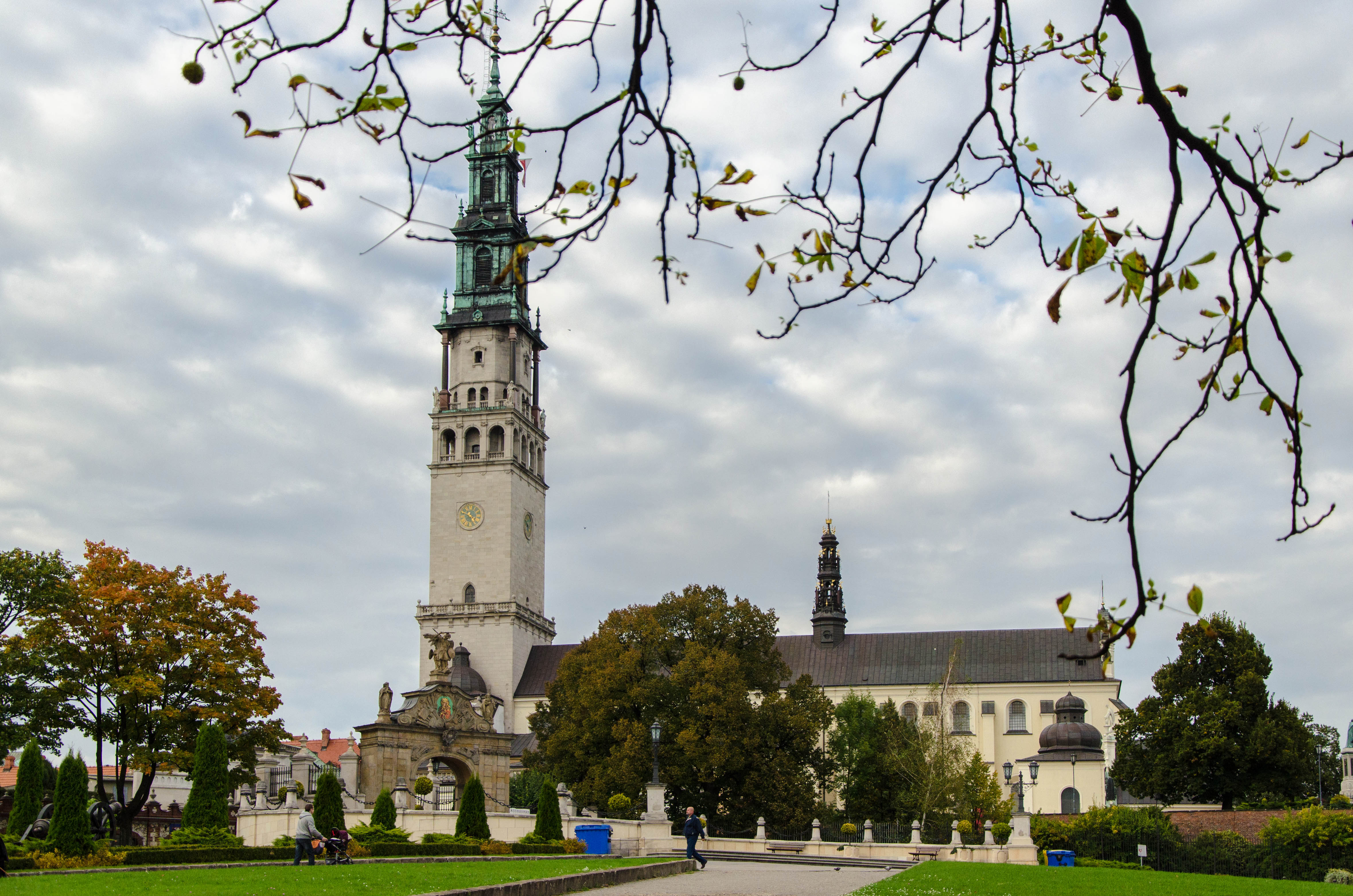

- Location within Poland Location within Silesian Voivodeship

Monastery information
- Order: Pauline Order
- Established: 1382
- Diocese: Częstochowa
- Controlled churches: Basilica of the Assumption

People
- Founder: Vladislaus II of Opole
- Prior: Samuel Pacholski OSPPE

Site
- Location: Częstochowa, Poland
- Coordinates: 50°48′45″N 19°05′50″E
- Public access: yes

Historic Monument of Poland
- Designated: September 8, 1994
- Reference no.: M.P. z 1994 r. Nr 50, poz. 413

The Jasna Góra Monastery (Polish: Jasna Góra [ˈjas.na ˈɡu.ra], Luminous or Light Mountain, Latin: Clarus Mons) in Częstochowa, Poland, is a shrine dedicated to the Virgin Mary and one of the country's places of pilgrimage. The image of the Black Madonna of Częstochowa, also known as Our Lady of Częstochowa, to which miraculous powers are attributed, is one of Jasna Góra's most precious treasures.

The site is one of Poland's official national Historic Monuments (Pomnik historii) and is tracked by the National Heritage Board of Poland.

== History ==
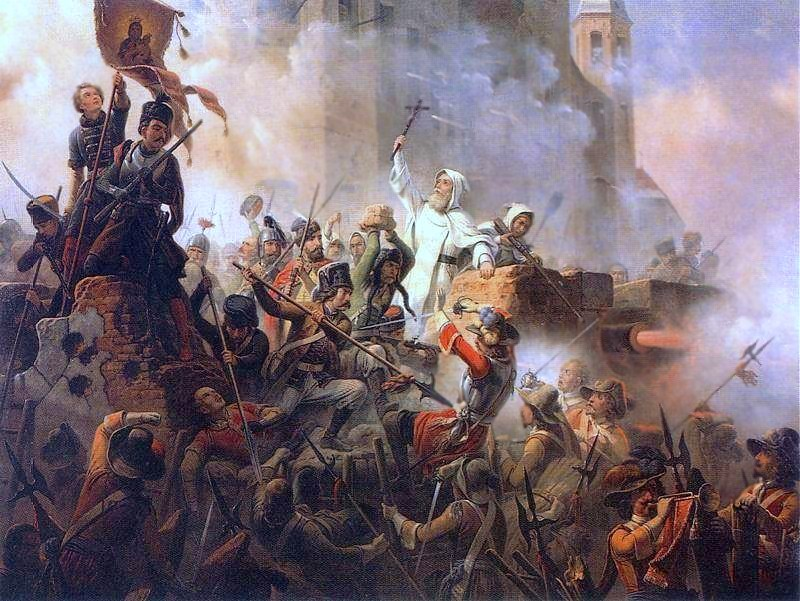
The Defence of Jasna Góra 1655 – by January Suchodolski

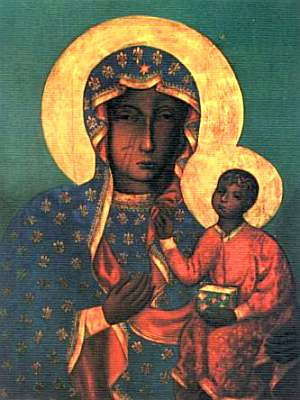
Black Madonna of Częstochowa, Poland

Jasna Góra Monastery was founded in 1382 by Pauline monks who came from Hungary at the invitation of Vladislaus II of Opole. The new monastery was entrusted with the icon, depicting the Mother of God with the Christ Child, known as the Black Madonna of Częstochowa or Our Lady of Częstochowa. On April 14, 1430, Jasna Góra was sacked by the Hussites. It was originally a single-nave church, which was enlarged around 1463 to become a three-nave hall church in the Gothic style.

In the winter of 1655, the monastery was unsuccessfully besieged by the Swedish army during the Second Northern War, or The Deluge (as the Swedish invasion of the Polish–Lithuanian Commonwealth is known). The event stimulated the Polish resistance and shortly thereafter, in the cathedral of Lwów (Lviv), on April 1, 1656, Jan Kazimierz, the King of Poland, solemnly pronounced his vow to consecrate the country to the protection of the Mother of God and proclaimed Her the Patron and Queen of the lands in his kingdom. On March 16, 1657, he visited Jasna Góra and prayed there.

Reconstruction in the Baroque style was carried out between 1690 and 1693. Between 1693 and 1696 the walls of the nave and chancel were raised, thus changing the spatial arrangement of the church from a hall to a basilica.

The monastery was again unsuccessfully besieged by the Swedes in 1702, 1705 and 1709 during the Third Northern War. In 1717 the icon of the Virgin Mary was crowned by the decision of Pope Clement XI. Between 1760 and 1772 in the monastery was imprisoned Jacob Frank, Polish-Jewish religious leader, founder of the Frankist sect, who considered himself a messiah. In 1770-1772 Jasna Góra was besiged by Russians during the Bar Confederation.

In 1909, during the Congress Poland period, thieves broke into the monastery and stole millions in rubles worth of jewels, pearls, and other valuables. The icon itself was not damaged. Crowds of praying and weeping people gathered at the closed monastery when the theft was discovered. Pope Pius X himself offered to replace the crown that was stolen, and the coronation occurred in 1910. The coronation attracted Poles from both the Russian and Austrian partitions. Special trains brought people from Warsaw, and the crowds numbered up to 60,000. A monk named Damazy Macoch confessed to the crime in 1910.

Among the monastery's most important exhibits is the Nobel Prize medal from the 1983 Nobel Peace Prize received by Lech Wałęsa, the former Polish president and trade-union organizer.

== Walking pilgrimages ==
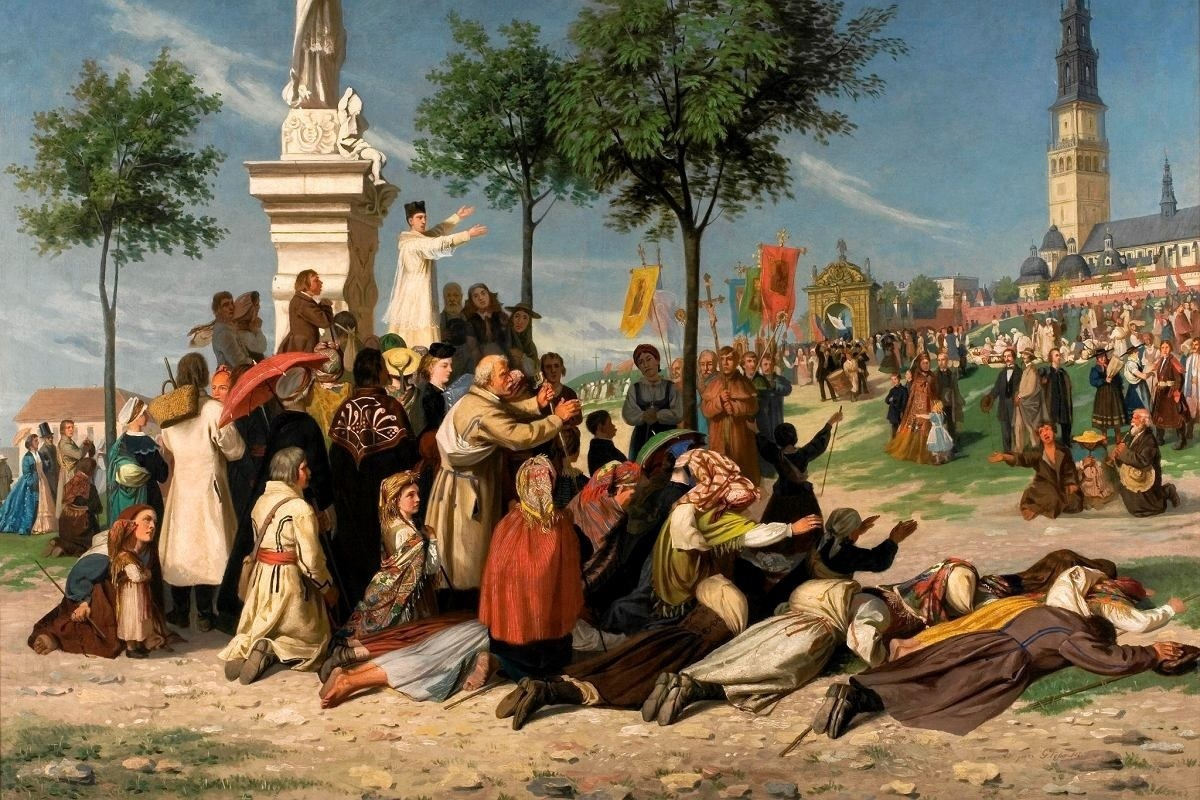
Pilgrims arriving at Jasna Góra, 1868

Every year since the Middle Ages, thousands of Poles go in pilgrim groups to visit Jasna Góra. In 2011, it was estimated that 3.2 million pilgrims from 80 countries around the world went to the shrine. Around 830,000 pilgrims took part in 228 pilgrimages organized in different places across Poland, 143, 983 of which reached the monastery on foot. The average distance for a pilgrim group to travel is about 350 kilometres (217 miles), made in 11 days.

== Monastic etiquette ==
There are typically numerous pilgrims and tourists at Jasna Góra Monastery, and the volume of excited voices can be high. However, upon entering the Monastery, it is expected etiquette for visitors to be silent or as quiet as possible out of respect. Often, there is a long line of people who wait to approach the shrine of the Black Madonna of Częstochowa. Upon arriving at the place of the shrine at which one would pass in front of the icon of Our Lady, it is expected and a sign of respect for pilgrims to drop to their knees, and traverse the anterior of the shrine on their knees.

== Gallery ==
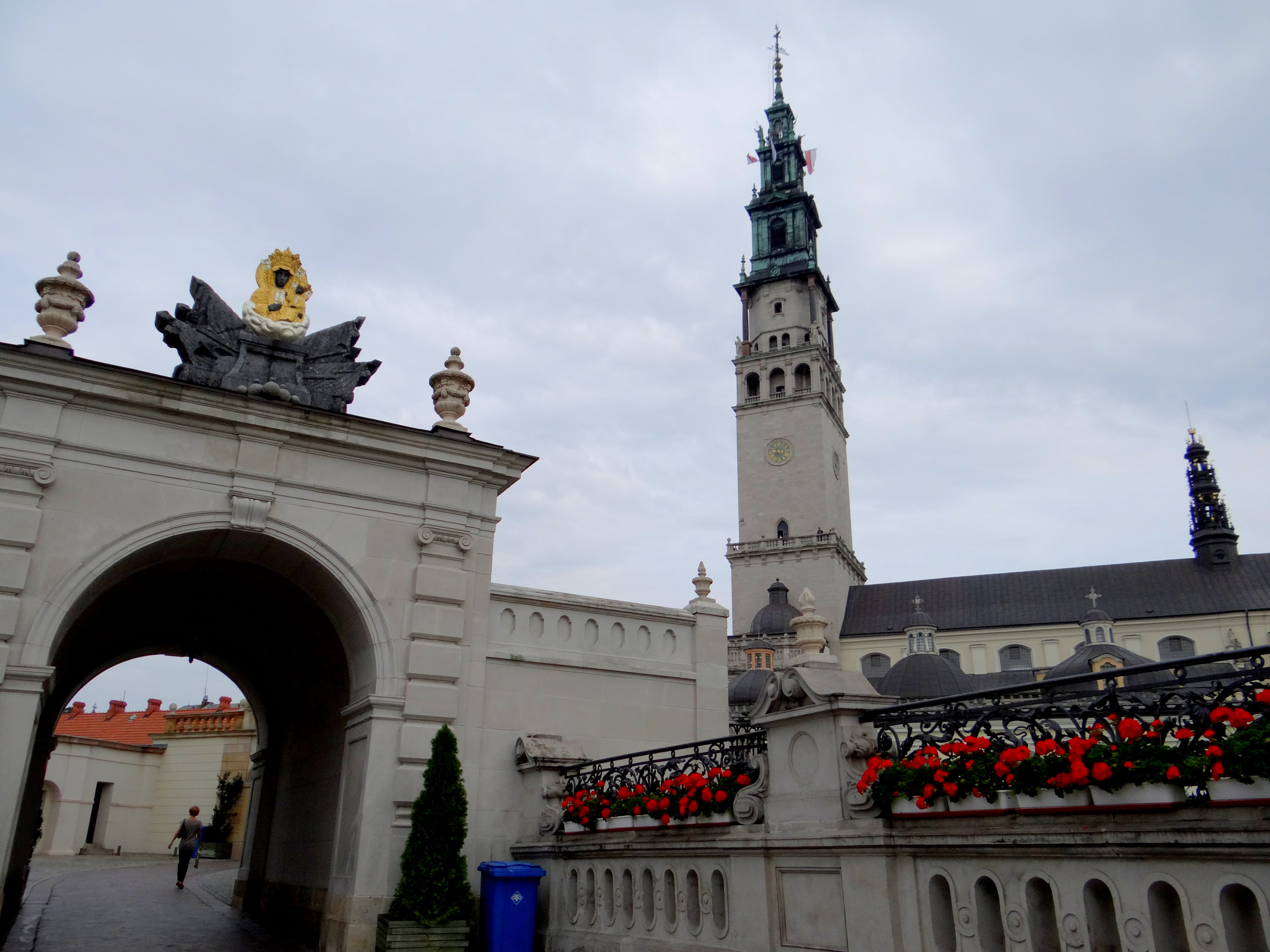
Jasna Góra Monastery

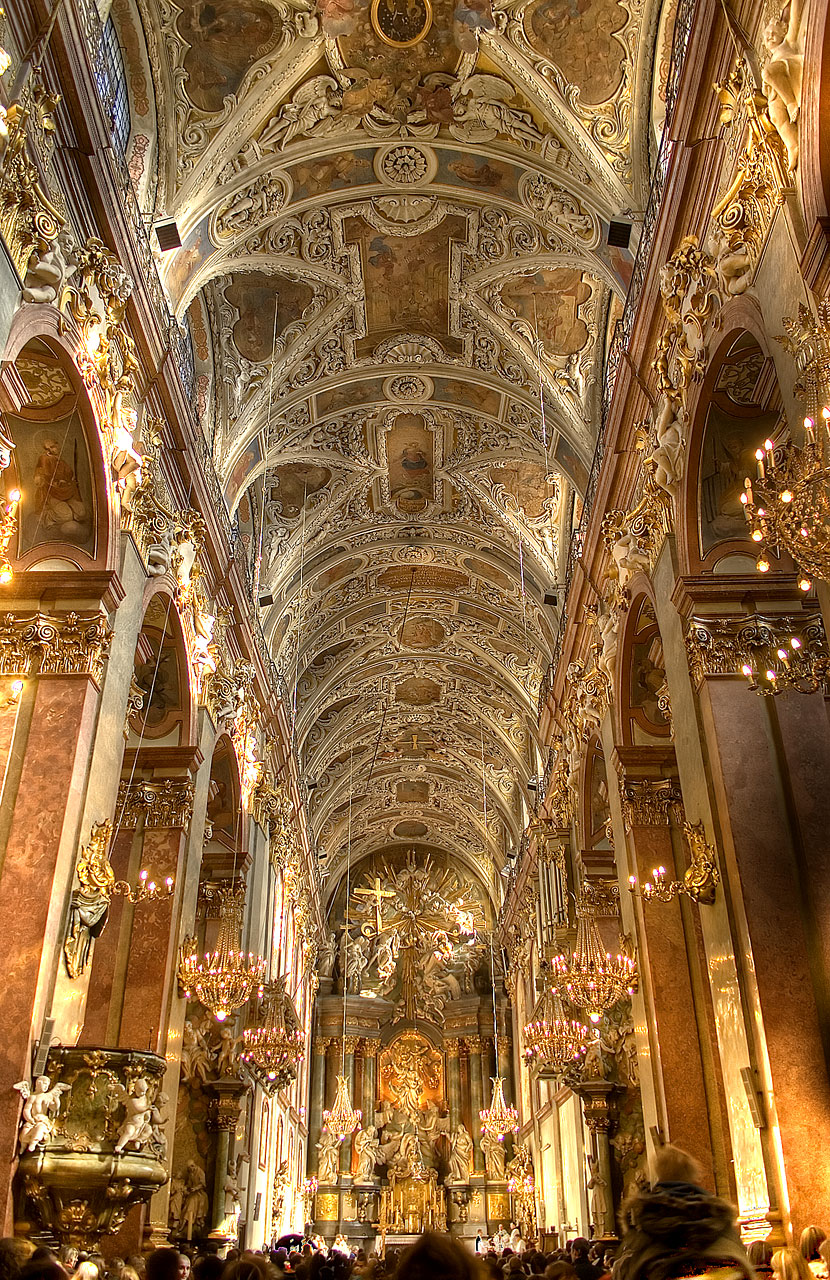
The main nave of the basilica

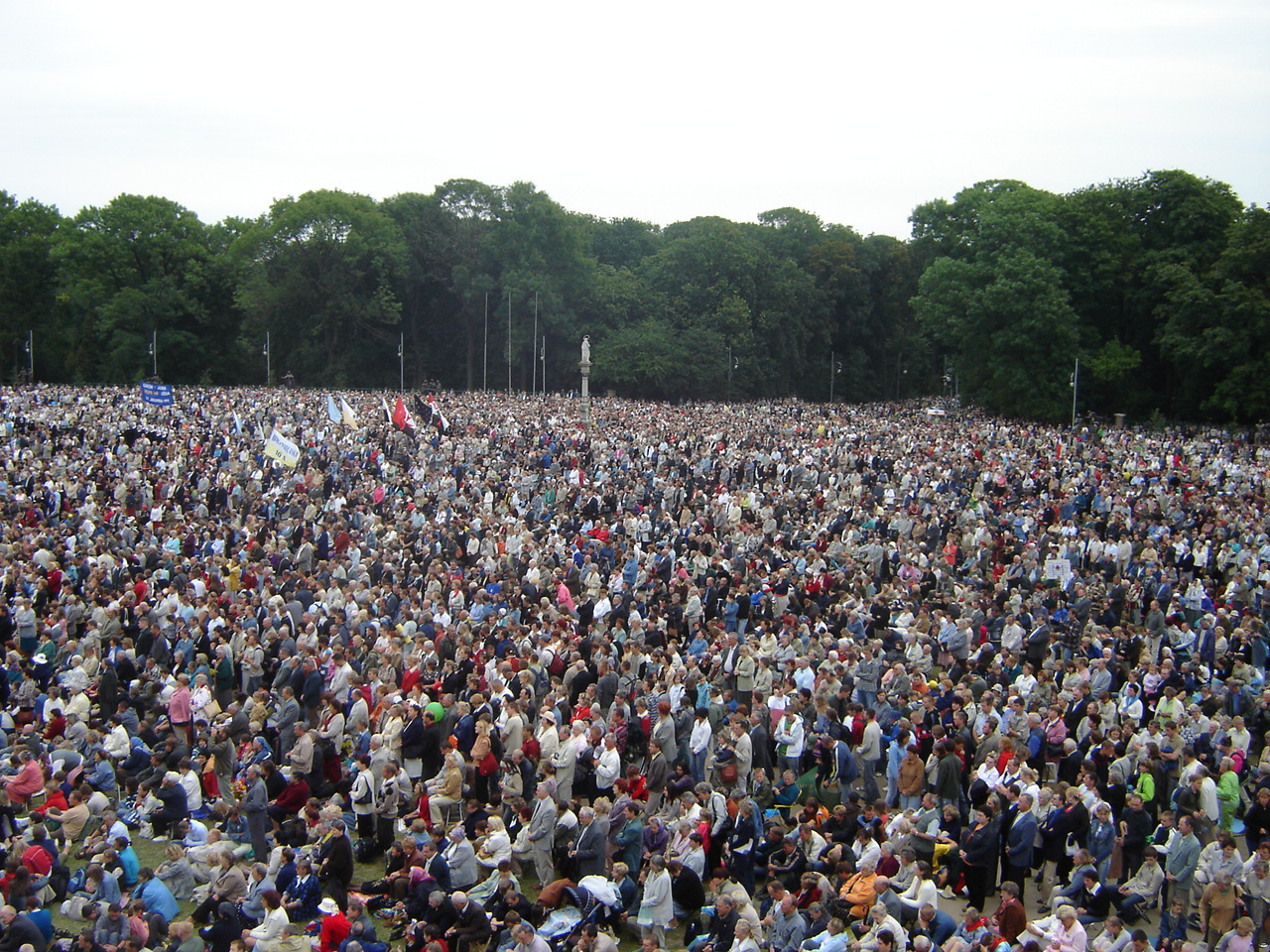
Pilgrims arriving for the Feast of the Assumption

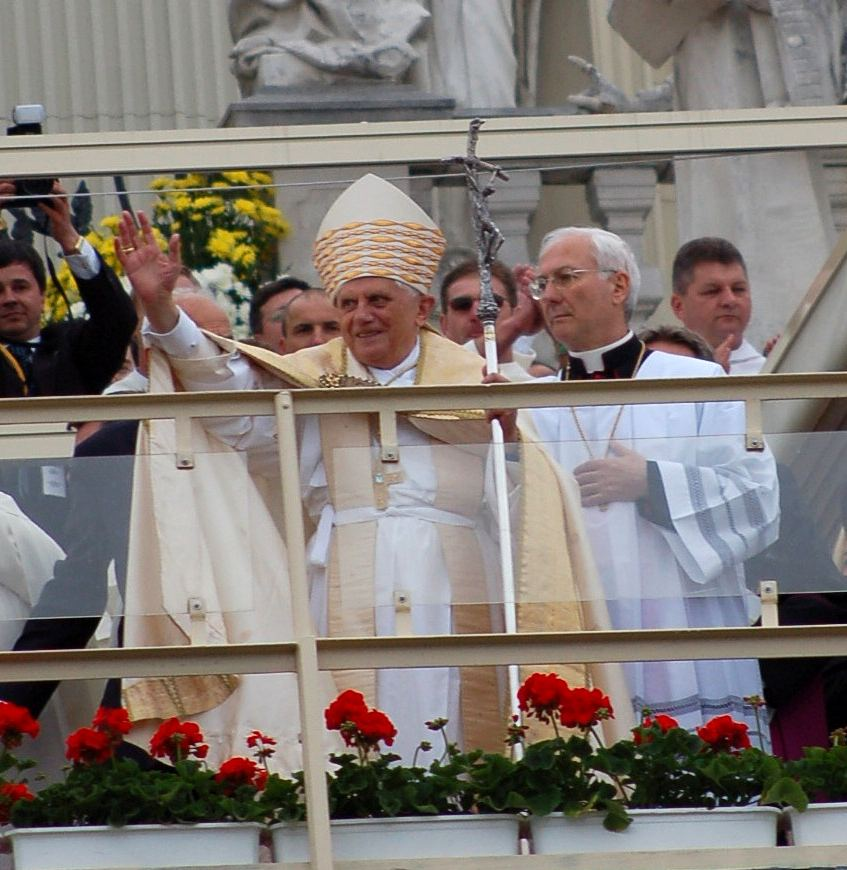
Pope Benedict XVI on Jasna Góra in 2006

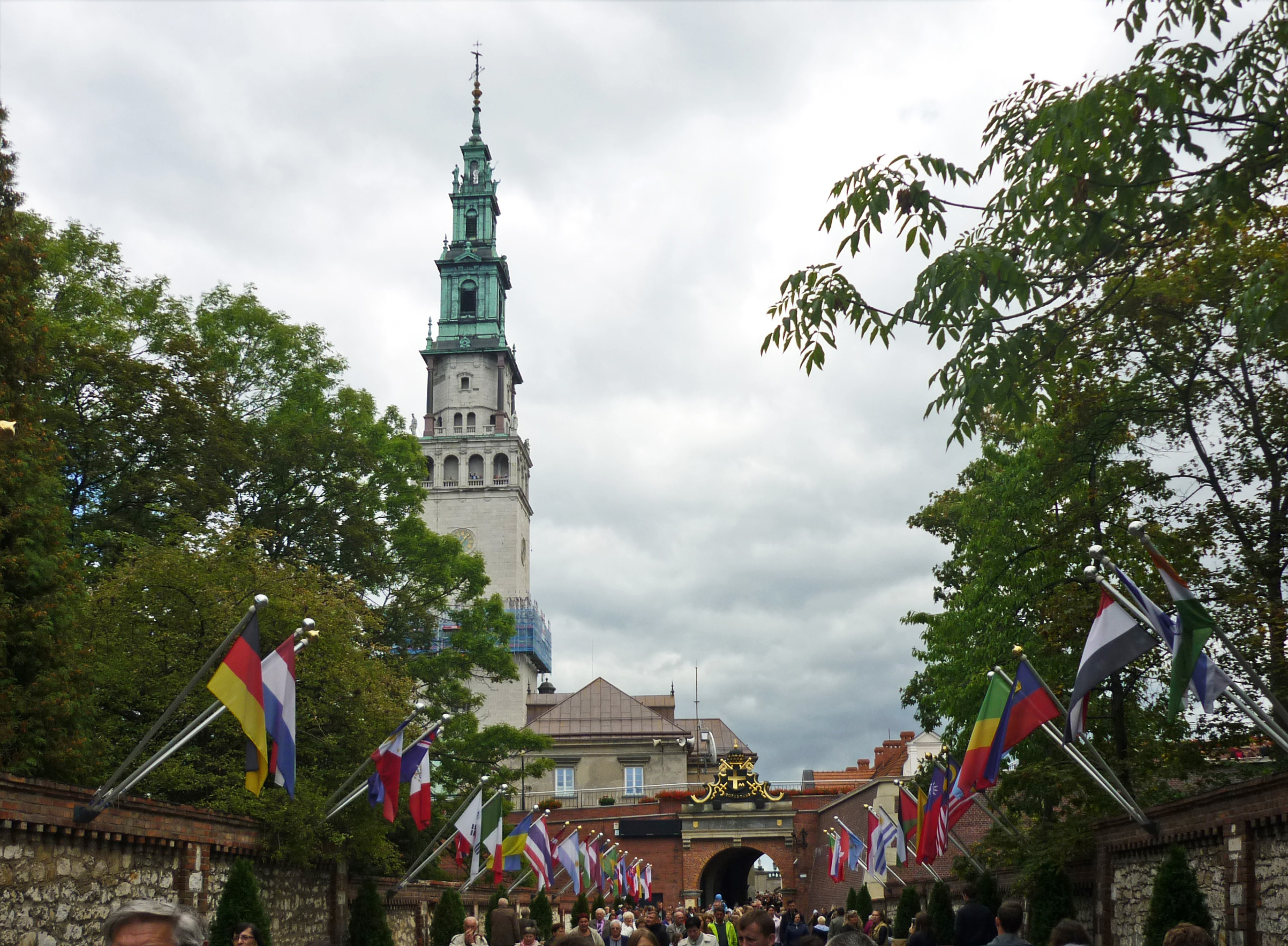
View of the tower

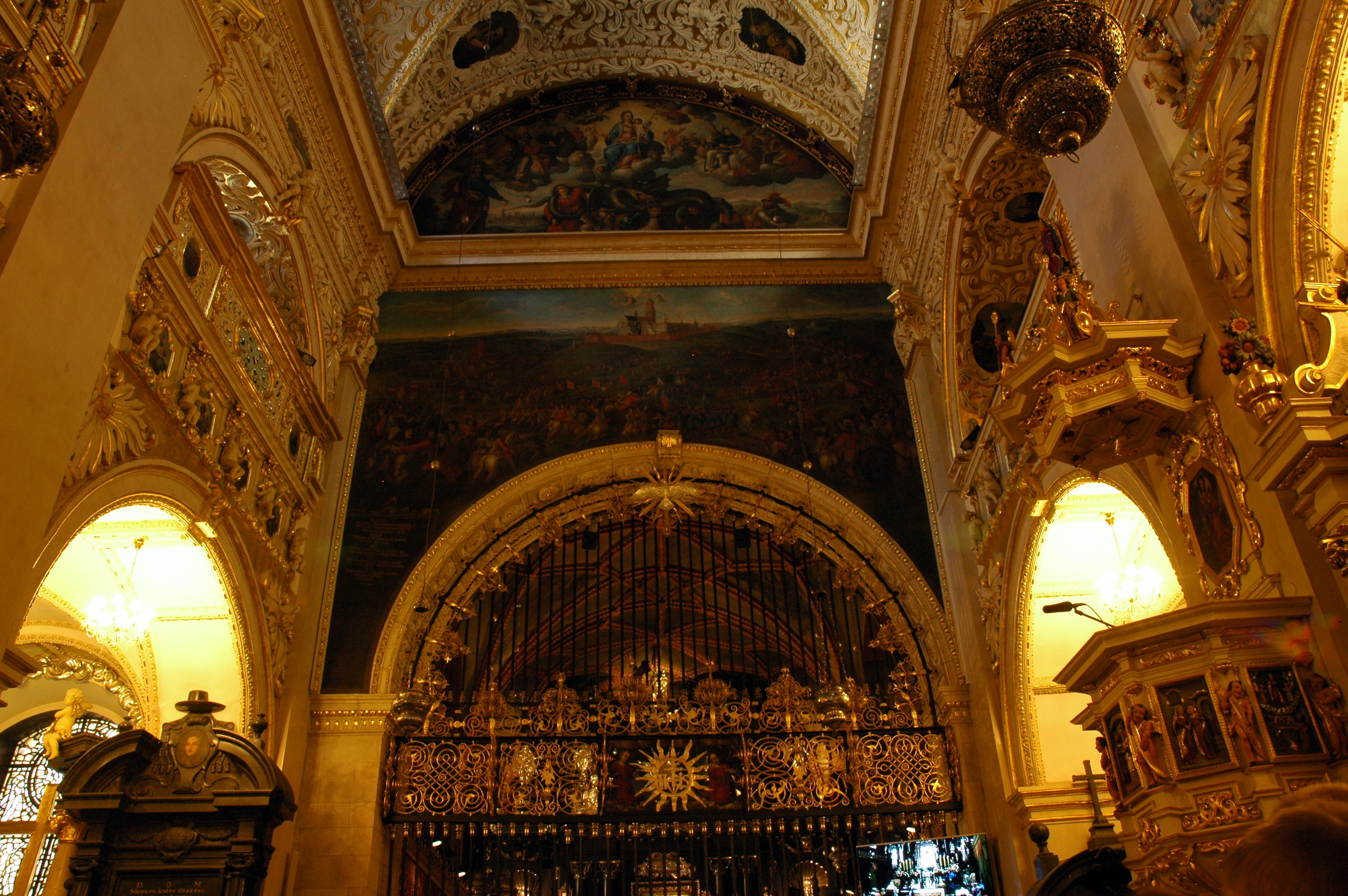
Interior of the monastery

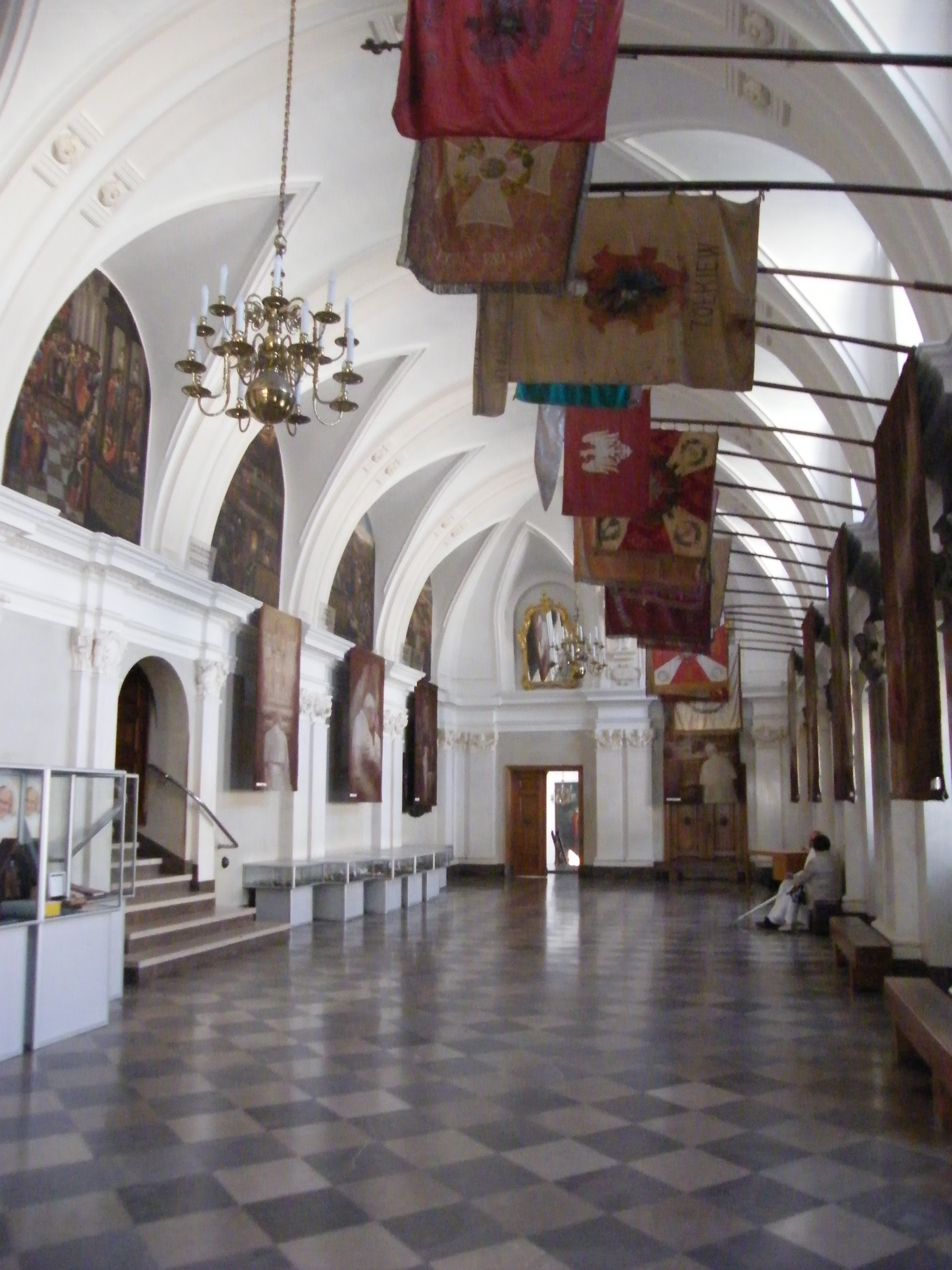
Knights' Chamber

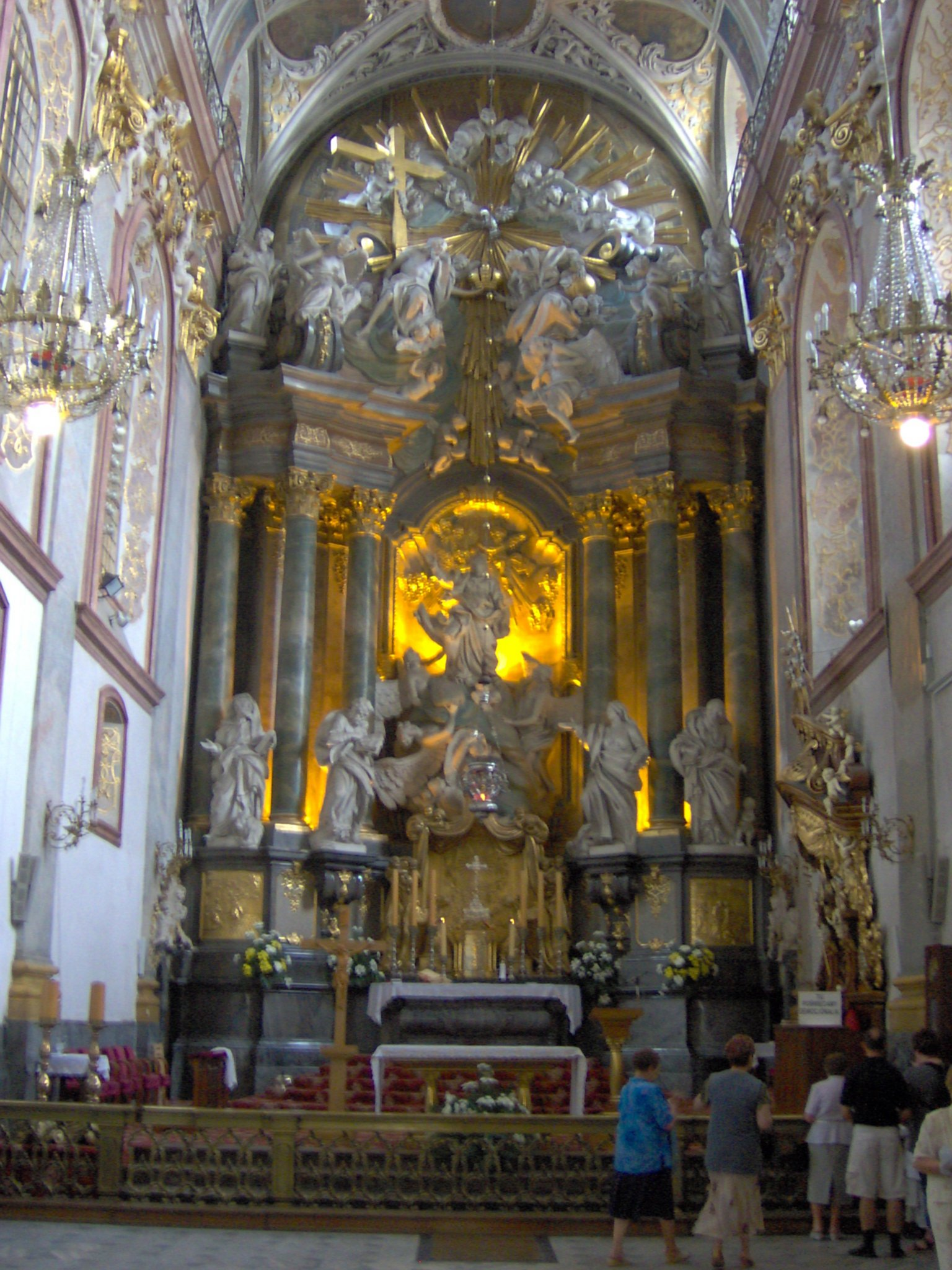
Main Altar

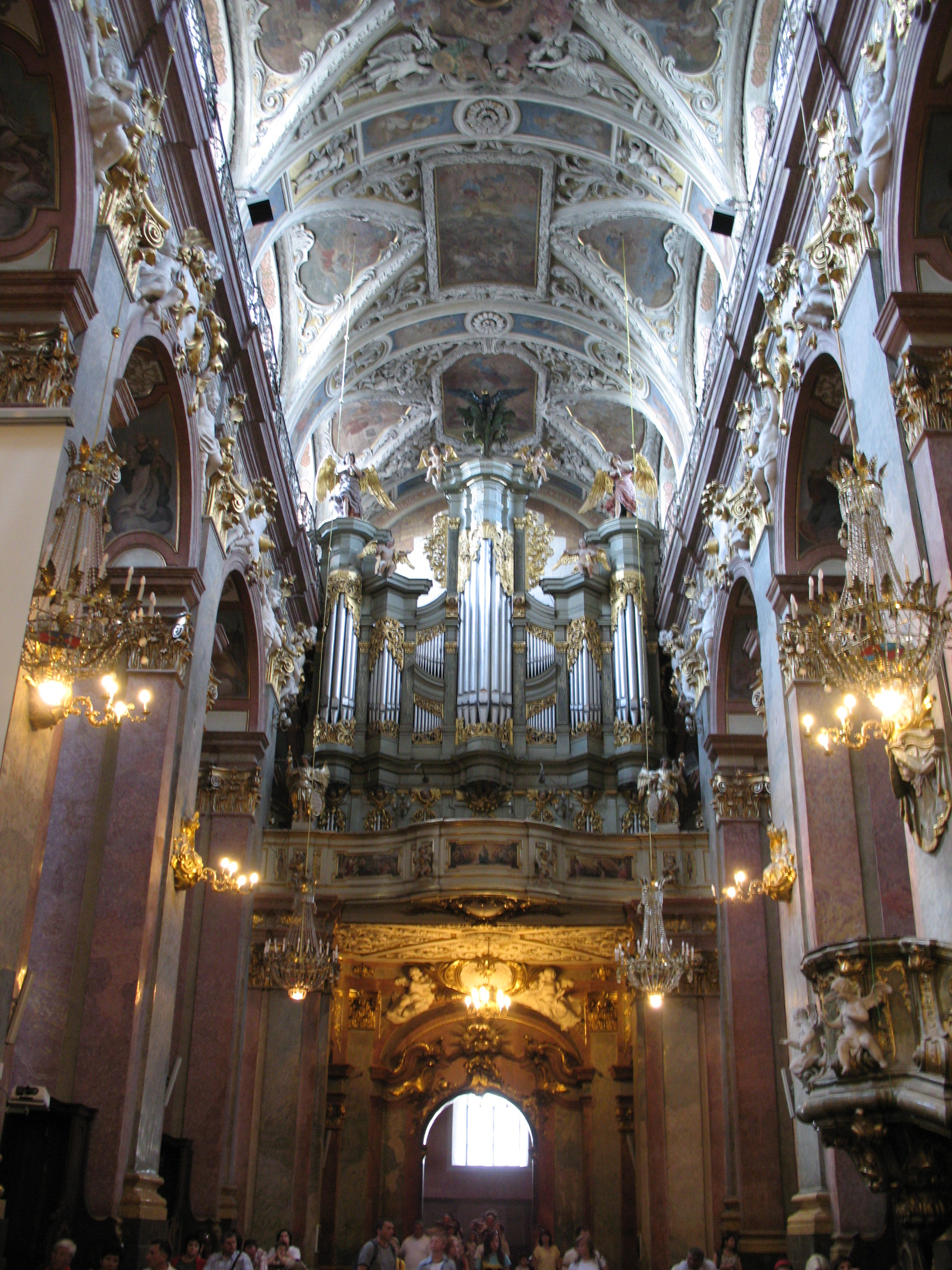
Organs inside the main building

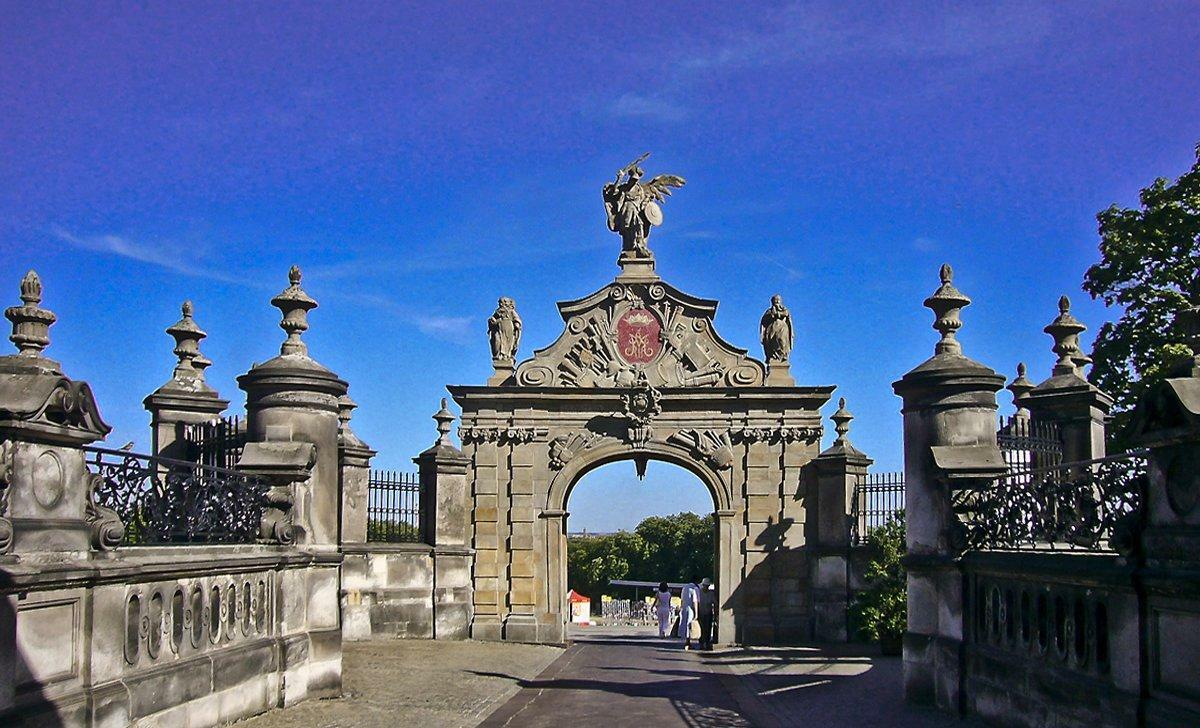
Lubomirski Gate

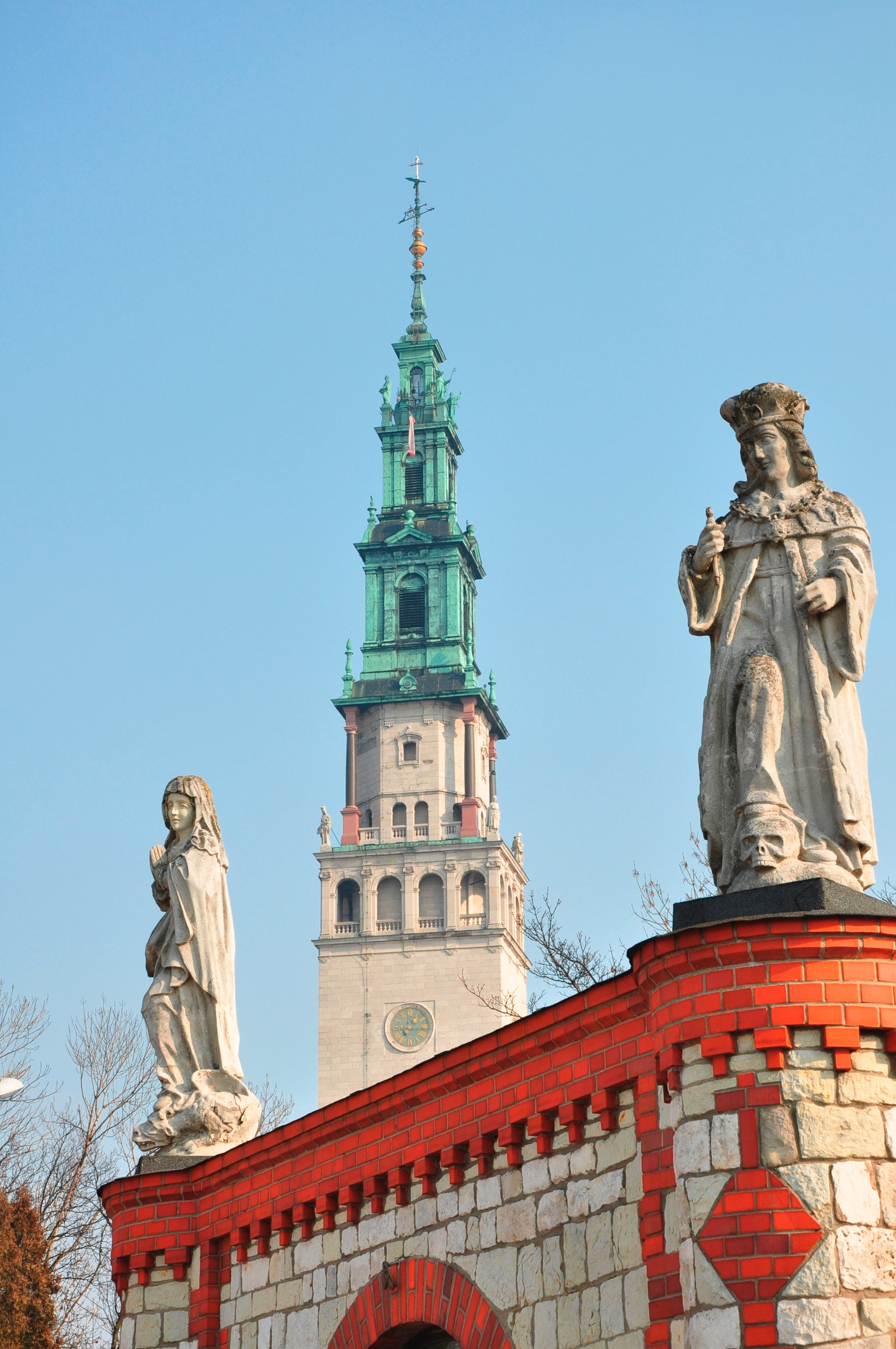
Statues in the monastery

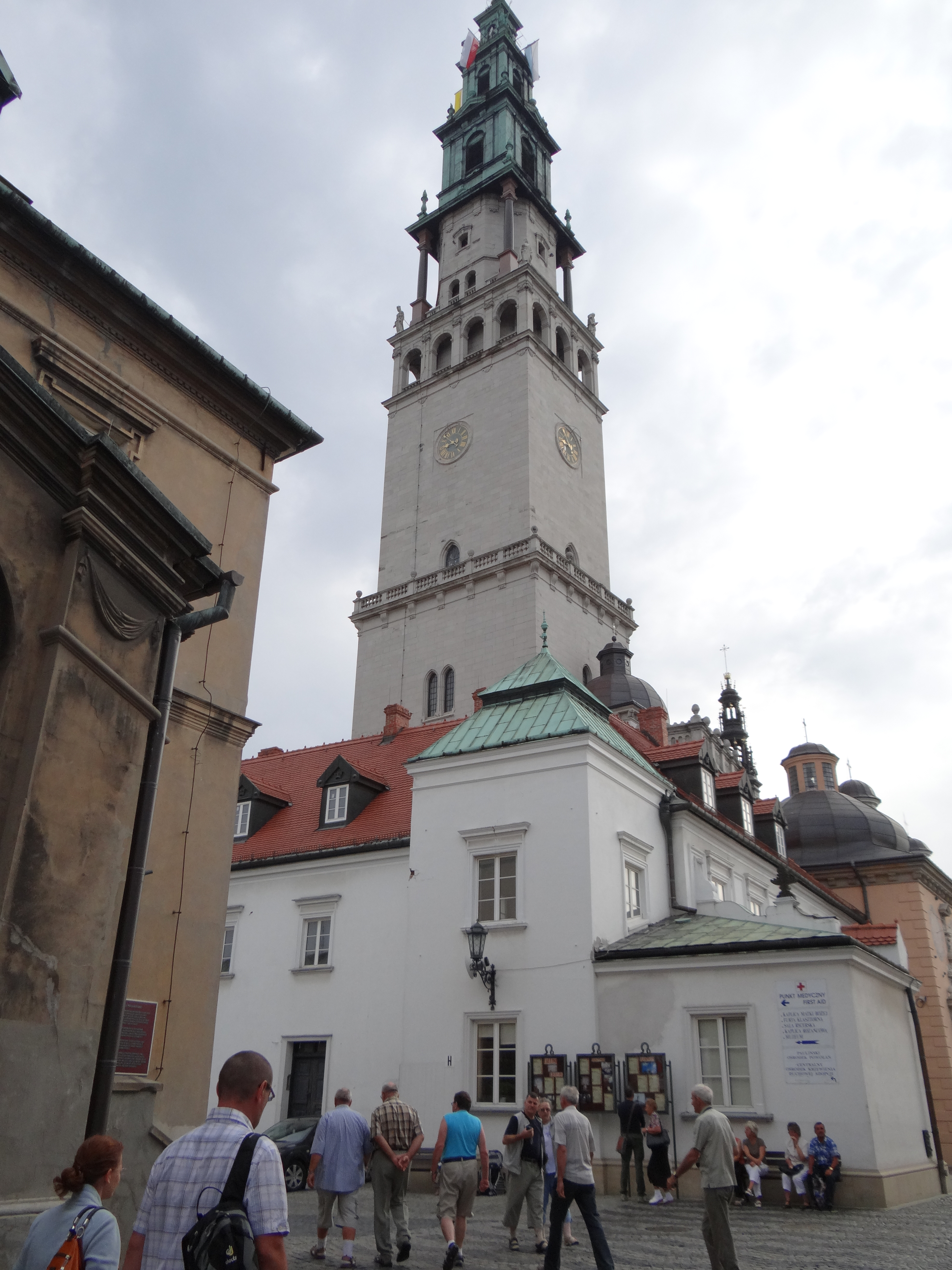
Pilgrims visiting the monastery in 2012

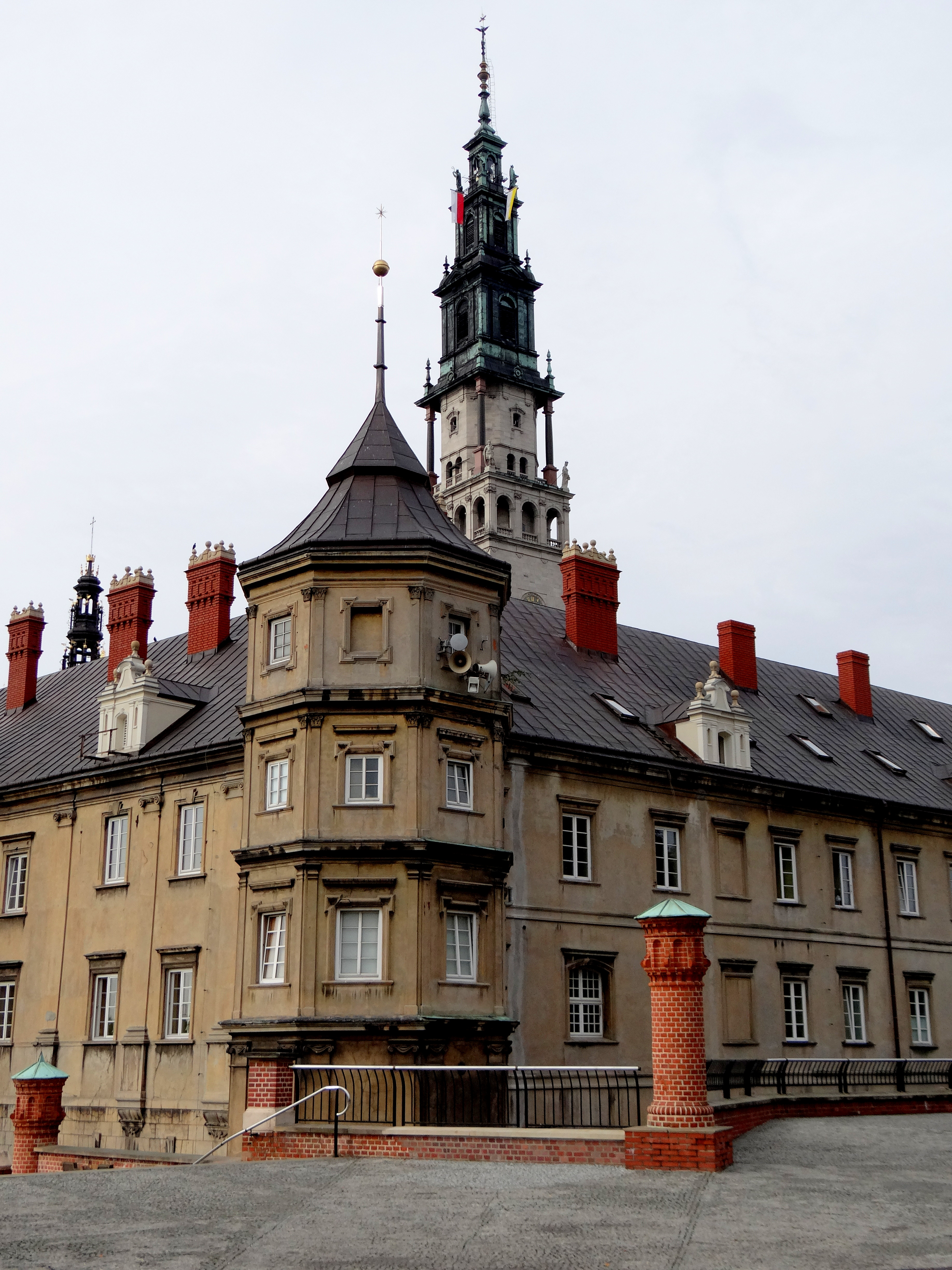
Monastery building

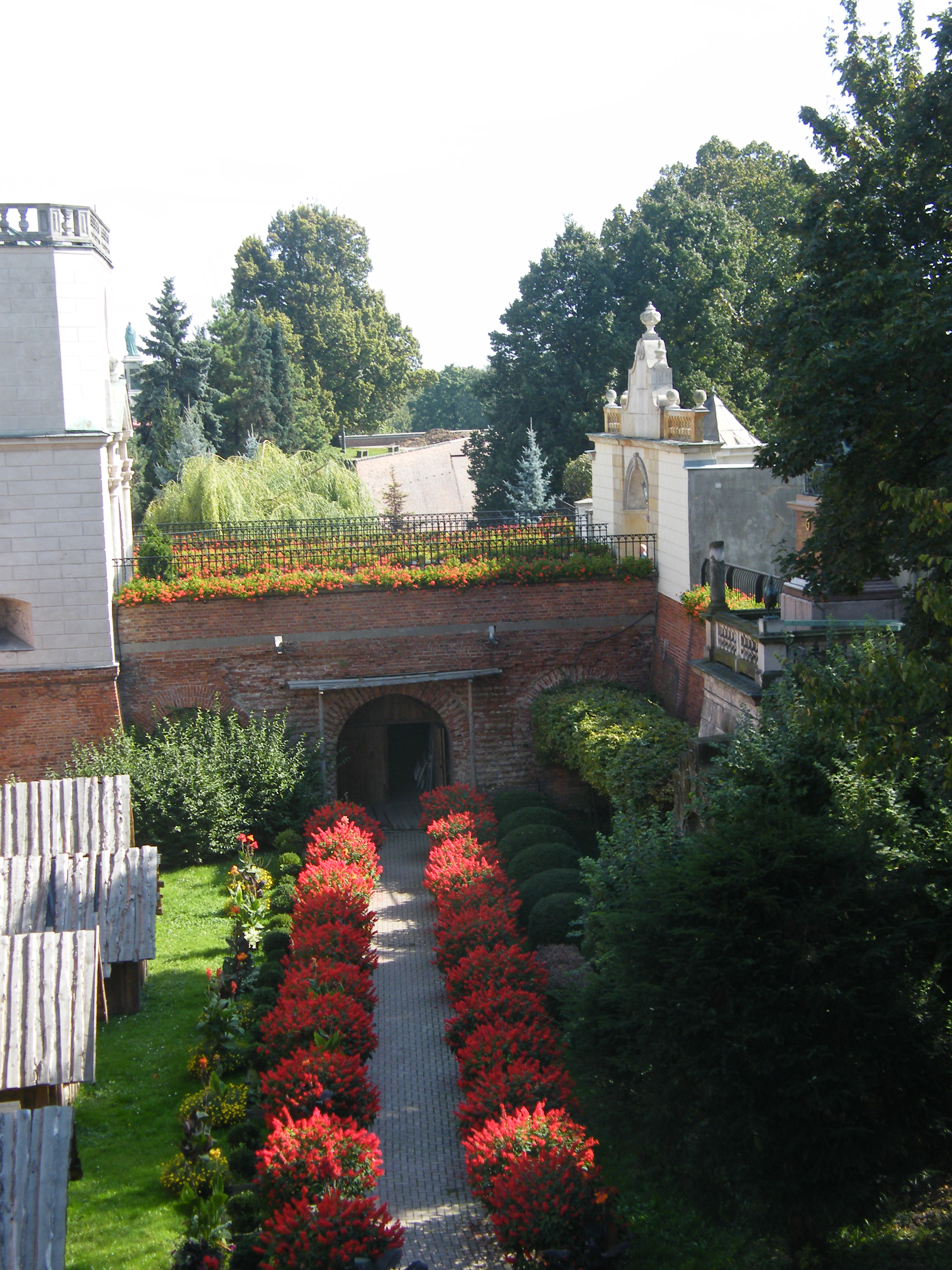
View of the park

== See also ==
- Shrines to the Virgin Mary
- Black Madonna of Częstochowa
- National Shrine of Our Lady of Częstochowa
