= Costa Noroeste de Cádiz =

Coordinates: 36°46′N 6°20′W

- Comarca
- Location of Costa Noroeste de Cádiz in Andalusia, Spain

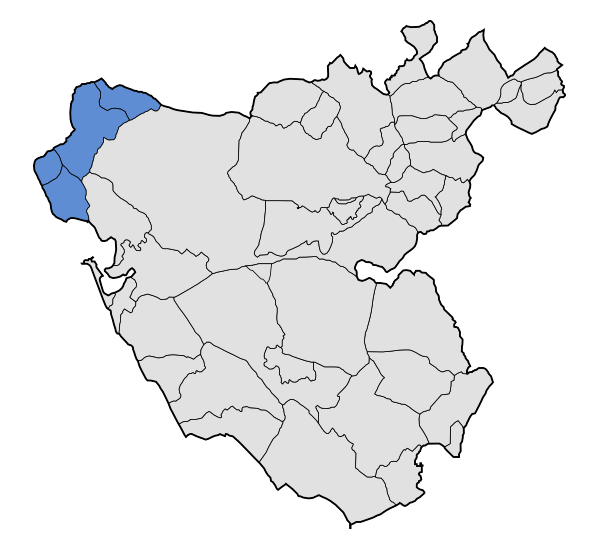
- Location of Costa Noroeste de Cádiz in the province of Cádiz
- Country: Spain
- Autonomous community: Andalusia
- Province: Cádiz
- Municipalities: Sanlúcar de Barrameda, Rota, Chipiona, Trebujena

Area
  - Total: 356.21 km^{2} (137.53 sq mi)

Population (2023) (Note: Estimate at 1 January 2023: National Statistics Institute (Spain))
  - Total: 126,129
  - Density: 354.09/km^{2} (917.08/sq mi)
- Time zone: UTC+1 (CET)
  - Summer (DST): UTC+2 (CEST)

The Costa Noroeste de Cádiz comarca is one of the six comarcas in the province of Cádiz, Andalusia, southern Spain.

The present-day comarca was established in 2003 by the Government of Andalusia.

== Municipalities ==
The Costa de Noroeste de Cádiz consists of four municipalities: Sanlúcar de Barrameda, Rota, Chipiona and Trebujena.

Arms	Municipality	Area (km^{2})	Population (2023) (Note: Estimate at 1 January 2023: National Statistics Institute (Spain))	Density (/km^{2})
	Chipiona	32.92	19,649	596.87
	Rota	84.01	29,675	353.23
	Sanlúcar de Barrameda	170.28	69,805	409.94
	Trebujena	69	7,000	101.45
	Total	356.21	126,129	354.09

== Gallery ==
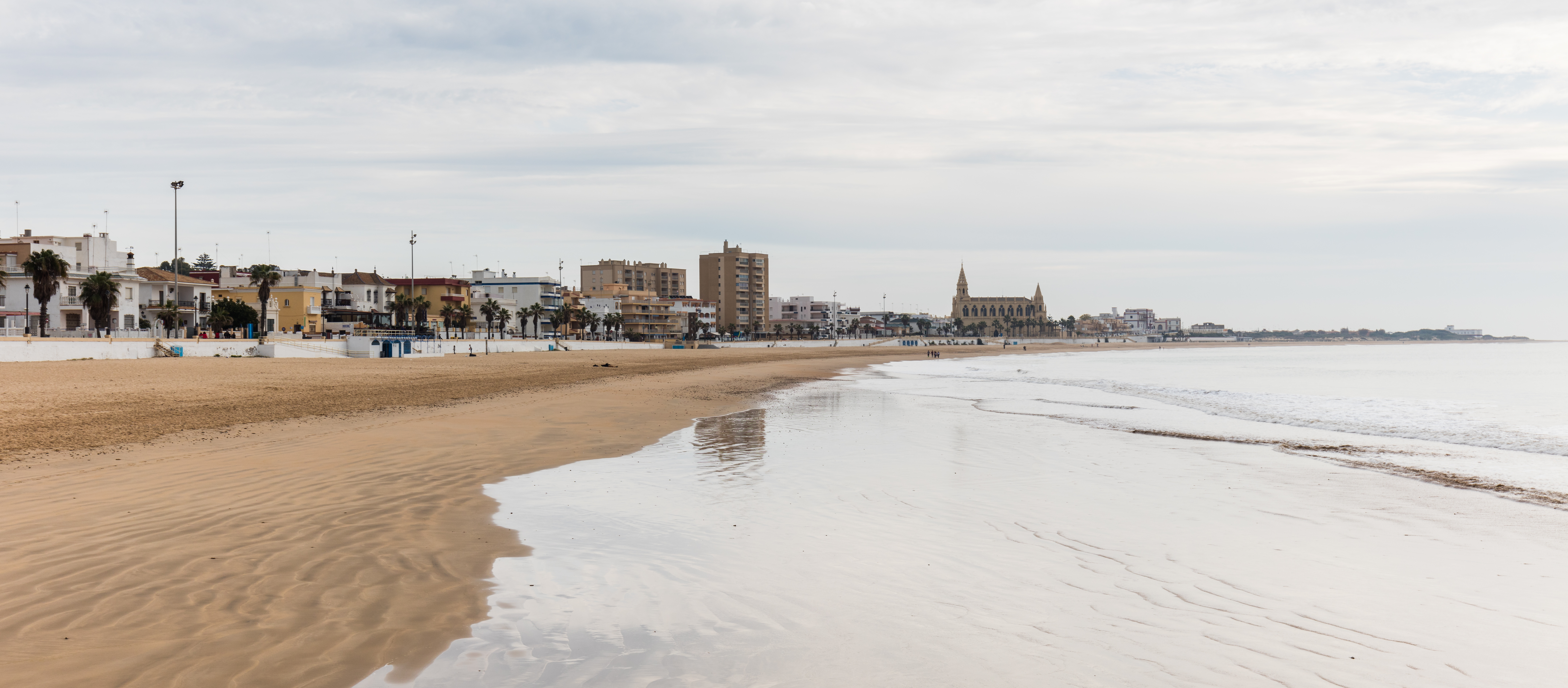
Chipiona

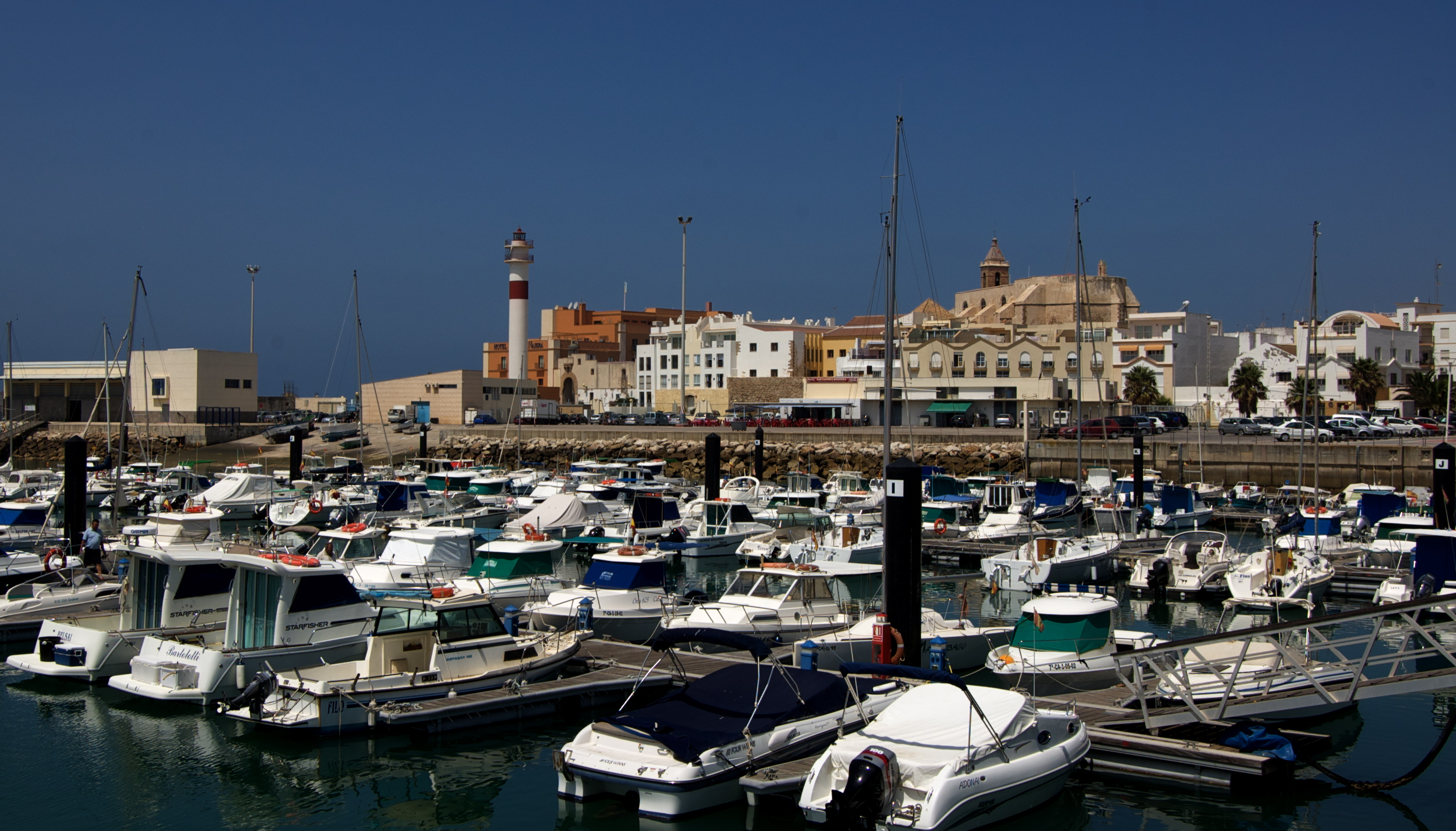
Rota, Andalusia port

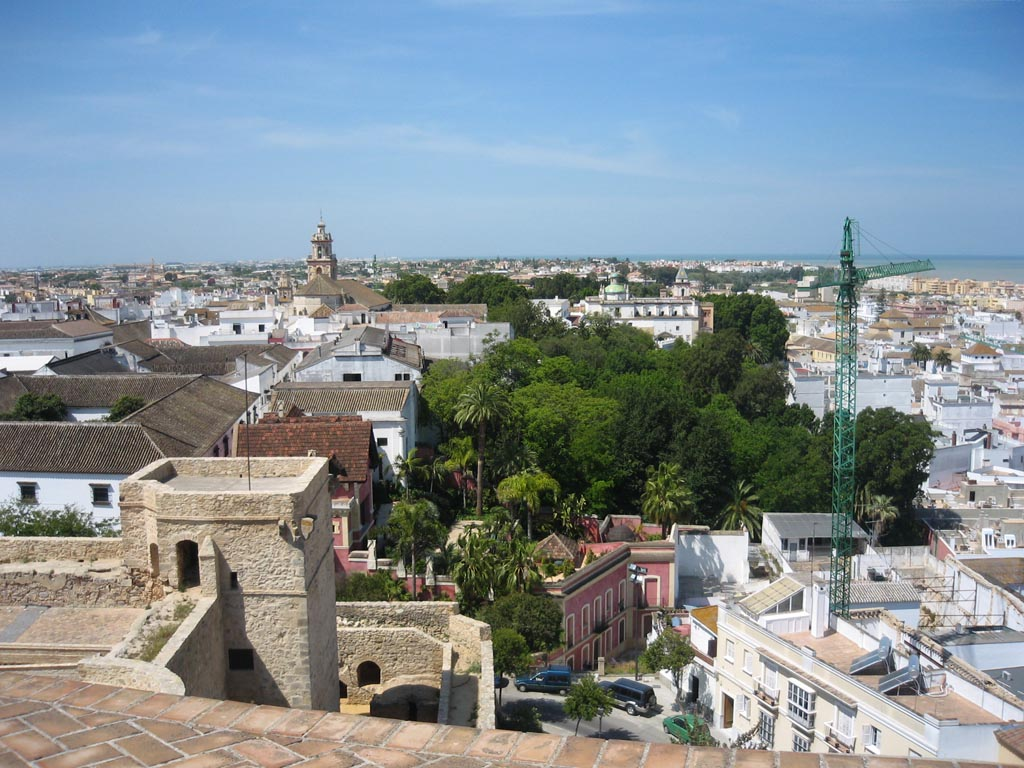
Sanlúcar de Barrameda skyline

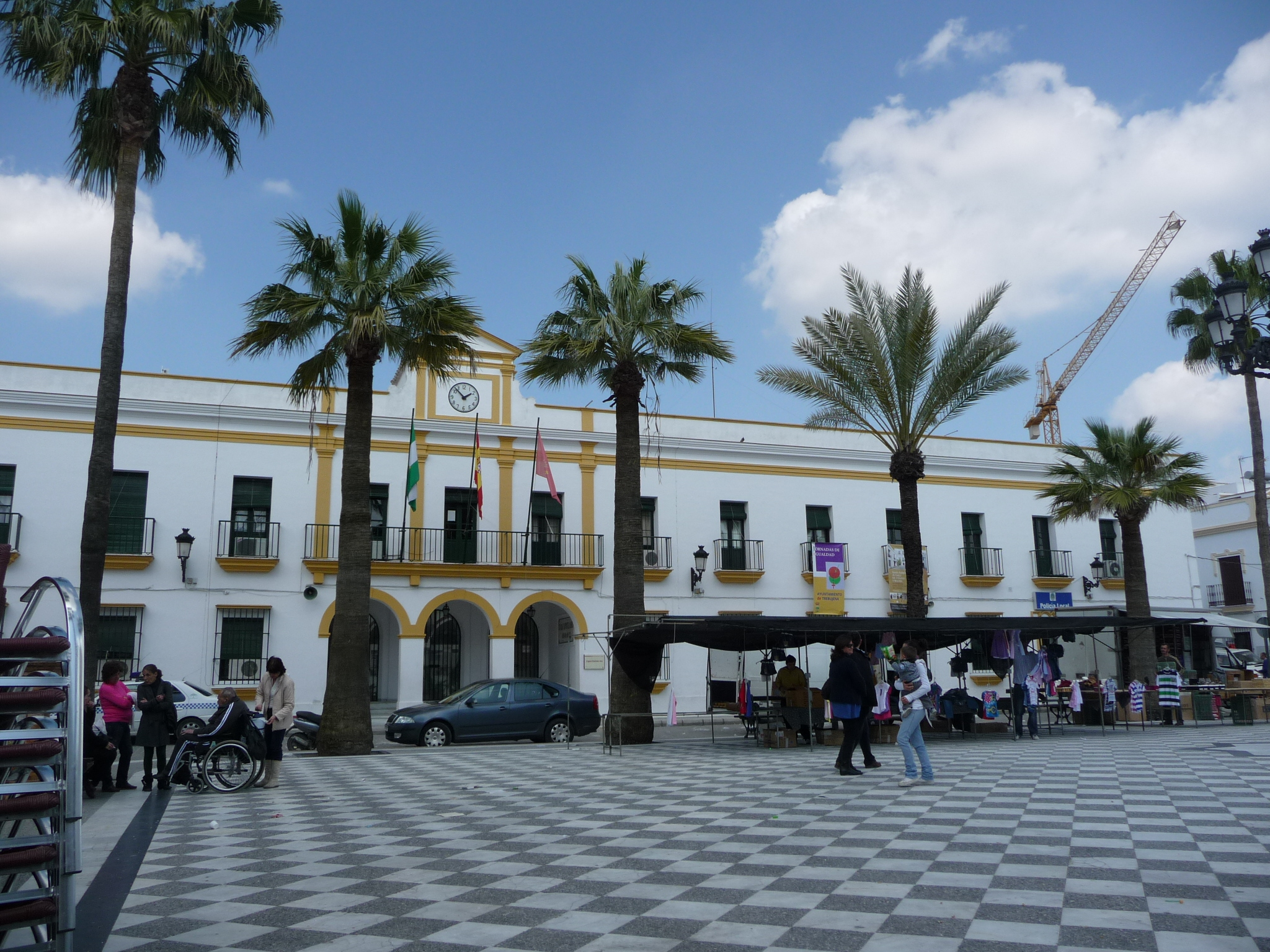
Trebujena Town hall
