= Our Lady of Regla =

Marian apparition

Our Lady of Regla Nuestra Señora de Regla
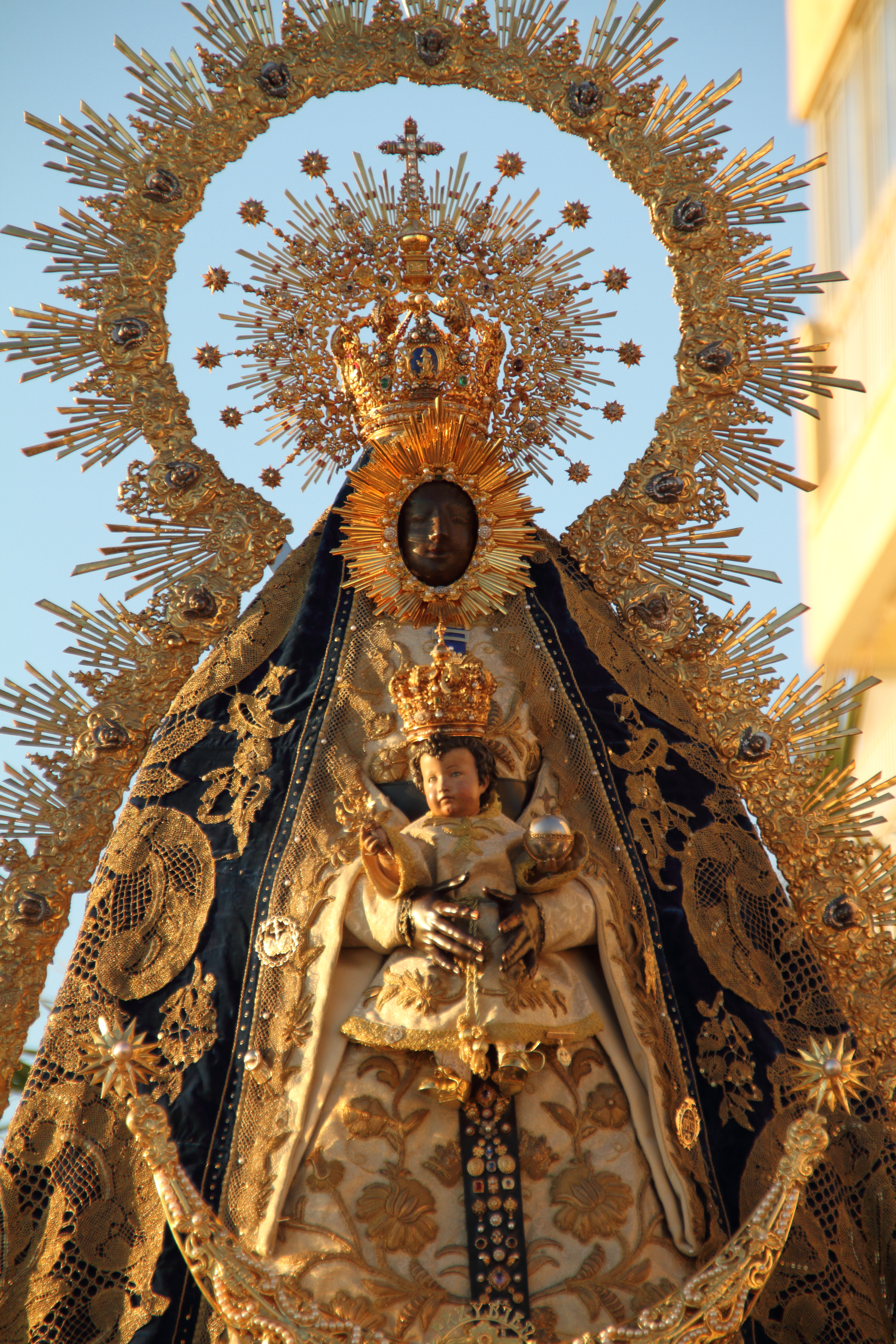
- Original statue of Our Lady of Regla in Chipiona
- Location: Chipiona, Province of Cádiz, Andalusia, Spain
- Date: 13th-century
- Type: Marian apparition
- Approval: Pope Pius XII — Canonical coronation (1954)
- Patronage: Chipiona, Spain; Regla (Havana), Cuba
- Attributes: Patron of sailors
- Feast day: September 8

Our Lady of Regla, otherwise known as Our Lady of the Rule and The Virgin of Regla, is a Marian apparition of the Catholic Church venerated in various Hispanic countries such as: Cuba, the Dominican Republic, and Spain. In contrast to other Marian apparitions, she is typically depicted with dark skin.

== History ==
According to Catholic legend, St. Augustine of Hippo, who lived in North Africa, had a revelation from an angel, who ordered him to carve an image of the Virgin Mary. The image was taken to Spain by his disciple Saint Cyprian, who ended up in Chipiona, where the Virgin of Regla is venerated. The image was hidden underground next to a fig tree following an invasion of Andalusia by the Saracens, and five centuries later in the 13th century, an apparition pointed in the direction of where the image was hidden. Her feast day, September 8, coincides with the Nativity of Mary, and after events of weathering and a fierce storm on the bordering Strait of Gibraltar, she became a patroness of seamen.

== Veneration ==
=== Spain ===
In Spain, an image of the Virgin of Regla is located in the town of Chipiona, Andalusia. It is a wooden sculpture about 0.62 meters high in the Romanesque style, a typical trait of the Black Madonna.

In other parts of Andalusia, the devotion to Our Lady of Regla is present, such as a church dedicated to her in the city of Huécija and in a brotherhood in the city of Seville as a patron of bakers. In the Canary Islands, there are various hermitages dedicated to her.

=== Cuba ===
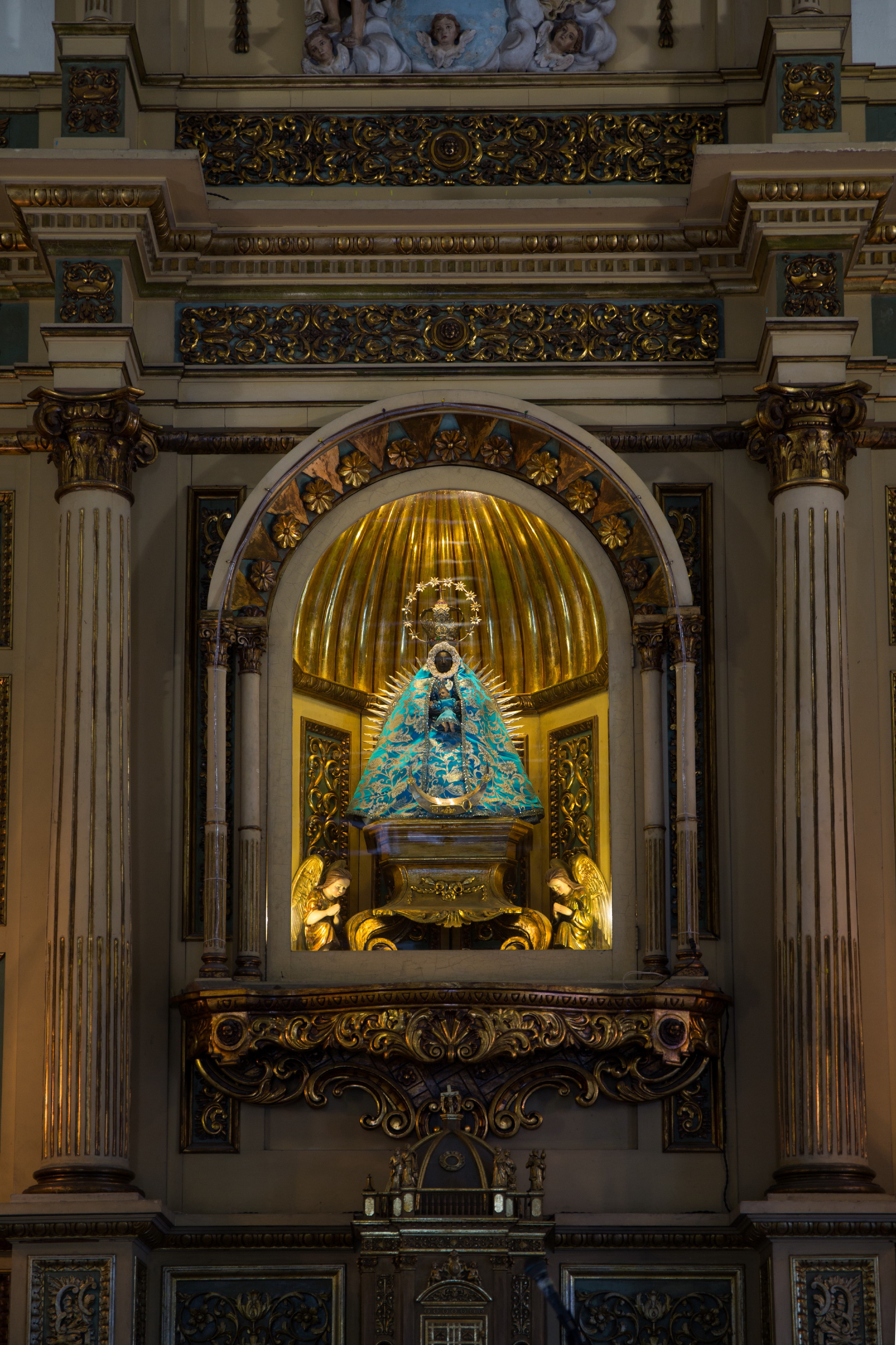
Statue of Our Lady of Regla in Havana

In Cuba, in the Regla municipality of Havana, a hermitage was built in 1687 by a pilgrim named Manuel Antonio dedicated to the Virgin, although it was later destroyed by a 1692 hurricane. In 1694, the location was rebuilt upon, where an image of the Virgin of Regla was enthroned and donated by Pedro de Aranda. Since its donation, Our Lady of Regla has become a much-devoted object, and was declared patron saint of Regla on December 23, 1714.

==== In Santería ====
In the syncretic Afro-Cuban religion of Yorùbá (originally known as Santería) the Virgin is associated with Yemayá, the Yoruba orisha of the sea.

=== Philippines ===
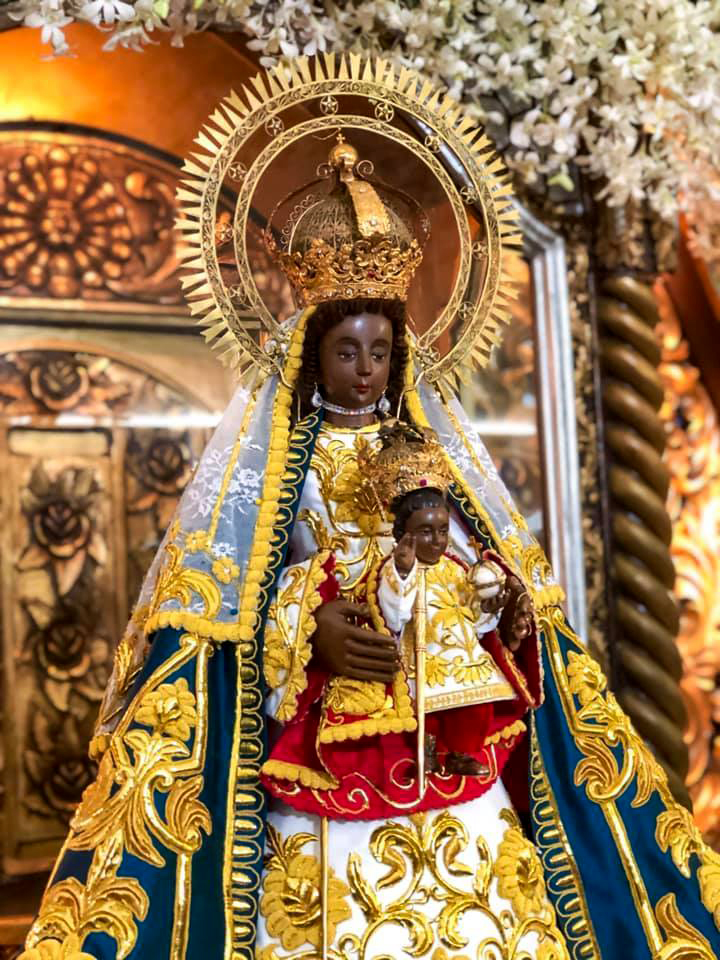
The image of Our Lady of the Rule of Opon enshrined in Lapu-Lapu City. It is the first Marian image in Cebu to be crowned.

Since 1735, the Catholic population of Lapu-Lapu City has had significant devotion to Our Lady of Regla. The image was initially taken to the former town by Augustinian missionary Francisco Aballe (1694–1759). After the Second World War, a new church was built under the patronage of Our Lady of Regla, with a new image made of polychrome hardwood.

== Legacy ==
There are various churches and hermitages dedicated to her, such as:

- Sanctuary of Our Lady of Regla (Chipiona, Spain)
- Hermitage of Our Lady of Regla (Pájara, Canary Islands)
- Hermitage of Our Lady of Regla (Santa Cruz de Tenerife, Canary Islands)
- Saint Mary of Regla de León Cathedral (León, Spain)
- Cathedral of the Holy Cross, Our Lady of Regla, and St Francis of Assisi (Chihuahua City, Mexico)
- Cathedral of Our Lady of Regla, Diocese of Baní, Santo Domingo
- Our Lady of Regla Orthodox Church (Miami, Florida)
