= Chipiona Lighthouse =

Lighthouse in Cádiz, Spain

Chipiona Lighthouse Punta del Perro
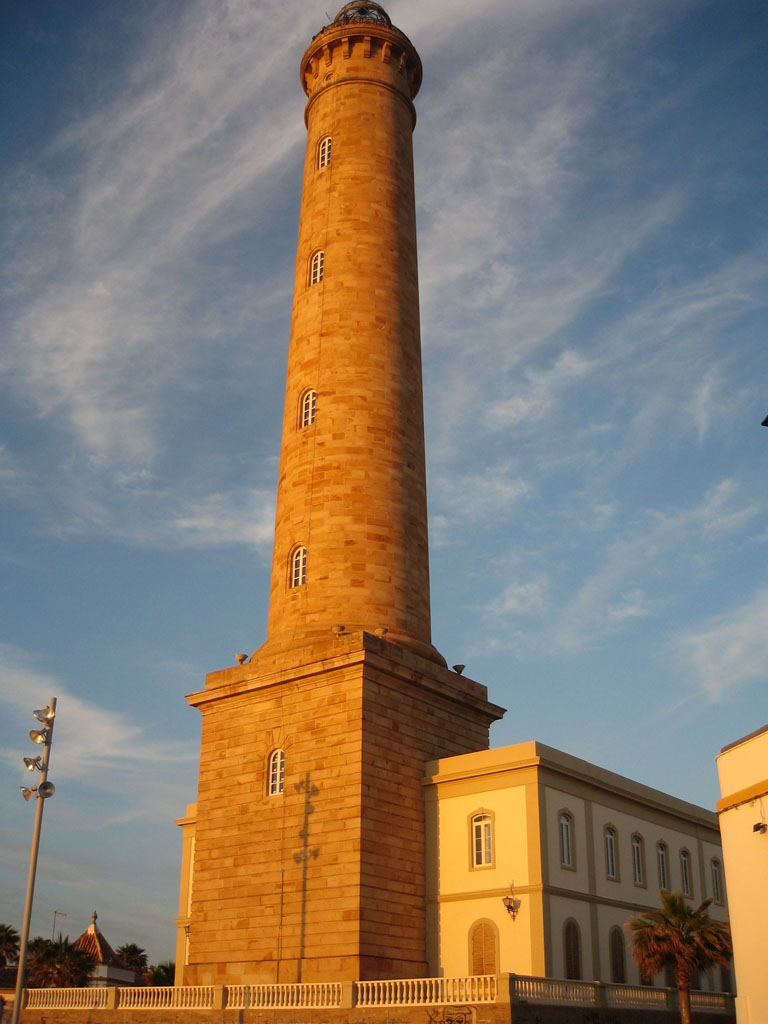
- Chipiona Light, 2007
- Location: Chipiona; Province of Cádiz; Andalusia; Spain
- Coordinates: 36°44′16.51″N 6°26′32.05″W

Tower
- Constructed: 1867
- Construction: cut stone tower
- Height: 205 feet (62 m)
- Shape: tapered cylindrical tower with balcony and lantern
- Markings: unpainted tower, white trim, grey lantern roof
- Operator: Autoridad Portuaria de Sevilla

Light
- Focal height: 226 feet (69 m)
- Range: 25 nautical miles (46 km; 29 mi)
- Characteristic: Fl W 10s.
- Spain no.: ES-09180

Chipiona Lighthouse (Spanish: Faro de Chipiona), also known as Punta del Perro Light, is an active 19th-century lighthouse in Chipiona, in the province of Cádiz, Spain. At 205 feet (62 m) tall, it is the seventeenth-tallest "traditional lighthouse" in the world and the tallest in Spain. It is located on Punta del Perro (lit. Dog Point), a projection of land into the Atlantic Ocean in the city of Chipiona, about 6 kilometres (3.7 mi) southwest of the Guadalquivir entrance, and serves as the landfall light for Seville.

== History ==
A previous lighthouse was present at the same site from the Roman period, and this former lighthouse gave Chipiona its name. This superb lighthouse was, according to Strabo, comparable with the famous Lighthouse of Alexandria. It was ordered to be built in 140 BC by the Roman proconsul Quintus Servilius Caepio in an attempt to finally overcome the problems of the Salmedina reef at the mouth of the then river Betis, now the Guadalquivir. Its Latin name Turris caepionis (Caepio's Tower), is traditionally held to be the origin of the name Chipiona.

The project to build a modern lighthouse on the site was first developed in 1862 by Jaime Font, a Catalan engineer. He laid the first stone on 30 April 1863, and it was lit for the first time in 1867. Since then, it has been temporarily shut off on just 2 occasions. The first time it was switched off was in 1898, during the war against the United States of America over the independence of Cuba; all the lighthouses around Cadiz were turned off because an invasion was feared. The second time was in 1936 during the Spanish Civil War, when it remained off for 3 years.

In December 1999 the illumination was changed to a new halogen lamp. This is visible 129 kilometres (70 nmi) away and flashes once every ten seconds.

== Construction ==
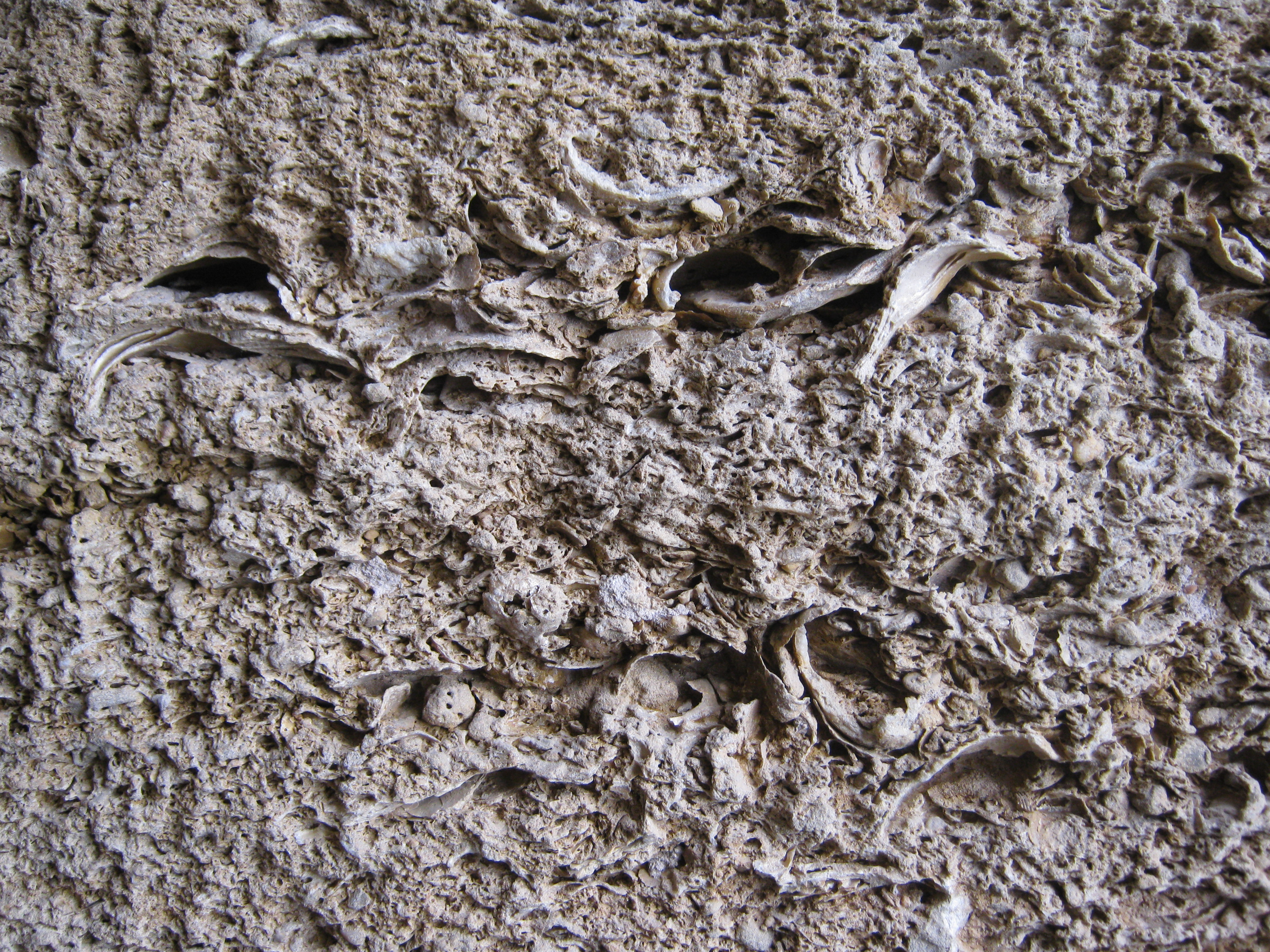
Mollusc shells visible in the oysterstone

The building is constructed in a slightly tapering column which is reminiscent of commemorative Roman columns. It is built of blocks of sandstone and oysterstone, a limestone sedimentary rock that is open in structure and with visible remains of mollusc shells, especially of the oyster family. It is used commonly in the southwest coastal towns and cities of Spain. Its base is a 4-storey square structure, which rises in front of a 2-storey keeper's house, painted white.

There are organised tours up the 344 steps to the balcony below the lantern room. These tours are available 5 days a week in summer and less frequently during other months.

== Current display ==
The light characteristic displayed is one white flash every ten seconds (Fl W 10s). The light is displayed at a focal height of 226 feet (69 m), and it is visible for 25 nautical miles (46 km; 29 mi).

== See also ==
- List of tallest lighthouses in the world
- List of lighthouses in Spain
