= Chipiona =

- Municipality
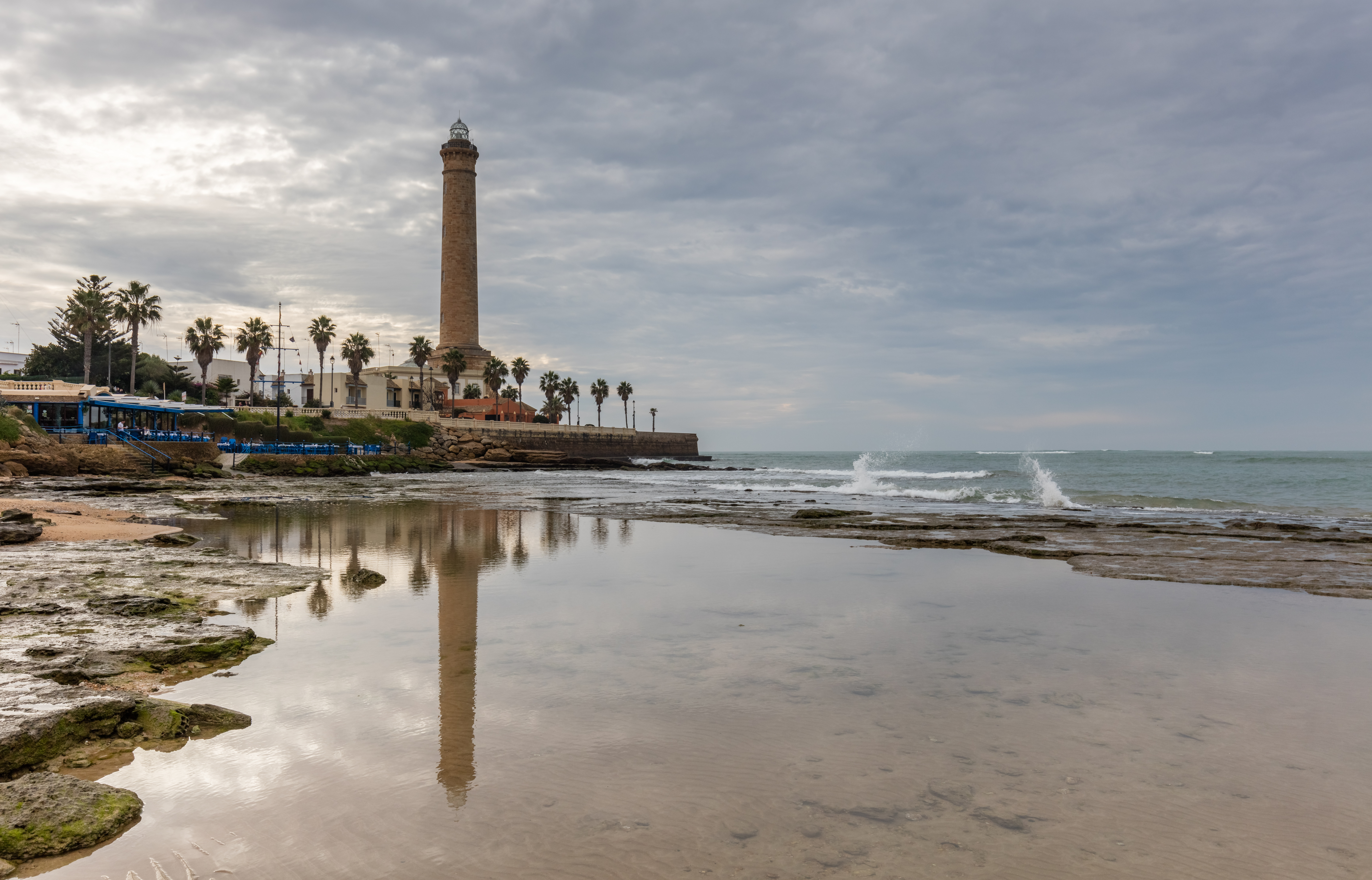
- Coast of Chipiona with the lighthouse at background

- Flag Coat of arms

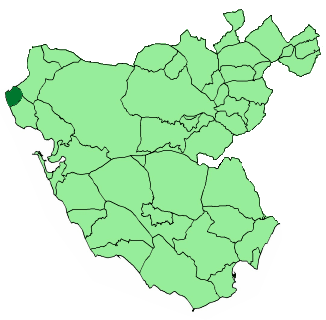
- Location of Chipiona

- Location in Andalusia
- Coordinates: 36°44′N 6°26′W
- Country: Spain
- Autonomous community: Andalusia
- Province: Cádiz
- Comarca: Costa Noroeste de Cádiz
- Commonwealth: Municipios del Bajo Guadalquivir

Government
  - Alcalde: Antonio Peña Izquierdo

Area
  - Total: 32.92 km^{2} (12.71 sq mi)
- Elevation: 4 m (13 ft)

Population (2021)
  - Total: 19,386
  - Density: 588.9/km^{2} (1,525/sq mi)
- Demonym(s): Chipionero, ra
- Time zone: UTC+1 (CET)
  - Summer (DST): UTC+2 (CEST)
- Postal code: 11550

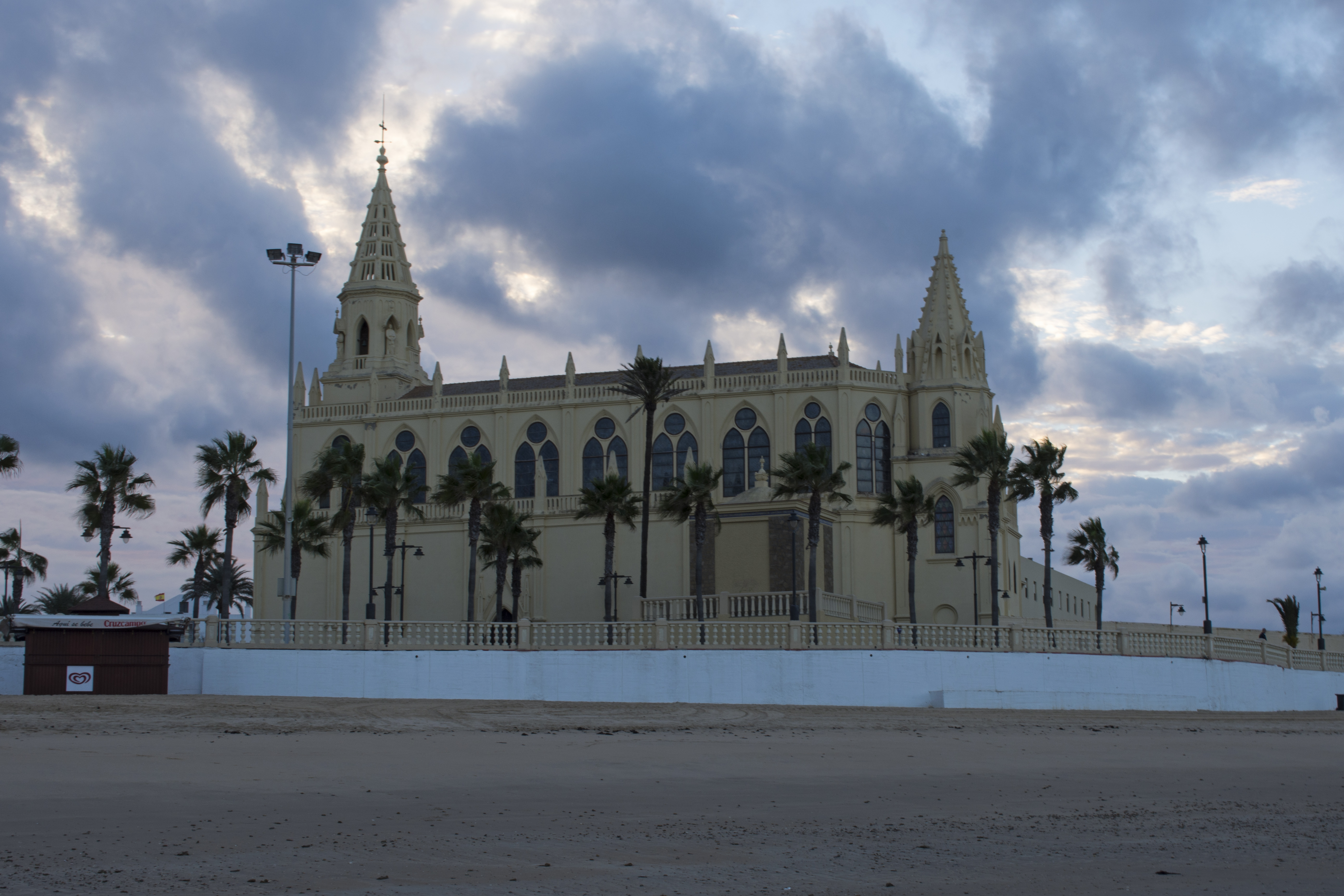
Sanctuary of Our Lady of The Rule, Chipiona.

Chipiona is a town and municipality located on the Atlantic coast in the province of Cádiz, Spain. According to the 2012 census, the city has a population of 18,849 inhabitants, but this amount increases greatly during the summer holiday period. The town covers an area of 33 km^{2}. Being in the lower valley of the River Guadalquivir it is very flat with a maximum terrestrial height of 4 metres. It is bordered on the north-west by Sanlúcar de Barrameda and on the south-east by the port of Rota.

It is the town of birth of singer Rocío Jurado and where her body now rests.

Chipiona is also home to the lighthouse Punta del Perro. The town is also well known for several varieties of Moscatel.

== Places of interest ==
- The Chipiona lighthouse is the most emblematic monument of the town. It is the largest lighthouse in Spain, the 3rd in Europe and the 5th in the world. Its height from the base is about 69 meters, dates from 1867 and is located in the Punta del Perro. It was built to prevent ships having problems accessing the river Guadalquivir and colliding with the Salmedina Rocks.
- The Marina: the early 1990s saw the construction of the Marina, located near the mouth of the Guadalquivir, in 2008 it was subjected to a process of enlargement.
- The Shrine of Our Lady of Regla: The current building of the shrine dates from the early 20th century, built by the Franciscan missionary community, with the help of the Duke of Montpensier. It was originally an ancient castle fortress of a 14th-century family, Ponce de Leon, who donated it to the Hermits of St. Augustine in 1399 to convert it into a church.
- Chipiona Castle: houses the Museum of Cadiz and the New World.
- Muscat Museum: Opened in 2012. Located in the Catholic Agricultural Cooperative.

== History ==
=== Antiquity ===
According to the geographers Strabo (Strabo, III, 1, 9) and Pomponius Mela (Mela, III, 4), of Ancient Greece and Rome respectively, a lighthouse existed at the mouth of the Guadalquivir River called Turris Caepionis. This was probably because it was built on the orders of the Roman Consul Quintus Servilius Caepion or his successors. The lighthouse marked a dangerous place for shipping and the opening of a navigable river, the Guadalquivir. Chipiona takes its name from the Roman Consul Caepion.

This area has also been identified as the site of the legendary Ars Gerionis, the tomb of Geryon, which stood at the end of a narrow cape that jutted into the sea, probably in what is now a reef known as the Stone of Salmedina, near Salmedina, or just Salmedina. These claims are based solely on the evidence of the literature and Roman archaeological findings dating from the second century B.C.

=== Middle Ages ===
Legend relates that the disciples of St. Augustine in Africa, fleeing the invasion of the Vandals, came by sea to Chipiona with the image of the Virgin of Regla. Tombstones have been found near the Shrine of Our Lady of Regla from the time of the Visigoths. After the islamization of the Iberian Peninsula in 711, according to tradition, the hermits hid the image in a cistern about thirty paces from the citadel, now a monastery. The picture remained hidden until a member of the Order of St. Augustine found it in the 14th century, according to legend, following a revelation from heaven. A Shrine to Our Lady of Regla was built around the cistern.

In 1251 Chipiona was conquered by King Ferdinand III, and again more definitively in 1264 by his son Alfonso X the Wise. In 1297, King Ferdinand IV granted Guzman el Bueno, founder of the House of Medina Sidonia, the Lordship of Sanlúcar, to which Chipiona belonged.

In 1303 the eldest daughter of Guzman el Bueno and Maria Alonso Coronel, Isabel Perez de Guzman, Fernan married Ponce de León, receiving as a dowry the towns of Rota and Chipiona, thereby becoming independent both of the Lordship of Sanlúcar and joining the possessions of the Ponce de León family, descendent of the Arcos House.

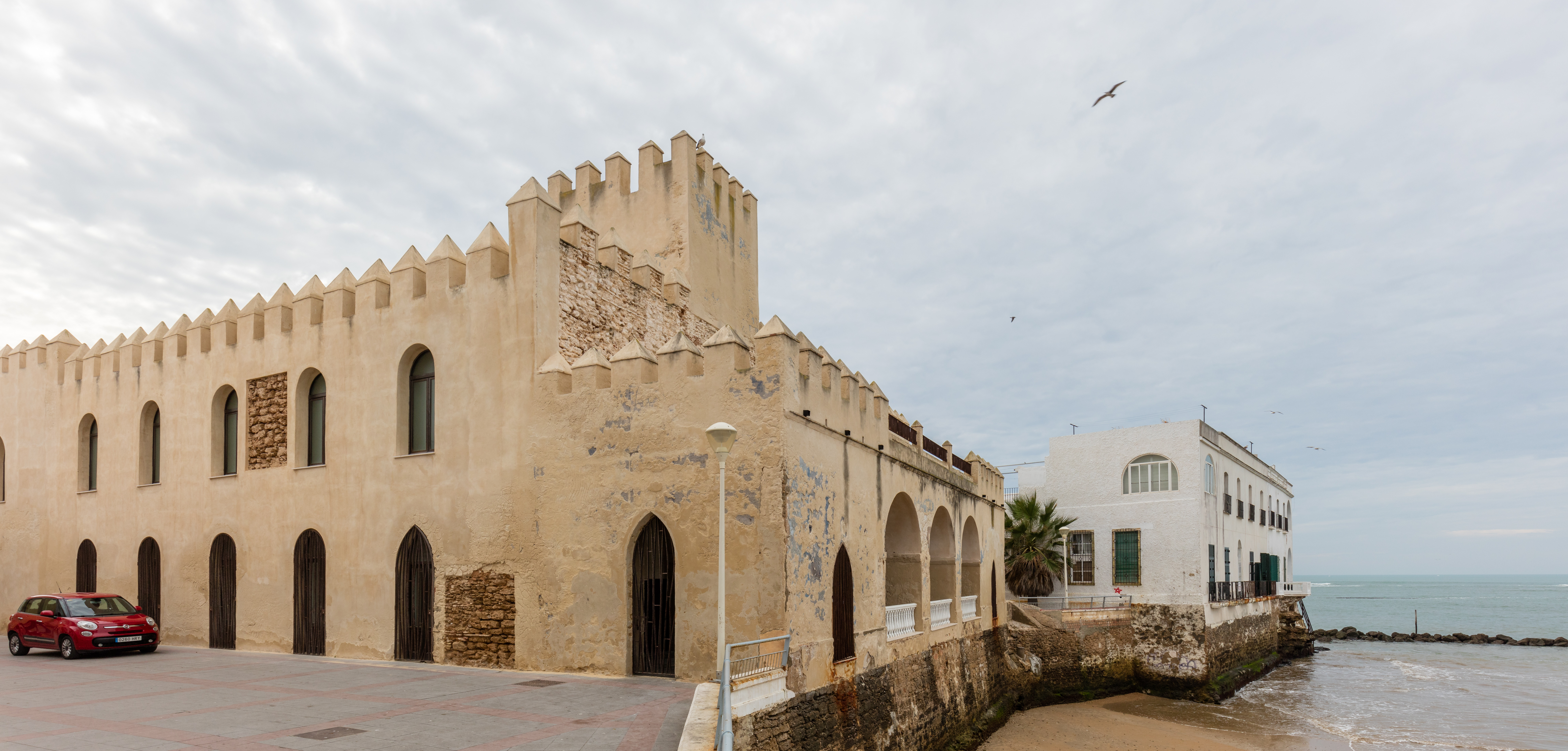
Castle of Chipiona.

=== Modern Age ===
In 1755, Chipiona was severely hit by the tsunami that was caused by the Andalusian and Portuguese Atlantic coast Lisbon earthquake. The effects of the tsunami came to town about an hour after the earthquake, killing four people and leaving flooded streets and beaches, estimating the actual damage to 238 815.

The image of Christ of Mercy was pulled in procession to request the withdrawal of the waters, a procession that is repeated every year in November, from the chapel that bears the name of Christ to the so-called Cross of the Sea (Cruz del Mar).

Earthquake Narration by the Community of the Holy Convent of Nuestra Señora Santa María de Regla, on December 6, 1755

On the aforementioned November 1 there wasn't any news from sunrise until 10 o'clock in the morning it was a serene and peaceful day, still and calm sea, a slight north wind. But, being as 10am, being this Community as a high choir solemnly singing the Terce, it began to feel that the choir, and the church with strange swaying motion and this, as visibly noticeable, that lectern, church lamps, candlesticks from the altar, and all the temple shook and moved like a crib, from one side to the other, as viewed from the North to the South.

We were warned that this was a terrible earthquake, and although it caused a corresponding fright in everybody, and we had the suspicion that the whole building, which [is] of stone, would collapse over us all, we lacked the freedom to leave the choir, all linked by the same superior impulse, and full of sure confidence in Patronage of Our Holy Image, which was clear to the eye on her majestic throne. At that point we bowed our knees, and straining our devotion, we continued with the canonical time more consistently.

The tremor would last for ten to twelve minutes, after the land had returned to stillness, the Community returned to their seats, attributing their safety to Divine Mercy, and the patronage of Holy Mary of Rule. The convent escaped major damage, and no damage was reported in its builldings.

Cantóse conventual Mass without the least suspicion, and concluded, was sung the sixth hour on the end of it, it would be like the 11 and fourth, there was a terrible roar of the sea, and found to be elevated both waves, violently throwing water on said bastion, and on the cliffs of the convent, were overwhelmed by a gunner, who was in it (which did not suffer any damage, having invoked the patronage of Our Holy Image), and fell upon the walls of the convent, and running for their flooded trenches surrounded the Church and its 2 sides to enter through the front door of the Farm, looking to the East.

Surprised by this unanticipated boost the ocean, some religious who were outside, and within the choir, acceleration fled to the fields, keeping others in the same choir.

== Demographics ==
Demographics evolution of Chipiona during the period 1842-2021
De jure census population, according to the INE.
De facto census population, according to the INE.

== Festivities and traditions ==
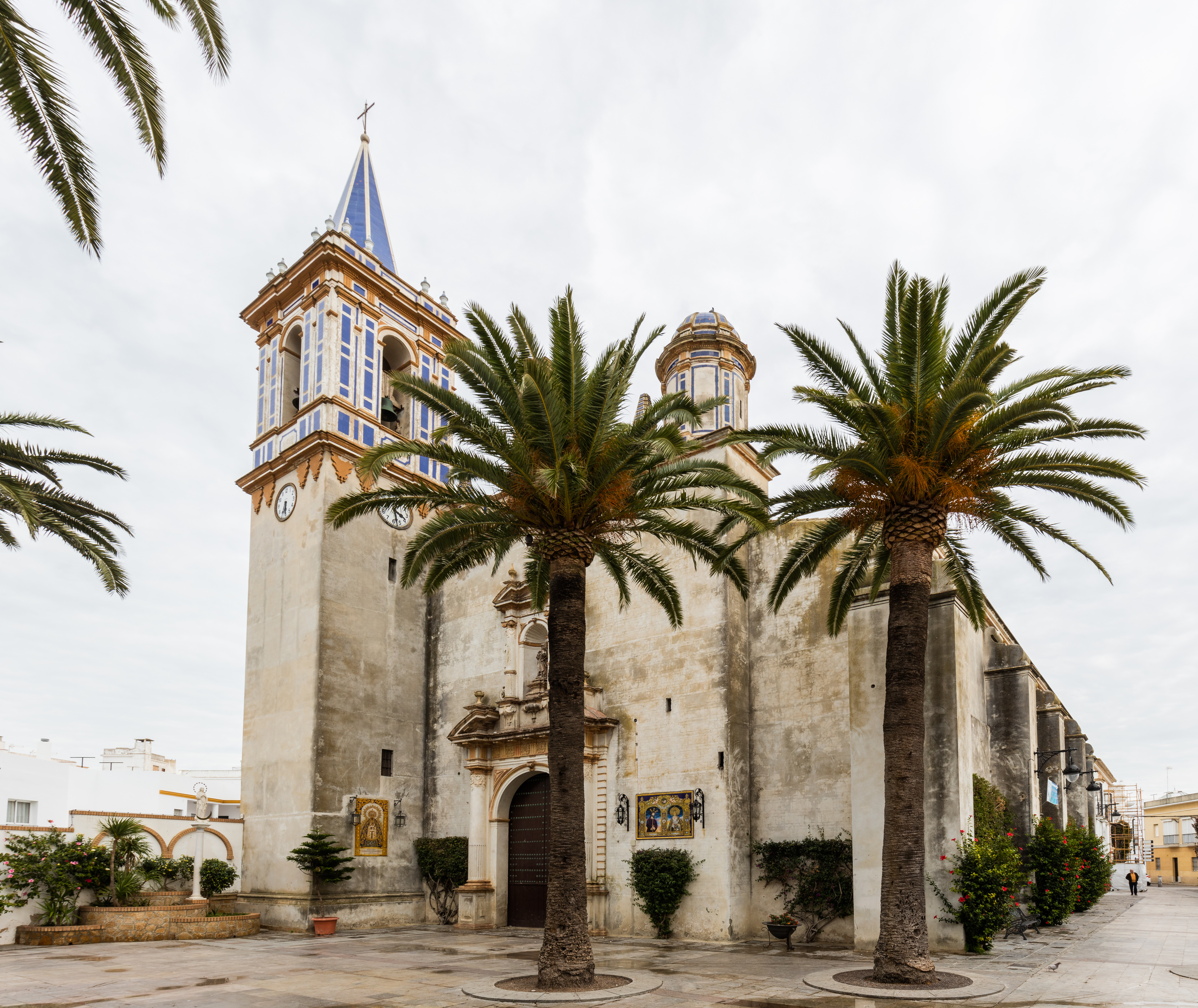
Church of Our Lady of O.

- Carnival: Carnival is a celebration with a long tradition in the municipality, the oldest documented reference to it being an 1896 City Council Edict, which regulates the proceedings and confirms that the celebration clearly dates from an earlier era. During the Franco period carnival celebrations were banned in Spain. In 1984 the institution was restored and since then the festival is held annually in the months of February and March. The festival closes with a horse parade, which is followed throughout the region
- Easter: Chipiona has two penitential brotherhoods:
- the Sisterhood and Nazarene Brotherhood of Our Father Jesus Captive, dating from 1960. The Virgin of Sorrows is an eighteenth-century anonymous work. The Brotherhood performs penitence on the day of Holy Thursday.
- the Brotherhood Holy Christ of Mercy, which performs penitence on Good Friday. The image of Christ of Mercy has enjoyed great popular support since the Great Lisbon Earthquake of November 1755, during which the image of Christ was paraded in supplication. This event is commemorated on 1 November each year, when the image of the Holy Christ of Mercy is paraded in a procession of thanksgiving. In 2006 the Brotherhood also paraded the image of Our Lady of Piety, to whom penitence is performed on Wednesday of Holy Week.
- Pinar Pilgrimage: Pilgrimage is held on the first Sunday of June in the Pinar de la Villa, in which the Virgin of Regla del Pinar, after transferring three days previously to the Shrine of Our Lady of Regla, returns to its pinewood accompanied by horsemen, carts and the general public.
- Our Lady of Mount Carmel: The patron saint of sailors is paraded on her feast day of 16 July, being taken out to sea at noon and paraded through the seas of the Villa. During the afternoon a procession through the main streets of the town ending with a fireworks display on the beach of the Sea Cross (Cruz del Mar).
- Evening Rule: They are dedicated to Our Lady of Regla and celebrated at the Shrine of Our Lady of Regla. Culminating with the release of Our Lady of Regla on September 8 and ending with a fireworks display on the beach of Regla.
- Halloween and Feast of All Saints: It is increasingly frequent in the evening of October 31 children go out dressed as monsters and spooks in the streets to ask for candy from door to door. On November 1, Feast of All Saints, a Thanksgiving procession of the Holy Christ of Mercy takes place to recognise the miracle performed in the Lisbon tsunami.
- Christmas: The city is decorated with Christmas lights. The Association of Bethlehem "Caepionis" was formed and organises many activities, such as nativity courses, making Christmas cards, a live nativity scene, a nativity scene contest or the Sermon of Christmas. Zambombás (drum bands) are traditionally organised by different neighbourhoods and village associations. On the afternoon of January 5 there is the procession of the Three Kings of the East, which since 2009 have performed a worship of the Child of God in the Plaza Pio XII.

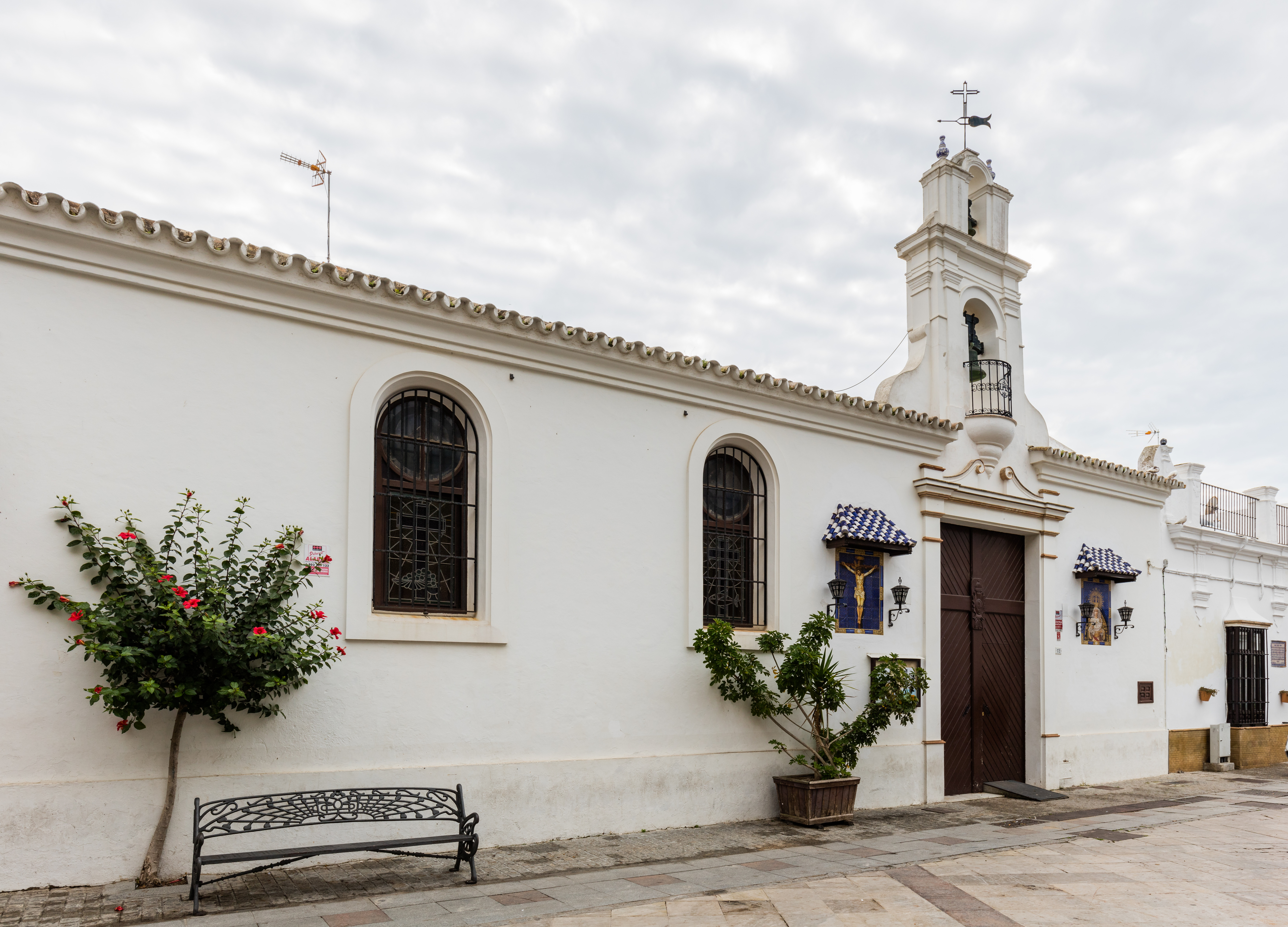
Hermitage of Christ of the Mercies.

== See also ==
- Chipiona Light
- List of municipalities in Cádiz
