= Sanlúcar de Barrameda =

City in Andalucía, Spain known for cuisine, history, and tourism

- Municipality
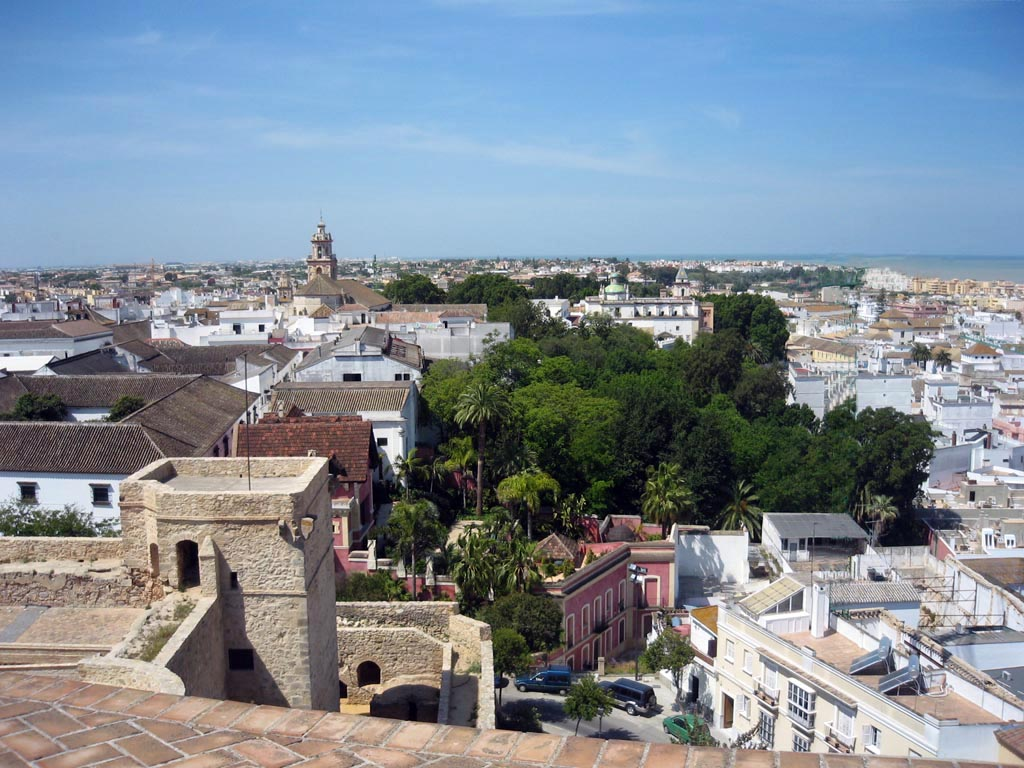
- Barrio Alto in Sanlúcar de Barrameda

- Flag Coat of arms

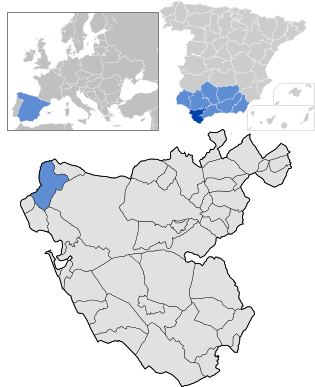
- Location of Sanlúcar de Barrameda

- Location in Spain
- Coordinates: 36°46′N 6°21′W
- Country: Spain
- Autonomous community: Andalusia
- Province: Cádiz
- Comarca: Costa Noroeste de Cádiz

Government
  - Mayor: Carmen Álvarez Marín (IU)

Area
  - Total: 170.93 km^{2} (66.00 sq mi)
- Elevation: 30 m (98 ft)

Population (2025-01-01)
  - Total: 70,012
  - Density: 409.59/km^{2} (1,060.8/sq mi)
- 68,656
- Demonym: sanluqueño/a
- Time zone: UTC+1 (CET)
  - Summer (DST): UTC+2 (CEST)
- Postal code: 11540
- Dialing code: 956
- Official language(s): Spanish
- Website: Official website

Sanlúcar de Barrameda (Spanish pronunciation: [sanˈlukaɾ ðe βaraˈmeða]), or simply Sanlúcar, is a city in the northwest of Cádiz province, part of the autonomous community of Andalucía in southern Spain. Sanlúcar is located on the left bank at the mouth of the Guadalquivir River opposite the Doñana National Park, 52 km (32 mi) from the provincial capital Cádiz and 119 km (74 mi) from Seville, capital of the autonomous community of Andalusia. Its population is 68,656 inhabitants (National Institute of Statistics 2019).

Sanlúcar has been inhabited since ancient times, and is assumed to have belonged to the realm of the Tartessian civilization. The town of San Lucar was granted to the Spanish nobleman Alonso Pérez de Guzmán in 1297.

Its strategic location made the city a starting point for the exploration, colonization and evangelization of America between the 15th and 17th centuries. Sanlúcar lost much of its strategic value after 1645 because of the disgrace of the House of Medina Sidonia, the general decline of Spain under Charles II, the relocation of the Casa de Contratación to the town of Cadiz in 1717, and the Lisbon earthquake of 1755.

In the 19th century the economy of the city was converted to viticulture and summer tourism. The 20th century brought destruction and political upheaval as it did elsewhere in Spain during the Spanish Civil War. Sanlúcar was declared a Cultural Historical-artistic site in 1973. Since the restoration of democracy (1975–1982) its town council has borrowed heavily, making Sanlúcar the city with the lowest per capita income in Spain.

Sanlúcar is a summer tourist destination famous for its cuisine, especially manzanilla (a variety of fino sherry) and prawns. It is internationally renowned for beach horse racing and flamenco music. Less well known but equally important are the historical archives of the House of Medina Sidonia (Archivo de la Casa de Medina Sidonia); the major part of the patrimony of the House of Medina Sidonia is located in the palace of the same name. The patron saint of the city is Our Lady of Charity, to whom it was dedicated in 1917.

== Etymology ==
Concerning the etymology of both names, there is no consensus among scholars, but several hypotheses have been advanced:

- Sanlúcar's name may have derived from the Arab šurūq (Arabic: شروق), the Arabic name for the Levant wind called sirocco or jaloque.
- According to the National Statistics Institute of Spain, the Sanlúcar toponym does not exist. However, there is historical mention of Brother Alfonso Sanlúcar de Barrameda, a Franciscan who was bishop of the Canaries-Rubicon in the period 1404–1417, and Fray Juan de Sanlúcar, a Franciscan who served in the same office from 1470–1474. As for the name Barrameda, it is unique to people born in the Canary Islands, according to census data from 1 January 2006. The historical relations between the House of Medina Sidonia, Sanlúcar, and the Canaries may explain the presence of these surnames in the Canaries. Barrameda was derived from bar-am-ma'ida, an Arabic phrase for "water well of the plateau".

== Geography ==
Sanlúcar de Barrameda is located on the Atlantic coast of the autonomous community of Andalusia, in the province of Cadiz, specifically on the left side of the mouth of the Guadalquivir River, which separates the provinces of Huelva and Seville. The municipality covers an area of 174.3 km^{2} (67.3 sq mi) with 6 km (3.7 mi) of beaches.

The city is part of the tourist area known as the Costa de la Luz (Coast of the Light), about 44 km (27 mi) from the provincial capital of Cádiz. This includes the marshes of the Pinar de la Bonanza Algaida and the marshes of the Guadalquivir, part of the Doñana Natural Park.

Sanlúcar de Barrameda borders the municipalities of Trebujena, Jerez de la Frontera, Rota, Puerto de Santa María, and Chipiona. Its topography is shown in the MTN50 sheet (scale 1:50,000) No. 1047 of the National Topographic Map.

== History ==
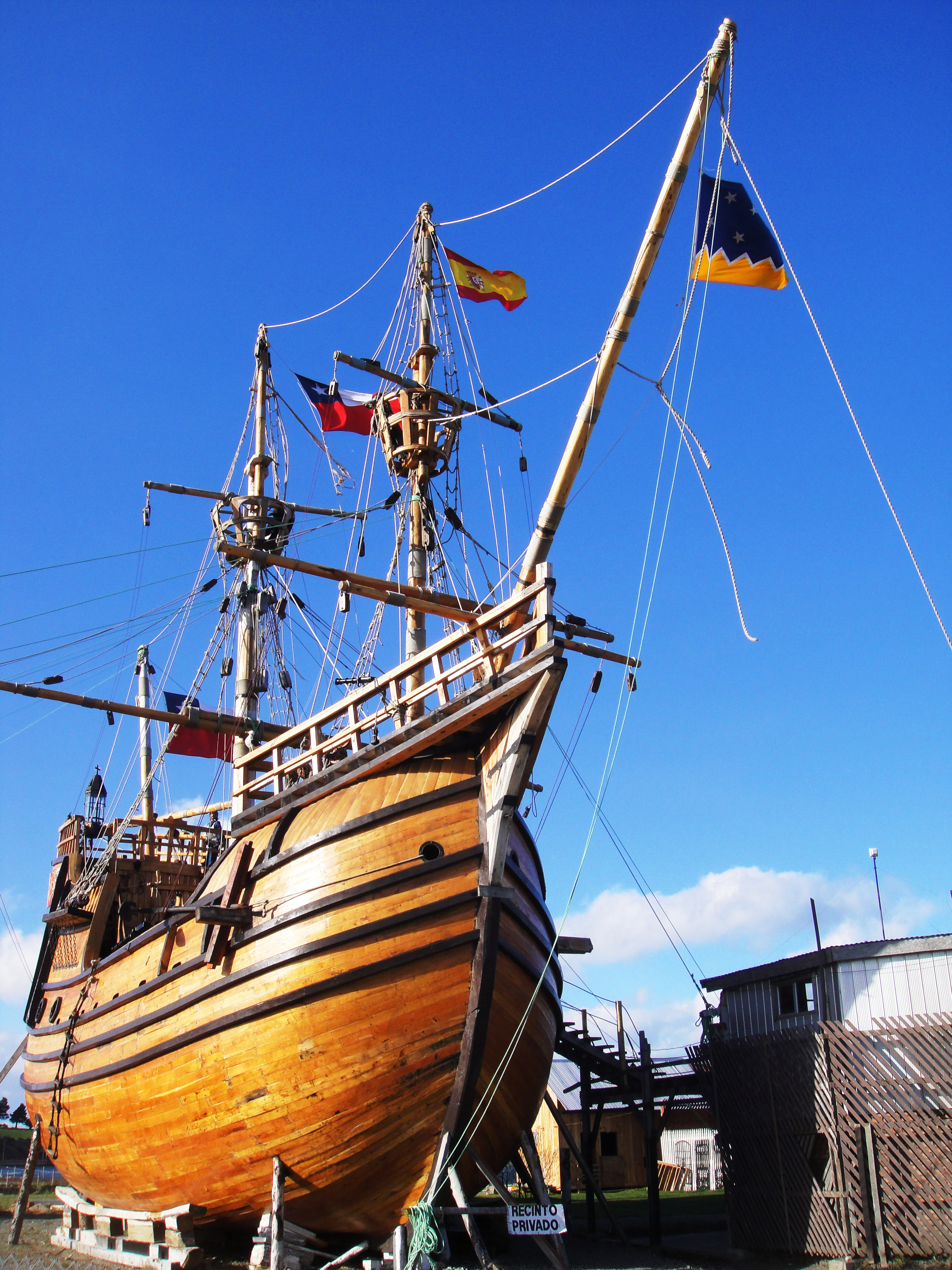
Nao Victoria, Magellan's boat Replica in Punta Arenas

In 1264, after Sanlúcar de Barrameda was seized from the Moors by King Alfonso X of Castile, it was reconstituted as the capital of the Señorío de Sanlúcar, and became during the 15th and 16th centuries one of the most important ports for trade connecting the Atlantic coast with the Mediterranean.

After the discovery of the New World, Sanlúcar developed as a port for refitting ships, and was the point of departure for various Spanish conquistadors. On 30 May 1498 Christopher Columbus left for his third voyage from Sanlúcar (See Voyages of Christopher Columbus). Another historical departure was that of Ferdinand Magellan on 10 August 1519, who with a fleet of five ships under his command left Seville and traveled down the Guadalquivir to Sanlúcar de Barrameda at its mouth, where they remained more than five weeks. Sanlúcar also witnessed the arrival in 1522 of the last surviving ship of Magellan's expedition, the 'Nao Victoria commanded by Juan Sebastián Elcano, which was the first ship to circumnavigate the world.

Alonso Fernández de Lugo, conqueror of the Canary Islands, of La Palma (1492) and Tenerife (1495), and subsequently the governor of the islands, was born in Sanlúcar.

The ill-fated expedition to Florida led by Pánfilo de Narváez left from Sanlúcar on 17 June 1527. Only four members survived including Álvar Núñez Cabeza de Vaca who described the expedition in his work Naufragios.

== Main sights ==
Sights include:

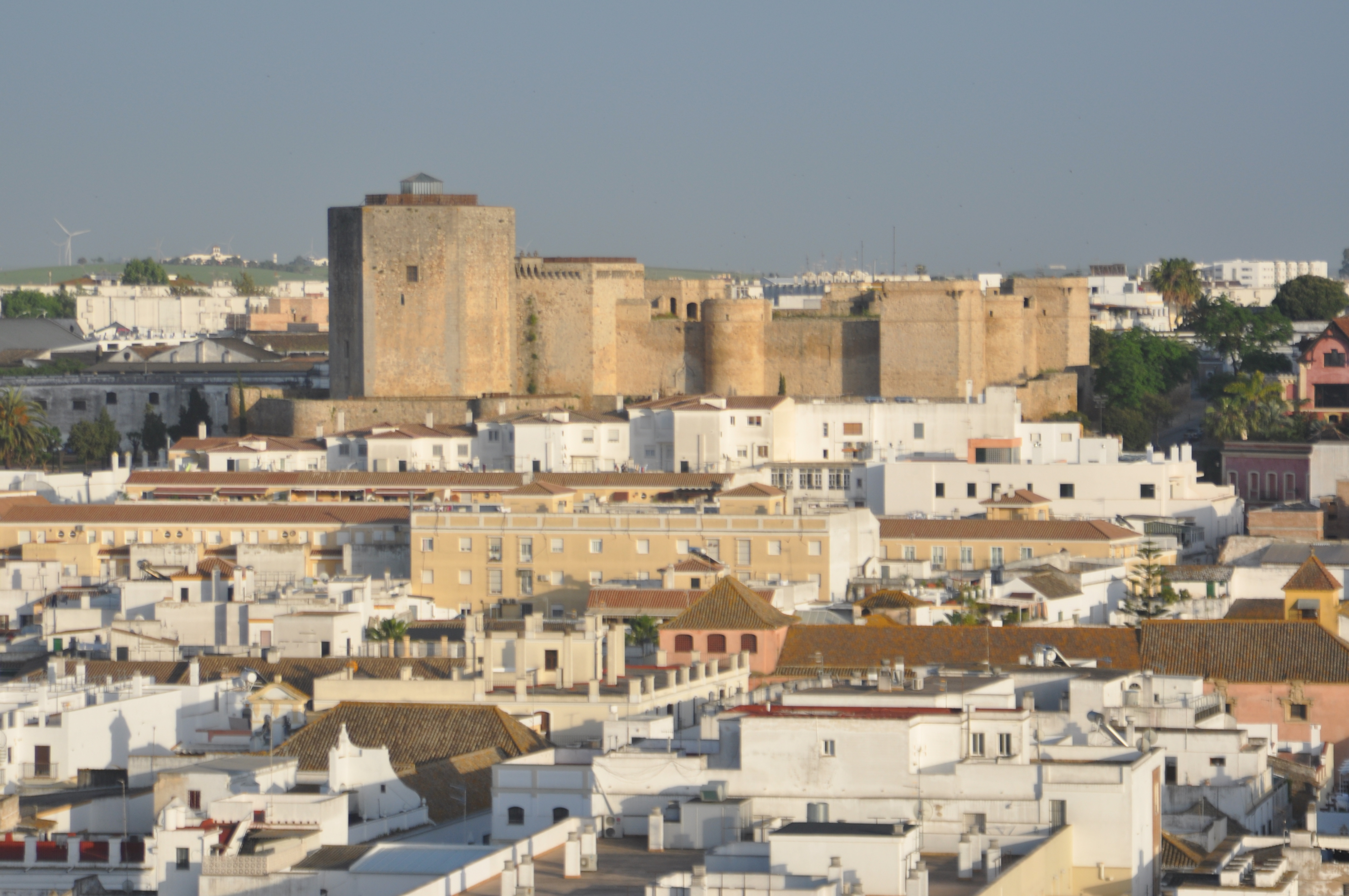
Castle of Santiago, Sanlúcar de Barrameda

- Historic center of Sanlúcar de Barrameda
- Castle of Santiago, from the 15th century
- Palace of the Infantes of Orleans and Borbón, which is now used as the City Hall
- Palace of the Dukes of Medina Sidonia; it includes the house of Medina Sidonia, which now houses the municipal archives
- Palace of Arizón, which now houses the General catalogue of historic heritage of Andalusia; part of the house is now a hotel
- Church of Nuestra Señora de la O
- church of Santo Domingo, a 16th-century building
- Church of Merced
- Convent of San Francisco
- Las Covachas
- Ébora
- Bastion of San Salvador
- Fortifications of Sanlúcar de Barrameda

== Culture ==
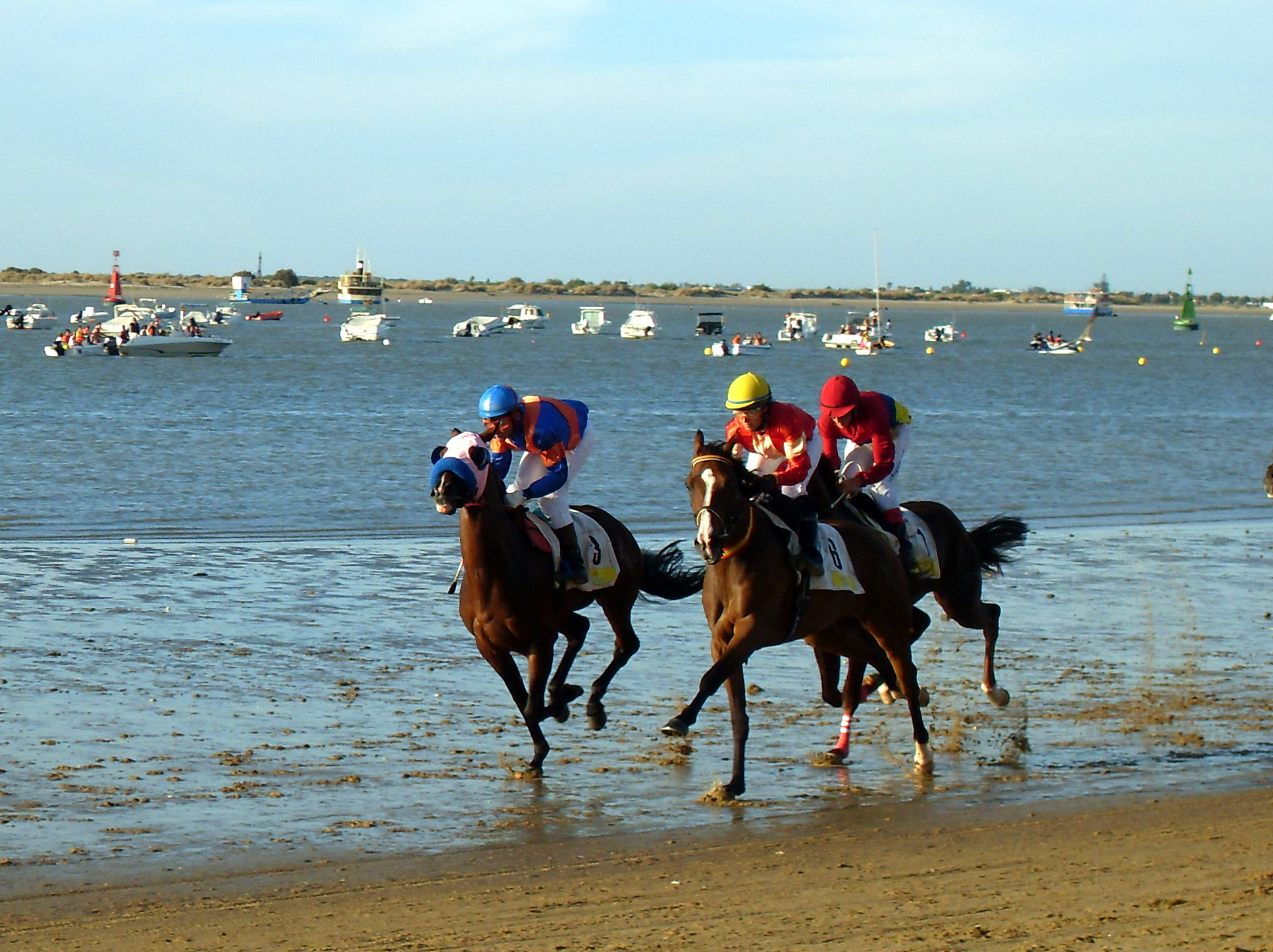
Horse racing on the beach in Sanlúcar

Sanlúcar de Barrameda is one of the three original towns forming the "triangle of xérès", or sherry-producing towns. (The other two are Jerez de la Frontera, for which sherry is named, and El Puerto de Santa María.)

Although a seaside town, Sanlúcar de Barrameda is also home to the oldest horse races in Spain and some of the oldest in Europe. The races take place just before sunset along the beach at the mouth of the river Guadalquivir every August before thousands of spectators. Contested at distances of 1500 m and 1800 m, these were the first regulated horse races in Spain; the riders wear distinctive colours and caps.

Other annual events include the Sanlúcar Tapas Fair, a local gastronomy competition; the Feria de la Manzanilla in late May, which is held at the beginning of the Noches de Bajo de Guía flamenco season; classical and jazz festivals; and the occasional concert by a major act. The city is also known for the Romería de El Rocío pilgrimage, one of the more popular expressions of the Roman Catholic faith; it can be compared to the pilgrimages to Santiago or Lourdes.

Sanlúcar has had since ancient times a popular taste for bullfighting and has given the world of bullfighting several well-known bullfighters including Manuel Hermosilla y Llanera, José Martínez Ahumada ("Limeño"), Francisco Ojeda González ("Paco" Ojeda), Julio Vega Rodríguez ("Marismeño"), José Luis Parada, and Manuel Rodríguez Blanco ("El Manguin").

== Transport ==
The nearest airports are Jerez Airport, located 34 km (21 mi) east, Seville Airport, located 108 km (67 mi) north east and Gibraltar Airport, located 133 km (83 mi) southeast of the city.

== People ==
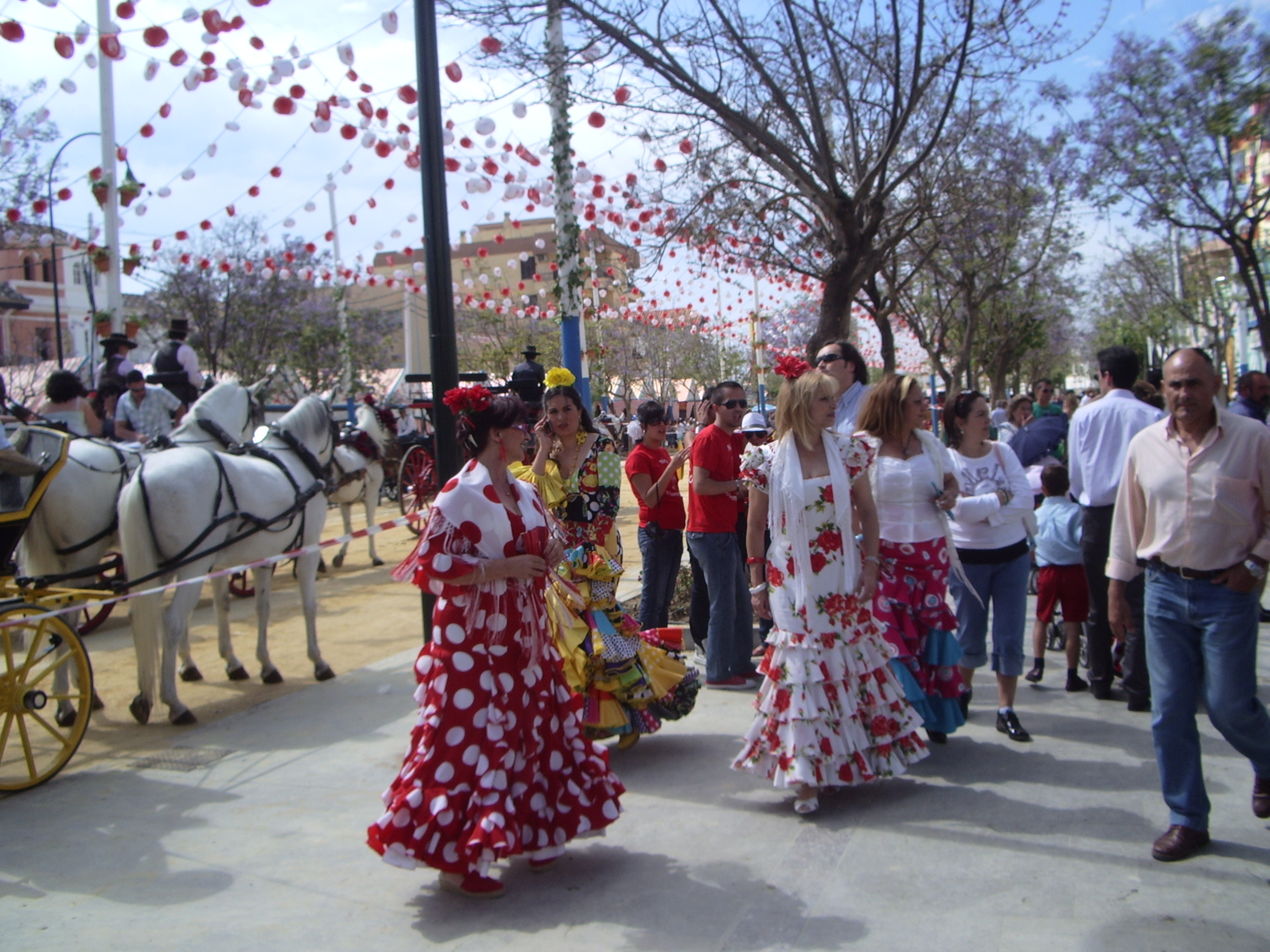
La Manzanilla festival.

People in Sanlúcar historically worked primarily in agriculture (mainly viticulture) and fishing (especially for the famous Sanlúcar prawn). These two occupations were naturally concentrated in different parts of the town, and until the modernizing trends of the last few decades, there were marked distinctions between the people living in each area. People living near the sea, in the area known as Bajo de Guía, were almost exclusively dedicated to fishing. Now these same people combine fishing with managing restaurants that rely on fresh fish and shellfish for their menus. People living in the higher elevations away from the sea, in a part of the town known as the Barrio Alto, formerly dedicated themselves exclusively to agriculture. However, with the advent of mechanisation this sector requires less manpower throughout the year, and most farm workers now work only seasonally during the grape harvest, in the so-called "sherry triangle".

The centre of Sanlúcar developed as a commercial hub, with a cityscape of intermixed historic buildings (monasteries, churches, etc.) and more modern ones. This part of the city developed at the beginning of the 20th century as the neighbourhood of the bourgeoisie and the aristocracy. Sanlúcar was then a popular beach resort; presently the people living in this area are generally linked to local wine-making interests and the tourist industry.

== Doñana National Park ==
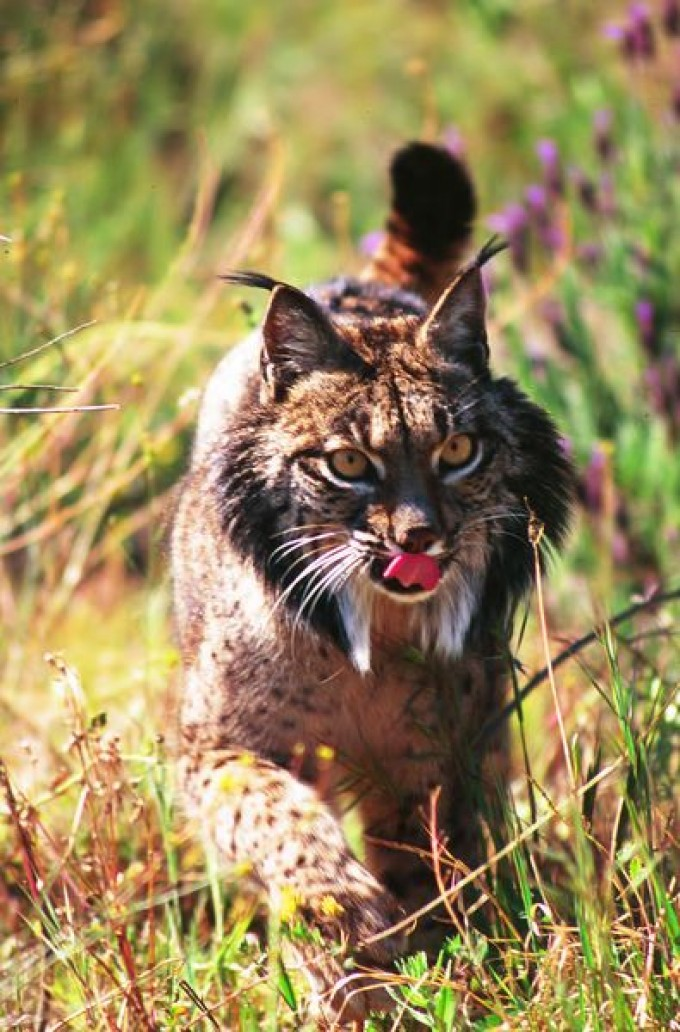
Iberian lynx in Doñana National Park.

Because of its position at the mouth of the Guadalquivir, Sanlúcar is a convenient home base for exploring the nearby Doñana National Park (Parque Nacional de Doñana) and its natural features. Within the park lies the Marisma de Hinojos (Salt Marsh of Fennel Plants); also within its precincts is the possible site of the legendary lost city of Tartessos, the capital of an ancient civilization that predated the Phoenicians in Iberia.

== Gallery ==
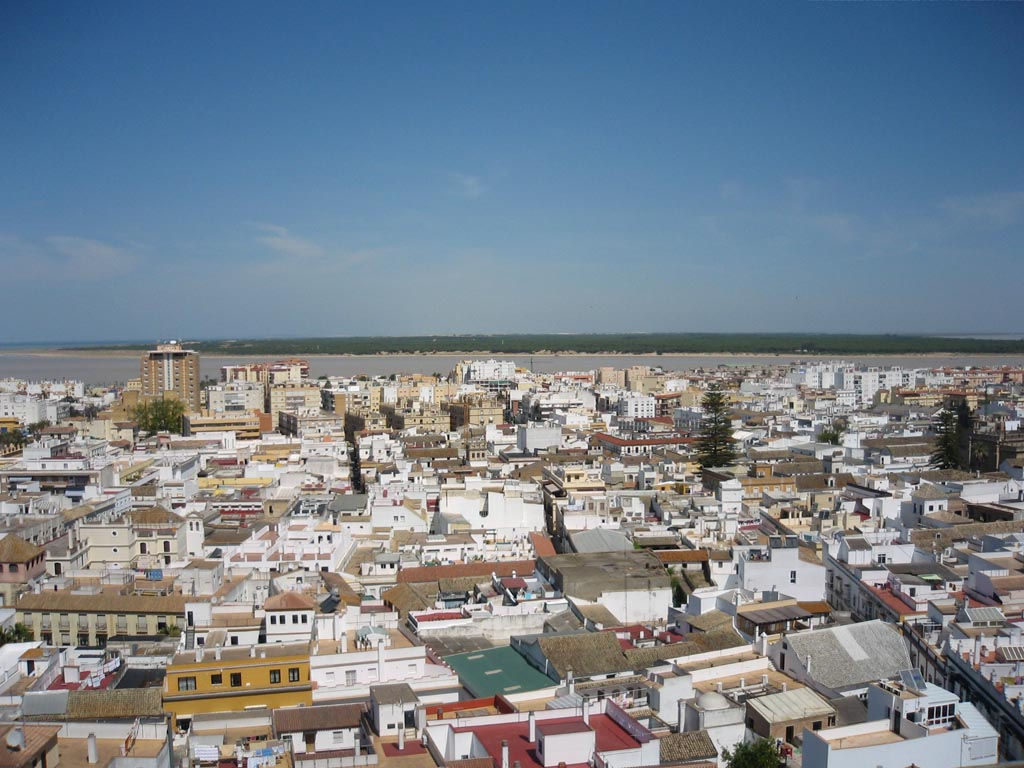
Barrio Bajo

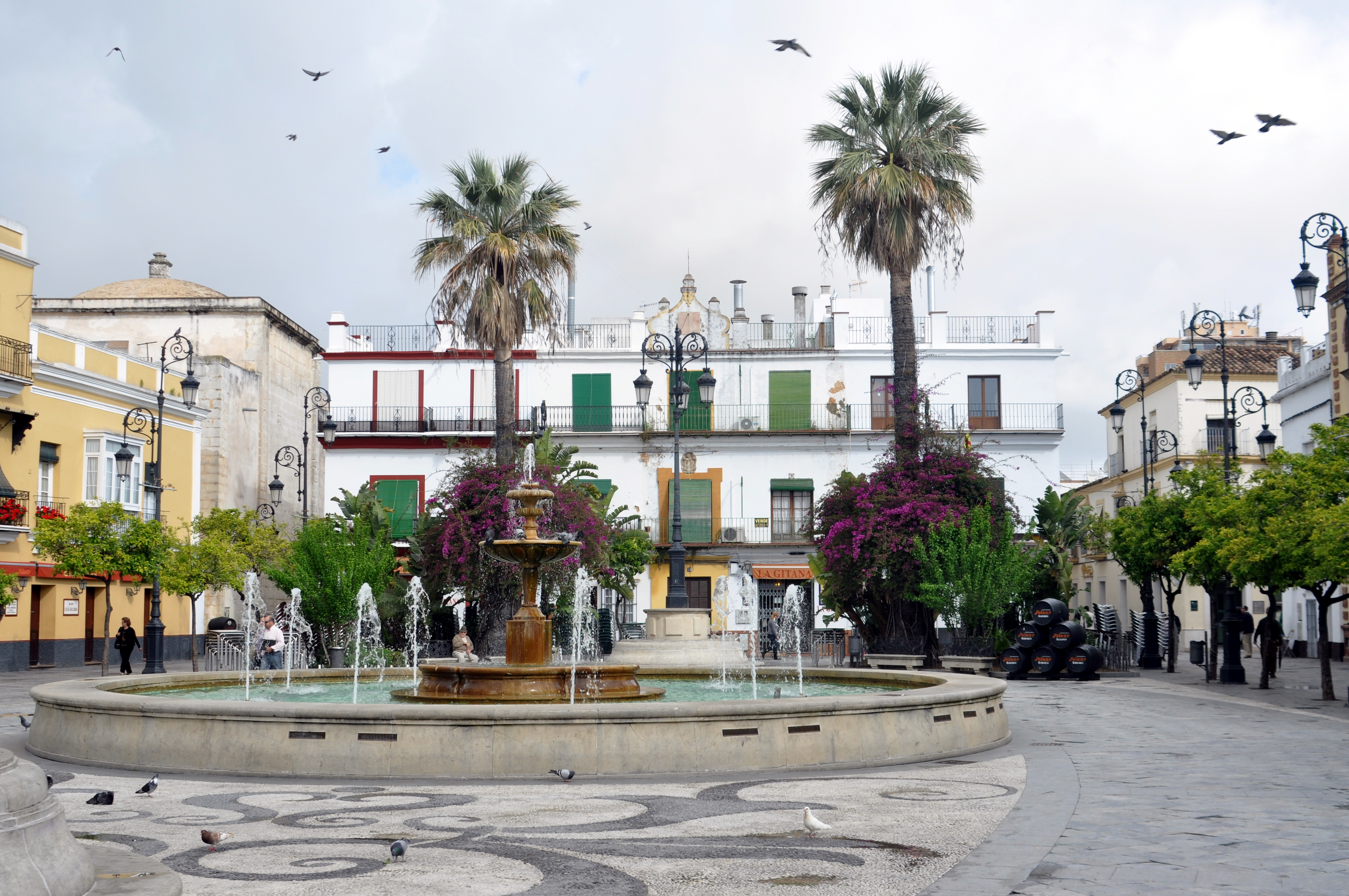
Plaza del Cabildo

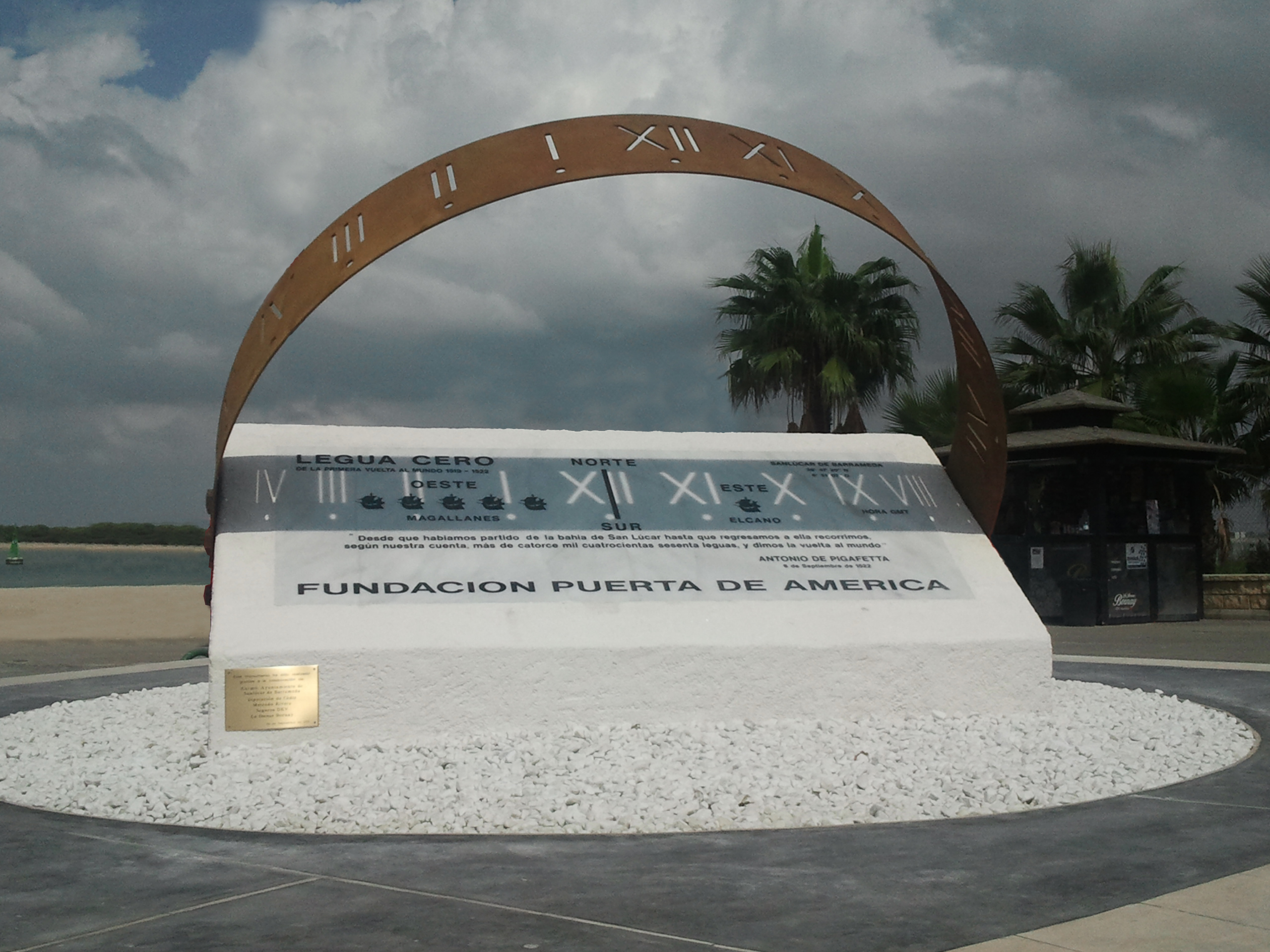
Monument "Legua Cero-Sanlúcar de Barrameda, Cádiz, España". Commemorating first world circumnavigation

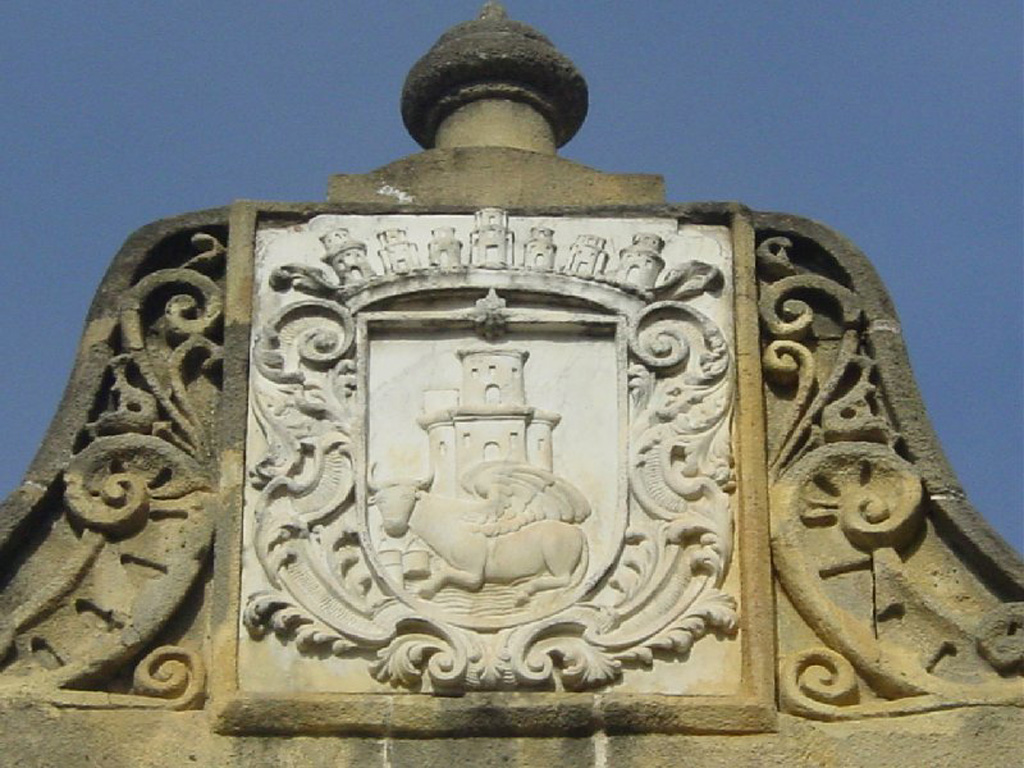
Shield on the market square

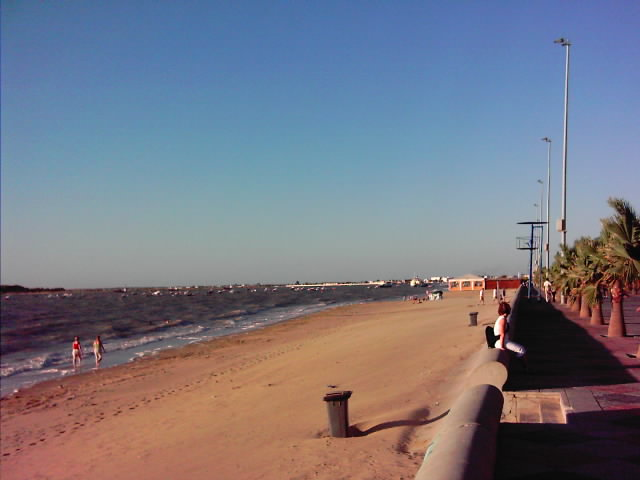
Beach

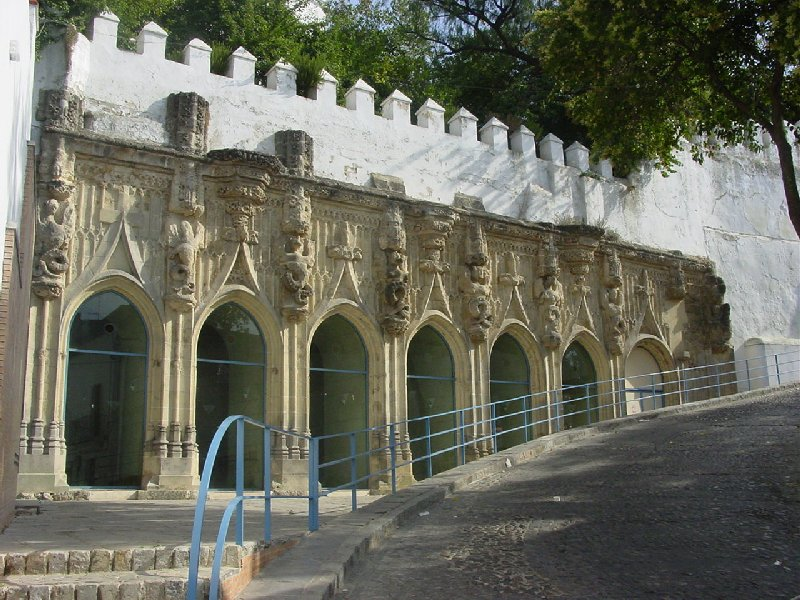
Las Covachas

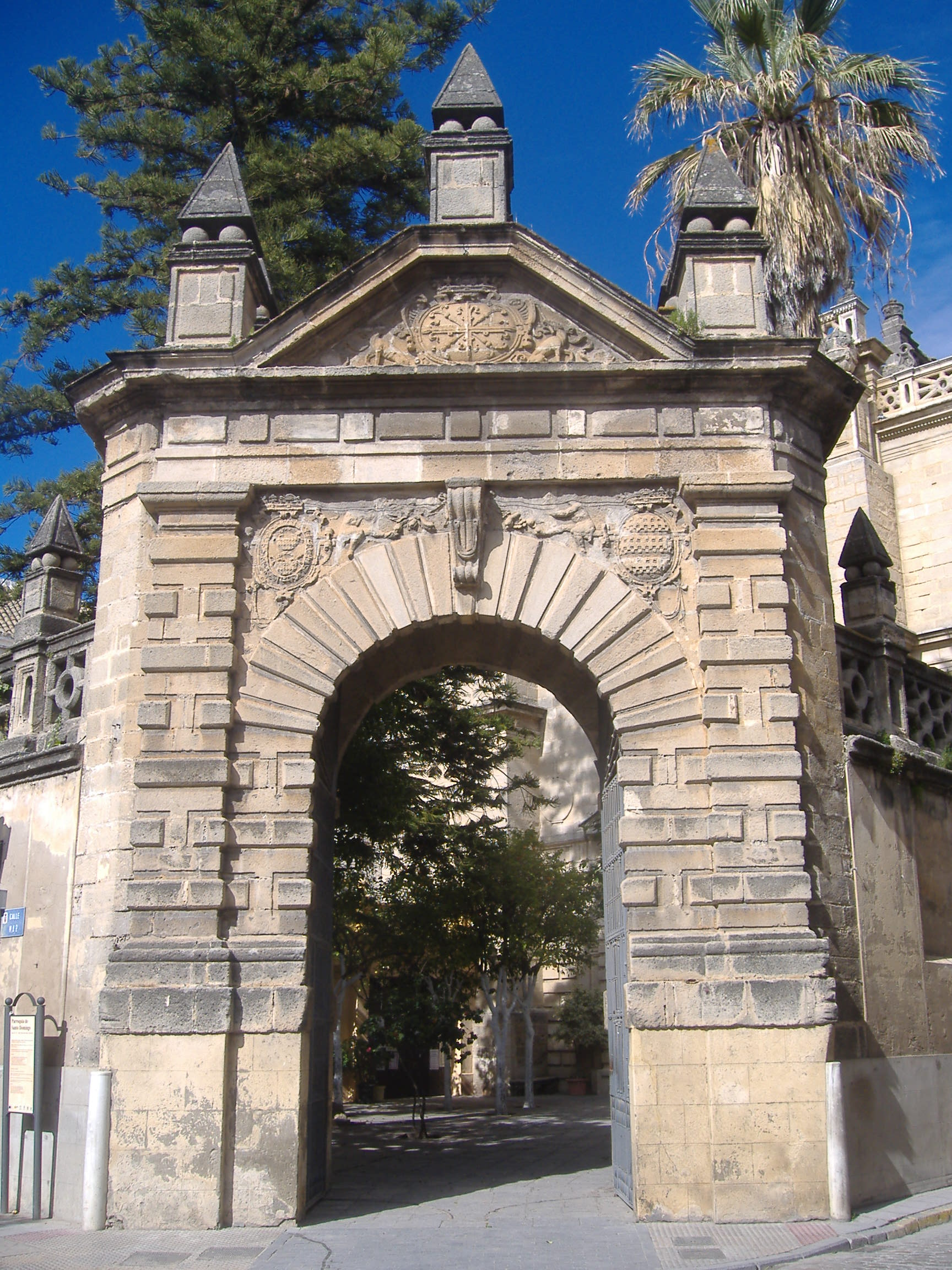
Santo Domingo church

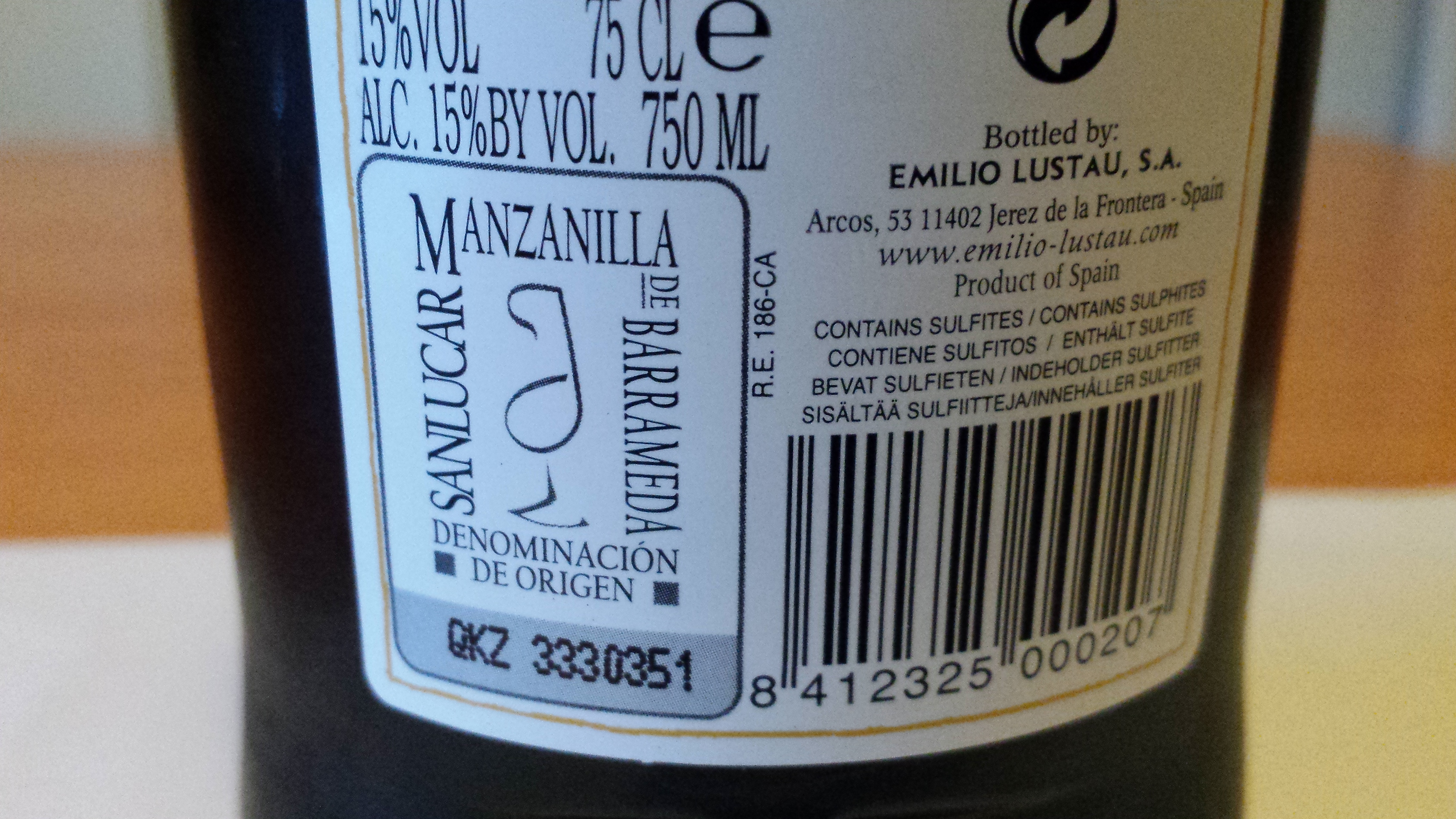
Official DO label Manzanilla on the back of a Sanlúcar de Barrameda region wine bottle

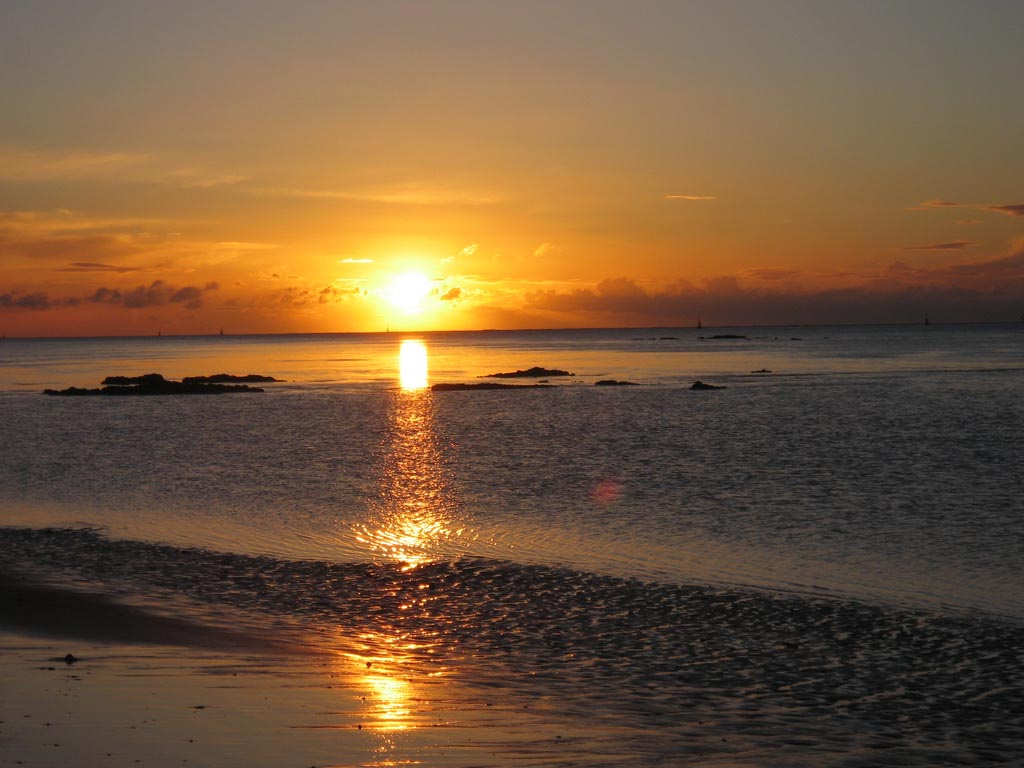
Sunset in Sanlúcar.

== See also ==
- Costa de la Luz
- Atlético Sanluqueño CF
- History of Sherry
- List of municipalities in Cádiz
