= Trebujena =

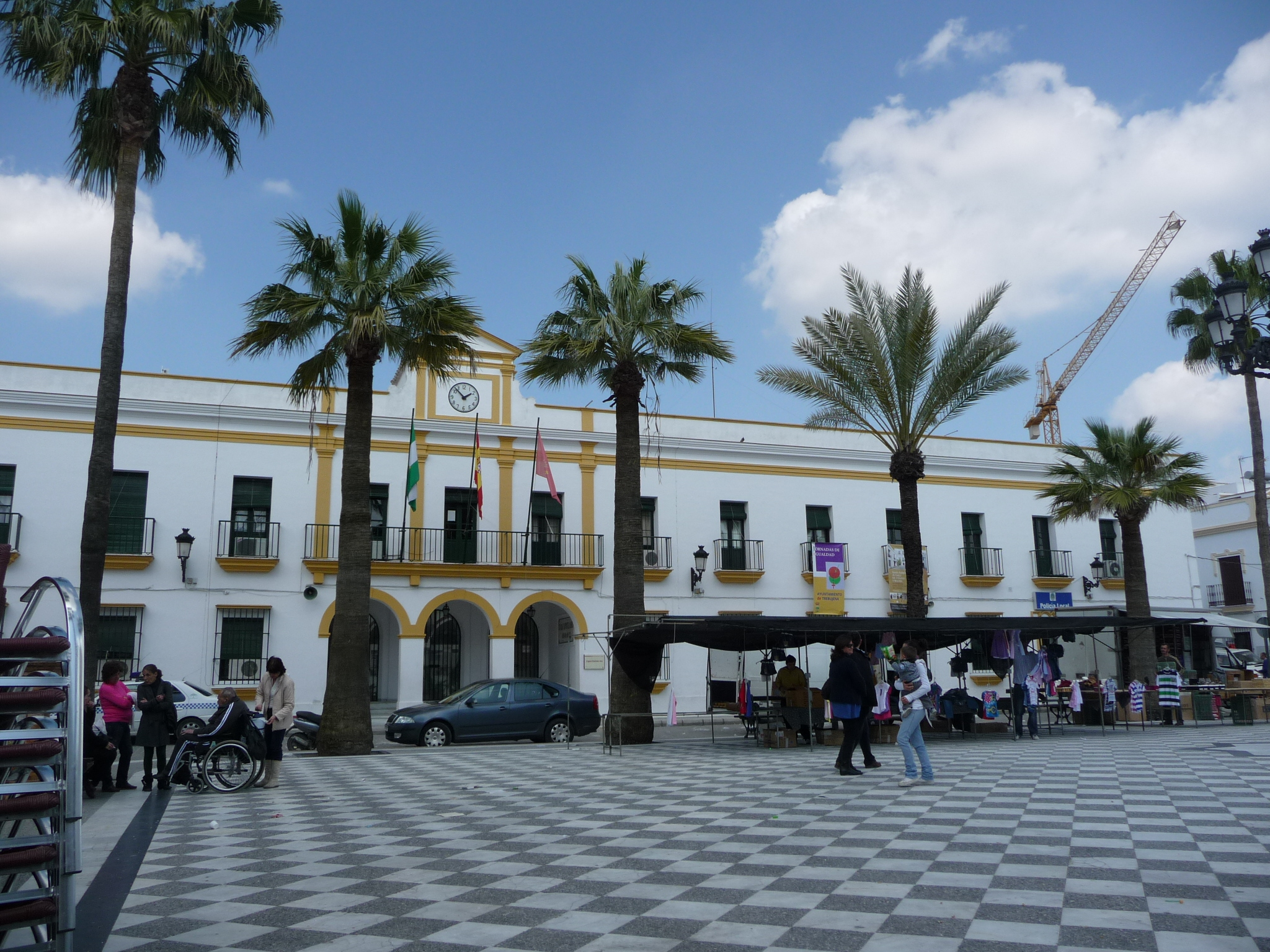
- Town Hall.

- Flag Coat of arms

- Location of Trebujena Trebujena (Andalusia) Trebujena (Spain)
- Coordinates: 36°52′N 6°10′W
- Country: Spain
- Autonomous community: Andalusia
- Province: Cádiz
- Comarca: Costa Noroeste de Cádiz
- Municipality: Trebujena

Government
  - Mayor: Ramón Galán Oliveros (IULV-CA)

Area
  - Total: 69 km^{2} (27 sq mi)

Population (2025-01-01)
  - Total: 6,999
  - Density: 100/km^{2} (260/sq mi)
- Time zone: UTC+1 (CET)
  - Summer (DST): UTC+2 (CEST)
- Postal code: 11560
- Website: Official website

Trebujena is a city and municipality located in the province of Cádiz, part of Andalusia in southern Spain. The area is known for its labor movement and its vineyards.

== Population and geography ==
As at 1 January 2015 it had 7,072 inhabitants. Its surface area is 70 km² and has a density of 101.27 people / km². It is located at an altitude of 69 meters and 57 kilometers from the provincial capital, Cadiz. The neighboring towns are Jerez de la Frontera and Sanlúcar de Barrameda in the province of Cadiz and Lebrija in the province of Seville. The environment is countryside with hilly land and marshy land within six kilometers of the river Guadalquivir.

== Politics ==
The town is known for its strong labor movement. Farm workers revolted against landowners in the 19th century In the 1930s, according to Joe Foweraker, the vineyard workers had a close relationship with their work, and a humanist tradition. The Confederación Nacional del Trabajo and Communist Party both featured in the area at this time.

In 1979, Félix Bayón noted that two thirds of the population voted for the Communist Party of Spain.

=== Election 2015 ===
Party	Seats	Votes	Percentage
IULV-CA (United Left/The Greens–Assembly for Andalusia)	7	1990	46.57
PSOE-A (Spanish Socialist Workers' Party of Andalusia)	5	1369	32.04
Por Trebujena Si Se Puede (Podemos)	1	460	10.77

== See also ==
- List of municipalities in Cádiz
