= List of Catholic dioceses in South Africa, Botswana, and Swaziland =

The Catholic hierarchy of South Africa is entirely Latin, composed of five ecclesiastical provinces, each under a Metropolitan Archbishop, with a total of 20 suffragan South African dioceses and an exempt pre-diocesan apostolic vicariate, as well as three suffragans (two dioceses, one apostolic vicariate) from below-mentioned neighbor states (fellow former British colonies).

Botswana has only one diocese and one apostolic vicariate, both suffragan of the South African Metropolitan Archbishop of Pretoria.
Swaziland only has a single diocese, suffragan of the South African Metropolitan of Johannesburg.
Neither of those warranting a nation Episcopal conference, their tiny episcopates partakes in the transnational Episcopal Conference of South[ern] Africa, despite its one-nation name.

None of them has an Eastern Catholic jurisdiction, only South Africa has an exempt Military ordinariate.

There are no titular sees. All defunct jurisdictions have current Latin successor sees.

There also is an Apostolic Nunciature to South Africa as papal diplomatic representation at embassy-level in the national capital Pretoria. There formally are an Apostolic Nunciature to Botswana and an Apostolic Nunciature to Eswatini, but both are vested in the Apostolic Nunciature to South Africa (as are the Apostolic Nunciature to Namibia and to the kingdom of Lesotho, which have their own Episcopal conferences).

== Current Latin dioceses ==
=== Exempt (South Africa only) ===
- Military Ordinariate of the South African Defence Force, vested in the Metropolitan Archdiocese of national capital Pretoria
- Apostolic Vicariate of Ingwavuma (pre-diocesan)

=== Latin provinces (including Botswana and Swaziland) ===
==== Ecclesiastical Province of Bloemfontein ====
(South Africa only)

- Metropolitan Archdiocese of Bloemfontein
  - Diocese of Bethlehem
  - Diocese of Keimoes-Upington
  - Diocese of Kimberley
  - Diocese of Kroonstad

==== Ecclesiastical Province of Cape Town ====
(South Africa only)

- Metropolitan Archdiocese of Cape Town
  - Diocese of Aliwal
  - Diocese of De Aar
  - Diocese of Oudtshoorn
  - Diocese of Port Elizabeth
  - Diocese of Queenstown

==== Ecclesiastical Province of Durban ====
(South Africa only)

- Metropolitan Archdiocese of Durban
  - Diocese of Dundee
  - Diocese of Eshowe
  - Diocese of Kokstad
  - Diocese of Mariannhill
  - Diocese of Umtata
  - Diocese of Umzimkulu
  - Apostolic Vicariate of Ingwavuma

==== Ecclesiastical Province of Johannesburg ====
including all Eswatini

- Metropolitan Archdiocese of Johannesburg
  - Diocese of Klerksdorp
  - Diocese of Manzini, covering all and only Eswatini
  - Diocese of Witbank

==== Ecclesiastical Province of Pretoria ====
including all Botswana

- Metropolitan Archdiocese of Pretoria
  - Diocese of Francistown in Botswana
  - Diocese of Gaborone in Botswana
  - Diocese of Pietersburg
  - Diocese of Rustenburg
  - Diocese of Tzaneen

== See also ==
- List of Catholic dioceses (structured view)

== Sources and external links ==
- GCatholic.org - data for all sections.
- Catholic-Hierarchy entry.
