= Peter John Holiday =

South African Catholic prelate (born 1952)

The Most Reverend Peter John Holiday
- Bishop Emeritus of Kroonstad, South Africa
- Church: Catholic Church
- Archdiocese: Archdiocese of Bloemfontein
- See: Diocese of Kroonstad
- Appointed: 1 April 2011
- Installed: 25 June 2011
- Term ended: 12 December 2022
- Predecessor: Stephen Brislin
- Successor: Amos Mabuti Masemola

Orders
- Ordination: 10 December 1992
- Consecration: 25 June 2011
- Rank: Bishop

Personal details
- Born: Peter John Holiday; 11 January 1952 (age 74) Durban, Archdiocese of Durban, Kwazulu Natal, South Africa

Styles of Peter John Holiday
- Reference style: Your Lordship; The Most Reverend
- Spoken style: His Lordship
- Religious style: Bishop

Peter John Holiday (born 11 January 1952) is a South African Catholic prelate who was the bishop of the Roman Catholic Diocese of Kroonstad, in the Ecclesiastical Metropolitan Province of Bloemfontein, in the Republic of South Africa from 1 April 2011 until his health-related resignation on 12 December 2022. He was appointed bishop on 1 April 2011 by Pope Benedict XVI and was consecrated on 25 June 2011 by Jabulani Adatus Nxumalo, Archbishop of Bloemfontein. Before that, from 10 December 1992 until 1 April 2011, he was a priest of the Catholic Archdiocese of Johannesburg. Pope Francis accepted the resignation of Bishop Peter John Holiday on 12 December 2022 due to the bishop's ill health.

== Background and education ==
He was born on 11 January 1952, in Durban, Archdiocese of Durban, Kwazulu Natal, in the Republic of South Africa. He attended the Salesian Boys High School, in Cape Town from 1967 until 1969. He then apprenticed as a printer and obtained a diploma in "Letterpress Machine Handling" in 1973. He worked in that role for the next 13 years. He then studied at Saint Peter's Major Seminary in Hammanskraal, in Gauteng. Later, he studied advanced theology at the Pontifical Urban University, in Rome, Italy.

== Priesthood ==
He was ordained a priest for the Archdiocese of Johannesburg on 10 December 1992. He served as a priest until 1 April 2011. While a priest, he served in various roles and locations including:

- Assistant parish priest at Our Lady of Mercy Parish in Emdeni Soweto from 1993 until 1997.
- Parish priest at Saint Thomas Parish, in Lenasia, from 1997 until 1999.
- Administrator of Christ the King Cathedral from 2000 until 2005.
- Parish priest at Our Lady of the Wayside Parish, in Maryvale from 2006 until 2011.
- Archdiocesan Director for the Lenten Appeal from 2006 until 2011.
- Archdiocesan assistant director for vocations from 2006 until 2011.

== As bishop ==
On 12 December 2011, Pope Benedict XVI appointed Reverend Father Peter John Holiday, previously a member of the clergy of Johannesburg as the new bishop of the Diocese of Kroonstad. He succeeded Bishop Stephen Brislin, who had been appointed archbishop and transferred to the Archdiocese of Cape Town on 18 December 2009. Bishop Holiday was consecrated at Kroonstad on 25 June 2011, by the hands of Jabulani Adatus Nxumalo, Archbishop of Bloemfontein assisted by Stephen Brislin, Archbishop of Cape Town and Buti Joseph Tlhagale, Archbishop of Johannesburg.

On 12 December 2022, Pope Francis accepted the resignation letter submitted by Bishop Peter John Holiday from the pastoral care of the Catholic Diocese of Kroonstad, in South Africa. He lives on as Bishop Emeritus of that Catholic See.

== See also ==
- Catholic Church in South Africa

== Succession table ==
Catholic Church titles
Preceded by Stephen Brislin (17 October 2006 - 18 December 2009)	Bishop of Kroonstad (1 April 2011 - 12 December 2022)	Succeeded by Amos Mabuti Masemola (since 17 February 2026)
