= Santa Maria Domenica Mazzarello =

Santa (=Saint) Maria Domenica Mazzarello may refer to:

- Saint Maria Domenica Mazzarello, Italian founder of the Salesian Sisters
- Santa Maria Domenica Mazzarello titular church, in Rome, dedicated to her, for cardinal-priest
