= Cathedral of Christ the King, Johannesburg =

Coordinates: 26.193354°S 28.052004°E

Cathedral of Christ the King
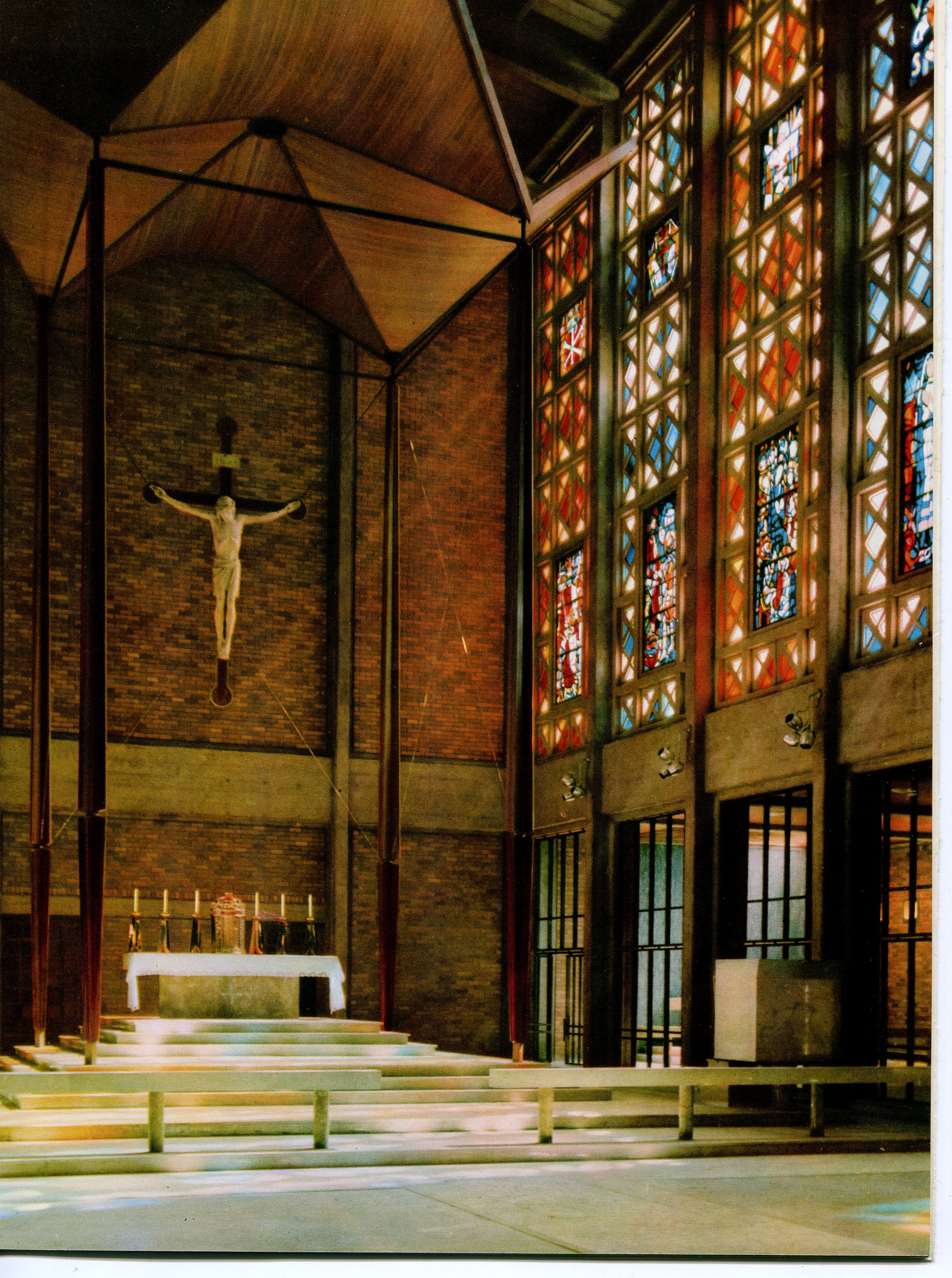
- Cathedral of Christ the King

General information
- Status: Active
- Type: Modern Catholic Cathedral
- Location: 1 Saratoga Ave, Berea, Johannesburg
- Completed: 1958

Height
- Roof: 81 feet (25 m)

Technical details
- Floor count: 1

Design and construction
- Architects: Brian Gregory and John P. Monahan

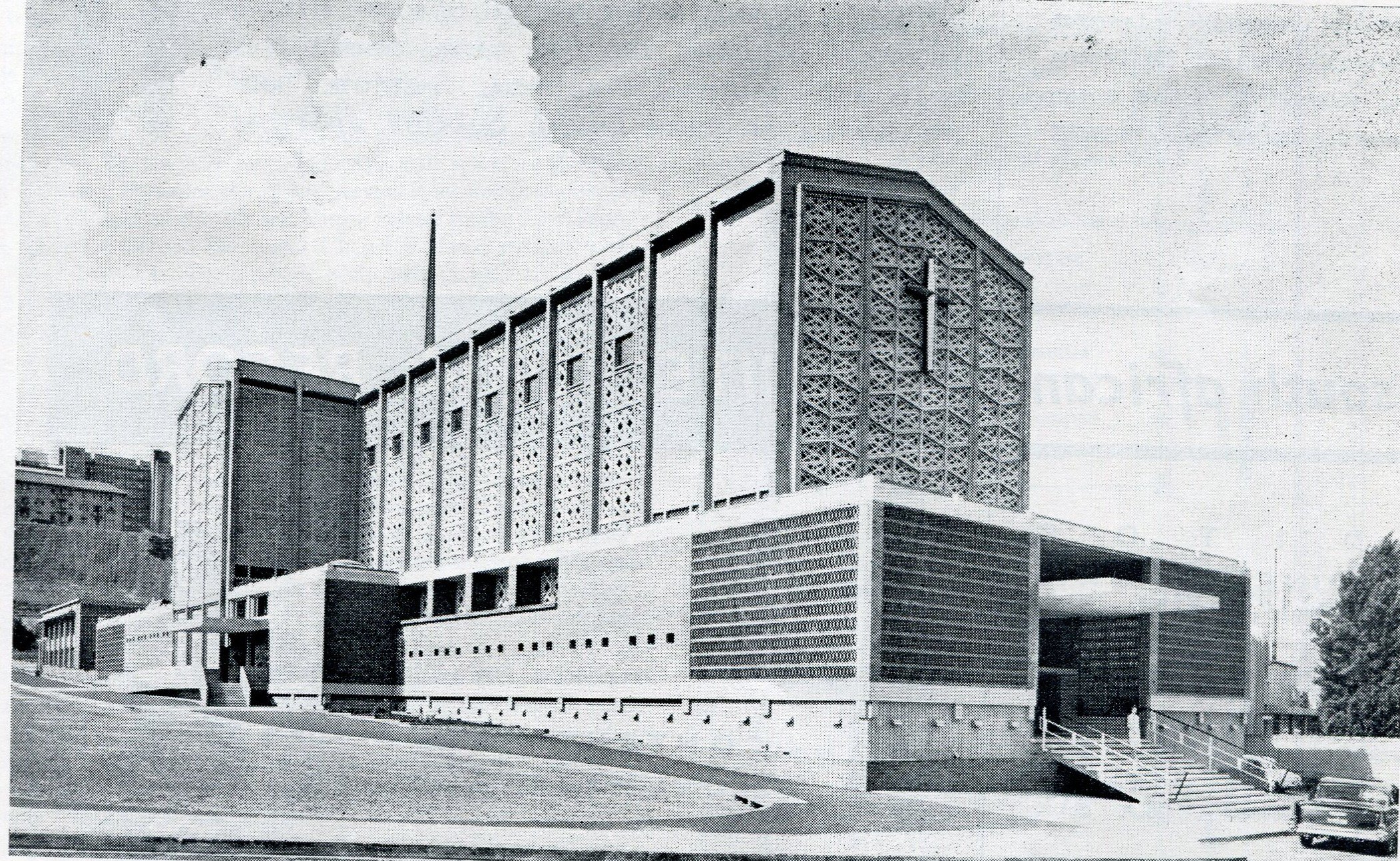
Exterior view

The Cathedral of Christ the King is a Catholic cathedral in Johannesburg, South Africa.

== History ==
The current cathedral was built in 1958 in Berea. The old cathedral on Kerk Street, built in 1896, had served the catholic community well, but with increasing numbers, it was decided to erect a new and larger cathedral. The plans to build the cathedral were envisioned in 1937 by David O'Leary, the first South African born Catholic Bishop of Johannesburg. O'Leary had originally intended the cathedral to be built on a site near Kerk Street but that land was partially sold and the remainder became the Kerk Street Church.

The cathedral plans were put on hold due to the outbreak of the Second World War and O'Leary died in 1950. In 1957 a site was bought on Saratoga Avenue by Bishop W. P. Whelan and funds were collected to lay the first stone in 1958. The Cathedral of Christ the King was designed by architect Brian Gregory from Belfast, Northern Ireland. The construction work was overseen by John P. Monahan and completed in 1958 by contractors John Burrow (Pty) Ltd of Johannesburg. The cathedral was consecrated and opened in 1960.

Whelan went on to be Archbishop of Bloemfontein and to cause some controversy when he failed to distance the South African Catholic church from apartheid in 1964.

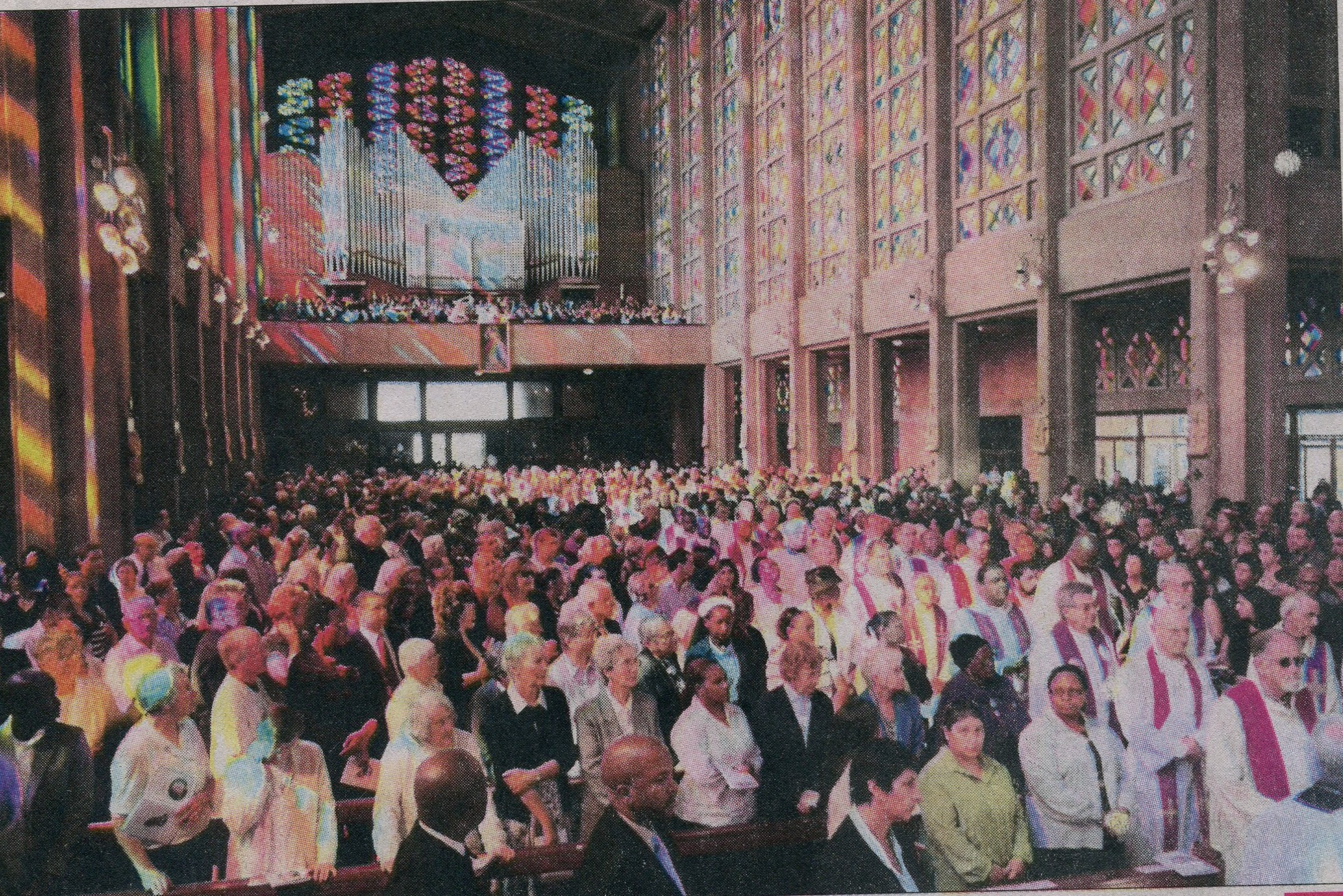
Interior view

The new cathedral now stands at the corner of End Street (once the limit, as its name implies, of the town's development) and Saratoga Avenue. This is a reasonably quiet situation, which, with the city's expansion, is now comparatively centrally located. The site was originally the location of Henry Nourse's House, which was recorded in property records for 1913 and 1925.

== Design ==
Modern in its detailing and construction, the cathedral has a traditional Latin cross form with a high nave – 65 feet (20 m), transepts, crossing and sanctuary. The nave is approximately 190 feet (58 m) long and has a vast capacity with seating for 1,500 people. A gallery seats a further 130 people. The side chapels are flat-roofed single storey spaces that wrap around the perimeter of the nave, along with the large meeting room and sacristies towards the End Street end of the building. The building rises 81 feet (25 m) from the pavement level on Saratoga Avenue, giving an impressive front facade.

Reconstituted stone panels with open lattice patterns form the framework for the geometric stained glass windows, and as with historic Cathedral design, the structure is divided into regular bays. Rather than traditional stone, the main structural frame is of reinforced concrete. The framework is infilled with face brick, except in the sanctuary where marble is used. The building finishes were left unpainted to reduce future maintenance liability and the flooring chosen was durable marble, terrazzo, mosaic and linoleum.

Liturgical foci – the altar, baptismal font and holy water fonts – are constructed in solid Botticino marble. The canopy over the high altar is constructed of edge-grained oregon pine with sapele mahogany fascias, in the form of a hyperbolic paraboloid supported on laminated sapele mahogany columns.

Two types of concrete were used: normal aggregate for hidden structural work, and a special red granite aggregate for exposed surfaces which were subsequently bush hammered. Portal roof frames at approximately 12-foot (3.7 m) intervals support precast purlins and 2 1/2-inch (64 mm) precast roof slabs, screeded with vermiculite and covered with copper sheeting on 2-inch (51 mm) felt insulation.

The cathedral was designed with accessibility to all in mind, with a shallow gradient ramp incorporated at the End Street entrance. A flight of steps leads up from Saratoga Avenue, where a projecting concrete slab provides a canopy overhead.

Stained glass windows transform the sunshine outside into patterns of blue, red, orange, yellow and green within the nave of the cathedral. The theme of each bay or picture windows was suggested by Bishop Boyle. All the stained glass work was carried out by Patrick Pollen of Dublin.

The subject matter of the windows is as follows:

- Gospel side – Christ Meets his Mother; Flight into Egypt; Nativity of Jesus; Immaculate Conception
- Epistle side – Christ the King; Feed my Sheep; Pentecost; Assumption of Mary
- Clerestory – Cross and Nails; Virgo Potens; Lamb of God; Rosa Mystica; Chi Rho and Crown; Fold of Sheep; Holy Ghost; Vas Honoris
- Nave high level, Gospel side – Winged man (symbol of Matthew the Evangelist); winged lion (symbol of Mark the Evangelist); Chi Rho in circle of Eternity; Wheat (bread); Anchor (faith); Pelican (Christ's church); The Trinity; Fish and Net (net of souls)
- Nave high level, Epistle side – winged ox or bull (symbol of Luke the Evangelist); eagle (symbol of John the Evangelist); Fish (ἰχθύς); Grapes (Wine); Ship; Chalice; Host; Alpha & Omega; Keys of St. Peter

The organ is one of the best instruments in the City of Johannesburg. The specification of the new organ of the Cathedral of Christ the King, has been drawn up by the present writer in consultation with the representatives of the firm of Cooper, Gill and Tomkins, Johannesburg, who have been awarded the contract to build the instrument. Incorporated in the new organ is the instrument formerly in the Pro-Cathedral of The Immaculate Conception, Kerk Street.

== Recent history ==
In September 1995 Pope John Paul II visited the cathedral as part of his visit to South Africa.

A memorial service for the late Pope John Paul II was held at the Cathedral of Christ the King on Wednesday 6 April 2005. The sermon was delivered by Buti Tlhagale, bishop of the Johannesburg Diocese, who hailed the Pope for his recognition of African cultures.

On 17 March 2009, the funeral of Father Lionel Sham took place at the Cathedral of Christ the King. Tragically murdered by two of his own congregation, the cathedral was full of family and friends celebrating the life of the much-loved priest.

About 4,500 people attended the service celebrated by Buti Tlhagale, archbishop of Johannesburg in thanksgiving for the new diocesan chancery building which was blessed the same day, in September 2012. The administrative centre for the archdiocese, the chancery was built at a cost of R30 million. Every parish in the diocese helped raise the funds needed for the project.

== Heritage status ==
The building is historically and culturally significant for the following reasons:

- The Cathedral of Christ the King is the head church of the Roman Catholic Archdiocese of Johannesburg
- Cathedral of Christ the King is constructed in high quality modern materials with distinctive reconstituted stone tracery detailing
- The Cathedral of Christ the King is a local landmark building and focal meeting point for the Roman Catholic community of Johannesburg
- Cathedral of Christ the King contains notable artworks, including the stained glass windows, marble liturgical foci carved from solid marble, a copy of the Pieta and other statues.
- Its association with the Right Revd David O’Leary, the first South African born Catholic Bishop of Johannesburg
