= Amos Mabuti Masemola =

South African Catholic prelate (born 1978)

Rt Reverend Amos Mabuti Masemola
- Bishop of Kroonstad, South Africa
- Church: Catholic Church
- Archdiocese: Roman Catholic Archdiocese of Bloemfontein
- See: Diocese of Kroonstad
- Appointed: 17 February 2026
- Installed: 16 May 2026
- Predecessor: Peter John Holiday
- Successor: Incumbent

Orders
- Ordination: 3 June 2007
- Consecration: 16 May 2026 by Dabula Anthony Mpako
- Rank: Bishop

Personal details
- Born: Amos Mabuti Masemola; 5 March 1978 (age 48) Winterveld, Archdiocese of Pretoria, Gauteng, South Africa

Styles of Amos Mabuti Masemola
- Reference style: Your Lordship; The Right Reverend
- Spoken style: His Lordship
- Religious style: Bishop

Amos Mabuti Masemola (born 5 March 1978) is a South African Catholic prelate who serves as the bishop of the Roman Catholic Diocese of Kroonstad, in South Africa. He was appointed on 17 February 2026 by Pope Leo XIV. Before that, from 3 June 2007 until 17 February 2026, he was a priest of the Roman Catholic Archdiocese of Pretoria. He was Vicar General of the Archdiocese of Pretoria upon his appointment as Bishop of Kroonstad. He was consecrated as Bishop of Kroonstad on 16 May 2026 by Archbishop Dabula Anthony Mpako of Pretoria.

== Background and education ==
He was born on 5 March 1978 in Winterveld, Archdiocese of Pretoria, Gauteng in South Africa. He studied both philosophy and theology at the Saint John Vianney Seminary in Pretoria. He also holds a master's degree in Christian spirituality, awarded by the Catholic University of Eastern Africa (CUEA) in Nairobi, Kenya.

== Priest ==
He was ordained a priest for the Catholic Archdiocese of Pretoria on 3 June 2007. He served as a priest until 17 February 2026. While a priest, he served in various capacities and locations including:

- Deputy parish priest of the pastoral district of Maboloka/Lethabile from 2007 until 2008.
- Parish priest of the pastoral district of Kwa Nhlanga from 2008 until 2011.
- Parish priest of Saint Vincent Parish in Phomolon from 2011 until 2016.
- Studies at the Catholic University of Eastern Africa (CUEA) in Nairobi, Kenya, leading to the award of a master's degree in Christian spirituality.
- Administrator of the Sacred Heart Cathedral in Pretoria from 2016 until 2020.
- Chancellor of the metropolitan archdiocese of Pretoria from 2016 until 2020.
- Member of the College of Consultors from 2016 until 2026.
- Spiritual director at the Saint John Vianney Seminary in Pretoria from 2017 until 2026.
- Lecturer at the Saint John Vianney Seminary in Pretoria from 2018 until 2026.
- Diocesan chancellor for the Sacred Heart Association from 2020 until 2026.
- Parish priest of Saint Thomas More in Centurion from 2021 until 2026.
- Vicar General and bursar of the metropolitan archdiocese of Pretoria from 2021 until 2026.

== Bishop ==
On 17 February 2026, Pope Leo XIV appointed him local ordinary of the Roman Catholic Diocese of Kroonstad. He succeeded Bishop Peter John Holiday who resigned on 12 December 2022, due to ill health. His episcopal consecration was held in Kroonstad on 16 May 2026. The Principal Consecrator was Dabula Anthony Mpako, Archbishop of Pretoria who was assisted by Zolile Peter Mpambani, Archbishop of Bloemfontein and Victor Hlolo Phalana, Bishop of Klerksdorp.

== See also ==
- Catholic Church in South Africa

== Succession table ==
Catholic Church titles
Preceded by Peter John Holiday (1 April 2011 - 12 December 2022)	Bishop of Kroonstad (since 17 February 2026)	Succeeded by (Incumbent)
