= Diocese of Bethlehem in South Africa =

Latin Catholic diocese in South Africa

Coordinates: 28.2333°S 28.3000°E

Diocese of Bethlehem Dioecesis Bethlehemensis

Location
- Country: South Africa
- Metropolitan: Archdiocese of Bloemfontein
- Headquarters: Bethlehem, Free State, South Africa

Statistics
- Area: 34,965 km^{2} (13,500 sq mi)
- Population: Total; Catholics: (as of 2023); 858,779; 59,916 (7.0%)
- Parishes: 14

Information
- Denomination: Catholic Church
- Sui iuris church: Latin Church
- Rite: Roman Rite
- Established: 12 February 1948; 78 years ago
- Cathedral: Cathedral of the Immaculate Heart of Mary in Bethlehem
- Patron saint: Immaculate Heart of Mary
- Secular priests: 23 (22 Diocesan, 1 Religious Orders)

Current leadership
- Pope: Leo XIV
- Bishop: Motlatsi Meshack Phomane
- Metropolitan Archbishop: Zolile Peter Mpambani, S.C.I.
- Bishops emeritus: Jan De Groef, M. Afr.

The Diocese of Bethlehem (Latin: Bethlehemen(sis)) is a Latin Catholic diocese located in the city of Bethlehem in the ecclesiastical province of Bloemfontein in South Africa.

== History ==
- 12 February 1948: the territory was established as the Apostolic Vicariate of Bethlehem from the Apostolic Vicariate of Kroonstad
- 11 January 1951: the Apostolic Vicariate was promoted and became the Diocese of Bethlehem

== Special churches ==
The Cathedral is the Cathedral of the Immaculate Heart of Mary in Bethlehem.

== Leadership ==
=== Apostolic Vicars of Bethlehem ===
- Léon Klerlein, C.S.Sp. (12 February 1948 – 9 December 1948), resigned
- Peter Kelleter, C.S.Sp. (12 March 1950 – 11 January 1951 see below)

=== Bishops of Bethlehem ===
- Peter Kelleter, C.S.Sp. (see above 11 January 1951 – 5 July 1975), resigned
- Hubert Bucher (9 December 1976 – 31 December 2008), retired
- Jan De Groef, M. Afr. (31 December 2008 – 14 April 2026), retired
- Motlatsi Meshack Phomane (14 April 2026 – Present)

=== Other priest of this diocese who became bishop ===
- Xolelo Thaddaeus Kumalo (1991-2008), appointed Bishop of Eshowe in 2008

== See also ==
- Catholic Church in South Africa
