= Diocese of Bloemfontein =

Diocese of Bloemfontein may refer to:

- the Anglican Diocese of the Free State, formerly the Diocese of Bloemfontein
- the Roman Catholic Archdiocese of Bloemfontein
