= Sylvester Anthony John David =

South African Catholic prelate (born 1953)

The Most Reverend Sylvester Anthony John David
- Auxiliary Bishop of Cape Town, South Africa
- Church: Catholic Church
- Archdiocese: Catholic Archdiocese of Cape Town
- See: Cape Town
- Appointed: 6 June 2019
- Installed: 25 August 2019

Orders
- Ordination: 8 February 1991 by Denis Eugene Hurley
- Consecration: 25 August 2019 by Stephen Brislin
- Rank: Bishop

Personal details
- Born: Sylvester Anthony John David; 15 August 1953 (age 73) Durban, Archdiocese of Durban, KwaZulu Natal, South Africa

Styles of Sylvester Anthony John David
- Reference style: Your Lordship; The Most Reverend
- Spoken style: His Lordship
- Religious style: Bishop

Sylvester Anthony John David O.M.I. (born 15 August 1953) is a South African Catholic prelate who serves as auxiliary bishop of the Roman Catholic Archdiocese of Cape Town, in the Republic of South Africa since 6 June 2019. He concurrently serves as Titular Bishop of Gunugus. He was appointed bishop by Pope Francis. Before that, from 8 February 1991 until 6 June 2019, he was a priest of the Catholic Archdiocese of Durban, South Africa. He was concentrated bishop at City Hall, Cape Town, by Stephen Brislin, Archbishop of Cape Town, on 25 August 2023. He is a professed member of the Missionary Oblates of Mary Immaculate religious order.

== Early life and education ==
Sylvester Anthony John David was born on 15 August 1953 in Durban, Archdiocese of Durban, KwaZulu Natal, in South Africa. He graduated with a Bachelor of Arts degree from the University of Durban-Westville. He went on to obtain a Bachelor of Arts in Counseling Psychology from the University of South Africa. From 1984 until 1990, he studied philosophy and theology at the Saint Joseph's Theological Institute in Cedara, KwaZulu Natal. He holds a Licentiate in Biblical Theology, awarded by the Pontifical Gregorian University in Rome, Italy, where he studied from 1999 until 2002.

== Priesthood ==
On 4 January 1984, he took his preliminary vows as a member of the Oblates of Mary Immaculate. He then took his perpetual vows of that Catholic Religious Order on 15 February 1988. He was ordained a priest for that Order on 8 February 1991. He served as a priest until 6 June 2019. While a priest, he served in various roles and locations, including:

- Parish Vicar and then Parish Priest of Saint Francis of Assisi Parish in Eastwood (Durban) from 1991 until 1994.
- Formator at the Cleland Pre-Novitiate from 1991 until 1994.
- Parish priest of Saint John's Parish in Estcourt (Durban) from 1994 until 1996.
- Parish priest of Saint Joseph's Parish in Cedara (Durban) from 1996 until 1999.
- Formator at Saint Joseph's Scholasticate from 1996 until 1999.
- Studies in Rome at the Pontifical Gregorian University, leading to the award of a licentiate in Biblical Theology, from 1999 until 2002.
- Parish priest of Saint Louis' Parish in Clairwood and Saint Mary's Parish in Merebank (Durban) from 2002 until 2004.
- Formator at the Cebula House of Formation (Prenovitiate) from 2005 until 2007.
- Professor at the Saint Joseph's Theological Institute from 2005 until 2007.
- President of Saint Joseph's Theological Institute from 2007 until 2015.
- Sabbatical year from 2015 until 2016.
- Parish priest of the Blessed Sacrament Parish in 2016.
- Professor at Saint Joseph's Theological Institute in 2016.
- Vicar General of the Archdiocese of Durban from 2017 until 2019.

== As bishop ==
On 6 June 2019, Pope Francis appointed Reverend Father Sylvester Anthony John David to be the Auxiliary Bishop of the Archdiocese of Cape Town.

He was consecrated at Cape Town on 25 August 2019 by the hands of Stephen Brislin, Archbishop of Cape Town, assisted by Cardinal Wilfrid Fox Napier, Archbishop of Durban, and Jabulani Adatus Nxumalo, Archbishop of Bloemfontein. As of 2023 continues to serve in that capacity.

== See also ==
- Catholic Church in South Africa

== Succession table ==
Catholic Church titles
Preceded by	Auxiliary Bishop of Cape Town (since 6 June 2019)	Succeeded by
