= Siphiwo Devilliers Paul Vanqa =

South African Catholic prelate (born 1955)

The Most Reverend Siphiwo Devilliers Paul Vanqa
- Bishop of Queenstown, South Africa
- Church: Catholic Church
- Archdiocese: Catholic Archdiocese of Cape Town
- See: Diocese of Queenstown
- Appointed: 3 March 2021
- Installed: 29 May 2021
- Predecessor: Dabula Anthony Mpako
- Successor: Incumbent
- Other post: Administrator of Queenstown (2019 -2021)

Orders
- Ordination: 5 July 1986
- Consecration: 29 May 2021 by Stephen Brislin
- Rank: Bishop

Personal details
- Born: Siphiwo Devilliers Paul Vanqa; 15 June 1955 (age 70) Xonxa, Diocese of Queenstown, Eastern Cape, South Africa
- Motto: "That They May Be One"

Styles of Siphiwo Devilliers Paul Vanqa
- Reference style: Your Lordship; The Most Reverend
- Spoken style: His Lordship
- Religious style: Bishop

Siphiwo Devilliers Paul Vanqa S.A.C. (born 15 June 1955) is a South African Catholic prelate who serves as the Bishop of the Roman Catholic Diocese of Queenstown, in the Republic of South Africa since 3 March 2021. He was appointed bishop by Pope Francis. Before that, from 5 July 1986 until 3 March 2021, he was a priest of the religious order of the Society of the Catholic Apostolate (Pallottines). He was concentrated bishop in Queenstown, by Stephen Brislin, Archbishop of Cape Town, on 29 May 2021. He is a professed member of the Pallotines Catholic religious order.

== Background and education ==
He was born on 15 June 1955 in Xonxa, Diocese of Queenstown, Eastern Cape, South Africa. He joined the Society of the Catholic Apostolate (Pallottines) in 1979. He completed his novitiate in Germany. While there, he took his preliminary vows as a member of that Catholic religious order on 11 October 1982. He studied at the Saint Joseph's Theological Institute, in Cedara, KwaZulu Natal, South Africa, which is an affiliate of the Pontifical Urban University, in Rome, Italy. He took his perpetual vows for his religious society on 6 October 1985.

== Priesthood ==
On 5 July 1986, he was ordained a priest for his religious order, the Pallottines. He served as a priest until 3 March 2021. While a priest, he served in various roles and locations, including:

- Parish vicar of the Holy Family Parish in Dutywa, Eastern Cape, from 1986 until 1988.
- Parish priest of Saint Thomas More Parish in Tsomo, Eastern Cape, from 1988 until 1992.
- Parish priest of Our Lady Queen of Apostles Parish at the Pallottines Farm, in Queenstown from 1993 until 1995.
- Formator at the Saint Vincent Pallotti House in Merrivale and Pietermaritzburg from 1995 until 2010.
- Parish priest of Imbali Parish in the Catholic Archdiocese of Durban from 1995 until 2010.
- Parish priest of Saint Mary's Parish and Saint Joseph's Parish in Stutterheim from 2011 until 2015.
- Administrator of the Christ the King Cathedral, Queenstown from 2015 until 2021.
- Vicar General of the Catholic Diocese of Queenstown from 2011 until 2019.
- Diocesan administrator of the Catholic Diocese of Queenstown from 2019 until 2021.

== As bishop ==
On 3 March 2021, Pope Francis appointed Reverend Father Siphiwo Devilliers Paul Vanqa, previously diocesan administrator of Queenstown Diocese as the new bishop of that Catholic See. He was consecrated and installed at Queenstown on 29 May 2021 by the hands of Stephen Brislin, Archbishop of Cape Town assisted by Dabula Anthony Mpako, Archbishop of Pretoria and Zolile Peter Mpambani, Archbishop of Bloemfontein. He continues to serve in that role.

== See also ==
- Catholic Church in South Africa

== Succession table ==
Catholic Church titles
Preceded by Dabula Anthony Mpako (23 May 2011 - 30 April 2019)	Bishop of Queenstown (since 3 March 2021)	Succeeded by Incumbent
