= Bishop of Johannesburg =

Bishop of Johannesburg may refer to:

- the Bishop of Johannesburg in the Anglican Church; see Anglican Diocese of Johannesburg
- the Archbishop of Johannesburg in the Roman Catholic Church; see Roman Catholic Archdiocese of Johannesburg
