= Diocese of Johannesburg =

Diocese of Johannesburg may refer to:

- the Anglican Diocese of Johannesburg
- the Roman Catholic Archdiocese of Johannesburg
