= Sacred Heart Cathedral, Bloemfontein =

Coordinates: 29.1216°S 26.2169°E

Sacred Heart Cathedral
- Sacred Heart Cathedral
- Location: Bloemfontein
- Country: South Africa
- Denomination: Roman Catholic Church

The Sacred Heart Cathedral is a religious building that is affiliated with the Catholic Church and is located at 1 Green in the city of Bloemfontein in the Free State province, South Africa.

It serves as the main church and seat of the Catholic Archdiocese of Bloemfontein (Archidioecesis Bloemfonteinensis) which was created in 1951 with the bull Suprema Nobis of Pope Pius XII and depends on the ecclesiastical province of the same name. Its metropolitan archbishop since 2020 is Zolile Peter Mpambani.

== See also ==
- Roman Catholicism in South Africa
- Sacred Heart Cathedral (disambiguation)
