= Benedict Daswa =

Catholic martyr (b. 1946, d. 1990)

Blessed Benedict Daswa

Martyr
- Born: 16 June 1946; Mbahe, Limpopo, South Africa
- Died: 2 February 1990 (aged 43); Mbahe, Limpopo, South Africa
- Venerated in: Roman Catholic Church
- Beatified: 13 September 2015, Limpopo, South Africa by Cardinal Angelo Amato
- Feast: 1 February

Benedict Daswa (born Tshimangadzo Samuel Daswa; 16 June 1946 – 2 February 1990), was a South African school teacher and principal. He was given the name of "Samuel" by his parents when he started to attend school and assumed the name "Benedict" upon his conversion to Catholicism. A local mob murdered him after he refused to pay support for anti–Christian superstition.

His martyrdom was confirmed by the Catholic Church in 2015, paving the way for his beatification. He was beatified in Limpopo on 13 September 2015. Cardinal Angelo Amato – on behalf of Pope Francis – presided over the beatification Mass.

== Biography ==
Benedict Daswa was born as Tshimangadzo Samuel Daswa on 16 June 1946 in South Africa and was a member of the Lemba people. He was the first child born to Tshililo Petrus Daswa (Bakali) and Thidziambi Ida Daswa (Gundula). This tribe followed Jewish rituals and laws. Daswa had three younger brothers and one sister: Thanyani Mackson, Muvhulawa Calson, Thinavhuyo Mavis and Humbulani Innocent. Daswa worked as a herd boy before he attended school which started at Vondwe Primary School in 1957 which was followed by secondary school at Mphaphuli High School. After his father's accidental death, it fell to him to provide for his siblings and did so by paying for their education while in the workforce. He constantly encouraged them to take pride in their studies.

Daswa was exposed to Roman Catholicism through a friend he met while in Johannesburg while living with an uncle there. He learnt about the Catholic faith and learnt catechism every Sunday from Benedict Risimati. After two years of instruction, Daswa was baptized on 21 April 1963 by the priest Augustine O'Brien. He took the name of "Benedict" due to the fact that he was inspired by Benedict of Nursia, also selecting as his life motto "Ora et labora" (pray and work). He was confirmed by Abbot Bishop F. Clemens van Hoek three months later on 21 July 1963.

He became an active member of the Catholic Church in South Africa. Daswa went to Venda Teacher Training College to do a primary teacher's certificate and later obtained his matriculation through correspondence in 1973. He served as a teacher and catechist as he worked with adolescents and he assisted families that endured economic hardship. Daswa was a highly respected individual in his local community and became known for his honesty, truthfulness and integrity, even known to fetch students who decided to skip schools. Daswa later helped to build the first church in his area and later became the principal of the school that he taught at on 1 January 1979 at Nweli Primary School. He once convinced a father who wanted to marry off his daughter to an older man to allow the girl to complete her education.

Daswa married Shadi Eveline Monyai (d. 2008) in 1974 and the pair had a total of eight children, including Lufuno (b. 1977) who was the eldest, Benedicta (b. 1990), Helen and Faith. He would help his wife with household chores, unheard of at that time in his area, and he valued his family to the point of hosting Daswa Family Days each 16 December where gifts would be exchanged and a meal held. For his family, he personally built his brick house. Daswa also established a soccer team called the Mbahe Eleven Computers and left this team when members wanted to use "muti" (medicine) in order to win games. He started a new team, Mbahe Freedom Rebels. He was an active member of his community, serving as the secretary of the local traditional council; the local chief valued his counsel.

In November 1989, heavy rains and lightning strikes plagued the area. When his village suffered strong storms again in January 1990, the elders decided that the lightning occurred due to magic and thus demanded a tax from all their residents to pay for a sangoma to "sniff out" the witch who caused the storms, who they would then burn. Daswa said they were just a natural phenomenon and declined to pay the tax; he stated that his Catholic faith prevented him "from taking part in anything connected with witchcraft."

On 2 February 1990, Daswa drove his sister-in-law and her sick child to a doctor in Thohoyandou and en route, picked up a man who asked for his help to take a bag of mealie meal to his home in a town next to Mbahe. At around 7:30pm, he returned to Mbahe where he left his sister-in-law and child near their home. He told his daughter that he would soon return after taking the passenger to the next village.

Returning home, found his path blocked by fallen trees and as he attempted to clear the road he was ambushed by a mob of young men. Bleeding as a result of stoning, he left his damaged car and ran for assistance at a woman's hut. However, the woman revealed where he was when the mob threatened to kill her if she did not comply. As a result of this, he was beaten and clubbed over the head. Boiling water was poured over him in his ears and nostrils after he was attacked to ensure that he was dead. His final words were, "God, into Your hands receive my spirit". The woman of the hut informed Daswa's brother what had happened and the latter remained with his dead brother for the night.

=== Post-mortem ===
The funeral took place on Saturday, 10 February 1990. The funeral procession commenced at Daswa's home and then proceeded to Nweli Church. Celebrants wore red vestments to indicate their belief that Daswa died at the hands of his attackers in hatred of his faith.

Daswa's mother later converted to Roman Catholicism and saved her pension to purchase a tombstone for her murdered son. This was unveiled after a special Mass on 26 November 2000. Daswa's remains were later transferred to Nweli Church on 24 August 2015.

== Beatification ==
The cause of beatification commenced on 10 June 2008 on a diocesan level in Tzaneen which concluded in 2009 with the commencement of the "Roman Phase". Pope Francis approved a decree that recognized his martyrdom on 22 January 2015. The beatification was celebrated by Cardinal Angelo Amato in Limpopo on 13 September 2015; the beatification date was confirmed in March 2015. Present at the celebration was Daswa's mother and children as well as Augustine O'Brien who baptized him. Approximately 30,000 people attended the beatification.

== Veneration ==
On the 1st of February 2020 thousands of the people gathered at the Benedict Daswa Shrine Site in Tshitanini to witness the 30th anniversary celebration of the martyrdom of Blessed Benedict Daswa. Cardinal Wilfrid Napier was the main celebrant, assisted by Bishop Joao Rodrigues and Bishop Emeritus Hugh Slattery of Tzaneen Diocese. Napier based his homily on the gospel of the day: "unless a grain of wheat falls to the ground and dies it remains itself alone, but it if dies it produces many more seeds like itself".

=== Relics ===
Daswa's remains were exhumed from his grave on 24 August 2015 in the presence of the police, a nurse and a doctor. The exhumation took more than four hours due to the secure burial with several layers of thick cement between layers of soil; the steel coffin was reported to be in good condition. At the behest of the family, his remains were taken to the grave of his wife and the coffin opened to reveal Daswa's skeletal remains intact. The family desired the remains to be left undisturbed in the original coffin for reinterment, which was cleaned and covered in white material and colored traditional Venda cloth. A document to testify to the exhumation was placed in the coffin. His remains were relocated to a grave in a church in Mbahe and a toe and a piece of the garment he was wearing was removed and was sent away to be used as relics.

Medal

Daswa's Medal was created in South Africa in 2015 by Immaculate Heart Catholic Supply, which has his face on the front and the Knob-Kierrie and stones at the back with "Pray for us" these items symbolize his Martydom. The devotional medal was the very first created in South Africa by a South African Catholic company. The Medal can be found and bought by the Cause of Canonization, Radio Veritas, Immaculate Heart Catholic Supply or your nearest Catholic Church who has them available.
