= Jabulani Adatus Nxumalo =

South African Catholic prelate (born 1944

The Most Reverend Jabulani Adatus Nxumalo, O.M.I.
- Archbishop Emeritus of Bloemfontein, South Africa
- Church: Catholic Church
- Archdiocese: Roman Catholic Archdiocese of Bloemfontein
- See: Bloemfontein
- Appointed: 10 October 2005
- Installed: 10 October 2005
- Term ended: 1 April 2020
- Predecessor: Buti Joseph Tlhagale
- Successor: Zolile Peter Mpambani
- Other post: Auxiliary Bishop of Durban (8 July 2002 - 10 October 2005)

Orders
- Ordination: 2 September 1974
- Consecration: 25 August 2002 by Cardinal Wilfrid Fox Napier
- Rank: Archbishop

Personal details
- Born: Jabulani Adatus Nxumalo; 27 January 1944 (age 82) Durban, Archdiocese of Durban, Kwazulu Natal, South Africa

Styles of Jabulani Adatus Nxumalo
- Reference style: Your Lordship; The Most Reverend
- Spoken style: His Lordship
- Religious style: Bishop

Jabulani Adatus Nxumalo O.M.I. (born 27 January 1944) is a South African Catholic prelate who served as the archbishop of the Roman Catholic Archdiocese of Bloemfontein, in South Africa. He was appointed to that position on 10 October 2005. His age-related retirement took effect on 1 April 2020. Before that, from 8 July 2002 until 10 October 2005, he was auxiliary bishop of the Archdiocese of Durban in South Africa. He was appointed bishop on 8 July 2002 by Pope John Paul II. He concurrently served as Titular Bishop of Ficus while auxiliary bishop. He was consecrated at Durban on 25 August 2002 by Wilfrid Fox Napier, Archbishop of Durban. On 10 October 2005, Pope Benedict XVI transferred him to the Archdiocese of Bloemfontein and appointed him Archbishop over that Ecclesiastical Metropolitan Province. On 1 April 2020, he retired at the age of 76. He is a professed member of the Oblates of Mary Immaculate.

== Background and education ==
He was born on 27 January 1944, in Durban, Archdiocese of Durban, Kwazulu Natal, in South Africa. He took his vows as a member of the Oblates of Mary Immaculate in 1966. He holds a licentiate in Missiology, awarded by an institution in Rome, Italy.

== Priest ==
He was ordained a priest for the Oblates of Mary Immaculate on 2 September 1974. He served as a priest until 8 July 2002. While a priest, "he served as Dean of Studies, lecturer and formator at the Saint Joseph's Scholasticate". During this time Reverend Father Zolile Peter Mpambani (later Bishop Zolile Peter Mpambani) was a student at the institution. He served as a member of the Theological Advisory Commission of the Southern African Catholic Bishops Conference from 1978 until 1984. He was also a member of the Missiological Society of Southern Africa. In addition, he sat on the editorial board of Missionalia Missiological Review. He served as provincial administrator in Kwazulu Natal, South Africa for his Catholic religious Order for a period of six months in 1998. During the 33rd Oblate General Chapter, he was elected General Councilor for the Africa-Madagascar Region.

== Bishop ==
On 8 July 2002, Pope John Paul II appointed Reverend Father Jabulani Adatus Nxumalo previously a member of the clergy of the Archdiocese of Durban, as auxiliary bishop of Durban. He was assigned Titular Bishop of Ficus. He was consecrated at Durban on 25 August 2002 by Cardinal Wilfrid Fox Napier, Archbishop of Durban assisted by George Francis Daniel, Archbishop of Pretoria and Paul Mandla Khumalo, Bishop of Witbank. On 10 October 2005, Pope Benedict XVI elevated him to be the Archbishop of Bloemfontein. While bishop, he served as the representative of the Southern African Catholic Bishops Conference to the International Commission on Liturgy.

On 1 April 2020, Pope Francis accepted the age-related resignation of Archbishop Nxumalo from the pastoral administration of the Ecclesiastical Metropolitan Province of Bloemfontein. That same day, The Holy Father appointed Bishop Zolile Peter Mpambani, previously of the Roman Catholic Diocese of Kokstad to succeed at Bloemfontein.

As of January 2026, he lives on as Archbishop Emeritus of Bloemfontein, South Africa.

== See also ==
- Catholic Church in South Africa

== Succession table ==
Catholic Church titles
Preceded by Buti Joseph Tlhagale (2 January 1999 - 8 April 2003)	Archbishop of Bloemfontein (10 October 2005 - 1 April 2020	Succeeded by Zolile Peter Mpambani (since 1 April 2020)
Preceded by	Auxiliary Bishop of Durban (8 July 2002 - 10 October 2005)	Succeeded by
