= Johannes Ludgerus Bonaventure Brenninkmeijer =

- O.P.
- Church: Catholic Church
- Diocese: Diocese of Kroonstad
- In office: 15 April 1977 – 2 July 2003
- Predecessor: Gerard Marie Franciscus van Velsen
- Successor: Stephen Brislin

Orders
- Ordination: 25 July 1957
- Consecration: 24 July 1977 by Alfonso Liguori Morapeli

Personal details
- Born: 19 July 1930 Amsterdam, Netherlands
- Died: 2 July 2003 (aged 72) Kroonstad, Free State, South Africa

Johannes Ludgerus Bonaventure Brenninkmeijer (born 19 July 1930 in Amsterdam – 2 July 2003) was a Dutch clergyman and bishop for the Roman Catholic Diocese of Kroonstad. He became ordained in 1957. He was appointed bishop in 1977. He died on 2 July 2003 in Kroonstad, at the age of 72.
