= Stephen Brislin =

South African cardinal archbishop of Cape Town (born 1956)

His Eminence Stephen Brislin
- Cardinal, Archbishop of Johannesburg
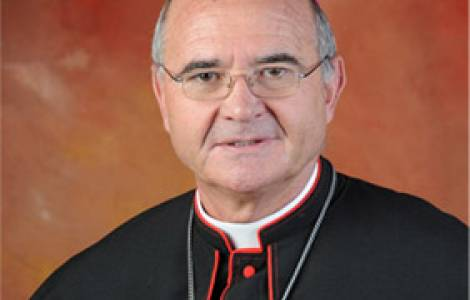
- Church: Roman Catholic Church
- Archdiocese: Johannesburg
- See: Johannesburg
- Appointed: 28 October 2024
- Installed: 25 January 2025
- Predecessor: Buti Joseph Tlhagale
- Other post: Cardinal Priest of Santa Maria Domenica Mazzarello (2023–present)
- Previous posts: Bishop of Kroonstad (2006-09); President of the Inter-Regional Meeting of Bishops of Southern Africa (2012-16); President of the Southern African Catholic Bishops Conference (2013-19); Archbishop of Cape Town (2010-24)

Orders
- Ordination: 19 November 1983
- Consecration: 28 January 2007 by Jabulani Adatus Nxumalo
- Created cardinal: 30 September 2023 by Pope Francis
- Rank: Cardinal Priest (2023-)

Personal details
- Born: Stephen Brislin; 24 September 1956 (age 70) Welkom, Orange Free State, Union of South Africa
- Denomination: Roman Catholic
- Motto: Veritas in Caritate ("truth in love")
- Signature: Stephen Brislin's signature

- Coat of arms: Stephen Brislin's coat of arms

Ordination history of Stephen Brislin
History
Diaconal ordination
- Ordained by: J.L. Brenninkmeijer
Priestly ordination
- Ordained by: J.L. Brenninkmeijer
Episcopal consecration
- Principal consecrator: Jabulani Adatus Nxumalo
- Co-consecrators: Hubert Bucher; Zithulele Patrick Mvemve
Cardinalate
- Elevated by: Pope Francis
Episcopal succession
Bishops consecrated by Stephen Brislin as principal consecrator
- Francisco Fortunato de Gouveia: 17 July 2010
- Vincent Mduduzi Zungu: 28 June 2014
- Sylvester Anthony John David: 25 August 2019
- Joseph Mary Kizito: 15 February 2020
- Noel Andrew Rucastle: 8 August 2020
- Siphiwo Devilliers Paul Vanqa: 29 May 2021

Styles of Stephen Brislin
- Reference style: His Eminence
- Spoken style: Your Eminence
- Religious style: Cardinal
- Informal style: Cardinal
- See: Johannesburg

Stephen Brislin (born 24 September 1956) is a South African Catholic prelate who has served as Archbishop of Johannesburg since 2025. He was previously Archbishop of Cape Town from 2010 to 2024. He was made a cardinal by Pope Francis in 2023.

== Biography ==
Stephen Brislin was born on 24 September 1956 in Welkom. He is of Scottish and Irish descent. He attended primary and secondary school there at the Convent of Saint Agnes and the Christian Brothers schools. He studied psychology at the University of Cape Town. He studied philosophy at St. John Vianney Seminary in Pretoria and theology at the Missionary Institute of Mill Hill in London. He earned a bachelor's degree from the University of Louvain. He was ordained a priest on 19 November 1983 for the Diocese of Kroonstad, South Africa.

Pope Benedict XVI appointed him as Bishop of Kroonstad on 17 October 2006. He received his episcopal consecration on 28 January 2007 from Jabulani Adatus Nxumalo, O.M.I., Archbishop of Bloemfontein.

Pope Benedict named Brislin Archbishop of Cape Town on 18 December 2009. He was installed on 7 February 2010 at the Bellville Velodrome.

He was president of the Southern African Catholic Bishops' Conference from 2013 to 2019. As conference president, he participated in the October 2014 Synod on the Family, where he was elected relator of one of its ten working groups, where his work was praised. He participated in the September 2015 session as well.

In January 2018, Brislin visited the Gaza Strip as part of the annual Holy Land Coordination, an international effort of bishops in support of peace and communication.

On 9 July 2023, Pope Francis announced that he planned to make him a cardinal at a consistory scheduled for 30 September. At that consistory he was made cardinal priest of Santa Maria Domenica Mazzarello.

On 4 October 2023, Pope Francis appointed Brislin a member of the Dicastery for the Causes of Saints.

On 28 October 2024, Pope Francis appointed Brislin to serve as Cardinal Archbishop of the Archdiocese of Johannesburg, succeeding Archbishop-Emeritus Buti Joseph Tlhagale.

Brislin is the Grand Prior of the Southern Africa Magistral Delegation of the Equestrian Order of the Holy Sepulchre of Jerusalem. The Magistral Delegation was established in 2010.

Brislin participated as a cardinal elector in the 2025 papal conclave that elected Pope Leo XIV.

== Views ==
Brislin has taken a welcoming approach to homosexual people in the Church, stating in a 2017 interview that the Church "should be home for gay people", and some homosexuals in parishes are "very good Catholics" trying to live good lives. He supports Pope Francis' 2023 declaration Fiducia supplicans, which allows Catholic priests to bless unmarried and same-sex couples, noting that the declaration does not condone homosexuality.

In 2014, while Archbishop, Brislin reaffirmed the Church's stance on female ordination, stating that "It is...contrary to the spirit of the Catholic Church to be involved in the promotion of the ordination of women to the priestly ministry." However, Brislin appears to have softened his stance since, and in the 2022 archdiocesan synthesis report stated "We need to promote the dignity of women and explore, at the very least, the possibility of the female diaconate."

Brislin has spoken out in favor of efforts to reduce global warming, expressing that "Climate change is a threat that we all face and we all should be working together to mitigate it.”

== Coat of Arms ==
Coat of Arms of Bishop Stephen Brislin (2007-2009)

Coat of Arms of Archbishop Stephen Brislin (2009-2023)

Coat of Arms of Stephen Cardinal Brislin (2023–present)

=== Arms as a Bishop ===
The Arms of Bishop Brislin are hard to blazon accurately. The charges chosen recall aspects of the Bishops personal history. For example his origins are recalled in the thistle and shamrock, evoking Scotland and Ireland, from where his parents hailed. The 'crown of Kroonstad' is the Basotho hat and it is in honour point representing the Basotho people he ministered to most during his priesthood. The chief charge however is the cross, which is empty signifying the importance of Christ's resurrection and it is rooted in a verdant pasture showing how life flows from the Cross. This life is in contrast to the barren and arid brown skyline that represents the lifelessness that awaits those away from the hope that the Cross provides. Behind the Cross, and illuminating it, is the rising sun, symbolising the Resurrection and the promise of eternal life. The people approaching the Cross are also near the fruit that flows to those who root themselves in the Cross. The Acacia tree, maize and wheat are the common signs of life and fruit of labour in the Free State.

=== Arms as an Archbishop ===
On his appointment as archbishop and move from Kroonstad to Cape Town, there were not many changes in the Arms, aside from the predictable increase in the number of tassels, representing the change in rank from Bishop to Archbishop. Archbishop Brislin did however introduce an additional charge in his Arms when he arrived in Cape Town, namely including a bunch of Grapes that he placed in the center base of the shield. This addition represents the fruitfulness of the Western Cape - a well-known and popular location for vineyards - and deepens the allusion in his previous Arms. The vineyard is mentioned in the Bible and the grapes, the fruit of the vine, also recall the words in the Liturgy of the Eucharist at the time of the preparation of the gifts, thus completing and deepening the earlier allusion of the fruitfulness of Christ by linking it to His Body and Blood in the Eucharist.

=== Arms as a Cardinal ===
On being appointed to the College of Cardinals, Archbishop Brislin prepared a new Coat of Arms that are more heraldically correct. They can be blazoned as: "Gules a pall and endorse argent; in dexter flank a mullet of 5 points, and in sinister flank an anchor, both argent, and in honour point a Basotho hat (mokorotlo) Gules."

The red of the shield (along with the galero and tassels proper to Cardinals) recalls the Cardinals' duty to shed blood in defense of the Catholic faith. The Cross, so prominent in his earlier Arms is still present in his new Arms for those with 'eyes to see', through the use of a Pall, that whilst recalling the pallium of a Metropolitan Archbishop, also resembles the upraised shape of a Cross that welcomes all and symbolises salvation. The cross is also present in the choice of one of the other charges, namely the mullet on the dexter side. This five-pointed star recalls the five points of the astronomical constellation Crux, popularly known as the Southern Cross which marks the location of the Archbishop's Archdiocse in the Southern Hemisphere.

The charges also reflect one of Pope Francis's pastoral priorities: the situation of migrants, refugees, and other displaced people. Cape Town, home to the Cape of Good Hope, is represented by an anchor, symbolizing both hope and the city's maritime heritage. It also represents the many seafarers and other maritime workers who arrive in Cape Town and are served by the Church and the Archdiocese.

Alongside the anchor, is the star, which recalls the archdiocese's Patroness, Our Lady Flight into Egypt, as well as bearing allusions to Our Lady, Star of the Sea. Whilst the latter links itself to the naval allusions of the Anchor, the former speaks to the fact that even the Holy Family had experiences of being a refugee as they sought refuge in a foreign land.

The third charge also links to the theme of migrants, as the people to whom the Cardinal ministered to in his early priesthood and time as bishop were the Basotho, who were migrants in Kroonstad from Lesotho. The Basotho hat is in honour point representing the concern that the Cardinal has in never forgetting his roots and where he came from in Welkom - a town that in English translation means 'Welcome' and is the attitude of hospitality Catholicism, and in particular Pope Francis, has called the Church to embody, welcoming the stranger.

The other elements of the coat of arms are the standard signs of rank of a metropolitan archbishop and a cardinal. The archiepiscopal cross also has five red marks, that could be interpreted as referring again to the Cross through the five wounds of Christ borne on that Cross.

The Cardinal’s motto “Veritas in Caritate” (Truth in Charity) taken from Ephesians 4:15, is also a homage to Pope Benedict XVI who originally appointed him to the episcopate and whose third Encyclical bears a similar name "Caritas in Veritate", and has remained a constant in his Arms since 2007.

The practice of including a Metropolitan's Pallium underneath the Arms is another sign of following the traditional practice of ecclesiastic heraldry.

== Honours ==
Brislin was awarded an Honorary Doctorate of Pastoral Leadership by the Oblate School of Theology, San Antonio, Texas, USA, on 5 May 2023.

== Appointments ==
Arms	Appointment	From	Until	Duration
	Priest of Kroonstad (South Africa)	19 November 1983; 43 years ago	17 October 2006; 20 years ago	22 years, 10 months and 28 days
	Prelate of Honour of His Holiness	2 August 2002; 24 years ago	17 October 2006; 20 years ago	4 years, 2 months and 15 days
	Bishop of Kroonstad (South Africa)	17 October 2006; 20 years ago	18 December 2009; 16 years ago	3 years, 2 months and 1 day
	Archbishop of Cape Town (South Africa)	18 December 2009; 16 years ago	30 September 2023; 3 years ago	13 years, 9 months and 12 days
	President of the Inter-Regional Meeting of Bishops of Southern Africa (IMBISA)	August 2012; 14 years ago	November 2016; 10 years ago	4 years and 2 or 3 months
	President of the Southern African Catholic Bishops Conference (SACBC)	February 2013; 13 years ago	February 2019; 7 years ago	5 or 6 years
	Cardinal Priest of Santa Maria Domenica Mazzarello	30 September 2023; 3 years ago	present	3 years, 1 month and 23 days
	Cardinal Archbishop of Cape Town (South Africa)	30 September 2023; 3 years ago	28 October 2024; 2 years ago	1 year and 28 days
	Member of the Dicastery for the Causes of Saints	4 October 2023; 3 years ago	present	3 years, 1 month and 18 days
	Member of the Dicastery for the Clergy	28 August 2025; 14 months ago	present	1 year, 2 months and 25 days
	Cardinal Archbishop of Johannesburg (South Africa)	28 October 2024; 2 years ago	present	2 years and 25 days

Catholic Church titles
Preceded by George Pell	Cardinal Priest of Santa Maria Domenica Mazzarello; 2023-present	Incumbent
Preceded by Buti Joseph Tlhagale	President of the Southern African Catholic Bishops Conference (SACBC); 2013-2019	Succeeded by Sithembele Anton Sipuka
Preceded by Gabriel Mbiling	President of the Inter-Regional Meeting of Bishops of Southern Africa (IMBISA); 2012-2016	Succeeded by Lucio Andrice Muandula
Preceded by Lawrence Patrick Henry	Archbishop of Cape Town; 2009-2024	Succeeded by Sithembele Anton Sipuka
Preceded by Johannes Ludgerus Bonaventure Brenninkmeijer	Bishop of Kroonstad; 2006–2009	Succeeded by Peter John Holiday
Preceded by Buti Joseph Tlhagale	Archbishop of Johannesburg; 2024-present	Incumbent

== See also ==
- Cardinals created by Francis
