= Archdiocese of Johannesburg =

Latin Catholic archdiocese in South Africa

Coordinates: 26°12′S 28°02′E

Archdiocese of Johannesburg Archidioecesis Ioannesburgensis
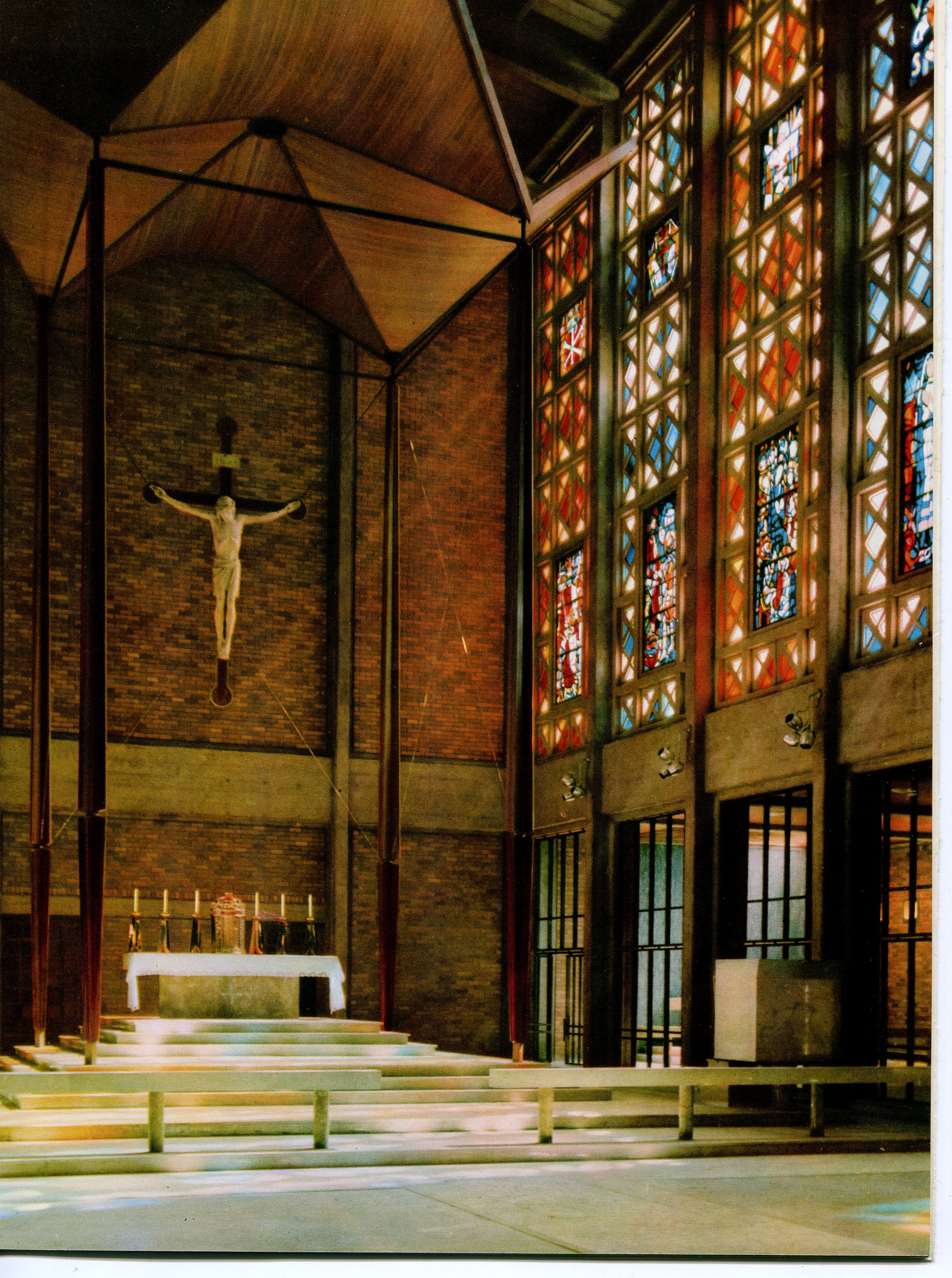
- Cathedral of Christ the King

- Coat of arms of the Archdiocese

Location
- Country: South Africa
- Episcopal conference: Southern African Catholic Bishops' Conference
- Ecclesiastical province: Johannesburg
- Deaneries: Central, East, Far East, West, North, South, Soweto, Vaal
- Headquarters: 186 Nugget Street, Berea, Johannesburg, 2198, Republic of South Africa
- Coordinates: -26.1933485, 28.0507909

Statistics
- Area: 14,517 km^{2} (5,605 sq mi)
- Population: Total; Catholics: (as of 2023); 7,672,000; 1,139,200 (12.8%)
- Parishes: 132

Information
- Denomination: Catholic Church
- Sui iuris church: Latin Church
- Rite: Roman Rite
- Established: 1886
- Cathedral: Cathedral of Christ the King
- Patron saint: Immaculate Conception of our Lady
- Secular priests: 46 (+ 130 Rel.=176 total)

Current leadership
- Pope: Leo XIV
- Archbishop: Stephen Brislin
- Bishops emeritus: Buti Joseph Tlhagale

Website
- catholicjhb.org.za

The Archdiocese of Johannesburg (Latin: Ioannesburgum) is the a Latin Church ecclesiastical jurisdiction of the Catholic Church in Johannesburg, South Africa. It is the metropolitan see of an ecclesiastical province.

== History ==
- June 4, 1886: Established as Apostolic Prefecture of Transvaal from the Apostolic Vicariate of Natal
- September 16, 1904: Promoted as Apostolic Vicariate of Transvaal
- April 9, 1948: Renamed as Apostolic Vicariate of Johannesburg
- January 11, 1951: Promoted as Diocese of Johannesburg
- June 5, 2007: Promoted as Metropolitan Archdiocese of Johannesburg

== Special churches ==
- The cathedral is the Cathedral of Christ the King in Johannesburg.
- Regina Mundi Catholic Church in Moroka Soweto

== Leadership ==
Vicars Apostolic of Transvaal

- William Miller, O.M.I. (September 17, 1904 – May 2, 1912)
- Charles Cox, O.M.I. (July 15, 1914 – July 14, 1924)

Vicars Apostolic of Johannesburg

- David O'Leary (Bishop), O.M.I. (May 13, 1925 – November 25, 1950)
- William Patrick Whelan, O.M.I. (November 25, 1950 – January 11, 1951 see below)

Bishops of Johannesburg (Roman rite)

- William Patrick Whelan, O.M.I. (January 11, 1951 - July 18, 1954), appointed Archbishop of Bloemfontein
- Hugh Boyle (July 18, 1954 – January 24, 1976)
- Joseph Patrick Fitzgerald, O.M.I. (January 24, 1976 – July 2, 1984), personal title of archbishop
- Reginald Joseph Orsmond (July 2, 1984 – May 19, 2002)
- Buti Joseph Tlhagale, O.M.I. (April 8, 2003 – June 5, 2007), personal title of archbishop

Archbishops of Johannesburg

- Buti Joseph Tlhagale, O.M.I. (June 5, 2007 – October 28, 2024)
- Stephen Brislin (October 28, 2024 – )

=== Coadjutor Vicar Apostolic ===
- William Patrick Whelan, O.M.I. (1948–1950)

=== Auxiliary Bishops ===
- Peter Fanyana John Butelezi, O.M.I. (1972–1975), appointed Bishop of Umtata
- Zithulele Patrick Mvemve (1986–1994), appointed Bishop of Klerksdorp
- Reginald Joseph Orsmond (1983–1984), appointed Bishop here
- Duncan Theodore Tsoke (2016–2021), appointed Bishop of Kimberly

=== Other priests of this diocese who became bishops ===
- Peter John Holiday, appointed Bishop of Kroonstad in 2011
- Luc Julian Matthys (priest here, 1961–1976), appointed Bishop of Armidale, Australia in 1999
- Thomas Graham Rose, appointed Bishop of Dundee in 2008

== Coat of Arms ==
By a decree of the Archbishop of 14 March 2025, the Archdiocese assumed a new Coat of Arms independent of its Archbishop. It is blazoned: "Azure, overall a pallium Argent charged with four crosses patée Sable, within a bordure Or, in chief a ChiRho Or encircled by a crown of the same, in dexter a Marian symbol MA of the same, in sinister a pick-axe and a shovel saltirewise of the same."

== Statistics ==
According to the Statistical Yearbook of the Church 2022 (Annuarium Statisticum Ecclesiae 2022, published in 2024), as at 31 December 2022, the statistics for the Archdiocese are:

- Area: 14,517 km²
- Population: 1,139,200 Catholics (12.8% of 8,900,250 total)
- Pastoral Centres: 131 parishes, 1 mission
- Personnel: 176 priests (46 diocesan, 130 religious), 64 deacons, 455 religious (165 brothers, 290 sisters), 12 seminarians

=== Historical Statistics ===
Year	Catholics	Total Population	Percent Catholic	Diocesan Priests	Religious Priests	Total Priests	Catholics Per Priest	Permanent Deacons	Male Religious	Female Religious	Parishes	Source
Vicariate Apostolic of Johannesburg
1950	90,459	2,024,888	4.50%	9	87	96	942		47	655		ap1951
Diocese of Johannesburg
1970	263,812	3,500,000	7.50%	30	140	170	1,551		212	749	40	ap1971
1980	336,682	3,383,000	10.00%	32	149	181	1,860	1	221	663	100	ap1981
1990	589,000	4,416,000	13.30%	34	126	160	3,681	18	176	565	100	ap1991
1999	700,000	6,000,000	11.70%	47	112	159	4,402	43	158	438	104	ap2000
2000	700,000	6,000,000	11.70%	47	114	161	4,347	41	160	446	104	ap2001
2001	700,000	6,000,000	11.70%	48	116	164	4,268	39	166	447	104	ap2002
2002	700,000	6,000,000	11.70%	46	116	162	4,320	44	167	438	104	ap2003
2003	700,000	6,000,000	11.70%	46	114	160	4,375	44	165	438	104	ap2004
2004	700,000	6,000,000	11.70%	49	118	167	4,191	43	173	445	104	ap2005
2006	704,000	6,036,000	11.70%	49	120	169	4,165	43	176	437	104	ap2007
Archdiocese of Johannesburg
2013	918,456	7,710,000	11.91%	44	137	181	5,074	50	173	361	130	ap2014
2016	1,036,000	8,009,000	12.94%	41	131	172	6,023	48	163	333	131	ap2017
2017	1,064,445	8,228,845	12.94%	46	132	178	5,980	61	172	314	133	ap2018
2019	1,081,000	8,357,555	12.93%	52	132	184	5,875	69	172	318	133	ap2020
2021	1,112,360	8,690,460	12.80%	51	127	178	6,249	60	165	310	133	ap2022
2022	1,127,930	8,812,130	12.80%	45	131	176	6,409	65	168	307	132	ap2023
2023	1,139,200	8,900,250	12.80%	46	130	176	6,473	64	165	290	132	ap2024
Source: Catholic-Hierarchy, which in turn takes the data from the Annuario Pontificio.

=== Recent Number of Seminarians ===
Year	Seminarians
2013	19
2015	23
2017	21
2018	15
2020	19
2021	12
2022	12

== Suffragan dioceses ==
- Klerksdorp
- Manzini
- Witbank

== See also ==
- Catholic Church in South Africa
