= Maria Domenica Mazzarello =

Italian Roman Catholic saint

Saint Maria Domenica Mazzarello FMA
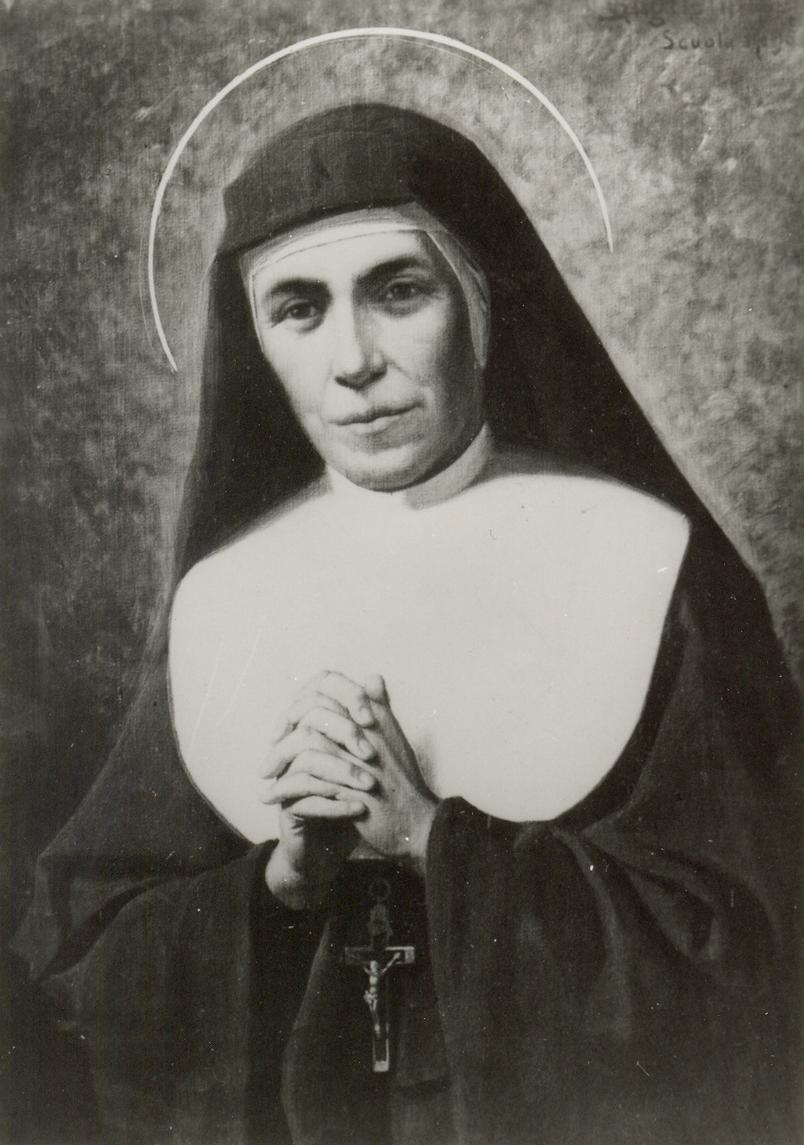

Religious sister and Foundress
- Born: 9 May 1837; Mornese, Alessandria, Italy
- Died: 14 May 1881 (aged 44), Mornese
- Venerated in: Catholic Church
- Beatified: 20 November 1938, Saint Peter's Basilica, Vatican City by Pope Pius XI
- Canonized: 24 June 1951, Saint Peter's Basilica, Vatican City by Pope Pius XII
- Major shrine: Basilica of Our Lady Help of Christians, Turin, Italy
- Feast: 13 May

Maria Domenica Mazzarello, FMA (9 May 1837 – 14 May 1881) was an Italian Catholic nun who co-founded the Salesian Sisters of Don Bosco.

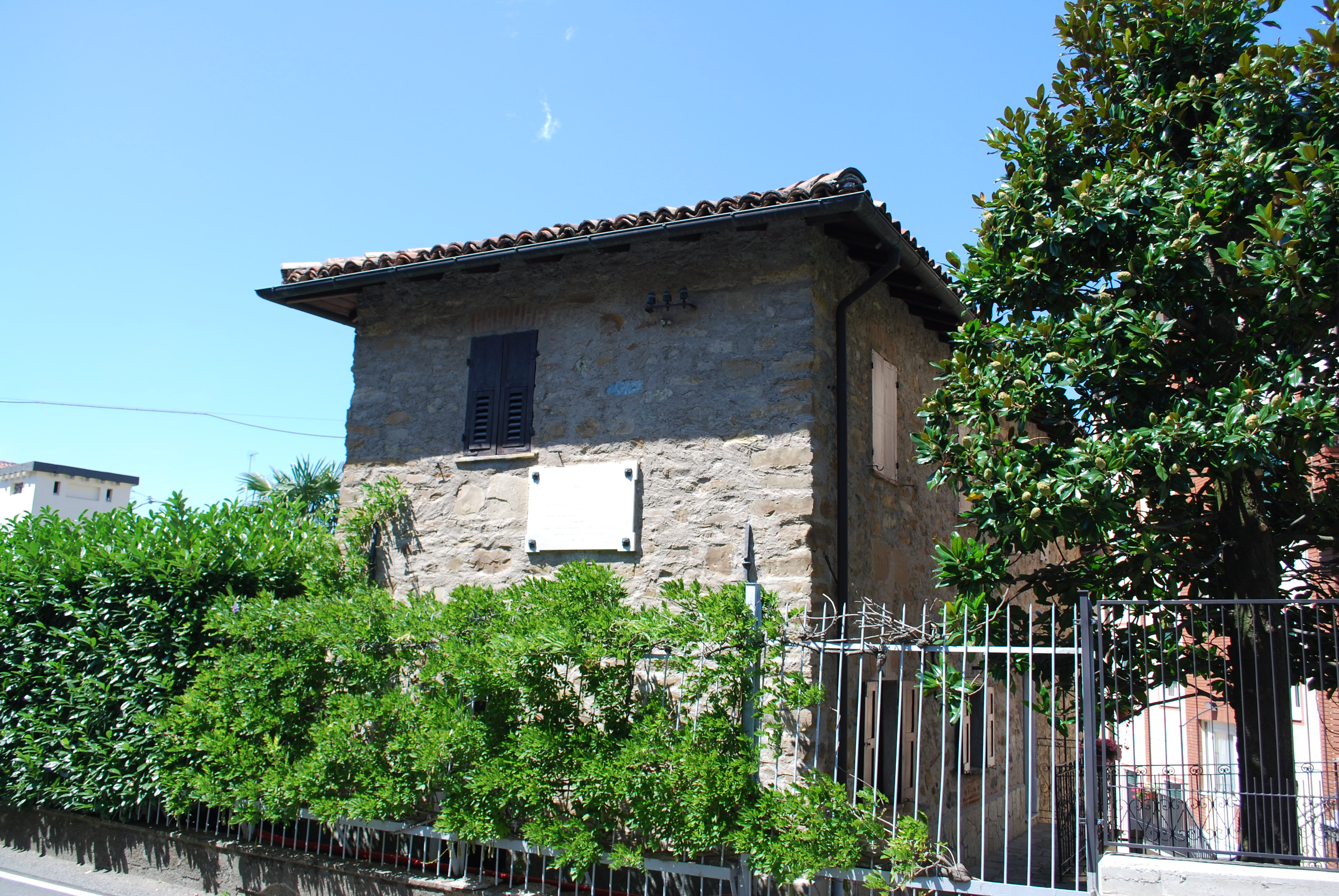
Mazzarelli, the place where Maria Mazzarello was born

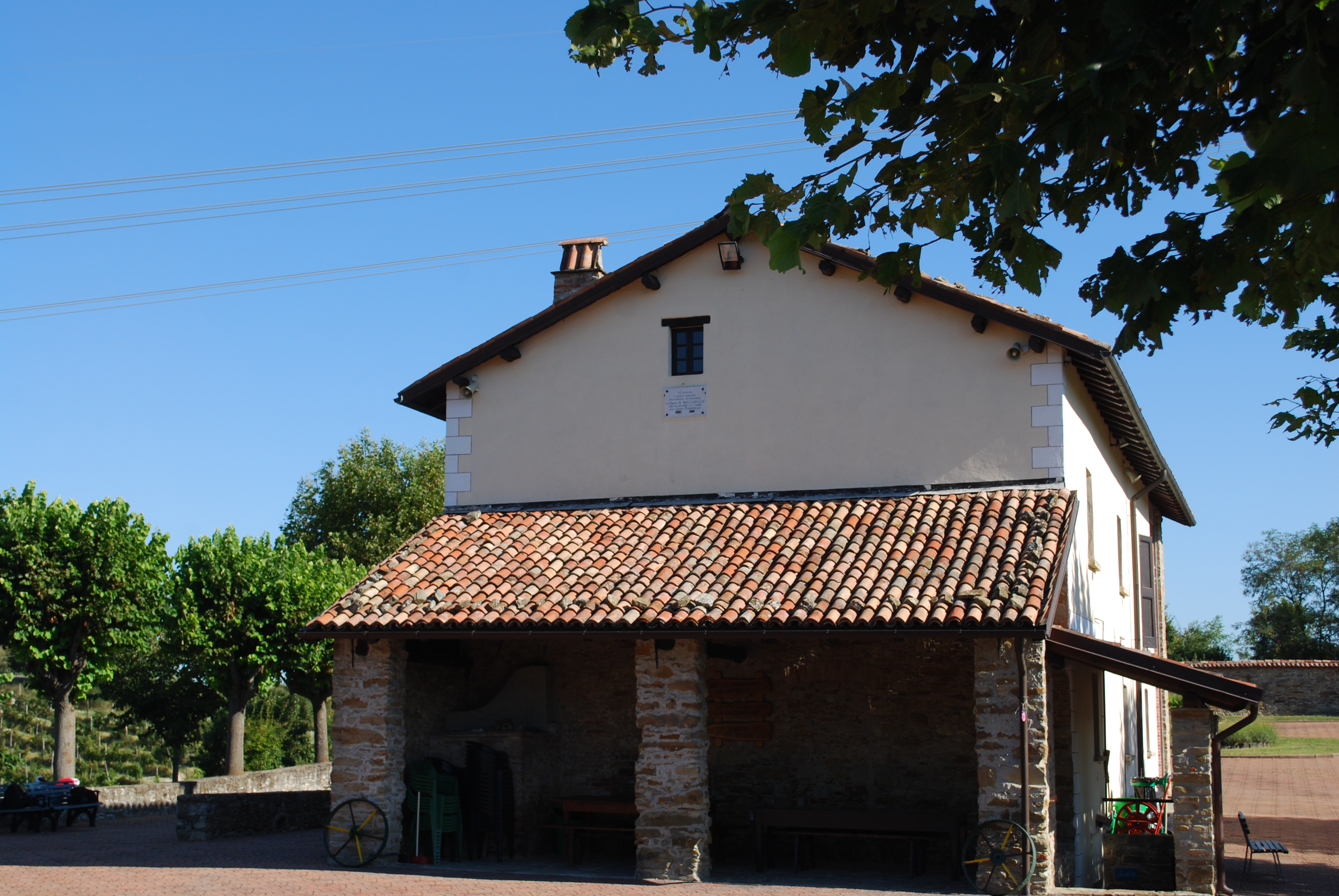
Valponasca, the place where Maria Mazzarello spent her childhood

== Life ==
She was born in Mornese, in what is now the province of Alessandria, northern Italy, to a peasant family who worked in a vineyard. She was the eldest of ten children of Joseph and Maddalena Calcagno Mazzarelli. When she was fifteen she had joined the Association of the Daughters of Mary Immaculate, known for charitable works, and run by the parish priest, Domenico Pestarino; it was a precursor to the founding of the Salesian Sisters.

When she was 23 years old, a typhoid epidemic hit Mornese causing the death of many villagers. Soon, her uncle and aunt were taken ill and Mary volunteered to care for them and their many children. After a week they recovered, however when Mary returned home, she also became ill with typhoid. Due to this, she received the last rites of the Catholic Church. She recovered, but the illness left her weak. The strength which had formerly sustained her in her work in the fields was no more. Mary was now thin and frail; a shell of her formerly robust self.

She took an apprenticeship as a seamstress in the town and worked diligently at the craft. Like John Bosco, the skills which she learned in her youth, she was able to pass on to those who would come after her. After she recovered from her illness, in the month of October, Mary was walking in her village and was suddenly astounded to see before her a large building with a courtyard and many girls playing and laughing. A voice said to her, "I entrust them to you".

The education of girls was a particular need in the nineteenth century, and Mary decided to devote herself to this work. Hosts of farm girls from the country, or serving girls, factory workers, and street vending girls filled the streets of the city; and all of them were at risk to juvenile prostitution. She wished to educate them, and teach them a trade, to save them from the dangers of street life. She persuaded some of her girl friends to join her in this project. Fifteen young women now comprised the Daughters of Mary Immaculate. Pestarino busied himself with training them in the spiritual life and managed to secure a place for some of them to live in community, thus was the beginning of religious life in Mornese. The Daughters took in a few young girls and housed them, schooling them in the faith and handing down to them their knowledge of dress making.

John Bosco was told of the Daughters by Pestarino, who himself was training as a Salesian of Don Bosco under the saint. Considering his vision of the young girls, Bosco decided to meet with them. He went to Mornese with his boy band under the guise of raising funds for his Oratory, but his true intention was to investigate the possibility of founding a female counterpart of the male Salesian religious order from the Daughters of Mary Immaculate.

== Institute of the Daughters of Mary Help of Christians ==
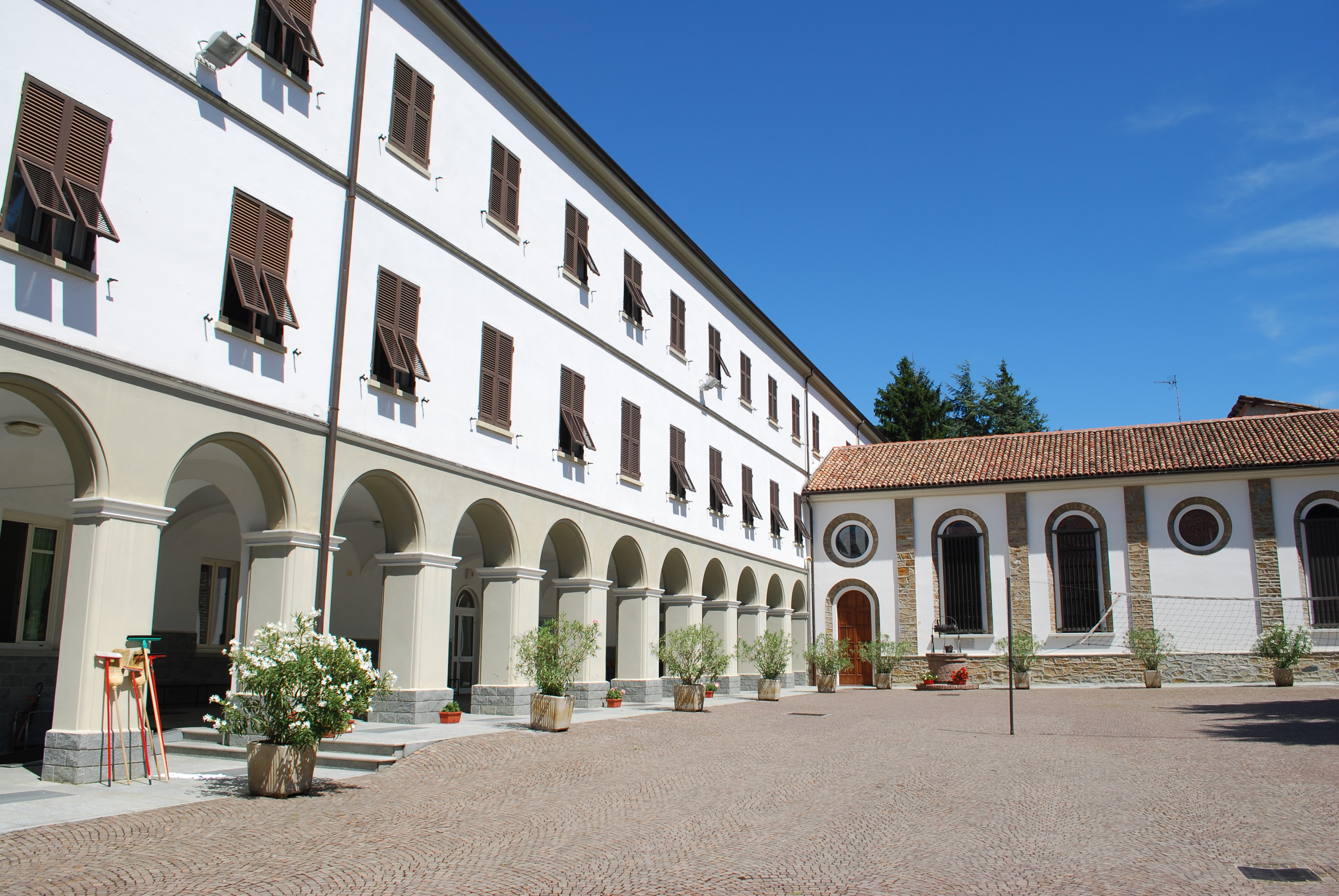
Collegio, the first community of the Daughters of Mary Help of Christians

In 1867, after meeting with them and receiving the Daughters' enthusiastic response to his proposal, Bosco drew up their first rule of life. A source of the community's good spirit, sense of humor, optimism and charity, Mary Mazzarello was the natural choice for the first superior. Eventually obedience won out and she was the first Mother of the young community at age thirty.

After much formation, struggles, the well-intentioned but misdirected advice of others, and difficulties with the townspeople (whose school for boys which they had raised money for and built was turned over to the Daughters for their work by Bosco), the day of their profession arrived. The fifteen young women, led by Mary Mazzarello, professed their vows as religious women in the presence of the Bishop of Acqui, their spiritual father Bosco, and Pestarino. 31 July 1872 was the birthday of the new religious family.

At age thirty-five, donned in a habit, she was now Sister Mary Mazzarello. She and the fourteen other newly professed religious sisters made up the fledgling order. The Daughters of Mary Help of Christians were officially founded. Mary was asked by Bosco to temporarily fulfill the role of superior until he could call together all the sisters to a council for the election of a General Superior. As the feminine branch of the Salesian religious family, the Daughters of Mary Help of Christians sought to do for girls what the priests and brothers were doing in Turin for boys.

After being elected Mother General of the Salesian Sisters, Mary Mazzarello felt that it was important that she and the other sisters have a good understanding of how to read and write; it was a skill which many of them had never had the opportunity to acquire.

Her dedication to the sisters was not limited to their intellectual formation; she also took an active role in their personal and spiritual development. As a result, members of the congregation referred to her as "Mother Mazzarello".

The first missionary sisters set out for Uruguay in 1877. Mother Mazzarello accompanied them to their port of call in Genoa, Italy, and then took a boat to France so that she could visit the sisters there.

In Marseille their ship broke down and had to be repaired. All of the passengers were forced to disembark while it was dry docked. Although the Sisters had been told that lodging had been prepared for them, there was a mix-up and they were left without beds to sleep on. Mother Mazzarello was not one to let events such as that discourage her so she took the sheets that they brought with them stuffed them with straw, and made makeshift beds for all of them. After a miserable night of sleep they all awoke, but Mother Mazzarello could not get up. A fever was ravaging her body and she was in terrible pain. The next morning, more out of a concern for worrying her already exhausted companions, she was able to get up, see the missionaries off, and then journey with her remaining Sisters to their house and orphanage in St. Cyr.

== Death ==
Once in St. Cyr she fainted and was in bed for forty days the diagnosis was pleurisy.

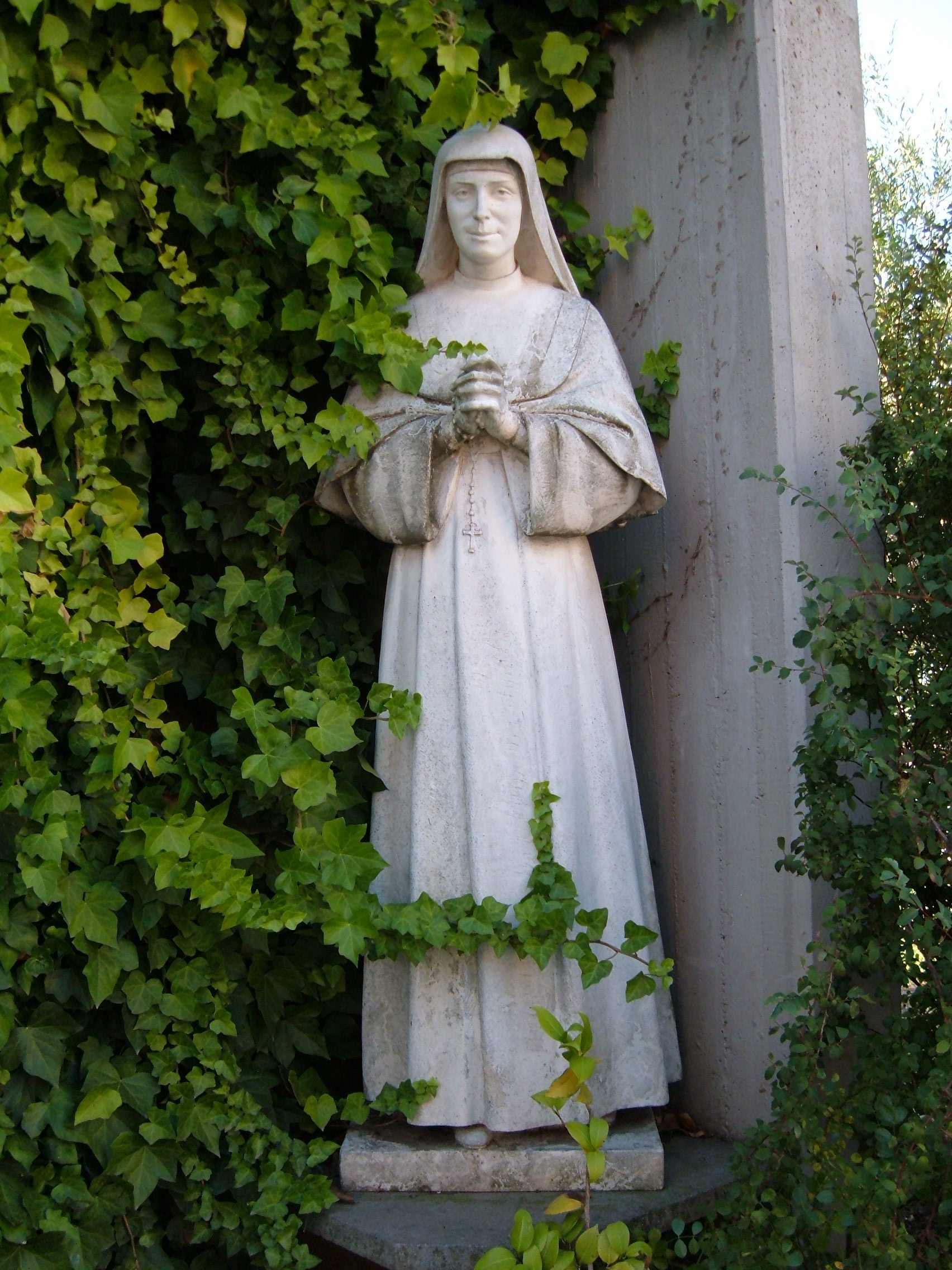
Statue of Maria Domenica Mazzarello at the Roman church named in her honour

Eventually she returned to Italy, even though the doctor told her not to. She said that she wanted to die in her own community. She made her return journey in stages, as she did not want to push herself too much; she was painfully aware of her delicate condition. Fortunately on one of her stops Bosco was near and they were able to meet for the last time.

In early April, Mary returned to Nizza Monferrato. Her native air strengthened her and since she felt stronger she insisted on keeping the community schedule and doing her usual work. Unfortunately it was too much for her and she relapsed. Near the end of April it seemed that death was approaching. Finally, in the pre-dawn hours of 14 May 1881, Mother Mazzarello began her death agony. After receiving the last rites she turned her attention to those around her and weakly whispered, "Good-bye. I am going now. I will see you in heaven." She died shortly after, at the age of 44.

== Veneration ==
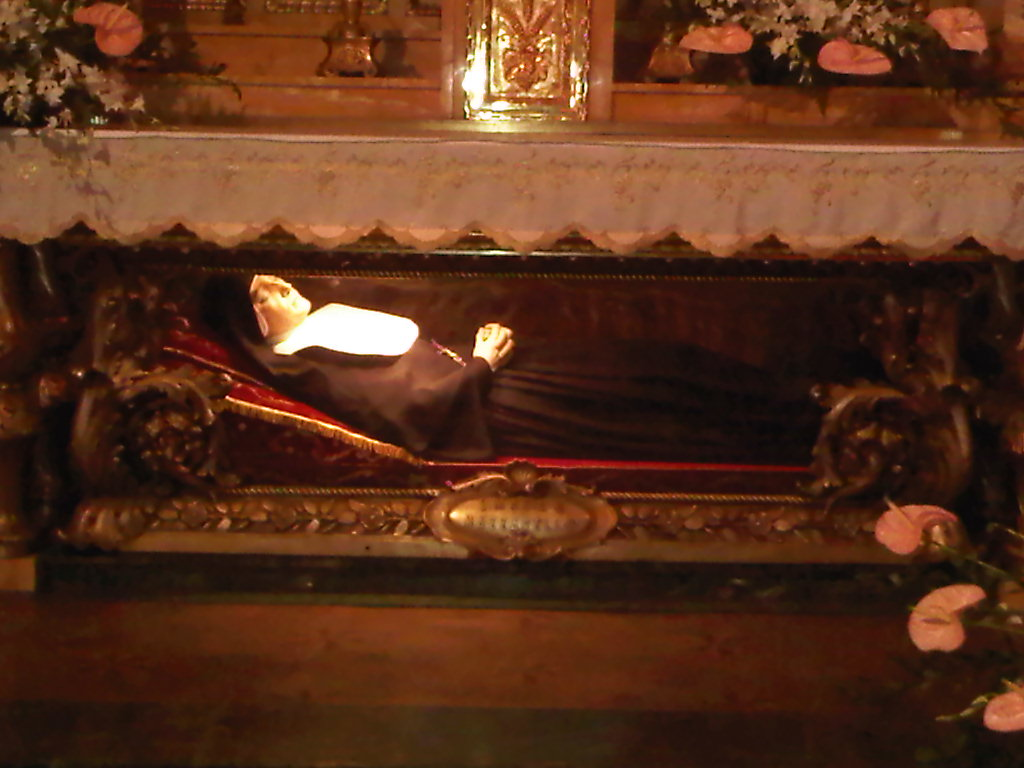
In the Basilica of Our Lady Help of Christians, Turin

She was beatified on 20 November 1938 and canonized on 24 June 1951. Her incorrupt body is venerated in the Basilica of Our Lady Help of Christians, in Turin, Italy. A church in southeast Rome bears her name, Santa Maria Domenica Mazzarello.

== In popular culture ==
Mazzarello was the subject of the 2012 Italian biopic film Maìn - La casa della felicità (Maìn - The House of Happiness), directed by Simone Spada with Gaia Insenga playing Mazzarello.
