= Buti Joseph Tlhagale =

South African Roman Catholic prelate

His Excellency Buti Joseph Tlhagale
- Archbishop Emeritus of Johannesburg
- Church: Catholic Church
- Archdiocese: Roman Catholic Archdiocese of Johannesburg
- See: Roman Catholic Archdiocese of Johannesburg
- Appointed: 8 April 2003
- Term ended: 28 October 2024
- Predecessor: Reginald Joseph Orsmond
- Successor: Stephen Brislin
- Other post: Archbishop of Bloemfontein

Orders
- Ordination: 29 August 1976
- Consecration: 29 June 2003 by Denis Eugene Hurley
- Rank: Archbishop

Personal details
- Born: Buti Joseph Tlhagale; 26 December 1947 (age 78) Randfontein, Gauteng, South Africa

Styles of Buti Joseph Tlhagale
- Reference style: His Excellency; The Most Reverend
- Spoken style: Your Excellency
- Religious style: Bishop

Buti Joseph Tlhagale (born 26 December 1947) is a South African Catholic prelate who was the Archbishop of the Roman Catholic Archdiocese of Johannesburg in South Africa. He was appointed Archbishop of Johannesburg on 5 June 2007 by Pope Benedict XVI. He retired as archbishop on 28 October 2024 and stayed on as Archbishop Emeritus of Johannesburg.

== Background and education ==
He was born on 26 December 1947 in Randfontein, Gauteng, South Africa. He completed his secondary school studies at Inchanga High School, near Pietermaritzburg, KwaZulu-Natal. He entered the novitiate of the Oblates of Mary Immaculate at Villa Maria, Quthing, Lesotho, in 1967. The following year, he entered the Mater Jesu Scholasticate in Roma, Maseru District, Lesotho. In 1972 he graduated from the University of Botswana, Lesotho and Swaziland with a Bachelor of Arts degree. He studied theology at the Pontifical Gregorian University in Rome, Italy from 1972 until 1976.

== Priesthood ==
He professed as a member of the Oblates of Mary Immaculate in 1967. He was ordained a priest on 29 August 1976 by Bishop Peter Fanyana John Butelezi, OMI, Bishop of Umtata.

While a priest he served in various roles including as:

- Priest at Our Lady of Fatima in Dube, Soweto, South Africa from 1979 until 1984
- Priest at Our Lady of Mercy in Endeni, Soweto, from 1984 until 1989
- Priest at Christ the King in Orlando East, from 1989 until 1999
- Visiting Lecturer at St. Joseph's Theological Institute (St. Joseph's Scholasticate) in Cedara, KwaZulu-Natal
- Lecturer in Philosophy at St Peter's Major Seminary in Hammanskraal
- Member of the Justice and Peace Department of the South African Council of Churches from 1979 until 1980
- Secretary General of the Southern African Catholic Bishops' Conference (SACBC) from 1995 until 1999.

== As bishop ==
On 2 January 1999 Pope John Paul II appointed Father Buti Joseph Tlhagale, as Archbishop of the Roman Catholic Archdiocese of Bloemfontein. He was consecrated bishop and installed Archbishop of Bloemfontein on 10 April 1999, at the Vista University Stadium, Bloemfontein, Archdiocese of Bloemfontein. The Principal Consecrator was Archbishop Denis Eugene Hurley, OMI, Archbishop Emeritus of Durban assisted by Bishop Louis Ncamiso Ndlovu, OSM, Bishop of Manzini and Bishop Reginald Joseph Orsmond, Bishop of Johannesburg.

On 8 April 2003, Pope John Paul II appointed him as Bishop of the Diocese of Johannesburg. He was installed there on 29 June 2003. On 5 June 2007, Pope Benedict XVI elevated the Diocese of Johannesburg to an Archdiocese. Bishop Tlhagale then became the Archbishop of Johannesburg, South Africa. He served as the Apostolic Administrator of the Roman Catholic Diocese of Klerksdorp, South Africa from 26 April 2013 until 25 January 2015.

On 28 October 2024, Pope Francis accepted the letter requesting the retirement of Archbishop Buti Joseph Tlhagale, OMI, effective that day. The South African prelate retired that day and is now the Archbishop Emeritus of Johannesburg, South Africa.

== See also ==
- Catholic Church in South Africa

== Succession table ==
Catholic Church titles
Preceded by Peter Fanyana John Butelezi (1978–1997)	Archbishop of Archdiocese of Bloemfontein; 1999–2003	Succeeded by Jabulani Adatus Nxumalo (2005–2020)
Preceded by Reginald Joseph Orsmond (1984–2002)	Archbishop of Diocese of Johannesburg (Elevated to Archdiocese in 2007); 2003–2024	Succeeded by Stephen Brislin (Since 28 October 2024)
