= Santa Maria Domenica Mazzarello, Rome =

Church of Santa Maria Domenica Mazzarello
- Parrocchia Santa Maria Domenica Mazzarello
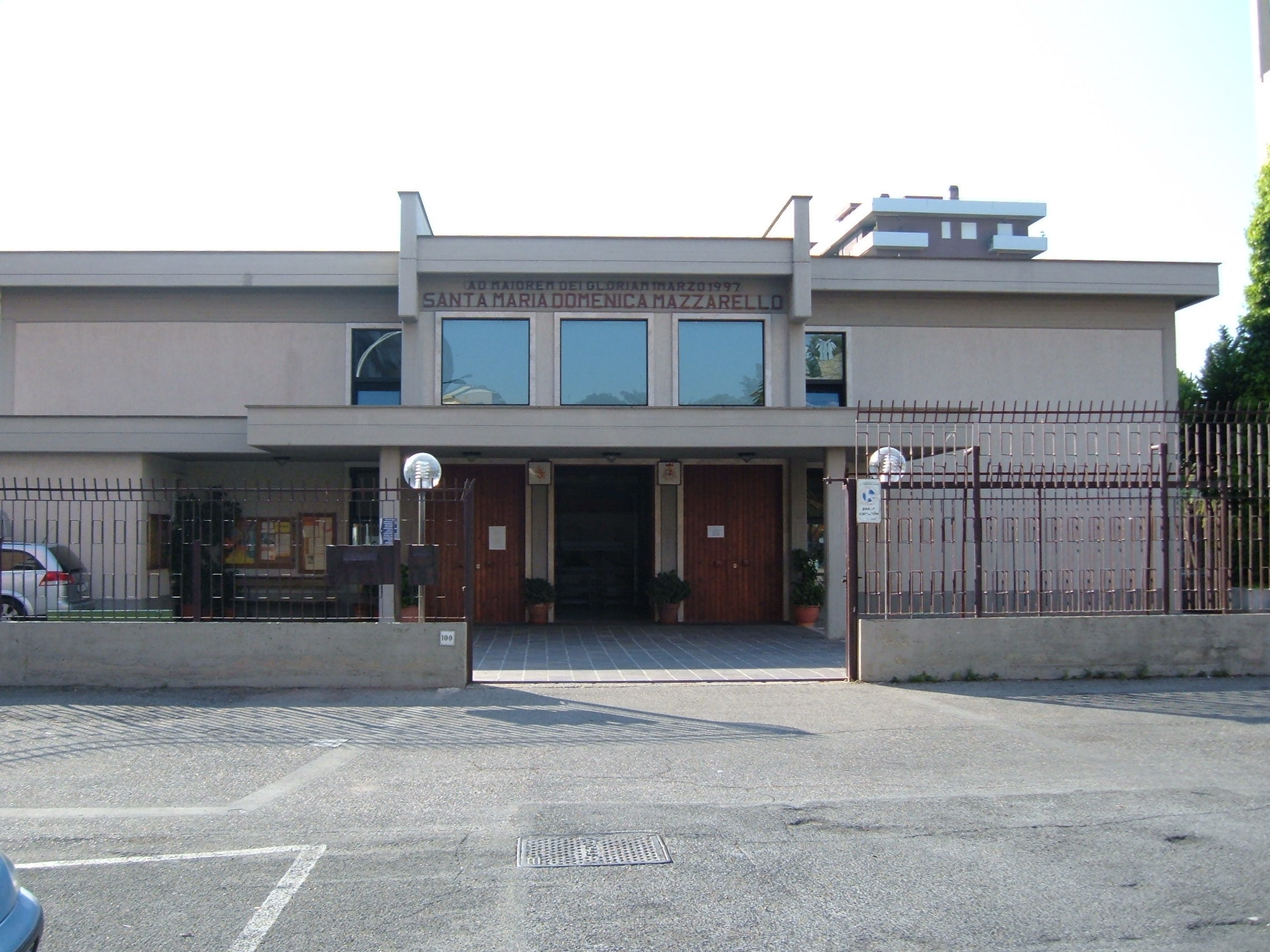
- Entrance
- Click on the map for a fullscreen view
- 41.86020°N 12.576795°E
- Location: Piazza Salvatore Galgano 100, Rome
- Country: Italy
- Denomination: Roman Catholic
- Tradition: Roman Rite
- Website: Official website, unsafe

History
- Status: Titular church
- Dedication: Maria Domenica Mazzarello

Architecture
- Architectural type: Church
- Completed: 1997

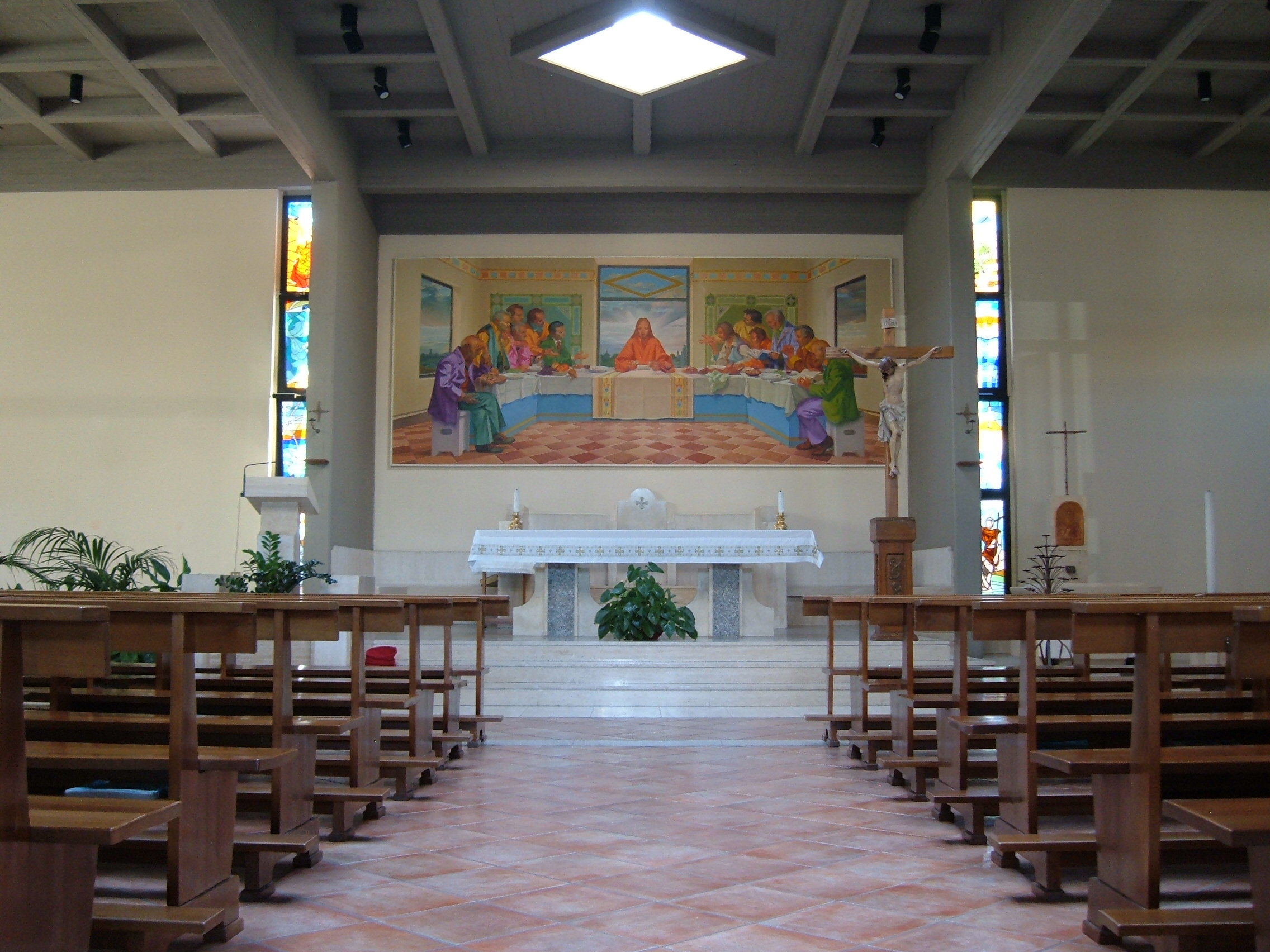
Interior

Santa Maria Domenica Mazzarello is a parish church of the Diocese of Rome as well as a titular church to which a cardinal priest is sometimes assigned.

== Church ==
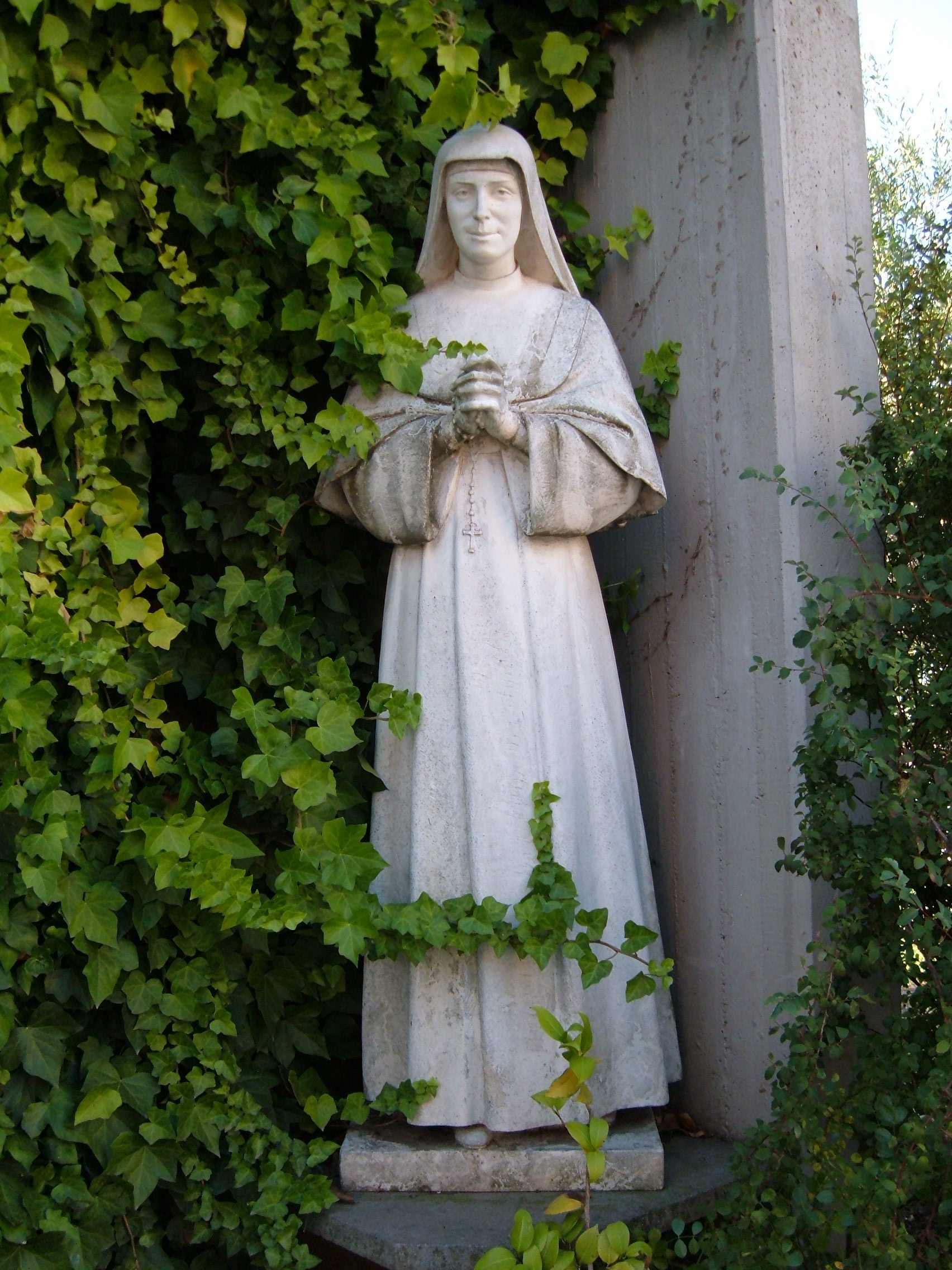
Statue of Maria Domenica Mazzarello on the site

The Chiesa di Santa Maria Domenica Mazzarello is dedicated to Saint Maria Domenica Mazzarello (1837–1881), Italian founder of the Salesian Sisters.

It was built in 1997 as a parish church in the Roman Catholic Diocese of Rome and seats 300. Its address is Piazza Salvatore Galgano 100, Roma, Lazio 00173, at the Viale Bruno Pelizze, in East Rome's XXth prefecture.

Pope John Paul II visited the church on 14 December 1997.

The church was established as a titular church on 21 February 2001.

== Cardinal-protectors ==
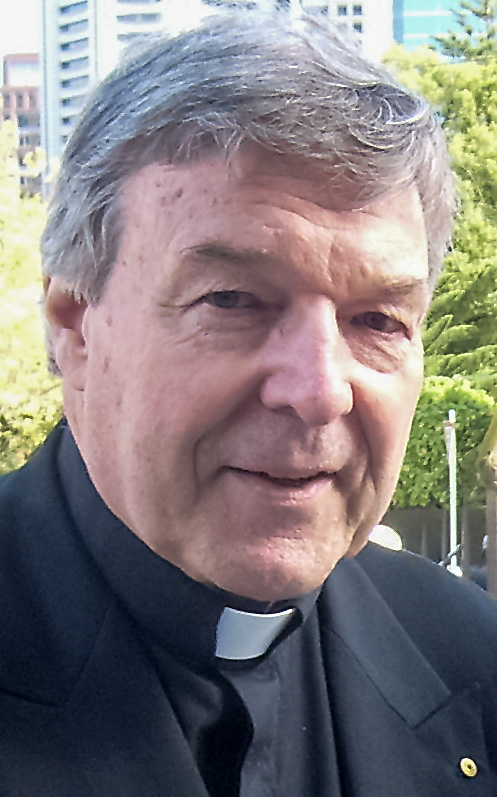
Cardinal Pell in 2008

- Venezuelan Cardinal Ignacio Antonio Velasco García, S.D.B. (February 21, 2001 – July 6, 2003)
- Australian Cardinal George Pell (October 21, 2003 – January 10, 2023) had been the Cardinal-Priest since 2004
- South African Cardinal Stephen Brislin (September 30, 2023 - Present) having been the Cardinal-Priest since 2023.

== Sources and external links ==
- GCatholic the cardinal title
- GCatholic the church
- Parochial website (in Italian)
