= Diocese of Queenstown =

Latin Catholic diocese in South Africa

Coordinates: 31.9000°S 26.8833°E

Diocese of Queenstown Dioecesis Civitatis Reginae seu Queenstovensis

Location
- Country: South Africa
- Metropolitan: Cape Town

Statistics
- Area: 25,000 km^{2} (9,700 sq mi)
- Population: Total; Catholics: (as of 2004); 2,110,000; 56,000 (2.7%)

Information
- Denomination: Catholic Church
- Sui iuris church: Latin Church
- Rite: Roman Rite

Current leadership
- Pope: Leo XIV
- Bishop: Siphiwo Devilliers Paul Vanqa

The Diocese of Queenstown (Latin: Queenstovnen(sis)) is a Latin Catholic diocese located in the town of Queenstown in the ecclesiastical province of Cape Town in South Africa.

== History ==
- 1928: Established as the Mission “sui iuris” of Queenstown from the Apostolic Vicariate of Cape of Good Hope, Eastern District
- March 29, 1938: Promoted as the Apostolic Prefecture of Queenstown
- April 9, 1948: Promoted as the Apostolic Vicariate of Queenstown
- January 11, 1951: Promoted as the Diocese of Queenstown

== Special churches ==
- The cathedral is the Cathedral of Christ the King in Queenstown.

== Bishops ==
- Prefect Apostolic of Queenstown
  - Fr. John Baptist Rosenthal, S.A.C. (1940.02.09 – 1948.04.09 see below)
- Vicar Apostolic of Queenstown
  - Bishop John Baptist Rosenthal, S.A.C. (see above 1948.04.09 – 1951.01.11 see below)
- Bishops of Queenstown
  - Bishop John Baptist Rosenthal, S.A.C. (see above 1951.01.11 – 1972.02.03)
  - Bishop John Baptist Rosner, S.A.C. (1972.02.03 – 1984.02.03)
  - Bishop Herbert Nikolaus Lenhof, S.A.C. (1984.02.03 – 2009.11.16)
  - Bishop Dabula Anthony Mpako (23 May 2011 – 30 April 2019), appointed Archbishop of Pretoria and Bishop of South Africa, Military
  - Bishop Siphiwo Devilliers Paul Vanqa, S.A.C. (since 3 March 2021)

=== Other priest of this diocese who became bishop ===
- Sithembele Anton Sipuka, appointed Bishop of Umtata in 2008

== See also ==
- Catholic Church in South Africa

== Sources ==
- GCatholic.org
- Catholic Hierarchy
