= Diocese of Keimoes–Upington =

Latin Catholic diocese in South Africa

Coordinates: 28°42′S 20°58′E

Diocese of Keimoes–Upington Dioecesis Keimoesana-Upingtonensis
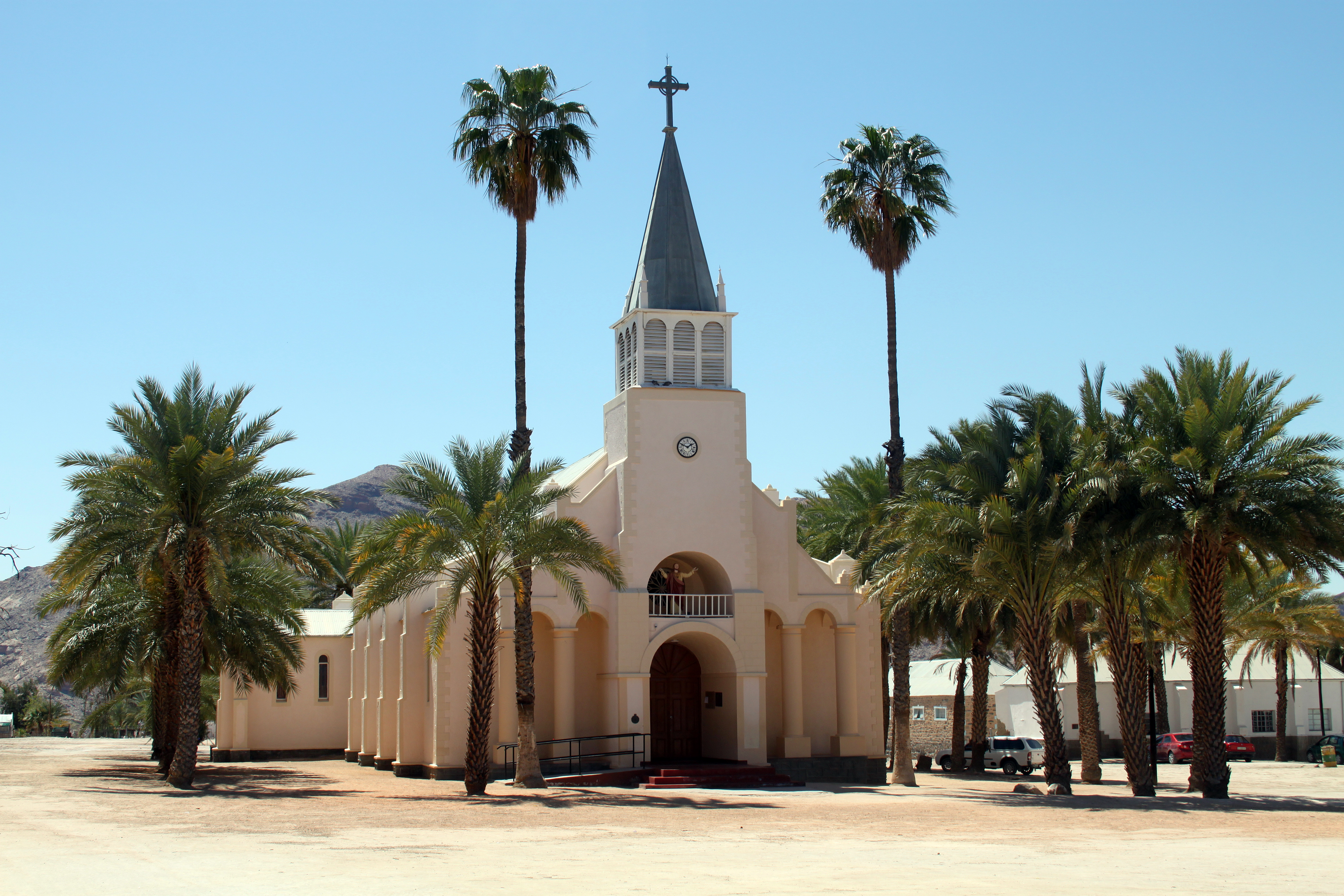
- Immaculate Conception Cathedral, Pella (Khâi-Ma Local Municipality)

Location
- Country: South Africa
- Metropolitan: Bloemfontein

Statistics
- Area: 272,265 km^{2} (105,122 sq mi)
- Population: Total; Catholics: (as of 2004); 331,984; 60,501 (18.2%)

Information
- Denomination: Catholic Church
- Sui iuris church: Latin Church
- Rite: Roman Rite
- Patron saint: The Immaculate Conception & St. Francis de Sales

Current leadership
- Pope: Leo XIV
- Bishop: vacant

The Diocese of Keimoes–Upington (Latin: Dioecesis Keimoesana–Upingtonensis) is a South African Latin Catholic diocese located around the towns of Keimoes and Upington (ZF Mgcawu District Municipality, Northern Cape) in the ecclesiastical province of Bloemfontein.

== History ==
- June 20, 1885: Established as Apostolic Prefecture of Orange River from the Apostolic Prefecture of Cape of Good Hope, Central District
- May 2, 1898: Promoted as Apostolic Vicariate of Orange River
- July 9, 1940: Renamed as Apostolic Vicariate of Keimoes
- January 11, 1951: Promoted as Diocese of Keimoes
- February 8, 1985: Renamed as Diocese of Keimoes – Upington

== Special churches ==
The cathedral is the Cathedral of the Immaculate Conception in Pella (Namakwa District Municipality). The co-cathedral is the Co-Cathedral of St. Augustine in Upington.

== Bishops ==
- Vicars Apostolic of Orange River (Roman rite)
  - Bishop Jean-Marie Simon, O.S.F.S. (1886 – 1898.05.03)
  - Bishop Anthony Gaughren, O.M.I. (1886.06.08 – 1901.01.15)
  - Bishop Jean-Marie Simon, O.S.F.S. (1898.05.03 – 1932.11.21)
  - Bishop Odilon Fages, O.S.F.S. (1932.11.21 – 1939.10.14)
- Vicar Apostolic of Keimoes (Roman rite)
  - Bishop Henry Joseph Thünemann, O.S.F.S. (1940.07.09 – 1951.01.11 see below)
- Bishops of Keimoes (Roman rite)
  - Bishop Henry Joseph Thünemann, O.S.F.S. (see above 1951.01.11 – 1962.09.12)
  - Bishop Francis Esser, O.S.F.S. (1962.09.12 – 1966.12.08)
  - Bishop John Baptist Minder, O.S.F.S. (1967.10.12 – 1985.02.08 see below)
- Bishops of Keimoes–Upington (Roman rite)
  - Bishop John Baptist Minder, O.S.F.S. (see above 1985.02.08 – 2000.07.05)
  - Bishop Edward Gabriel Risi, O.M.I. (2000.07.05 – 2025.12.04)

=== Coadjutor Bishops ===
- Francis Xavier Esser, O.S.F.S. (1955-1962)
- Odilon Fages, O.S.F.S. (1928-1932), as Coadjutor Vicar Apostolic

== See also ==
- Catholic Church in South Africa

== Sources ==
- GCatholic.org
- Catholic Hierarchy
- Diocese of Keimoes–Upington Website
