= Diocese of Kroonstad =

Latin Catholic diocese in South Africa

Coordinates: 27.6500°S 27.2333°E

Diocese of Kroonstad Dioecesis Kroonstadensis

Location
- Country: South Africa
- Metropolitan: Bloemfontein

Statistics
- Area: 30,248 km^{2} (11,679 sq mi)
- Population: Total; Catholics: (as of 2004); 940,153; 86,512 (9.2%)

Information
- Denomination: Catholic Church
- Sui iuris church: Latin Church
- Rite: Roman Rite

Current leadership
- Pope: Leo XIV
- Bishop: Amos Mabuti Masemola
- Bishops emeritus: Peter John Holiday

The Diocese of Kroonstad (Latin: Kroonstaden(sis)) is a Latin Catholic diocese located in the city of Kroonstad in the ecclesiastical province of Bloemfontein in South Africa. The last ordinary was Bishop Peter Holiday whose resignation for health reasons was accepted on 12 December 2022. Amos Mabuti Masemola 17 February 2025 –

== History ==
- 26 November 1923: Established as Apostolic Prefecture of Kroonstad from the Apostolic Vicariate of Kimberley in South Africa
- 8 April 1935: Promoted as Apostolic Vicariate of Kroonstad
- 11 January 1951: Promoted as Diocese of Kroonstad

== Leadership ==
- Prefects Apostolic of Kroonstad (Roman rite)
  - Fr. Guglielmo Herting, C.S.Sp. (1923 – 1924)
  - Fr. Léon Klerlein, C.S.Sp. (1924.03.24 – 1935.04.08 see below)
- Vicars Apostolic of Kroonstad (Roman rite)
  - Bishop Léon Klerlein, C.S.Sp. (see above 1935.04.08 – 1948.02.12), appointed Vicar Apostolic of Bethlehem
  - Bishop Gerard Marie Franciskus van Velsen, O.P. (1950.05.31 – 1951.01.11 see below)
- Bishops of Kroonstad (Roman rite)
  - Bishop Gerard Marie Franciskus van Velsen, O.P. (see above 1951.01.11 – 1975.11.15)
  - Bishop Johannes Ludgerus Bonaventure Brenninkmeijer, O.P. (15 April 1977 - 2 July 2003)
  - Bishop Stephen Brislin (17 October 2006 - 18 December 2009), appointed Archbishop of Cape Town
  - Bishop Peter John Holiday (1 April 2011 - 12 December 2022)
  - Bishop-Elect Amos Mabuti Masemola (since 17 February 2026)

== See also ==
- Catholic Church in South Africa

== Sources ==
- GCatholic.org
- Catholic Hierarchy
