= Zolile Peter Mpambani =

South African Catholic prelate (born 1957)

The Most Reverend Zolile Peter Mpambani
- Archbishop of Bloemfontein, South Africa
- Church: Catholic Church
- Archdiocese: Roman Catholic Archdiocese of Bloemfontein
- See: Bloemfontein
- Appointed: 1 April 2020
- Installed: 19 June 2020
- Predecessor: Jabulani Adatus Nxumalo
- Successor: Incumbent
- Other posts: Bishop of Kokstad, South Africa (6 May 2013 - 1 April 2020); Apostolic Administrator of Diocese of Keimoes-Upington, South Africa (since 15 December 2025)

Orders
- Ordination: 25 April 1987
- Consecration: 23 August 2013 by William Matthew Slattery
- Rank: Archbishop

Personal details
- Born: Zolile Peter Mpambani; 20 February 1957 (age 69) Umlami, Diocese of Aliwal, Eastern Cape, South Africa
- Motto: "As I have loved you, love one another"

Styles of Zolile Peter Mpambani
- Reference style: Your Lordship; The Most Reverend
- Spoken style: His Lordship
- Religious style: Archbishop

Zolile Peter Mpambani, S.C.I (born 20 February 1957) is a South African Catholic prelate who is the archbishop of the Roman Catholic Archdiocese of Bloemfontein, in South Africa, since 1 April 2020. Before that, he served as Bishop of the Diocese of Kokstad, in South Africa from 6 May 2013 until 1 April 2020. He was appointed bishop by Pope Francis. His episcopal consecration took place on 3 August 2013 at Kokstad by the hands of William Matthew Slattery, Archbishop of the Pretoria. On 1 April 2020, The Holy Father transferred him to Bloemfontein and appointed him Archbishop of the Ecclesiastical Metropolitan Province of Bloemfontein. He was installed at Bloemfontein on 19 June 2020. In December 2025, Pope Leo XIV appointed him apostolic administrator of the Diocese of Keimoes-Upington, South Africa, to run concurrently with his duties as archbishop. He is a member of the Catholic relogious order of the Congregation of the Priests of the Sacred Heart of Jesus (S.C.I.).

== Background and education ==
He was born on 20 February 1957 in Umlami, Diocese of Aliwal, Eastern Cape, in South Africa. On 28 January 1982, he professed as a member of the "Congregation of the Priests of the Sacred Heart of Jesus" (Dehonians). He studied philosophy and theology at the Saint Joseph Major Seminary, in Cedara, KwaZulu-Natal, South Africa. He was ordained a priest for the Congregation of the Priests of the Sacred Heart of Jesus on 25 April 1987.

== Priest ==
On 25 April 1987, he was ordained a priest for the Congregation of the Priests of the Sacred Heart of Jesus. He served in that capacity until 6 May 2013. While a priest, he served in various capacities and locations including as:

- Parish vicar in the parish of Sterkspruit, South Africa from 1987 until 1990.
- Parish priest in Burgerdorp Parish from 1990 until 1993.
- Master of the pre-novitiate of the Dehonians Province from 1994 until 1997.
- General Councilor for Africa and Madagascar of the Central Government of his Religious Order, in Rome, Italy from 1998 until 2003.
- Sabbatical Year from 2004 until 2005.
- Master of the pre-novitiate of the province from 2005 until 2010.
- Local Superior of the Community in Bethulie from 2005 until 2010.
- Director of the Dehonian House, in Scottsville, Pietermaritzburg from 2005 until 2010.
- Ministry, together with the Vicar General, in the parish of Sterkspruit, in the Diocese of Aliwal from 2011 until 2013.
- Provincial Superior in the Congregation of the Priests of the Sacred Heart of Jesus of South Africa from February to May 2013.

== Bishop ==
On 6 May 2013, Pope Francis appointed Reverend Father Monsignor Zolile Peter Mpambani, S.C.I., as bishop of the Diocese of Kokstad, South Africa. He was consecrated at Kokstad, on 3 August 2013 by the hands of William Matthew Slattery, Archbishop of Pretoria assisted by Stephen Brislin, Archbishop of Cape Town and Michael Wüstenberg, Bishop of Aliwal.

On 1 April 2020, The Holy Father accepted the resignation from the pastoral care of the Archdiocese of Bloemfontein, South Africa, presented by Archbishop Jabulani Adatus Nxumalo. Pope Francis transferred Bishop Zolile Peter Mpambani previously the local ordinary at Kokstad to Bloemfontein and appointed him archbishop there. He was installed as archbishop at Bloemfontein on 19 June 2020.

On 15 December 2025, in addition to his duties as archbishop, Pope Leo XIV appointed him apostolic administrator of the Diocese of Keimoes–Upington, to serve there until a suitable local ordinary is appointed.

== See also ==
- Catholic Church in South Africa

== Succession table ==
Catholic Church titles
Preceded by William Matthew Slattery (17 November 1993 - 23 December 2010)	Bishop of Kokstad (6 May 2013 - 1 Apr 2020)	Succeeded by Thulani Victor Mbuyisa (since 6 April 2022)
Preceded by Jabulani Adatus Nxumalo (10 October 2005 - 1 April 2020)	Archbishop of Bloemfontein (since 1 April 2020)	Succeeded by Incumbent
