= Southern African Catholic Bishops' Conference =

Assembly of Catholic bishops of South Africa, Botswana, and Eswatini

The Southern African Catholic Bishops' Conference (SACBC) is an episcopal conference consisting of all the bishops of the Roman Catholic Church in South Africa, Botswana, and Eswatini, and their equivalents under canon law (apostolic vicars, apostolic administrators, etc.). Founded in March 1947, it is a collegial body approved by the Holy See and has as its particular aim:

to provide the bishops of the territories mentioned above with facilities for consultation and united action in such matters of common interest to the Church as consultation and co-operation with other hierarchies; the fostering of priestly and religious vocations; the doctrinal, apostolic and pastoral formation of the clergy, religious and laity; the promotion of missionary activity, catechetics, liturgy, lay apostolate, ecumenism, development, justice and reconciliation, social welfare, schools, hospitals, the apostolate of the press, radio, television, and other means of social communication; and any other necessary activity.

In recent times, the Conference's application of the revision of the English translation of the Mass liturgy has been criticized as premature.

== Organization ==
The conference is led by a president and two vice presidents, each elected by an absolute majority of the members for three year terms. The members also elect chairmen and vice-chairmen for the departments of the conference. All office holders must be diocesan ordinaries; coadjutor bishops, auxiliary bishops, and bishops emeriti may not be elected. The president, vice presidents, department chairmen, and any Cardinals who do not hold a conference office form an administrative board which coordinates the conference's activities between its plenary sessions.

The Conference mandates a Secretariat to Coordinate Conference activities. The Secretariat is made up of Departments (such as the Justice and Peace department), Offices (such as the AIDS Office) and Associate Bodies (such as the Denis Hurley Peace Institute (DHPI). It has a 51% share in the Catholic weekly newspaper (since 2020 monthly magazine), "The Southern Cross".

== Presidents ==
President	Period
Archbishop Denis Hurley	1952–1961
Archbishop (later Cardinal) Owen McCann	1961–1974
Archbishop Joseph Fitzgerald	1974–1981
Archbishop Denis Hurley	1981–1987
Bishop Reginald Orsmond	1987–1988
Bishop (later Archbishop) Wilfrid Napier	1988–1994
Bishop Louis Ndlovu	1994–2003
Cardinal Wilfrid Napier	2003–2006
Archbishop Buti Joseph Tlhagale	2007–2013
Archbishop (later Cardinal) Stephen Brislin	2013–2019
Bishop (later Archbishop-Elect) Sithembele Anton Sipuka	since 2019

== See also ==
- Catholic Church in Africa
