= Archdiocese of Bloemfontein =

Latin Catholic archdiocese in South Africa

Coordinates: 29.1000°S 26.2167°E

Archdiocese of Bloemfontein Archidioecesis Bloemfonteinensis

Location
- Country: South Africa

Statistics
- Area: 64,393 km^{2} (24,862 sq mi)
- Population: Total; Catholics: 1,425,000; 116,700 (18.2%)

Information
- Denomination: Catholic Church
- Sui iuris church: Latin Church
- Rite: Roman Rite
- Cathedral: Sacred Heart Cathedral

Current leadership
- Pope: Leo XIV
- Archbishop: Zolile Peter Mpambani, S.C.I.
- Bishops emeritus: Jabulani Adatus Nxumalo, O.M.I.

The Archdiocese of Bloemfontein (Latin: Bloemfonteinen(sis)) is the metropolitan see for the ecclesiastical province of Bloemfontein in South Africa.

== History ==
- 1951.01.11: Established as Metropolitan Archdiocese of Bloemfontein from the Apostolic Vicariate of Aliwal and the Apostolic Vicariate of Kimberley in South Africa.

== Special churches ==
The seat of the archbishop is Sacred Heart Cathedral, Bloemfontein.

== Metropolitan Archbishops ==
- Herman Joseph Meysing, O.M.I. (1951.01.11 – 1954)
- William Patrick Whelan, O.M.I. (1954.07.18 – 1966.01.10)
- Joseph Patrick Fitzgerald, O.M.I. (1966.08.06 – 1976.01.24), appointed Archbishop (personal title) of Johannesburg
- Peter Fanyana John Butelezi, O.M.I. (1978.04.27 – 1997.06.10)
- Buti Joseph Tlhagale, O.M.I. (2 January 1999 – 8 April 2003), appointed Archbishop (personal title) of Johannesburg
- Jabulani Adatus Nxumalo, O.M.I. (10 October 2005 – 1 April 2020)
- Zolile Peter Mpambani, S.C.I. (1 April 2020 – present)

== Suffragan Dioceses ==
- Bethlehem
- Keimoes–Upington
- Kimberley
- Kroonstad

== See also ==
- Catholic Church in South Africa
- List of Catholic dioceses in South Africa, Botswana, and Swaziland
