= Catholic Church in South Africa =

The Catholic Church in South Africa is part of the worldwide Catholic Church, which is composed of the Latin Church and 23 Eastern Catholic Churches. The South African church is under the spiritual leadership of the Southern African Catholic Bishops Conference and the pope in Rome. It is made up of 26 dioceses and archdioceses plus an apostolic vicariate.

In 1996, there were approximately 3.3 million Catholics in South Africa, making up 6% of the total South African population. In 2016 there were 3.8 million Catholics. 2.7 million are of various black African ethnic groups, such as Zulu, Xhosa, and Sotho. Coloured and white South Africans each account for roughly 300,000.

Catholic evangelisation efforts have traditionally focused on Black South Africans. In the 1950s, however, an effort began to evangelise Afrikaans-speakers, who had previously been ignored by Catholic missionaries. Success in the Afrikaans Apostolate remained minimal until the death throes of apartheid during the mid- to late 1980s. As Catholic texts began to be translated into Afrikaans, sympathetic Dutch Reformed pastors, who were defying the traditional anti-Catholicism of their Church, assisted in correcting linguistic errors. By 1996, the majority of Afrikaans-speaking Catholics came from the Coloured community, with a smaller number of Afrikaner converts, most of whom were from professional backgrounds.

Most White South African Catholics are English-speakers, and the majority are descended from Irish immigrants. Many others are Portuguese South Africans, many of whom emigrated from Angola and Mozambique after these countries became independent and disintegrated into civil war during the 1970s. Others are descended from immigrants from other European countries, such as South Africa's Italian community. The proportion of Catholics among the predominantly Calvinist white Afrikaans speakers, or Asian South Africans who are mainly Hindus or Protestant of Indian descent, is extremely small.

== Organisation ==
=== Jurisdictions ===
The Catholic Church in South Africa consists of five Archdioceses (Bloemfontein, Cape Town, Durban, Johannesburg, and Pretoria), 22 Dioceses, 2 Vicariates Apostolic and a Military Ordinariate. The five Ecclesiastical provinces are:

- Bloemfontein
  - Leadership: Archbishop Zolile Peter Mpambani S.C.I., appointed 1 April 2020
  - Contains the following dioceses:
    - Bethlehem
      - Bishop Motlatsi Meshack Phomane, appointed 14 April 2026.
    - Keimoes-Upington – Upington, Northern Cape
      - Bishop-elect Enrico Valentino Parry, appointed 12 November 2026.
    - Kimberley
      - Bishop Duncan Theodore Tsoke, appointed 03 March 2021
    - Kroonstad
      - Bishop Amos Mabuti Masemola, appointed 17 February 2026.
- Cape Town
  - Leadership: Archbishop Sithembele Anton Sipuka, appointed 9 January 2026, and Auxiliary Bishop Sylvester Anthony John David OMI, appointed 6 June 2019
  - Contains the following dioceses:
    - Aliwal
      - Bishop Joseph Mary Kizito appointed 15 November 2019
    - De Aar
      - Bishop Adam Leszek Musiałek SCJ, appointed 17 July 2009.
    - Oudtshoorn
      - Bishop Noel Andrew Rucastle appointed 4 May 2020
    - Port Elizabeth
      - Bishop Vincent Mduduzi Zungu OFM, appointed 2 February 2014.
    - Queenstown
      - Siphiwo Devilliers Paul Vanqa SAC, appointed 3 March 2021
- Durban
  - Leadership: Archbishop Siegfried Mandla Jwara CMM, appointed 9 June 2021 and Auxiliary Bishop Elias Kwenzakufani Zondi, appointed 9 March 2023.
  - Contains the following dioceses:
    - Dundee
      - Bishop Graham Rose appointed 13 June 2008.
    - Eshowe
      - Vacant, following the transfer of Bishop Xolelo Thaddaeus Kumalo to the See of Witbank.
    - Kokstad
      - Bishop Thulani Victor Mbuyisa CMM, appointed 6 April 2022.
    - Mariannhill
      - Bishop Neil Augustine Frank OMI, appointed 17 December 2021.
    - Umtata
      - Vacant, following the transfer of Bishop Anton Sipuka to the See of Cape Town.
    - Umzimkulu
      - Bishop Stanisław Jan Dziuba, OSPPE appointed 31 December 2008.
    - Vicariate Apostolic of Ingwavuma
      - Bishop Vusumuzi Francis Mazibuko OMI, appointed 20 March 2023.
- Johannesburg
  - Leadership: Archbishop Stephen Cardinal Brislin appointed 28 October 2024.
  - Contains the following dioceses:
    - Klerksdorp
      - Bishop Victor Hlolo Phalana appointed 24 November 2014
    - Manzini (Geographically external to South Africa – In eSwatini)
      - Bishop José Luís Gerardo Ponce de León IMC appointed 29 November 2013.
    - Witbank
      - Bishop Xolelo Thaddaeus Kumalo appointed 25 November 2020.
- Pretoria
  - Archbishop Dabula Anthony Mpako appointed 30 April 2019 and Auxiliary Bishop Masilo John Selemela, appointed 16 July 2022.
  - Contains the following dioceses:
    - Gaborone (Geographically external to South Africa – In Botswana)
      - Bishop Frank Atese Nubuasah, SVD, appointed 6 June 2019.
    - Francistown (Geographically external to South Africa – In Botswana)
      - Bishop Lawrence Ofentse Pheto, appointed 10 April 2026.
    - Polokwane
      - Bishop Jeremiah Madimetja Masela appointed 10 June 2013.
    - Rustenburg
      - Bishop Robert Mogapi Mphiwe appointed 25 November 2020.
    - Tzaneen
      - Bishop Joao Rodrigues appointed 28 January 2010.
- Military Ordinariate of South Africa
  - Leadership: Archbishop Dabula Anthony Mpako appointed 30 April 2019.

=== Southern African Catholic Bishops Conference ===
The Southern African Catholic Bishops Conference is a collegial body approved by the Holy See and has as its stated aim:

to provide the bishops of the territories mentioned above with facilities for consultation and united action in such matters of common interest to the Church as consultation and co-operation with other hierarchies; the fostering of priestly and religious vocations; the doctrinal, apostolic and pastoral formation of the clergy, religious and laity; the promotion of missionary activity, catechetics, liturgy, lay apostolate, ecumenism, development, justice and reconciliation, social welfare, schools, hospitals, the apostolate of the press, radio, television, and other means of social communication; and any other necessary activity.

=== Apostolic Nuncio ===
Archbishop Henryk Mieczysław Jagodziński was appointed Apostolic Nuncio to South Africa on 16 April 2024, and also became the Apostolic Nuncio to Botswana, Lesotho, eSwatini and Namibia.

== Catholic Church and apartheid ==
Denis Hurley is Archbishop of Durban and a member of the Central Preparatory Committee of Vatican II. He was appointed bishop at the age of 31 and was a leader in opposing the apartheid regime. Many other officials within the Catholic Church in South Africa opposed apartheid, but a group of white Catholics formed the South African Catholic Defence League with the purposes of condemning the church's political involvement and, in particular, denouncing school integration.

== People ==
- Roy Campbell, South African poet, Catholic convert, and critic of Stalinism, Nazism, and Apartheid.
- Ernest Cole (photographer), South Africa's first black freelance photographer.
- Blessed Benedict Daswa, a Catholic convert from the Lemba people. First South African Blessed & Martyr
- Christopher Hope, South African journalist, playwright, and poet. In the memoir, White Boy Running, Hope relates his experiences coming from an Irish Catholic South African family, which dealt in different ways with the anti-Catholic face of Afrikaner nationalism.
- Denis Hurley, see above
- Anton Lembede, South African activist and founding president of the African National Congress Youth League (ANCYL).
- Owen McCann (1907–1994), President of the Southern African Catholic Bishops Conference (SACBC); South Africa's first cardinal.
- A. P. Mda, South African activist and founder member of both African National Congress Youth League and Pan Africanist Congress of Azania.
- Wilfrid Napier Cardinal, Archbishop emeritus of the Archdiocese of Durban
- Franz Pfanner, Trappist Abbot and candidate for Roman Catholic Sainthood
- Benedict Wallet Vilakazi, a linguist and Roman Catholic convert of royal descent from among the Zulu people. Also a radically innovative Zulu language poet, who combined the traditional Izibongo and other conventions of Zulu literature with both poetic meters and themes drawn from the European Romantic poetry of the 18th and early 19th centuries.

== Education ==
- Catholic schools in South Africa
- Catholic secondary schools in South Africa
- St Augustine College of South Africa

== In popular culture ==
- The Syringa Tree, an award-winning stage play by Pamela Gien, relates the life story of Elizabeth Grace, a White South African Catholic girl, during the Apartheid era and its aftermath.

== See also ==
- Religion in South Africa
- Christianity in South Africa
- Protestantism in South Africa
- Freedom of religion in South Africa

== Sources ==
- St Joseph's theological Institute (Cedara)
- Provides links to the structure and personnel history. Used heavily for diocesan and personnel information in the section on structure and leadership.
