= Reginald Cawcutt =

Roman Catholic prelate (1938–2022)

His Excellency Reginald Cawcutt
- Auxiliary Bishop of Cape Town
- Appointed: 29 May 1992
- Term ended: 17 July 2002
- Other post: Titular Bishop of Egabro (1992–2022)

Orders
- Ordination: 9 July 1962 by Owen McCann
- Consecration: 26 August 1992 by Lawrence Patrick Henry

Personal details
- Born: 25 October 1938 Rugby, South Africa
- Died: 22 March 2022 (aged 83) Cape Town, South Africa

Reginald Michael Cawcutt (25 October 1938 – 5 August 2022) was a South African Roman Catholic prelate.

Cawcutt was born in Rugby, Western Cape. His father, Wilfred, was a well-known horse trainer. He studied for the priesthood at St John Vianney Seminary in Pretoria and was ordained by Archbishop Owen McCann on 9 July 1962. Soon after his ordination, he became chaplain to the deaf community of Cape Town, serving in both of Cape Town's two Catholic institutions for the hearing-impaired. In 1966, he made a three-day pastoral visit to the remote island of Tristan de Cunha, where he administered the sacraments to the small Catholic community of 50, which rarely saw a priest. For many years he served as Catholic chaplain to the South African navy.

He served as auxiliary bishop of Egabro and as auxiliary bishop of the Archdiocese of Cape Town, South Africa, from 1992 until his retirement in 2002. As auxiliary bishop, he would live in Milnerton, a suburb on the Table Bay coast, near where he had been raised.

Cawcutt resigned in July 2002. This followed allegations that he had outed himself as gay on a sometimes-sexually charged website set up for gay priests. Cawcutt blamed the scandal on the conservative U.S.-based organization Roman Catholic Faithful, which had infiltrated the now closed website (which had been known as "St. Sebastian's Angels") and traced posting addresses. In his letter of resignation, Cawcutt stated that he did not wish to be a source of division in the Archdiocese.

Catholic Church titles
Preceded by —	Auxiliary Bishop of Cape Town; 1992–2002	Succeeded by —
Preceded by Hubert Luthe	Titular Bishop of Egabro; 1992–2022	Succeeded by Ramón Darío Valdivia Giménez 2023-
