= Edward Robert Adams =

South African Roman Catholic bishop (born 1934)

The Right Reverend Edward Robert Adams
- Bishop Emeritus of Oudtshoorn
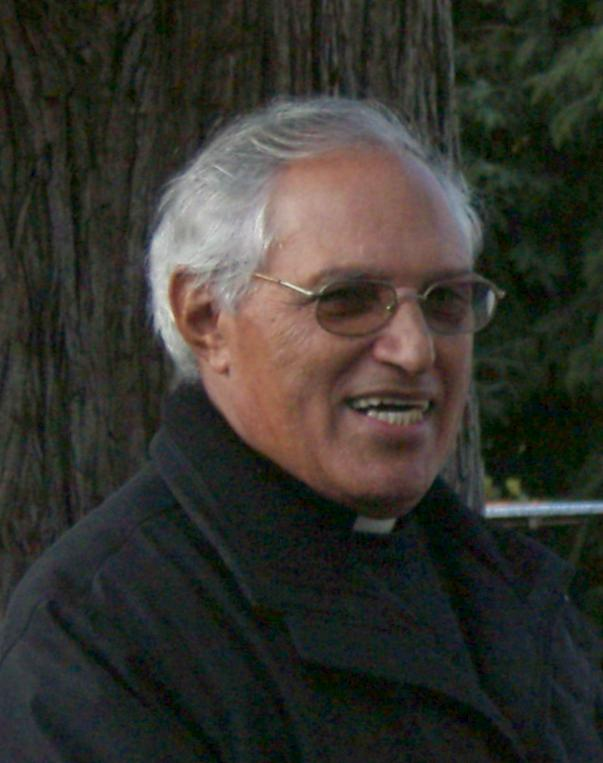
- Church: Roman Catholic Church
- Diocese: Oudtshoorn
- Appointed: 2 May 1983
- Installed: 16 July 1983
- Term ended: 28 May 2010
- Predecessor: Manfred Gottschalk
- Successor: Francisco Fortunato de Gouveia

Orders
- Ordination: 6 January 1966 by Pope Paul VI
- Consecration: 16 July 1983 by Owen McCann

Personal details
- Born: 24 May 1934 (age 92) Retreat, Cape Town, Union of South Africa
- Education: Pontifical Urban University

Edward Robert Adams (born 24 May 1934) is a South African Roman Catholic prelate who served as the third Bishop of Oudtshoorn from 1983 until his retirement in 2010. Following his retirement, he became bishop emeritus of the diocese.

== Biography ==
=== Early life and education ===
Adams was born on 24 May 1934 in Retreat, Cape Town, South Africa.

He made his seminary studies at the Urban College of Propaganda Fide in Rome, Italy, an institution associated with the formation of Catholic clergy and the Pontifical Urban University.

=== Priesthood ===
Adams was ordained a priest on 6 January 1966 for the Archdiocese of Cape Town by Pope Paul VI in Rome.

Before his episcopal appointment, he served as vicar general of the Archdiocese of Cape Town and parish priest of its cathedral.

=== Bishop of Oudtshoorn ===
On 2 May 1983, Pope John Paul II appointed Adams Bishop of Oudtshoorn, succeeding Manfred Gottschalk.

He was consecrated a bishop on 16 July 1983 at the Cathedral of St Saviour in Oudtshoorn, becoming the third bishop of the Diocese of Oudtshoorn. Adams headed the diocese for approximately 27 years, overseeing its pastoral administration and the Catholic community in the region.

=== Retirement ===
On 28 May 2010, Pope Benedict XVI accepted Adams's resignation from the pastoral governance of the Diocese of Oudtshoorn, in accordance with canon 401 §1 of the Code of Canon Law. He was succeeded by Francisco Fortunato de Gouveia, who was appointed bishop on the same day.

Following his retirement, Adams retained the title of Bishop Emeritus of Oudtshoorn.
