= Gerard Sithunywa Ndlovu =

- Roman Catholic Bishop emeritus of Umzimkulu
- Church: Cathedral of Our Lady of Lourdes
- Metropolis: Durban
- Diocese: Diocese of Umzimkulu
- Appointed: 22 December 1986
- Term ended: 22 August 1994
- Predecessor: Denis Eugene Hurley, OMI
- Successor: Wilfrid Fox Napier, OFM as administrator

Orders
- Ordination: 4 July 1970

Personal details
- Born: Gerard Sithunywa Ndlovu; March 11, 1939 Gobamahlambu, South Africa
- Died: March 13, 2013 (aged 74) Umzimkulu, South Africa
- Denomination: Roman Catholic
- Occupation: Bishop
- Profession: clergy

Gerard Sithunywa Ndlovu (March 11, 1939 – March 13, 2013) was the Roman Catholic bishop of the Diocese of Umzimkulu in South Africa.

Born in Gobamahlambu, Ndlovu was ordained to the priesthood on the 4 July 1970 and was named bishop on the 22 December 1984 by Pope John Paul II. He was ordained as Bishop of Umzimkulu on 25 April 1987 and on 22 August 1994 Ndlovu tendered his resignation for health reasons.

Emeritus Bishop Ndlovu died on 13 March 2013 in Umzimkulu.
