= Joseph James Potocnak =

American-born South African Roman Catholic bishop (born 1933)

His Excellency, The Most Reverend Joseph James Potocnak SCI
- Bishop Emeritus of De Aar
- Church: Catholic Church
- Diocese: De Aar
- Appointed: January 23, 1992
- Term ended: July 17, 2009
- Predecessor: Joseph Anthony De Palma
- Successor: Adam Leszek Musiałek

Orders
- Ordination: September 21, 1966
- Consecration: May 1, 1992 by Lawrence Patrick Henry

Personal details
- Born: Joseph James Potocnak; May 13, 1933 (age 93) Berwick, Pennsylvania, U.S.
- Education: University of Nevada

Joseph James Potocnak, SCI (born May 13, 1933) is an American-born South African Roman Catholic prelate who served as bishop of the Diocese of De Aar in South Africa from 1992 until his retirement in 2009. A member of the Priests of the Sacred Heart (Dehonians), he worked as a missionary in South Africa before being appointed bishop.

== Early life and education ==
Potocnak was born on May 13, 1933, in Berwick, Pennsylvania. Before entering religious life, he served for four years in the United States Air Force during the 1950s, including an 18-month posting on Kumejima Island in the East China Sea. Following his military service, he attended the University of Nevada before joining the Priests of the Sacred Heart.

He was ordained to the priesthood on September 21, 1966, as a member of the Priests of the Sacred Heart.

== Episcopal ministry ==
On January 23, 1992, Pope John Paul II appointed Potocnak bishop of De Aar. He received episcopal consecration on May 1, 1992, from Archbishop Lawrence Patrick Henry, with Bishops Everardus Antonius M. Baaij and Joseph Anthony De Palma serving as co-consecrators.

Potocnak served as bishop of De Aar until July 17, 2009, when Pope Benedict XVI accepted his resignation upon reaching the customary retirement age. He was succeeded by Adam Leszek Musiałek.

After his retirement, Potocnak returned to the United States, residing in Florida with the Priests of the Sacred Heart. He has continued to share reflections on his missionary vocation and episcopal ministry through interviews and public presentations.

== Recognition ==
In 2011, Potocnak celebrated the 50th anniversary of his religious profession as one of the jubilarians honored by the U.S. Province of the Priests of the Sacred Heart.

== See also ==
- Catholic Church in South Africa
- Roman Catholic Diocese of De Aar
