= Diocese of Port Elizabeth =

Diocese of Port Elizabeth may refer to:

- the Catholic Diocese of Port Elizabeth
- the Anglican Diocese of Port Elizabeth
