= Archdiocese of Cape Town =

Archdiocese of Cape Town may refer to:

- the Archdiocese of Cape Town (Catholic)
- the Anglican Diocese of Cape Town
