= Our Lady of Fatima Dominican Convent School =

Catholic girls' day school in Durban North

Coordinates: 29°47′01″S 31°02′11″E

Our Lady of Fatima Dominican Convent School is a Catholic girls' day school, in Durban North (eThekwini Metropolitan Municipality) . It was founded and is still supported by the Newcastle Dominican sisters. The school caters for girls from Gr 0 through to Gr 12. The school follows the IEB syllabus.

== History ==
The school was founded in 1953 by the Newcastle Dominican sisters. Archbishop Denis Hurley was inspired to open a Catholic girls' school in the north of Durban to expand the need in the community. He asked the Newcastle Dominican Sisters to assist with this task, as he had been educated by at St Dominic's School in Newcastle. The school was opened in 1954, and initially included boys in the primary school.
