= Lobinger =

Lobinger is a German surname. Notable people with the surname include:

- Fritz Lobinger (1929–2025), German missionary and Catholic bishop in South Africa
- Lex-Tyger Lobinger (born 1999), German footballer
- Petra Lobinger (born 1967), German triple jumper
- Tim Lobinger (1972–2023), German pole vaulter
