= Michael Gower Coleman =

- Bishop of Port Elizabeth
- Church: Catholic Church
- Diocese: Diocese of Port Elizabeth
- In office: 21 March 1986 – 20 August 2011
- Predecessor: John Patrick Murphy
- Successor: Vincent Mduduzi Zungu

Orders
- Ordination: 30 June 1963
- Consecration: 22 June 1986 by Stephen Naidoo

Personal details
- Born: 19 April 1939 Mafikeng, Cape Province, Union of South Africa
- Died: 17 December 2011 (aged 72)

Michael Gower Coleman (19 April 1939 – 17 December 2011) was the Roman Catholic bishop of the Roman Catholic Diocese of Port Elizabeth, South Africa.

Born in Mafeking in 1939. He was educated at Laerskool Zeerust, Transvaal and at Christian Brothers College in Kimberley. After working for a year in Zambia he entered St John Vianney Seminary, Pretoria as a student for the Diocese of Port Elizabeth at the invitation of Bishop Ernest Green. As well as his clerical training in the seminary, he also obtained a BA in Philosophy degree through the University of South Africa.

He was ordained to the priesthood in 1963. Coleman was named bishop of the Port Elizabeth diocese in 1986 resigning on 20 August 2011. The Right Reverend Gower died shortly after stepping down, on 17 December 2011.
