= Patrick Raymond Griffith =

Irish Dominican priest

Patrick Raymond Griffith OP
- Vicar Apostolic of Cape of Good Hope, Western District
- Church: Catholic Church
- See: Apostolic Vicariate of Cape of Good Hope, Western District
- In office: 30 July 1847 – 18 June 1862
- Predecessor: Vicariate erected
- Successor: Thomas Grimley
- Other post: Titular Bishop of Palaeopolis in Pamphylia (1837-1862)
- Previous post: Vicar Apostolic of Cape of Good Hope (1837-1847)

Orders
- Ordination: 1821
- Consecration: 24 August 1837 by Daniel Murray

Personal details
- Born: 15 October 1798 Limerick, County Limerick, Kingdom of Ireland, British Empire
- Died: 18 June 1862 (aged 63)

Patrick Raymond Griffith OP, (15 October 1798 – 18 June 1862) was an Irish Dominican priest, who served the Roman Catholic Archdiocese of Cape Town, South Africa. Rev. Patrick R. Griffith, who, in 1837 was consecrated the titular Bishop of Paleopolis, in the church of St. Andrew, Westland Row, Dublin where he was administrator, and was sent to Cape Town by Gregory XVI as the first Vicar Apostolic of Cape Colony. Dr Griffith became the first Catholic bishop in South Africa when the vicariate was elevated to a bishopric.

Dr. Griffith purchased the land on which St. Mary's Cathedral built and oversaw its development. Dr. Griffith died on 18 June 1862 in South Africa, and is buried in St. Mary's Cathedral. Bishop Griffith was succeeded as bishop by another Irishman, the Right Rev. Dr. Thomas Grimley.
