= Noel Andrew Rucastle =

South African Catholic prelate (born 1968

The Most Reverend Noel Andrew Rucastle
- Bishop of Oudtshoorn, South Africa
- Church: Catholic Church
- Archdiocese: Roman Catholic Archdiocese of Cape Town
- See: Diocese of Oudtshoorn
- Appointed: 4 May 2020
- Installed: 8 August 2020
- Predecessor: Francisco Fortunato de Gouveia
- Successor: Incumbent

Orders
- Ordination: 2 September 1974
- Consecration: 8 August 2020 by Stephen Brislin
- Rank: Bishop

Personal details
- Born: Noel Andrew Rucastle; 22 April 1968 (age 57) Kimberley, Diocese of Kimberley, Archdiocese of Bloemfontein, Northern Cape, South Africa
- Coat of arms

Styles of Noel Andrew Rucastle
- Reference style: Your Lordship; The Most Reverend
- Spoken style: His Lordship
- Religious style: Bishop

Noel Andrew Rucastle (born 22 April 1968) is a South African Catholic prelate who serves as the bishop of the Roman Catholic Diocese of Oudtshoorn, in South Africa. He was appointed to that position on 4 May 2020. Before that, from 14 July 2000 until 4 May 2020, he was a priest of the Catholic Archdiocese of Cape Town, South Africa. He was appointed bishop by Pope Francis. He was consecrated at Oudtshoorn on 8 August 2020 by Stephen Brislin, Archbishop of Cape Town.

== Background and education ==
Noel Andrew Rucastle was born on 22 April 1968 at Kimberley, Diocese of Kimberley, Archdiocese of Bloemfontein, Northern Cape, in South Africa. He studied at the Saint Patrick's Christian Brothers College in Kimberley. He then studied civil law at the University of the Free State, South Africa. In 1993 he was admitted to the Saint Francis Xavier Preparatory Seminary in Cape Town. He studied philosophy at Saint Peter's Major Seminary in Garsfontein, Gauteng from 1994 until 1995. He then studied theology at the Saint John Vianney National Major Seminary in Pretoria from 1996 until 1998. He continued with theological studies at the Cape Town Archiepiscopal Seminary. In 1999, he graduated with a Bachelor's degree from the Saint John's Theological Institute in Cedara, KwaZulu Natal. He studied at the Saint Paul University in Ottawa, Canada, from 2006 until 2010, graduating with a licentiate in canon law.

== Priest ==
He was ordained a priest for the Roman Catholic Archdiocese of Cape Town on 14 July 2000. He served as a priest until 4 May 2020. As a priest, he served in various roles and locations, including:

- Parish vicar of the Corpus Christi Parish in Wynberg, Cape Town from 2000 until 2003.
- Parish administrator of the Saint Anthony of Padua Parish in Kraaifontein from 2003 until 2006.
- Studies at Saint Paul University in Ottawa, Canada, leading to the award of a licentiate in canon law, from 2006 until 2010.
- Parish administrator of Saint Mary's Cathedral from 2010 until 2011.
- Judicial vicar of the archdiocese of Cape Town from 2011 until 2020.
- Parish priest of Saint Anthony's Parish in Hout Bay from 2012 until 2018.
- Parish priest of the Our Lady of Fatima Parish in Bellville, South Africa from 2019 until 2020.

== Bishop ==
On 4 May 2020, Pope Francis appointed Reverend Father Noel Andrew Rucastle, previously a member of the clergy of Cape Town, as the Bishop of the Diocese of Oudtshoorn, South Africa. He was consecrated at Oudtshoorn, on 8 August 2020 by the hands of Stephen Brislin, Archbishop of Cape Town assisted by Vincent Mduduzi Zungu, Bishop of Port Elizabeth and Edward Gabriel Risi, Bishop of Keimoes-Upington.

== See also ==
- Catholic Church in South Africa

== Succession table ==
Catholic Church titles
Preceded by Francisco Fortunato de Gouveia (28 May 2010 - 2 July 2018)	Bishop of Oudtshoorn (since 4 May 2020)	Succeeded by Incumbent
