= Fritz Lobinger =

German prelate of the Catholic Church (1929–2025)

- Bishop Emeritus of Aliwal
- Lobinger, c. 2000
- Church: Catholic Church
- Archdiocese: Cape Town
- Diocese: Aliwal
- Appointed: 18 November 1987
- Installed: 27 February 1988
- Term ended: 29 April 2004
- Predecessor: Everardus Antonius M. Baaij
- Successor: Michael Wuestenberg

Orders
- Ordination: 29 June 1955
- Consecration: 27 February 1988 by Wilfrid Napier

Personal details
- Born: 22 January 1929 Passau, Bavaria, Germany
- Died: 3 August 2025 (aged 96) Pretoria, South Africa
- Denomination: Roman Catholic
- Motto: Omnes autem vos fratres estis
- Coat of arms

Fritz Lobinger (German: [ˈfʁɪts ˈloːbɪŋɐ]; 22 January 1929 – 3 August 2025) was a German prelate of the Catholic Church who spent his career as a missionary in South Africa where, as head of the Lumko Missiological Institute, he developed the concepts of small Christian communities and Bible sharing. He was Bishop of Aliwal from 1987 to 2004. He advocated the ordination of teams of married men as priests to serve communities that otherwise lack regular access to the sacraments, with their functions designed to distinguish them from celibate priests. He is credited with shaping "a new vision of a participatory Church rooted in local culture and leadership."

== Life and career ==
Fritz Lobinger was born in Passau, Bavaria, on 22 January 1929 and grew up in Nabburg. He studied theology at Regensburg seminary, where he formed a friendship for life with Hubert Bucher and Oswald Georg Hirmer. He was ordained as a priest in Regensburg on 29 June 1955. The three friends volunteered to serve in South Africa. Lobinger spent one year as chaplain in the Marktleuthen parish. He arrived in Aliwal, South Africa, in 1956; Hirmer followed in 1957 and Bucher in 1958. The three would spend the rest of their lives in South Africa and all become bishops, Lobinger in Aliwal, Bucher in Bethlehem in 1977, and Hirmer in Mthatha in 1997. Lobinger learned Xhosa and engaged in the community life, which earned him the honorary name umGcina (keeper).

Lobinger launched his extensive writing career in 1963, publishing with Hirmer as co-author Africa’s Way to Life, a catechism based on their experience of African culture and designed for the instruction of adult candidates for baptism. The two colleagues were also the first missionaries in more than a century to encourage the use of traditional Xhosa musical styles in creating church songs.

From 1970 to 1986, Lobinger was head of the Lumko Missiological Institute, the Pastoral Institute of the Episcopal Conference for the implementation of Second Vatican Council in South Africa. (Note: Lumko was the name of the family that sold the property where the Institute was established in 1962. It began as an initiative of the Diocese of Queenstown under Bishop John Baptist Rosenthal, and its original isolated location 13 kilometers east of Lady Frere in Cape Province is thought to have contributed to its production of written materials. It was eventually taken over by the Southern African Catholic Bishops Conference. The Institute relocated in 1985 to Germiston, near Johannesburg.) Lobinger's early interest was in developing a system of "trainer catechists" to develop lay leadership, recognizing that a catechist plays a far greater role in the local community than his title suggests. Lobinger found models of lay engagement in Anglican and Methodist parishes. He visited Brazil several times to study the work of education theorist Paolo Freire. He produced training materials and led training sessions throughout South Africa. At Lumko, Lobinger contributed significantly to the development of the pastoral model of small Christian communities, including the model of Bible sharing, a method of Bible study that has implications for liturgical ministry, catechesis, social projects, and the institution of the local church. He collaborate at the institute with Hirmer and Bucher on the development of pastoral outreach programs.

He completed his doctorate in theology from the University of Münster in 1986, with a dissertation about the role of catechists, supervised by Adolf Exeler. On 18 November 1987, Pope John Paul II appointed him Bishop of the Diocese of Aliwal. He received his episcopal consecration on 27 February 1988 from Wilfrid Fox Napier, Archbishop of Durban. His motto was Omnes autem vos fratres estis (But all of you are brothers and sisters). A bishop, he supported translation from Xhosa and inculturation, small Christian communities, the training of lay leaders in workshops, and women and youth as "agents of change". He was committed to fighting apartheid and its racial injustice, and after apartheid called for educating voters. The diocese ran community development schemes such as housing for poor families and help for AIDS patients. Diocesan pastoral councils also including laypeople gave local churches participatory governance.

John Paul II accepted his resignation for reasons of age on 29 April 2004. Lobinger had to wait for three years until his successor, Michael Wüstenberg, was ordained as bishop in 2007.

=== Personal life ===
Lobinger was physically active as a swimmer, climber and windsurfer. In retirement Lobinger lived in a nursing home for priests in Mariannhill, a suburb of Durban, the headquarters of the Congregation of Mariannhill Missionaries, along with Bucher and Hirmer until their deaths in 2008 and 2011 respectively, . His last residence was a nursing home in Pretoria.

Lobinger died in Pretoria on 3 August 2025, at the age of 96.

=== Pastoral theory ===
Working as missionaries, Lobinger and his colleagues at Lumko became advocates of inculturation to promote evangelisation in a non-European context. They experimented with and documented ways of engaging parishioners in church life. Confronted with the shortage of priests, Lobinger advocated the creation of a new type of Catholic priesthood. He did not advocate the ordination of married men as peers of celibate priests. Instead he argued for the ordination of groups of married men, respected community elders, playing no role outside their local community. He also believed that the presence of these teams of married elders would enhance the laity's image of the celibate priesthood.

Speaking with journalists in January 2019, Pope Francis provided an outline of Lobinger's views as presented in his book Priests for Tomorrow. He called Lobinger's proposals "interesting" and "a matter for discussion among theologians", while repeating his own insistence on maintaining celibacy as general practice while considering the ordination of married men to serve linguistic minorities and geographically remote communities. Francis also interpreted Lobinger to mean that the elders would enjoy only one of the three gifts conferred by ordination, leading prayer and celebrating the sacraments, but without the other ministries of teaching and governing. Lobinger objected that this interpretation diminishes the role of the elders in a way he did not intend, but allowed that "this is a time of moving into new territory and one must find a way".

=== Writings ===
- Katechisten als Gemeindeleiter, Dauereinrichtung oder Übergangslösung? (in German). Münsterschwarzach: Vier-Türme-Verlag. 1973. ISBN 978-3-87868-053-6. (Dissertation at the University of Münster Faculty of Catholic Theology, 1971)
- With Adolf Exeler und Heinrich Aertker: Auf eigenen Füßen: Kirche in Afrika (in German). Düsseldorf: Patmos. 1986. ISBN 978-3-491-77440-7.
- Gemeinsam Verantwortung tragen – Pfarrgemeinderat (in German). Munich: Missio. 1988. ISBN 978-3-921626-83-2.
- Katechisten als Gemeindeleiter. Dauereinrichtung oder Übergangslösung? (in German). Münsterschwarzach: Vier-Türme-Verlag. 1997. ISBN 978-3-87868-053-6.
- Wie Gemeinden Priester finden (in German). Graz, Wien: Zeitpunkt. 1998. ISBN 978-3-901908-06-4.
- Like his Brothers and Sisters: Ordaining Community Leaders. New York: Crossroad Publishing Company. 1999. ISBN 978-0-8245-1850-9.
- With Paul M. Zulehner: Um der Menschen und der Gemeinden willen: Plädoyer zur Entlastung von Priestern (in German). Ostfildern: Schwabenverlag. 2002. ISBN 978-3-7966-1082-0.
- With Paul M. Zulehner und Peter Neuner: Leutepriester in lebendigen Gemeinden. Ein Plädoyer für gemeindliche Presbyterien (in German). Ostfildern: Schwabenverlag. 2003. ISBN 978-3-7966-1124-7.
- Priests for Tomorrow. Quezon City, Philippines: Claretian Publications. 2004. ISBN 978-971-501-983-5.
- Every Community its own Ordained. Quezon City, Philippines: Claretian Publications. 2008. ISBN 978-971-0511-27-3.
- Teams of Elders. Quezon City, Philippines: Claretian Publications. 2008. ISBN 978-971-0307-92-0.
- The Empty Altar: An Illustrated Book to Help Talk about the Lack of Parish Priests. Crossroad Publishing Company. 2017. ISBN 978-0-8245-2079-3.

== Notes ==
Catholic Church titles
Preceded by Everardus Antonius M. Baaij	Bishop of Aliwal; 1987–2004	Succeeded by Michael Wuestenberg
