= Joseph Kizito (bishop) =

Ugandan Catholic prelate

The Most Reverend Joseph Kizito
- Bishop of Aliwal
- Church: Roman Catholic Church
- Archdiocese: Cape Town
- Diocese: Aliwal
- Predecessor: Michael Wüstenberg

Orders
- Ordination: 27 September 1997
- Consecration: 15 February 2020 by Stephen Brislin
- Rank: Bishop

Personal details
- Born: Joseph Kizito; 2 July 1967 (age 59) Kampala, Uganda
- Motto: "Love One Another"

Styles of Joseph Kizito
- Reference style: His Lordship
- Spoken style: Your Lordship

Joseph Kizito (born 2 July 1967) is a Ugandan Catholic prelate who has served as the bishop of the Roman Catholic Diocese of Aliwal since 15 November 2019. Before that, from 27 September 1997 until 15 November 2019, he served as a priest of the same Catholic see. He was appointed bishop by Pope Francis. He was consecrated at Aliwal North, on 15 February 2020 by Stephen Brislin, Archbishop of Cape Town.

== Biography ==
Kizito was born on 2 July 1967 in Kampala, Uganda. He studied Philosophy at St. Augustine's Major Seminary in Roma, Lesotho and Theology at St. John Vianney Seminary in Pretoria, South Africa. He was ordained a priest on 27 September 1997 in Aliwal. At the time he was appointed Bishop of Aliwal, he was the Vicar General and Parish Priest of Aliwal North Cathedral Parish. Father Kizito had also served as parish vicar of the Saint Francis Xavier parish (1997–1998); parish priest of Saint Augustine's parish in Rerecord (1998–2003); parish priest of Sterkspruit Catholic Church (2003–2013); vicar general of the diocese of Aliwal (since 2008) and parish priest of Aliwal Cathedral parish (since 2013).

== Episcopacy ==
On 15 November 2019, Pope Francis appointed Kizito, who was a Monsignor as Bishop of Aliwal Diocese in South Africa. He was consecrated by Archbishop Stephen Brislin with co-consecrators: Bishop Zolile Peter Mpambani of the Diocese of Kokstad and Bishop Michael Wüstenberg, Bishop Emeritus of Aliwal. He succeeded Michael Wüstenberg, who served as bishop of the diocese from 2007 until his resignation in 2017.

== See also ==
- Charles Martin Wamika
- Sanctus Lino Wanok
- Raphael p'Mony Wokorach
- Joseph Anthony Zziwa

Catholic Church titles
Preceded by Michael Wuestenberg (2007 - 2017)	Bishop of Aliwal; 2019 -	Succeeded by Incumbent
