= Birmingham Oratory =

Catholic church in England

Coordinates: 52.4722°N 1.9288°W

- The Oratory of St. Philip Neri in Birmingham; Church of the Immaculate Conception
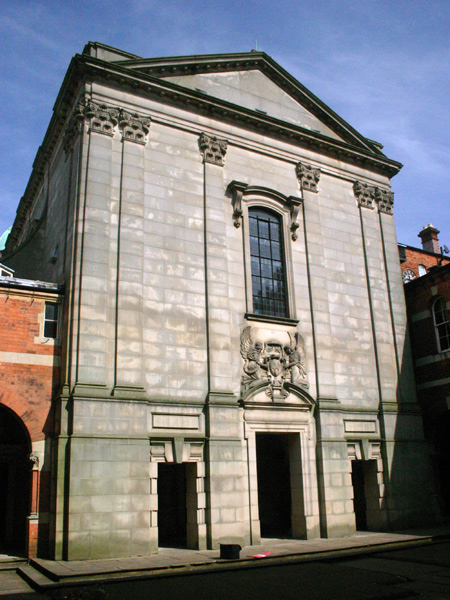
- Birmingham Oratory
- OS grid reference: SP 04921 86058
- Location: Birmingham
- Country: England
- Denomination: Catholic Church
- Website: https://birminghamoratory.org.uk/

History
- Founder: St. John Henry Newman C.O.
- Dedication: Immaculate Conception

Architecture
- Architect: Edward Doran Webb
- Style: Baroque
- Groundbreaking: 1850 (original), 1907 (current)
- Completed: 1852 (original), 1910 (current)

Administration
- Province: Birmingham
- Diocese: Birmingham

Clergy
- Rector: Rev. Fr. Anton Guziel C.O.
- Priest(s): Rev. Fr. Guy Nicholls C.O. Rev. Fr. Richard Duncan C.O. Rev. Fr. Dominic Edwards C.O. Rev. Fr. David Sprong C.O.

The Birmingham Oratory is a Roman Catholic religious community of the Oratory of St. Philip Neri, located in the Edgbaston area of Birmingham. The community was founded in 1849 by John Henry Newman as the first house of that congregation in England.

Part of the complex of the Oratory is the Parish Church of the Immaculate Conception, commonly referred to as the Oratory Church. It now also serves as the national shrine to Newman.

== History ==
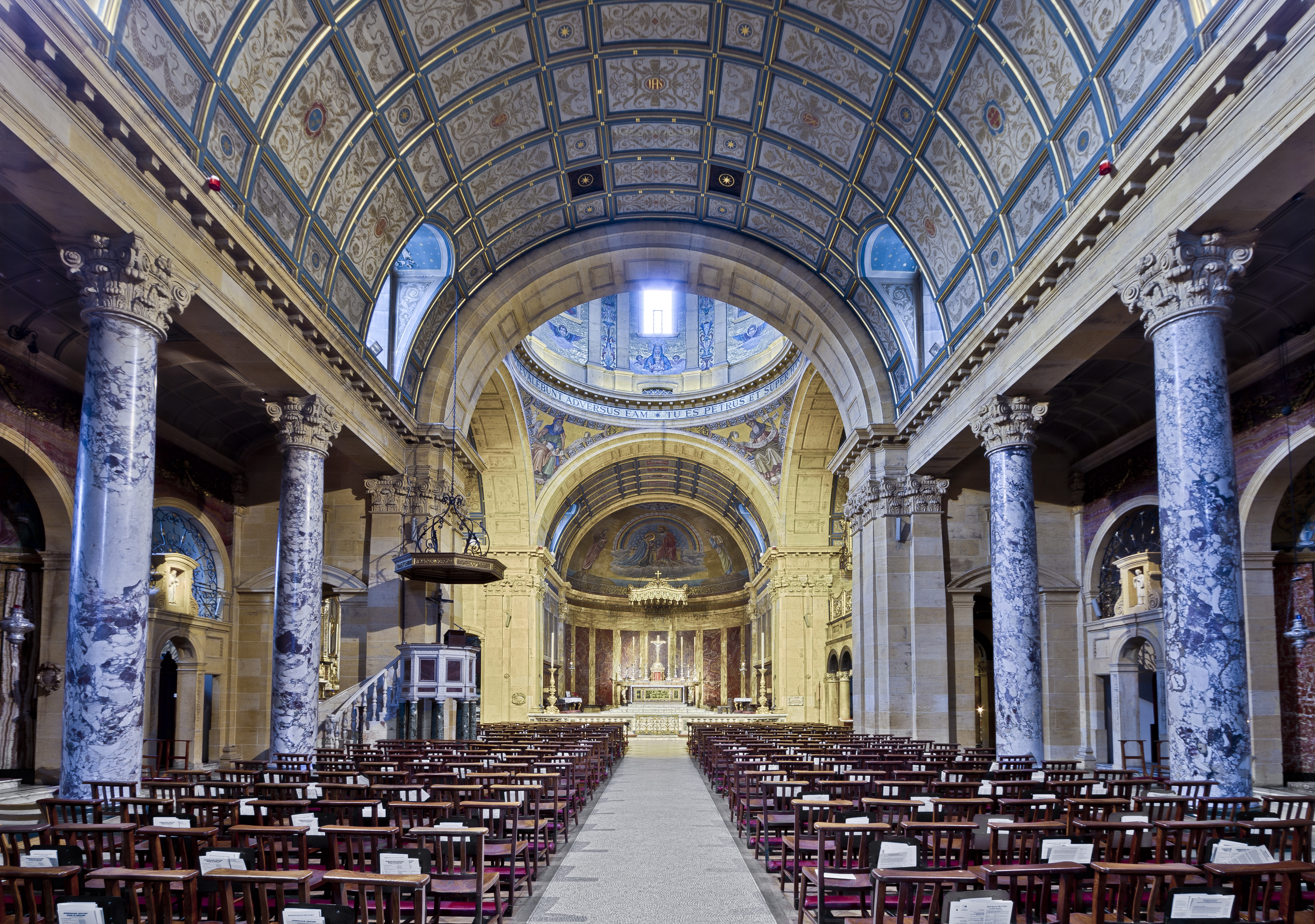
The nave of the Oratory church

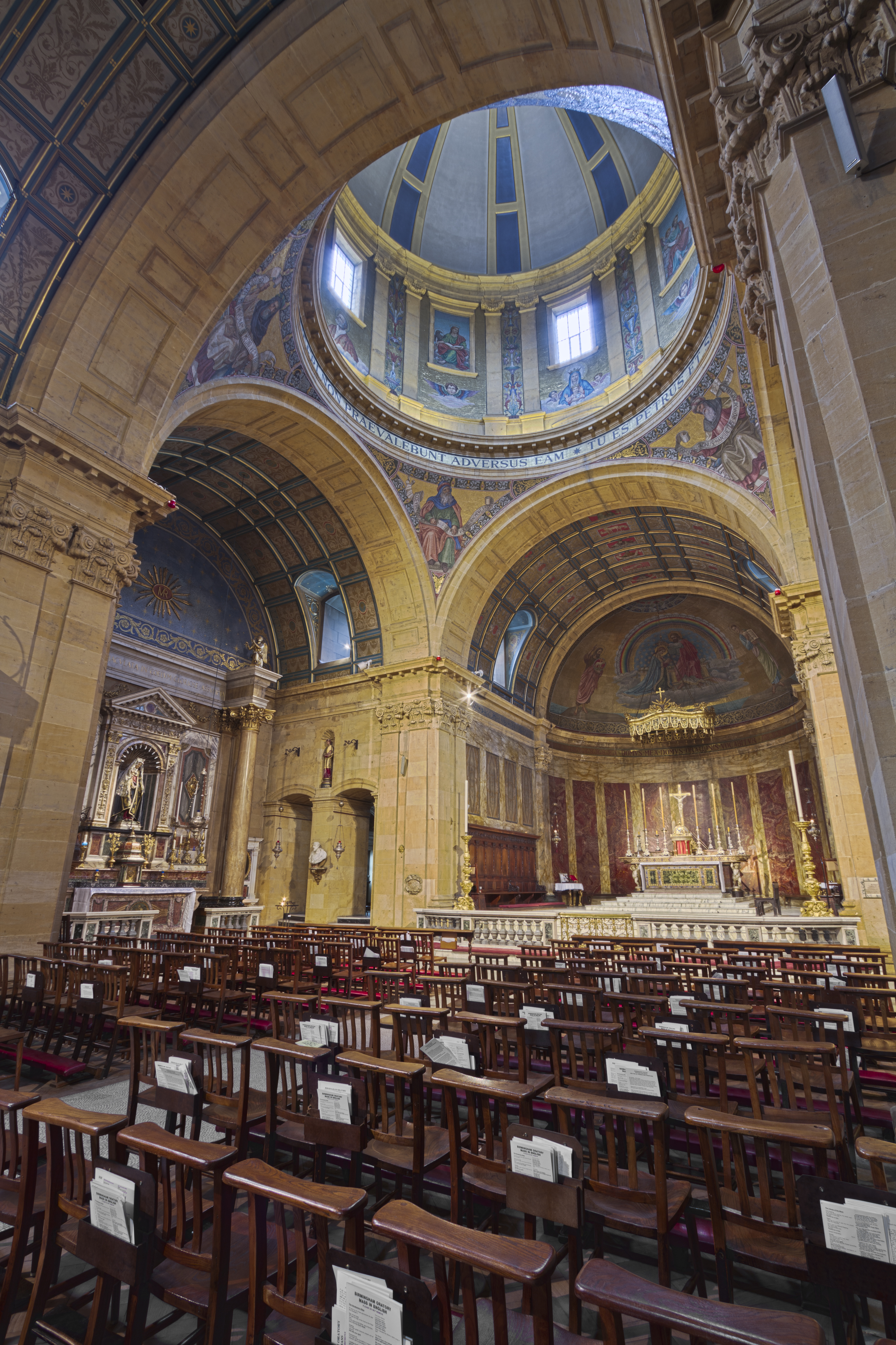
The altar of the Oratory church

Saint John Henry Newman, the founder of the Birmingham Oratory, after his conversion to the Catholic Church was seeking a way of life to live out his vocation. In common with a colleague from the Oxford Movement and fellow convert, Frederick William Faber, he had felt drawn to the way of life of the community founded by St. Philip Neri in Italy in the 16th century. When Newman went to Rome in 1845 to become a Catholic priest, he was authorised by Pope Pius IX to establish a community of the Oratory in England.

Returning to England in 1847, Newman gathered a small community of his followers who also wished to live this life. They initially found a home in Birmingham at the Church of St. Anne on Alcester Street, which became the first house of an Oratorian community in England in 1849. A more suitable location was eventually located in Birmingham, and construction was begun of a residence and church. The Oratorian community relocated there in 1852. It became a parish church for the local area and has served the congregation in various ways through the decades.

Upon the second death within the Oratorian community, Newman realised that they needed a cemetery. Through a donation given to him by the Catholic population of New York City in a show of support, he had been able to acquire property in the rural location of Rednal, where the community established a cemetery for the deceased of the congregation and also built a small summer house.

=== Music ===
The Oratory has a heritage of the promotion of great music in its worship. This goes back to its founder, St. Philip Neri, who believed strongly in the power of music for bringing out the good in people. The original Oratory in Rome was one of the great centres of sacred music for the city. The most celebrated singers and composers of the day would perform there. From this heritage comes the word oratorio. Right from its founding, the Birmingham Oratory has been noted for the high level of its music, due largely to the active interest of Newman himself. The parish continues to provide services which use the music of Palestrina, William Byrd, Tomás Luis de Victoria, Haydn, Mozart, as well as modern composers.

=== Education ===
Newman also founded the Oratory School there in 1859, as a Catholic alternative to Eton College. It relocated to near Reading in 1922. In 1887 two priests of the Oratory took over an existing school intended to provide an education to the poor Catholic boys of the area. This became St. Philip's School, which operated until 1995.

=== Current church ===
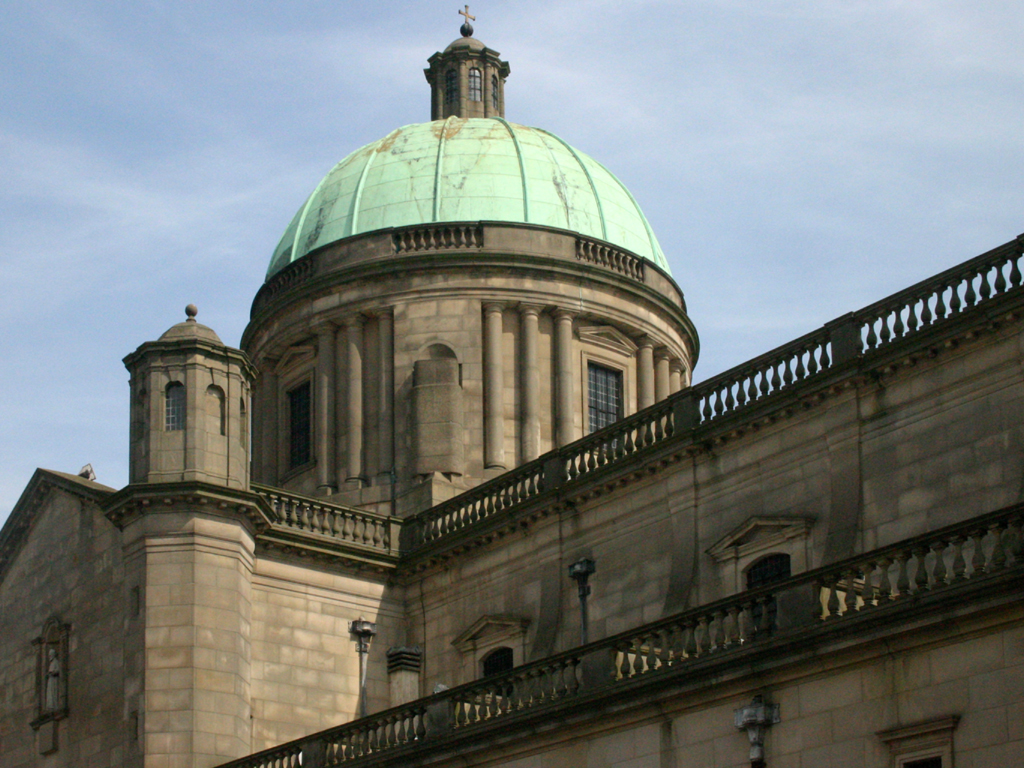
The dome of the Oratory church

The current church was constructed between 1907 and 1910 in the Baroque style to replace the original structure as a memorial to Newman. It was designed by the architect Edward Doran Webb. The chapel to the north-east containing the shrine of St Philip was designed by the architect George Bernard Cox and added in 1927.

Prior to a final determination regarding the beatification of Newman, the Holy See gave instructions that his remains were to be transferred from the Oratorian cemetery in the West Midlands to the Oratory Church. A marble tomb was constructed to receive them, but not installed in the church. When the church and civil authorities opened the grave in October 2008, they found no human remains.

The Grade II* listed church continues to serve the Congregation of the Oratory there. Elsewhere in England, there are also communities of the Congregation at the Brompton Oratory in London and the York Oratory.

In February 2012, the church suffered the theft of a large metal cross from its roof. The loss was valued at £30,000.

== Tolkien and the Oratory ==
The Birmingham Oratory was to play a major role in the life of J. R. R. Tolkien, the author of The Lord of the Rings, who was a parishioner there for about nine years during his childhood.

After the unexpected death of their father in South Africa, their mother, Mabel Suffield Tolkien, began to seek a spiritual home where she could find support in her struggle as a widow and single mother of little financial means. Fifty years after the establishment of the Oratorian community there, she started to attend the Church of St. Anne. The family was received into the Catholic Church in the spring of 1900, provoking opposition from the Tolkien family as well as her own.

A small gift from a relative enabled the young Ronald Tolkien (as he was called by his family) to enroll in the prestigious King Edward's School in Birmingham. This required the family to relocate. Not finding the spiritual support she needed in the local Catholic parish there, Mabel Tolkien began to take her two boys on long walks into the country on Sundays. Through these she came to know the Oratory, and found a friend in the community in the person of Fr. Francis Xavier Morgan, Cong.Orat.

The young Ronald had enrolled in the school without having been given a scholarship, and the tuition and fees weighed heavily upon the family income. When Father Morgan became aware of this, he made arrangements for the boy to transfer to the St. Philip's School. That, along with tutoring by his mother at home, allowed Ronald to gain a scholarship and to return to King Edward's School.

When Mabel Tolkien's health began to decline as a result of diabetes, Francis Morgan used his personal income to provide a home for the family in the vicinity of their rural house. Fearing that their relations might force the boys to give up their Catholic faith, Mabel Tolkien arranged for Father Morgan to be their legal guardian after her death, which occurred in 1904.

Morgan then supported the Tolkien boys out of his own pocket, paying Mabel's sister to house the boys. They found a real home, however, in the parish community of the Oratory, taking part in activities such as scouting there, which gave them an outlet for their youthful energies and companionship.

== Newman's beatification ==
The Oratory was visited by Pope Benedict XVI, immediately after the beatification Mass of John Henry Newman, which was held at Cofton Park in Birmingham on 19 September 2010. It was the first beatification ceremony ever held in England.

== Oratory House ==
The living quarters of the community is called the Oratory House (1850–51), fronting Hagley Road. Except for four years spent in Ireland, it served as Newman's home from 1852 to 1890. His personal papers are located here.

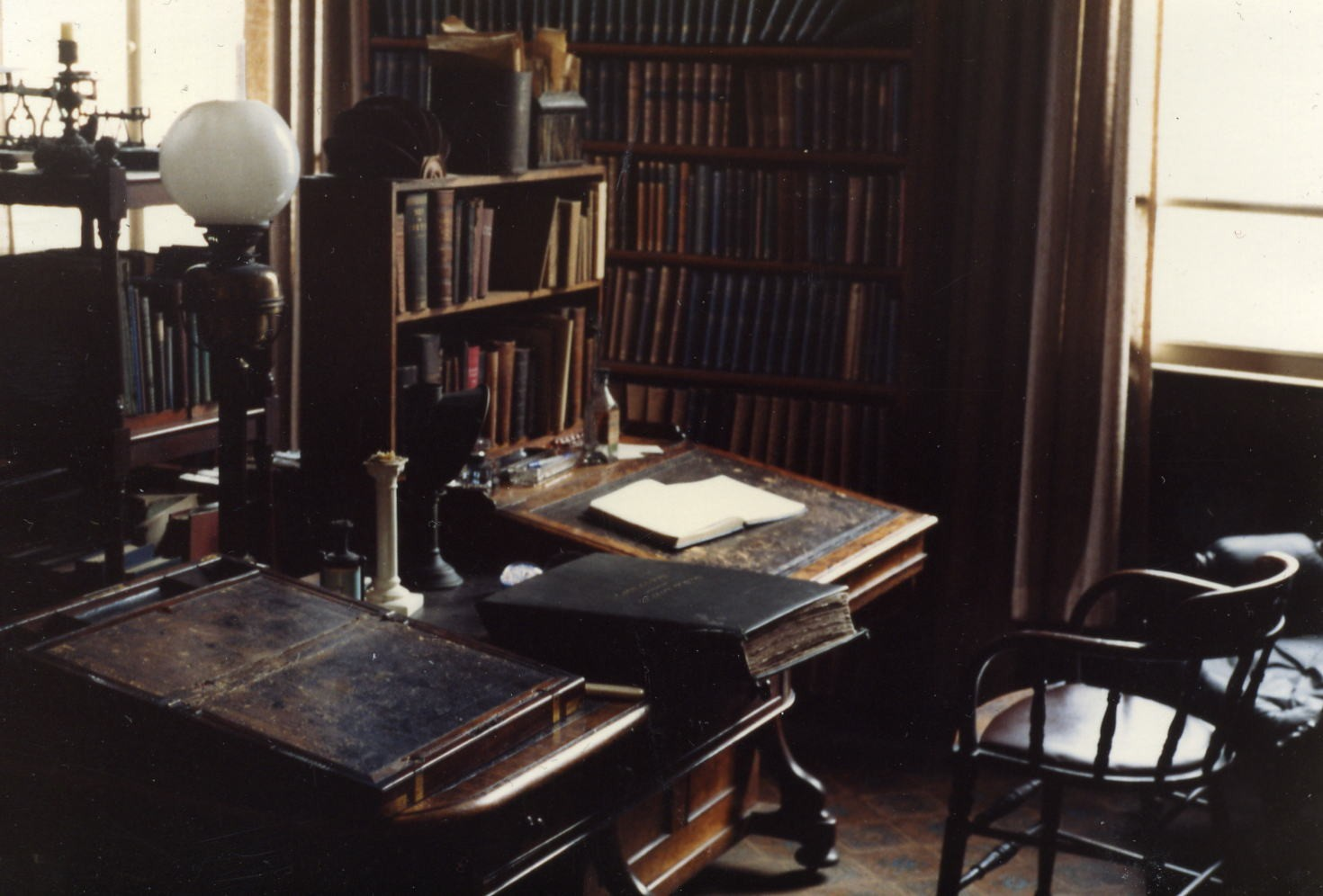
Cardinal Newman's desk in his room in Birmingham Oratory

== Organ ==
A short informational video on the Birmingham Oratory.

The organ dates from 1909 and was installed by Nicholson of Worcester. A specification of the organ can be found on the National Pipe Organ Register.

== Controversy ==
After a canonical visitation by the Holy See, in May 2010 the Rev'd Fr. Paul Chavasse, Cong.Orat., was removed from his position as Provost of the Oratory. This came after it was learned that he had entered a "close but chaste" relationship with a younger man. He had also served as the Postulator for the cause of Newman's canonisation.

Shortly thereafter, two priests and a lay brother were transferred from the Oratory. This is a highly unusual step, as the members of the Oratory make their commitment to a particular community, where they then spend their lives. The two priests were assigned to live in two different monasteries, while Bro. Lewis Berry, Cong.Orat., who was preparing for ordination, was sent to the Port Elizabeth Oratory, a newly founded Oratory in South Africa, for an indefinite period. The reason given for this was that the African Oratory would provide him "greater opportunities for a varied programme of pastoral work" needed for service as a deacon. This resulted in his not being present for Newman's beatification ceremony, although he had run the website of Newman's cause for canonisation. One of the priests, the Rev'd Fr. Dermot Fenlon, Cong.Orat., was reported to have exclaustration imposed on him, as he was unwilling to agree to his move.

The Birmingham Post reported that the three were popular with parishioners and that a campaign group, "Free The Birmingham Oratory Three", was formed. Berry, however, called upon the protests to stop, saying that he welcomed the move as providing new possibilities in his vocation.

In 2012 the Oratory paid an undisclosed sum to former director of music Nicholas Johnson after he was unfairly dismissed when the Oratory faced financial problems.
