= Diocese of De Aar =

Diocese of the Catholic Church in South Africa

Coordinates: 30°39′S 24°01′E

Diocese of De Aar Dioecesis De Aarensis

Location
- Country: South Africa
- Metropolitan: Cape Town

Statistics
- Area: 67,248 km^{2} (25,965 sq mi)
- Population: Total; Catholics: (as of 2004); 164,000; 5,620 (3.4%)

Information
- Rite: Latin Rite

Current leadership
- Pope: Leo XIV
- Bishop: Adam Musialek, S.C.I.

The Diocese of De Aar (Latin: De Aaren(sis)) is a Latin Catholic diocese located in the city of De Aar (Pixley ka Seme District Municipality) in the ecclesiastical province of Cape Town in South Africa.

== History ==
- March 24, 1953: Established as Apostolic Prefecture of De Aar from Diocese of Aliwal
- April 13, 1967: Promoted as Diocese of De Aar

== Special churches ==
- The cathedral is Cathedral of Our Lady of the Assumption in De Aar.

== Leadership ==
- Prefect Apostolic of De Aar (Roman rite)
  - Fr. Louis Dettmer (1953.03.24 – 1967.04.13)
- Bishops of De Aar (Roman rite)
  - Bishop Joseph Anthony De Palma, S.C.I. (1967.04.13 – 1987.11.18)
  - Bishop Joseph James Potocnak, S.C.I. (1992.01.23 - 2009.07.17)
  - Bishop Adam Leszek Musialek, S.C.I. (since 2009.07.17 - )

== See also ==
- Catholic Church in South Africa
- www.diocesedeaar.com
