= John Rooney =

John Rooney may refer to:

- John Rooney (baseball) (born 1997), American baseball player
- John Rooney (sportscaster) (born 1955), American sports announcer
- John Rooney (footballer) (born 1990), English footballer
- John Rooney (squash player) (born 1979), Irish squash player
- John Rooney (Irish politician), Irish Farmers's Party TD for Dublin County, 1922–1923
- John Rooney (murderer) (1880–1905), convicted American murderer and last person executed by North Dakota
- John E. Rooney (politician) (1939–2025), American politician from New Jersey
- John E. Rooney (businessman) (1942–2011), U.S. Cellular CEO
- John J. Rooney (politician) (1903–1975), American Democratic Party politician from New York
- John J. Rooney (judge) (1915–1998), American judge in Wyoming
- John Rooney (bishop) (1844–1927), Irish-born Roman Catholic bishop in South Africa
- JP Rooney (John Paul; born 1979), Gaelic footballer
