= Mammilla =

Mammilla may refer to:

- Mammilla (Africa), an ancient city and bishopric in Mauretania Caesariensis, now a Latin Catholic titular see
- Mammilla, anatomical Latin for a nipple
- Mammilla (gastropod), a genus of sea snails

== See also ==
- Mamilla, an old neighborhood in Jerusalem
- Mammillary body, a part of the brain
- Mammillary process, a tubercle on the lumbar vertebrae
- Mammillaria (disambiguation)
