= Archbishop of Cape Town =

Archbishop of Cape Town may refer to:

- Anglican Archbishop of Cape Town.
- Roman Catholic Archbishop of Cape Town.
