= Palaeopolis =

Palaeopolis, Palaiopolis, or Paleopolis (Ancient Greek: Παλαιόπολις, lit. 'old city'), rarely spelled Palaepolis (Παλαίπολις), can refer to the cities:

== in Italy ==
- the original site of the Greek colony in Italy that became Neapolis, now Naples

== in Turkey ==
- Palaeapolis (Caria), now in Turkey
- Palaeopolis (Lydia), now in Turkey
- Palaeopolis in Pamphylia, now Akören (in Adana province?) in Turkey
- Palaeopolis, the previous name of the Seleucia Pieria

== in Greece ==
- Palaiopoli, Andros, in the Cyclades Islands (Greece)
- Palaeopolis, a ruined ancient city on the Greek island of Samothrace in the northern Aegean Sea
- Palaeopolis, an ancient Greek settlement on a former island, later expanded on the mainland as Empúries, and the site of the modern village of Sant Martí d'Empúries, in modern Spain
- Palaeopolis, Corfu, within the estate of Mon Repos on the Ionian Island of Corfu
