= Franziskus Hennemann =

Franziskus Hennemann S.A.C.
- Vicar Apostolic of Cape Town
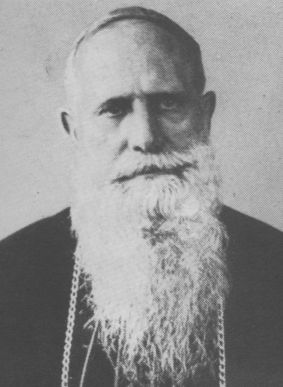
- Church: Catholic Church
- See: Vicariate Apostolic of Cape Town
- In office: 30 June 1933 – 12 November 1949
- Predecessor: Bernard Cornelius O'Riley
- Successor: Owen McCann
- Other post: Titular Bishop of Coptus (1913-1951)
- Previous posts: Prefect of Cape of Good Hope, Central District (1922-1933); Vicar Apostolic of Cameroun (1914-1922); Coadjutor Vicar Apostolic of Cameroun]]

Orders
- Ordination: 24 June 1907
- Consecration: 26 April 1914 by Heinrich Vieter

Personal details
- Born: Franziskus Xaver Hennemann; 27 October 1882 Holthausen, Province of Westphalia, Kingdom of Prussia, German Empire
- Died: 17 January 1951 (aged 68) Cape Town, Province of the Cape of Good Hope, Union of South Africa, British Empire

Franziskus Xaver Hennemann S.A.C. (27 October 1882 – 17 January 1951), was a Titular Bishop in South Africa.

== Biography ==
Franziskus Xaver Hennemann, also known as Francis Hennemann, was born in Germany in Holthausen (Schmallenberg). The son of a tradesman, he visited the school in Fredeburg (Schmallenberg). On 24 January 1907 he was ordained a priest for the Pallottines. On 16 July 1913 Pope Pius X appointed Hennemann Titular Bishop of Coptus and ordered him coadjutor of the seriously ill Vicar Apostolic of Cameroon, Heinrich Vieter. On 7 November 1914 he was appointed Vicar Apostolic of Roman Catholic Archdiocese of Yaoundé.

After all German missionaries were expelled from the former German colonies in Africa following World War I, Hennemann was sent to South Africa in 1922 to become the prefect of the Cape of Good Hope Central District Vicariate, which covers today’s Roman Catholic Diocese of Oudtshoorn. On 14 September 1922, the ship Wangani arrived in Cape Town harbour. Among the passengers were Hennemann and eight of his confreres.

In 1933 he was appointed Vicar Apostolic of the Cape of Good Hope Western District Vicariate, which later became the Roman Catholic Archdiocese of Cape Town. On 2 September 1948, Hennemann issued a letter, addressed to all the clergy of his diocese, in which he condemned the newly elected Nationalist government's apartheid policy as "noxious, unchristian and destructive".

Hennemann retired on 12 November 1949, and was succeeded by Bishop (later Archbishop and Cardinal) Owen McCann. He died at the age of 68 on 17 January 1951 in Cape Town and is buried in the St. Mary's Cathedral, Cape Town.

== Publications ==
=== Author ===
- Sieben Jahre Missionsarbeit in Kamerun, Zeitfragen aus der Weltmission, 1918
- Zwei Grundfragen afrikanischer Missionsarbeit, ZM 9, 1919
- Die religiösen Vorstellungen der heidnischen Bewohner Süd-Kameruns, Ehrengabe dt. Wiss., Franz Fessler (Hrsg.), 1920
- Werden und Wirken eines Afrikamissionars. Erlebtes und Erschautes., Pallottiner Verlag Limburg an der Lahn, 1922
