= Bernard Cornelius O'Riley =

South African Roman Catholic priest (1868-1956)

- Vicar Apostolic of Cape of Good Hope, Western District
- Church: Catholic Church
- See: Apostolic Vicariate of Cape of Good Hope, Western District
- In office: 15 July 1925 – 6 June 1932
- Predecessor: John Rooney
- Successor: Franziskus Hennemann
- Other post: Titular Bishop of Phoba (1925-1956)

Orders
- Ordination: 1 November 1890
- Consecration: 6 January 1926 by Hugh McSherry

Personal details
- Born: 10 February 1868 Cape Town, Cape Colony, British Empire
- Died: 28 July 1956 (aged 88)

Bernard Cornelius O'Riley (10 February 1868 in Cape Town, Cape Colony; † 28 July 1956) was a South African Roman Catholic priest and Apostolic Vicar of the Western Cape of Good Hope.

== Life ==
Bernard Cornelius O'Riley was ordained priest on 1 November 1890 for the Apostolic Vicariate of the Western Cape of Good Hope.

On 15 July 1925, Pope Pius XI appointed him Titular Bishop of Anastasiopolis and Apostolic Vicar of the Western Cape of Good Hope. The Apostolic Vicar of the Eastern Cape of Good Hope, Hugh McSherry, consecrated him Episcopalian on 6 January 1926 in St. Mary's Cathedral in Cape Town; co-consecrators were the Apostolic Vicar of Natal, Henri Delalle OMI, and the Apostolic Vicar of Transvaal, David O'Leary OMI.

On June 6, 1932, Pope Pius XI accepted the resignation of Bernard Cornelius O'Riley.
