= John Evangelist McBride =

John Evangelist McBride O.F.M.
- Bishop of Kokstad
- Church: Catholic Church
- Diocese: Diocese of Kokstad
- In office: 21 April 1949 – 15 May 1978
- Predecessor: Blaise Kurz
- Successor: Wilfrid Napier
- Other post: Titular Bishop of Aezani (1949-1951)

Orders
- Ordination: 3 July 1927
- Consecration: 25 July 1949 by John Charles McQuaid

Personal details
- Born: 12 March 1903 Beagh (northwest of Drumkeeran), County Leitrim, United Kingdom of Great Britain and Ireland
- Died: 12 February 1991 (aged 87) Dublin, Republic of Ireland

John Evangelist McBride, O.F.M. (12 March 1903 – 12 February 1992) was an Irish prelate of the Catholic Church who was bishop of the Apostolic Vicariate of Kokstad in South Africa from 1949 to 1951 and of the Diocese of Kokstad from 1951 to 1978. A member of the Franciscans, he was that order's provincial of Ireland before becoming a bishop.

== Biography ==
Johnny Kilbride was born on 12 March 1903 in Beagh, Killavoggy, Co. Leitrim. He attended national school locally before going to study at Multyfarnham, Mullingar, Co. Westmeath. He joined the Franciscans, taking the name "John Evangelist", and spent a year in the novitiate in Killarney, before proceeding to the Irish St Anthony's College, Leuven (Louvain), Belgium, where he obtained his doctorate in philosophy. He continued his studies in Rome, living at the St. Isidore's College and obtaining his doctor of divinity degree from the Pontifical Gregorian University. At some point he began using the surname McBride, which has a more gaelic sound than Kilbride.

McBride was ordained a priest in 1927. He served as provincial of the Irish Franciscans from 1942 to 1949 and founded the House of Studies in Killiney, Dublin, in 1945. While provincial, he twice visited Kokstad and other missions in South Africa. after the German Franciscans there appealed for help after being interned as enemy aliens during World War II.

Pope Pius XII appointed him bishop of the Apostolic Vicariate of Kokstad on 21 April 1949. He received his episcopal consecration on 25 July from Archbishop John Charles McQuaid and was installed in Kokstad on 29 September. He became the first diocesan bishop of Kokstad when it was elevated to the status of a diocese on 11 January 1951. He attended the Second Vatican Council.

He retired in June 1978 and he was succeeded by the Irish-trained Franciscan future cardinal Wilfrid Napier.

He died in Dublin on 12 February 1991.
