= Thomas Grimley =

South African Bishop

- Vicar Apostolic of Cape of Good Hope, Western District
- Church: Catholic Church
- See: Apostolic Vicariate of Cape of Good Hope, Western District
- In office: 18 June 1862 – 29 January 1871
- Predecessor: Patrick Raymond Griffith
- Successor: John Leonard
- Other post: Titular Bishop of Antigonea (1860-1871)
- Previous posts: Coadjutor Vicar Apostolic of Cape of Good Hope, Western District (1860-1862)

Orders
- Ordination: 6 June 1846
- Consecration: 25 January 1861 by Paul Cullen

Personal details
- Born: 21 December 1821 Skerries, County Dublin, United Kingdom of Great Britain and Ireland
- Died: 29 January 1871 (aged 49)

Thomas Grimley (1821–1871) was an Irish-born priest and educator who served as Bishop of Cape Town, South Africa.

Grimley was born in Skerries, County Dublin, in 1821. He was ordained in 1846 by Archbishop Paul Cullen and then worked as a curate at St Paul's, Arran Quay, Dublin.

In 1860 Grimley was ordained Titular Bishop of Antigonea and co-adjutor Bishop of Cape Town. In 1862 Vicar Apostolic of Cape of Good Hope, Western District, South Africa, succeeding Patrick Raymond Griffith OP, as bishop.

Grimley established many schools and churches in South Africa. The first school for the deaf was established in 1863 by the Irish Dominican order and Grimley and was known as the Dominican Grimley Institute for the Deaf.

Grimley attended the First Vatican Council in 1869.

He died in 1871. He was succeeded by another Irishman, John Leonard.
