= Diocese of Umzimkulu =

Roman Catholic diocese in South Africa

Coordinates: 30°35′S 29°53′E

Diocese of Umzimkulu Dioecesis Umzimkulensis

Location
- Country: South Africa
- Metropolitan: Durban

Statistics
- Area: 15,275 km^{2} (5,898 sq mi)
- Population: Total; Catholics: (as of 2004); 1,894,680; 141,363 (7.5%)

Information
- Rite: Latin Rite

Current leadership
- Pope: Leo XIV
- Bishop: Stanisław Jan Dziuba, OSPPE

The Roman Catholic Diocese of Umzimkulu (Latin: Umzimkulen(sis)) is a diocese centered at the city of Harding in the ecclesiastical province of Durban in South Africa. It comprises 15 parishes, each with 5-14 outstations - chapels served by missionaries.

== History ==
- February 21, 1954: Established as Diocese of Umzimkulu from the Diocese of Mariannhill

== Special churches ==
The Cathedral is the Cathedral of Our Lady of Lourdes in Harding.

== Leadership ==
  - Bishop Pius Bonaventura Dlamini, FFJ (1954.02.21 – 1967.12.14)
  - Fr. Peter Fanyana John Butelezi, OMI (1968 - 1972.07.30) Apostolic Administrator
  - Archbishop Denis Eugene Hurley, OMI (1972 - 1986) Apostolic Administrator
  - Bishop Gerard Sithunywa Ndlovu (1986.12.22 – 1994.08.22)
  - Archbishop Wilfrid Fox Napier, OFM (Cardinal in 2001) (1994.08.22 - 2008.12.31) Apostolic Administrator
  - Bishop Stanisław Jan Dziuba, O.S.P.P.E. (since 2008.12.31)

== See also ==
- Roman Catholicism in South Africa
