= Diocese of Oudtshoorn =

Latin Catholic diocese in South Africa

Coordinates: 33°35′10″S 22°12′16″E

Diocese of Oudtshoorn Dioecesis Oudtshoornensis

Location
- Country: South Africa
- Metropolitan: Cape Town

Statistics
- Area: 113,343 km^{2} (43,762 sq mi)
- Population: Total; Catholics: (as of 2004); 997,920; 26,344 (2.6%)

Information
- Sui iuris church: Latin Church
- Rite: Roman Rite

Current leadership
- Pope: Leo XIV
- Bishop: Noel Andrew Rucastle
- Bishops emeritus: Edward Robert Adams; Francisco Fortunato De Gouveia

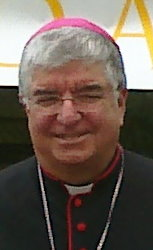
Bishop Francisco Fortunato De Gouveia

The Diocese of Oudtshoorn (Latin: Oudtshoornen(sis)) is a Latin Catholic diocese located in the city of Oudtshoorn in the ecclesiastical province of Cape Town in South Africa.

On 4 May 2020, Noel Andrew Rucastle, a priest of the Archdiocese of Cape Town, was appointed Bishop of Oudtshoorn.

== History ==
- 3 August 1874: Established as Apostolic Prefecture of Cape of Good Hope, Central District from the Apostolic Vicariate of Cape of Good Hope, Western District
- 13 June 1939: Renamed as Apostolic Prefecture of Oudtshoorn
- 9 December 1948: Promoted as Apostolic Vicariate of Oudtshoorn
- 11 January 1951: Promoted as Diocese of Oudtshoorn

== Special churches ==
- The cathedral is St. Saviour's Cathedral in Oudtshoorn.

== Leadership ==
- Prefects Apostolic of Cape of Good Hope, Central District (Latin Church)
  - Bishop Franziskus Hennemann (1922.06.26 – 1933.06.30), appointed Vicar Apostolic of Cape of Good Hope, Western District
  - Fr. Teodoro Koenig (1934.01.12 – 1939.06.13 see below)
- Prefect Apostolic of Oudtshoorn
  - Fr. Teodoro Koenig (see above 1939.06.13 – 1947)
- Vicar Apostolic of Oudtshoorn
  - Bishop Bruno-Augustin Hippel (1948.12.09 – 1951.01.11 see below)
- Bishops of Oudtshoorn
  - Bishop Bruno-Augustin Hippel (see above 1951.01.11 – 1968.10.02)
  - Bishop Manfred Gottschalk, S.A.C. (1969.03.06 – 1982.04.20)
  - Bishop Edward Robert Adams (1983.05.02 - 2010.05.28)
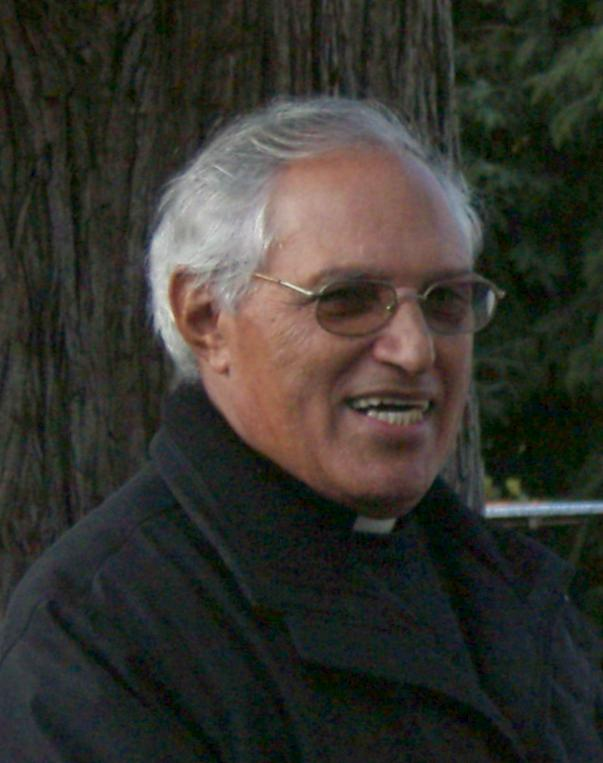
    Bishop Edward Robert Adams
  - Bishop Francisco Fortunato de Gouveia (appointed 2010.05.28 - retired 2 July 2018)
  - Bishop Noel Andrew Rucastle (appointed 4 May 2020 - )

== See also ==
- Catholic Church in South Africa

== Sources ==
- Website (Diocese of Oudtshoorn)
- GCatholic.org
- Catholic Hierarchy
