= Vincent Mduduzi Zungu =

Catholic bishop

- Bishop of Port Elizabeth
- Church: Roman Catholic Church
- See: Roman Catholic Diocese of Port Elizabeth
- In office: 2014—present
- Predecessor: Michael Gower Coleman
- Successor: vacant
- Previous post: Definitor General for Africa and the Middle East, Rome

Orders
- Ordination: July 8, 1995
- Consecration: June 28, 2014 by Archbishop Stephen Brislin

Personal details
- Born: April 28, 1966 Mbongolwane, KwaZulu-Natal, South Africa

Vincent Mduduzi Zungu (born April 28, 1966) is a South African Bishop of the Roman Catholic Church.

Zungu was born in Mbongolwane, KwaZulu-Natal, South Africa, on April 28, 1966. He studied philosophy and theology at the Major Seminary of St. John Vianney in Pretoria and entered the Franciscan Order on January 18, 1988. He later made his simple profession on January 19, 1989, and his solemn vows on July 2, 1994. He obtained a Licentiate in Moral Theology at the University of Strasbourg.

He was ordained a priest on July 8, 1995. On February 2, 2014, he was named Bishop of Port Elizabeth by Pope Francis.

He was ordained a bishop by Archbishop Stephen Brislin on 28 June 2014 at the Nelson Mandela Metropolitan University Missionvale Campus.
