= John Leonard (bishop) =

The Right Reverend John Leonard D.D.
- Vicar Apostolic of Cape of Good Hope, Western District
- Church: Catholic Church
- See: Apostolic Vicariate of Cape of Good Hope, Western District
- In office: 1 October 1872 – 19 February 1908
- Predecessor: Thomas Grimley
- Successor: John Rooney
- Other post: Titular Bishop of Corada (1872-1908)

Orders
- Ordination: 5 January 1855
- Consecration: 15 December 1872 by Paul Cullen

Personal details
- Born: 15 January 1829 Dublin, County Dublin, United Kingdom of Great Britain and Ireland
- Died: 19 February 1908 (aged 79) Cape Town, Cape Colony, British Empire

Right Rev. John Leonard, D.D., was an Irish born priest who served in Ireland and South Africa. Born in Dublin on 15 January 1829, he matriculated in St. Patrick's College, Maynooth in 1849. He was ordained a priest in 1855 by Archbishop of Dublin Paul Cullen. Dr. Leonard was curate at Blanchardstown, Co. Dublin, when appointed to succeed Dr. Grimley in Roman Catholic Archdiocese of Cape Town, as Vicar Apostolic of the Cape of Good Hope and Titular Bishop of Corada, serving from 1872 until he died on 19 February 1908, he was succeeded by Dr. John Rooney as Bishop.
