= San Francesco d'Assisi ad Acilia =

Church of Saint Francis of Assisi in Acilia
- San Francesco d'Assisi ad Acilia (in Italian); S. Francisci Assisiensis in Acilia (in Latin)
- Click on the map for a fullscreen view
- 41.782229°N 12.351885°E
- Location: Largo Cesidio da Fossa 18, Acilia, Rome
- Country: Italy
- Denomination: Roman Catholic
- Tradition: Roman Rite
- Website: Official website

History
- Status: Titular church
- Dedication: Francis of Assisi

Architecture
- Architect: Vincenzo Passarelli
- Architectural type: Church
- Groundbreaking: 1953
- Completed: 1954

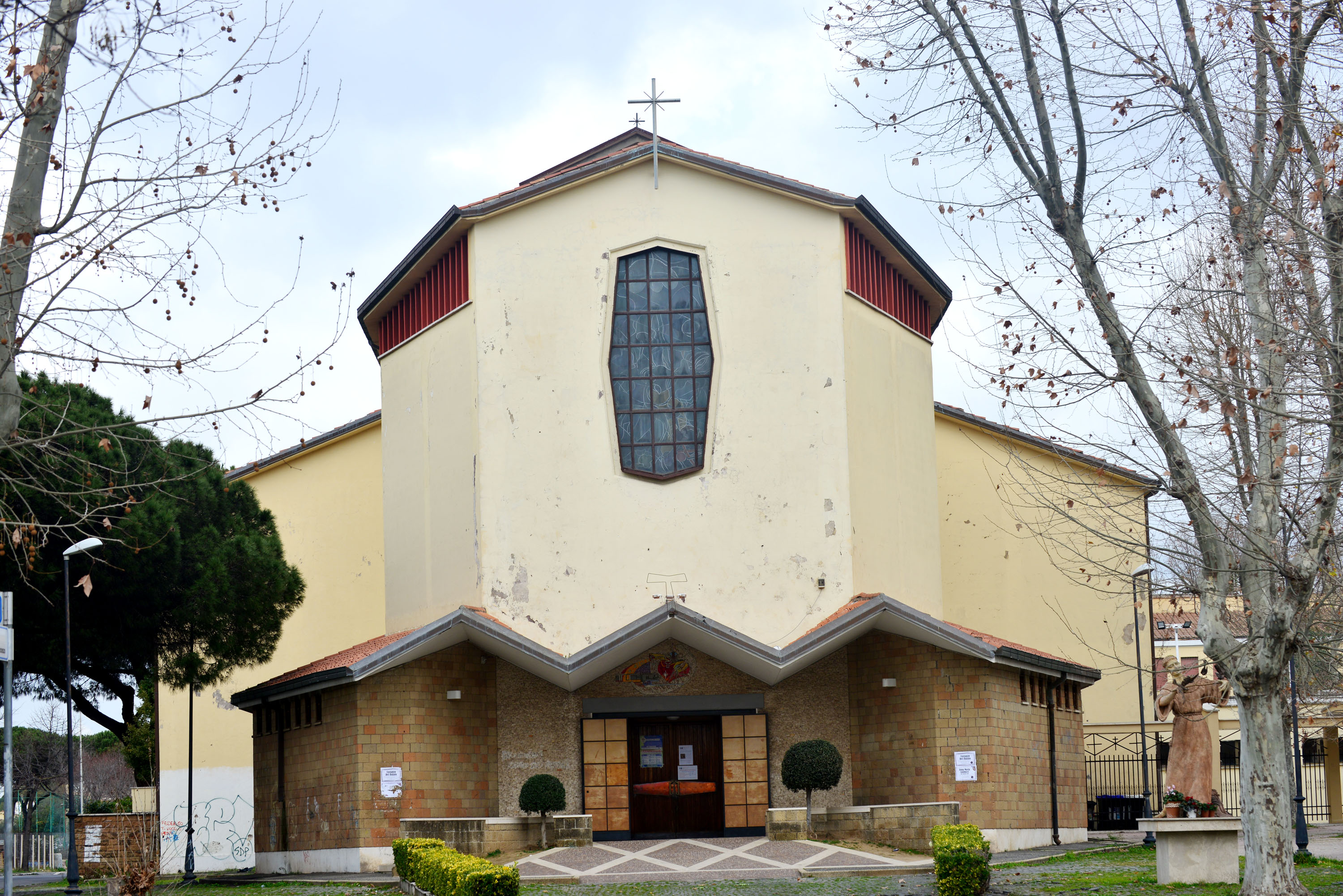
Church of St. Francis of Assisi in Acilia

The Church of Saint Francis of Assisi in Acilia (Italian: San Francesco d'Assisi ad Acilia, Latin: S. Francisci Assisiensis in Acilia) is a Roman Catholic titular church in Acilia, a northwestern suburb of Rome, built as a parish church in the 1950s. On 21 February 2001 Pope John Paul II made it a titular church as a seat for Cardinals.

The present Cardinal Priest of the Titulus San Francisci Assisiensis in Acilia is Wilfrid Fox Napier.

== List of Cardinal Priests ==
- Wilfrid Fox Napier (21 February 2001 – present)
