= Mammillaria (disambiguation) =

Mammillaria is a genus of the cactus family (Cactaceae).

Mammillaria may also refer to:

- Miliaria profunda, skin disease sometimes known as Mammillaria
- Mammillary body, part of the brain

== See also ==
- Mammilla (disambiguation)
