= Hugh Boyle (bishop) =

Irish-born Catholic priest in South Africa

Hugh Boyle D.D.
- Bishop of Johannesburg
- Church: Catholic Church
- Diocese: Diocese of Johannesburg
- In office: 18 July 1954 – 24 January 1976
- Predecessor: William Patrick Whelan
- Successor: Joseph Patrick Fitzgerald
- Previous posts: Bishop of Port Elizabeth (1951-1954); Vicar Apostolic of Port Elizabeth (1948-1951); Titular Bishop of Bagai (1948-1951)

Orders
- Ordination: 24 December 1923 by Willem Marinus van Rossum
- Consecration: 2 February 1949 by Martin Lucas

Personal details
- Born: 13 December 1897 Dunloy, County Antrim, United Kingdom of Great Britain and Ireland
- Died: 4 December 1986 (aged 88) Lady Selbourne, Pretoria, Province of Transvaal, South Africa
- Education: Propaganda College

Bishop Hugh Boyle, DD (13 December 1897 – 4 December 1986) was an Irish-born Catholic priest who served as a bishop in South Africa.

== Biography ==
Boyle was born in Dunloy, County Antrim, Ireland. After working in Belfast in 1914 he resumed his education at Mungret College in Limerick. In 1920 he went to Propaganda College, Rome, earning a Doctorate in Theology in 1924

He was ordained a priest in Rome in 1923, by Cardinal Van Rossum. He moved to Port Elizabeth, South Africa in 1924, and worked as assistant editor of The Southern Cross. Msgr Boyle served as Vicar Apostolic to Diocese of Port Elizabeth in 1948. He served as titular bishop of Bagai from 1948 to 1951.

Dr Boyle was appointed Bishop of Port Elizabeth, South Africa, on 11 January 1951 and translated to the See of Johannesburg on 18 July 1954. He resigned as Bishop on 2 May 1976.

Bishop Boyle died on 12 December 1986 at Holy Cross Old Age Home, Lady Selbourne, Pretoria.
