= Mbongolwane =

Mbongolwane Amashazi Agri Pty LTD Mkhwishimane Reserves
- Location within KwaZulu-Natal Location within South Africa
- Coordinates: 28.935°S 31.195°E
- Country: South Africa
- Province: KwaZulu-Natal
- District: uThungulu
- Municipality: uMlalazi

Government
  - Councillor: Ntuli Area

Area
  - Total: 24.29 km^{2} (9.38 sq mi)

Population (2011)
  - Total: 2,253
  - Density: 92.75/km^{2} (240.2/sq mi)

Racial makeup (2011)
  - Black African: 98.7%
  - Indian/Asian: 1.0%
  - White: 0.1%
  - Other: 0.2%

First languages (2011)
  - Zulu: 93.4%
  - English: 2.8%
  - Other: 3.8%
- Time zone: UTC+2 (SAST)

Mbongolwane is a town in Uthungulu District Municipality in the KwaZulu-Natal province of South Africa.

Mbongolwane district hospital is located in this town.
