= Mammilla (Africa) =

Mammilla was an ancient city and bishopric in Algeria. It is now a Latin Catholic titular see.

== History ==
The city was important enough in the Roman province of Mauretania Caesariensis to become a suffragan bishopric of its capital's Metropolitan Archbishop of Caesarea in Mauretania.

== Titular see ==
The diocese was nominally restored as a Latin Catholic titular bishopric in 1933.

It was suppressed as titular see in 1974, having had only these two incumbents, both of the lowest (episcopal) rank :

- Patrick O’Boyle (1970.10.12 – 1971.11.25)
- Bishop-elect Stephen Naidoo, Redemptorists (C.SS.R.) (1974.07.01 – 1974.08.02), as Auxiliary Bishop of Cape Town (South Africa) (1974.07.01 – 1984.10.20), later Titular Bishop of Aquæ flaviæ (1974.08.02 – 1984.10.20) and succeeding as Metropolitan Archbishop of the above Cape Town (1984.10.20 – 1989.07.01)

== Sources and external links ==
- GigaCatholic, with titular incumbent biography links
- Catholic Hierarchy ^{[self-published]}
