= Wilfrid Napier =

South African Catholic prelate

His Eminence Wilfrid Napier O.F.M.
- Cardinal; Archbishop Emeritus of Durban
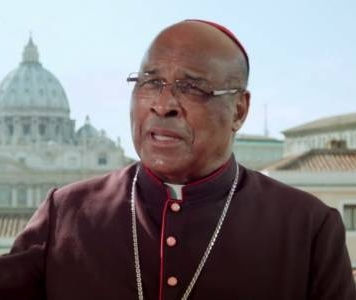
- Napier on 17 October 2018 in Rome
- Church: Roman Catholic Church
- Archdiocese: Durban
- See: Durban
- Appointed: 29 May 1992
- Term ended: 9 June 2021
- Predecessor: Denis Eugene Hurley
- Successor: Siegfried Jwara
- Other post: Cardinal-Priest of San Francesco d’Assisi ad Acilia (2001–present)
- Previous posts: Apostolic Administrator of Kokstad (1978–1980); Bishop of Kokstad (1980–1992); President of the Southern African Catholic Bishops' Conference (1987–1993; 2000–2008); President of Inter-Regional Meeting of Bishops of Southern Africa (1988–1994; 2003–2006); Archbishop of Durban (1992–2021); Apostolic Administrator of Umzimkulu (1994–2008)

Orders
- Ordination: 25 July 1970 by John Evangelist McBride
- Consecration: 28 February 1981 by Denis Hurley
- Created cardinal: 21 February 2001 by Pope John Paul II
- Rank: Cardinal-Priest

Personal details
- Born: Wilfrid Fox Napier; 8 March 1941 (age 85) Matatiele, Cape, Union of South Africa (modern-South Africa)
- Denomination: Catholic (Roman Rite)
- Motto: Pax et Bonum ("Peace and all good")
- Coat of arms

Wilfrid Fox Napier, O.F.M. (born 8 March 1941) is a South African Catholic prelate who served as Archbishop of Durban from 1992 to 2021. He was made a cardinal in 2001. He served as Bishop of Kokstad from 1981 to 1992 and is a member of the Order of Friars Minor.

Styles of Wilfrid Fox Napier
- Reference style: His Eminence
- Spoken style: Your Eminence
- Informal style: Cardinal
- See: Durban

== Biography ==
Napier was born on 8 March 1941 in Matatiele, South Africa. He joined the Franciscan Novitiate in Killarney before moving to St Anthony s College, Galway, to study at UCG. He graduated from University College Galway in 1964 with a degree in Latin and English. Studying at the Irish Franciscans St Anthony's College, Leuven, he obtained an MA degree in philosophy and theology from the Catholic University of Louvain in Belgium.

He was ordained a priest of the Order of Friars Minor on 25 July 1970. On 15 May 1978 he was appointed apostolic administrator of Kokstad and on 29 November 1980 he was appointed bishop there. He chose as his episcopal motto the phrase pax et bonum which means "peace and goodwill".

On 29 March 1992, he was named to succeed Denis Hurley as Archbishop of Durban.

During the early nineties, he and other church leaders were involved in mediation and negotiation during the unrest leading up to the 1994 election and was present in September 1991 when the Peace Accord was signed. He was president of the Southern African Catholic Bishops' Conference in 1987-94 and 1999. He was also apostolic administrator of Umzimkulu from 1 August 1994 to 14 March 2009.

In 1995, he received the honorary degree of Doctor of Laws from University College Galway, his alma mater.

Napier is a member of the Episcopal Board of the International Commission on English in the Liturgy (ICEL).

Pope John Paul II made Napier a Cardinal-Priest on 21 February 2001 and assigned the titular church of San Francesco d'Assisi ad Acilia. He was one of the cardinal electors who participated in the 2005 papal conclave that selected Pope Benedict XVI. On 21 March 2012, Pope Benedict XVI named him a member of the Pontifical Council for the Pastoral Care of Health Care Workers.

He was a cardinal elector at the 2013 papal conclave that elected Pope Francis. As the conclave neared he described himself as "very frightened"; he thought there was a "higher likelihood" the next pope would be non-European and said that "The centre of gravity of the church has also shifted from the north to the south."

Pope Francis accepted his resignation as archbishop of Durban on 9 June 2021. Napier continues as apostolicae administrator of the archdiocese until his successor is installed.

He has been an occasional contributor to the South African national Catholic weekly The Southern Cross. Napier is a supporter of English football club Burnley.

== Views ==
=== AIDS ===
In January 2005, Napier stated, in comments similar to some made by Pope Benedict XVI, that government programmes to distribute condoms were ineffectual in stemming the spread of HIV. Instead, he proposed programmes based upon the principle of abstinence.

=== Vatican's views on Africa ===
In October 2003, Cardinal Napier stated that, to some extent, the Vatican lacks a "sufficient sensitivity to African churches." He said the trips Pope John Paul II made to Africa have helped, since every time he comes, Vatican officials are forced to learn something about Africa.

=== Paedophilia comments controversy ===
On 17 March 2013, in a BBC interview Napier said that "From my experience paedophilia is actually an illness, it is not a criminal condition, it is an illness." He went on to explain that he did not mean that there was to be not criminal liability. He mentioned two priests he knew who were abused as children and went on to become paedophiles and said: "Now don't tell me that those people are criminally responsible like somebody who chooses to do something like that. I don't think you can really take the position and say that person deserves to be punished. He was himself damaged." Michael Walsh, a biographer of Pope John Paul II, stated that at one time this was the view of many Catholics in the US and UK. Barbara Dorries from Chicago-based Survivors Network of those Abused by Priests and, herself a victim of sex abuse from a priest when she was a child told the BBC: "If it is a disease that's fine, but it's also a crime and crimes are punished, criminals are held accountable for what they did and what they do."

Napier attacked the BBC after the broadcast for being "sensationalist" and "putting words into my mouth". He added: "I made it quite clear that paedophilia is a crime, and that we as a church have got a whole process in place for dealing with it."

Napier apologised via Twitter for his comments: "I apologise to victims of child abuse offended by my misstatement of what was and still is my concern about all abused, including abused abuser." He went on to say "It's the supreme irony. Because I raised the issue of the abused abuser, I stand accused of insensitivity to the sufferings of the abused."

=== Climate change ===
In December 2011 Napier criticised world leaders on their failure to keep climate change commitments. He said "We express our displeasure with local and international political leadership which has failed to take decisive steps to make the changes required for the survival of humanity and life on earth. We as the religious community demand that our political leaders honour previous commitments and move towards ethically responsible positions and policies."

=== Marriage and family ===
Cardinal Napier said in 2015 that the recent two Synod of Bishops dedicated to marriage and family life enabled for there to be "a strong focus on the problems and challenges facing the family", calling for the Church to accompany them through times of crisis. Napier further said that it was important to identify concretely what married couples needed to do in order to strengthen their marital bond which in turn would allow them to properly identify how to strengthen their family lives.

=== Black Lives Matter ===
On 28 August 2020 Cardinal Napier voiced criticism of Black Lives Matter claiming it had been hijacked due to views the movement had expressed on the family and abortion, which the Cardinal believes undermines the cause of racial justice, tweeting "It’s time to state honestly what BLM really stands for – destroying the traditional Family AND what it actually does – destroying property including religious building and objects!" and "Another crucial test of the authenticity of the Black Lives Matter movement will be its stance vis-a-vis Planned Parenthood and the Abortion Industry!"

Catholic Church titles
Preceded by John Evangelist McBride	— TITULAR — Bishop of Kokstad; 29 November 1980 – 29 May 1992	Succeeded by William Matthew Slattery
Preceded by Denis Eugene Hurley	President of the Southern African Episcopal Conference; 1987 – 1993	Succeeded by Louis Ncamiso Ndlovu
Preceded by Reginald Joseph Orsmond	President of the Inter-Regional Meeting of Bishops of Southern Africa; 1988 – 1994	Succeeded by Patrick Fani Chakaipa
Preceded by Denis Eugene Hurley	Archbishop of Durban; 29 May 1992 – 9 June 2021	Vacant
Preceded by Louis Ncamiso Ndlovu	President of the Southern African Episcopal Conference; 2000 – November 2008	Succeeded by Buti Joseph Tlhagale
New title	Cardinal Priest of San Francesco d'Assisi ad Acilia; 21 February 2001 –	Incumbent
Preceded by Louis Ncamiso Ndlovu	President of the Inter-Regional Meeting of Bishops of Southern Africa; 2003 – 2006	Succeeded by Buti Joseph Tlhagale
