= The Southern Cross (South Africa) =

- Southern Africa's Catholic Monthly
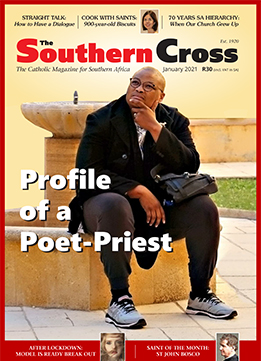
- January 2021 cover
- Type: Monthly magazine
- Format: A3 magazine
- Owner(s): Catholic Newspaper & Publishing Ltd.
- Editor-in-chief: Günther Simmermacher
- Launched: 16 October 1920
- Headquarters: Bouquet Street; Cape Town, 8001
- Country: South Africa
- Website: SouthernCross

The Southern Cross is a South African monthly Catholic magazine, which from 1920 to 2020 was the only Catholic weekly in the country. It is published independently but with the support of the Southern African Catholic Bishops Conference. First published on 16 October 1920, it appeared uninterrupted every week until 23 September 2020, after which the publication transitioned into a monthly magazine. The current editor-in-chief is Günther Simmermacher.

== Ownership ==
The Southern Cross is published by the Catholic Newspaper & Publishing Company Ltd., which is based in Cape Town. The publication is financed by sales and advertising, as well as revenue from sales of books published under The Southern Cross Books imprint, international pilgrimages, and financial support from its Associates’ Campaign. It receives no funding from the bishops conference.

== Publication and circulation ==
Most issues are sold in churches at weekend Masses, with subscriptions in print and digital format available. The Southern Cross is also available by postal subscription and as a digital edition. It is not sold in retail outlets other than Catholic bookshops.

== Editorial ==
The editor of The Southern Cross has full editorial independence, confirmed in 2009 by the then-President of the Southern African Catholic Bishops' Conference, Archbishop Buti Tlhagale of the Archdiocese of Johannesburg.

== Global reception ==
The Southern Cross editorials have frequently made worldwide news. In 2001 an editorial that argued that the Catholic Church should allow the use of condoms in marriages in which only one spouse is infected with HIV was picked up by the BBC World News, Voice of America, Time, and other publications.

In 2011, an editorial that criticised the presence of Zimbabwean President Robert Mugabe at the beatification of Pope John Paul II in the Vatican was reported on widely, especially in the international Catholic press.

In 2014, an editorial calling on the Catholic Church to condemn controversial anti-gay laws in Nigeria and the Uganda Anti-Homosexuality Act, 2014 was picked up by the news service of the Vatican's missionary dicastery, the Congregation for the Evangelization of Peoples. A Vatican analyst for the Italian newspaper La Stampa suggested that by picking up The Southern Cross’ critical editorial but not a congratulatory statement by the president of the Nigerian bishop's conference, the Vatican had voiced its disapproval of the draconian policies which are tantamount to persecution, and called on African bishops to "speak out ... against the discriminatory legislation and violence directed at homosexuals, many of whom are fellow Catholics."

== History ==
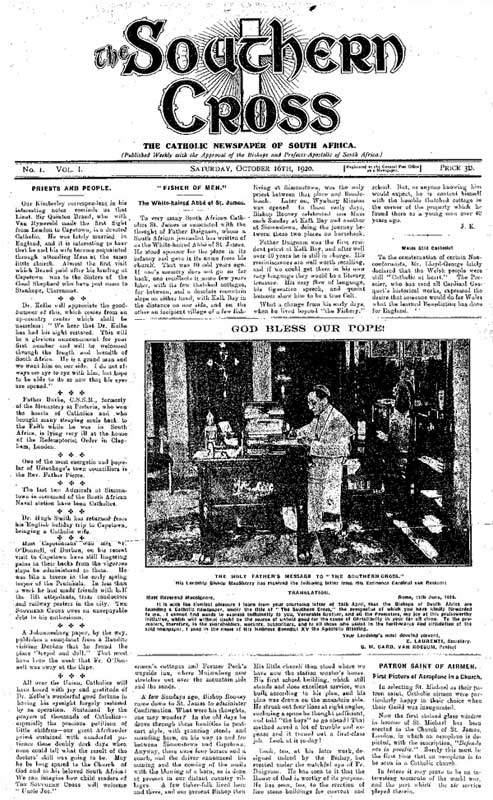
The Southern Cross first published 16 October 1920

The idea for a national Catholic newspaper was first raised by two priests, Fr James Kelly of Cape Town and Fr Leo Sormany OMI of Durban. When the bishops of South Africa met in Durban in 1919, they decided to establish such a newspaper under the name The Crusader. Fr Kelly was appointed its first editor, and he proposed the name "The Southern Cross", after a defunct Anglican newspaper.

The Catholic Newspaper & Publishing Company Ltd was floated in June 1920, with the bishops, as founders, holding 51% of the shares. The Southern Cross hit the churches on Sunday, 17 October 1920 (a day after the cover date), with a circulation of 3,500 and cover price of 3 pence. Within a few weeks, circulation had risen to 6,000. In the 1930s circulation had grown in excess of 10,000, but World War II brought circulation down again. Between 1953 and 1963, circulation increased by 57%. In 1956 it stood at 15,000, in 1964 at 18,500. That was in the midst of the Second Vatican Council. After that circulation started to drop, as it did at many other newspapers. In 1970 it was still around 16,000, two years later 14,000, and in 1974 it had decreased to 12,600. By the mid-1990s, circulation dipped to below 10,000 for the first time since the war. During the 2000s it stood steadily at above 11,000.

During Vatican II, Archbishop Denis Hurley of Durban, a leading participant in the council, regularly wrote anonymous but well-informed articles for The Southern Cross. In 2001 he wrote a 17-part series of the council which formed the basis for a book of memoirs by Archbishop Hurley.

== Books ==
In the 1930s the Catholic Newspaper & Publishing Company opened a Catholic bookshop in Cape Town, in part to sell its own titles. The company sold the bookshop to the Schoenstatt Institute in 1982. Since then The Southern Cross has sporadically published, including I Call You Companions by Fr Nicholas King SJ (1995, in association with the Catholic Bookshop in Cape Town), The Holy Land Trek by Günther Simmermacher (2010), a guide to the film The Passion of the Christ, two anthologies by long-standing columnists, Any Major Sunday by Owen Williams and Moerdyk Files by Chris Moerdyk, and Church Chuckles, a collection of Catholic jokes compiled by Simmermacher with cartoons by Conrad Burke.

== Editors ==
Until 1995, all editors were priests, assisted by lay editors (later named managing editors), who were professional journalists. With the two-stint editorship of Owen McCann, first in the 1940s and again between 1986 and 1991, The Southern Cross has been edited by a future and an existing cardinal. Michael Shackleton, a former priest who was appointed in 1995, was the first editor not to belong to the clergy. His successor, Günther Simmermacher, was the first lay editor of the newspaper, bringing to a full circle a discussion which had begun before the newspaper first appeared in 1920.

- Fr James Kelly (1920–21)
- Mgr John Colgan (1921–22)
- Mgr John Morris (1923–31)
- Mgr John Colgan (1931–41)
- Fr Owen McCann (1941–48)
- Fr Louis Stubbs (1948–72)
- Mgr Donald de Beer (1974–86)
- Cardinal Owen McCann (1986–91)
- Fr Bernard Connor OP (1991–95)
- Michael Shackleton (1995–2001)
- Günther Simmermacher (since 2001)
