= Diocese of Port Elizabeth (Catholic) =

Latin Catholic diocese in South Africa

Coordinates: 33°57′S 25°36′E

Diocese of Port Elizabeth Dioecesis Portus Elizabethensis

Location
- Country: South Africa
- Metropolitan: Cape Town

Statistics
- Area: 71,828 km^{2} (27,733 sq mi)
- Population: Total; Catholics: (as of 2004); 2,698,800; 98,800 (3.7%)

Information
- Denomination: Catholic Church
- Sui iuris church: Latin Church
- Rite: Roman Rite

Current leadership
- Pope: Leo XIV
- Bishop: Vincent Mduduzi Zungu, OFM

The Diocese of Port Elizabeth (Latin: Portus Elizabethen(sis)) is a Latin Catholic diocese located in the city of Port Elizabeth in the ecclesiastical province of Cape Town in South Africa.

== History ==
On July 30, 1847, an ecclesiastical territory was established as the Apostolic Vicariate of Cape of Good Hope, Eastern District from the Apostolic Vicariate of Cape of Good Hope and adjacent territories. Later the Eastern Vicariate was itself subdivided three times.

On 27 December 1847, Aidan Devereux was consecrated, in Cape Town, Bishop of Paneas and first Vicar Apostolic of the Eastern Vicariate, by Griffith, under whom he had worked for nine years. Through the Dhanis family of Belgium the new vicar Apostolic received the first considerable funds to start work. But his life was spent in the turmoil of wars, and was a struggle with poverty and the dearth of priests. His successor, Patrick Moran, had been curate of Irishtown, Dublin, and arrived in the colony in November, 1856. He was a man of energy, and a strenuous opponent of the grant of responsible government. The Sacred Congregation of Propaganda appointed him first Bishop of Dunedin, New Zealand, in 1870. Next year, the James David Richards was consecrated bishop at Grahamstown, as titular bishop of Retimo, by the Vicar Apostolic of Natal, Allard. Richards had already spent twenty-two years in the country and, whether as a writer, or lecturer, or pastor, had left his mark in the land. He founded the Cape Colonist, a paper which had campaigning views on purity in public life and on the native problems. In 1880 he brought to South Africa the first contingent of Trappists, as teachers. About two years before Ricards's death a coadjutor was appointed in the person of Peter Strobino, who, however, became an invalid soon after the death of Ricards. Strobino was succeeded in 1896 by his coadjutor, Hugh MacSherry, formerly administrator of the diocese of Dundalk in Ireland, who had been consecrated a few months before.

- June 13, 1939: Renamed as Apostolic Vicariate of Port Elizabeth
- January 11, 1951: Promoted as Diocese of Port Elizabeth

== Special churches ==
- The cathedral is Cathedral of St. Augustine in Port Elizabeth.
- The Port Elizabeth Oratory serves the parish of St Bernadette in Walmer.

== Bishops ==
- Vicars Apostolic of Cape of Good Hope, Eastern District (Roman rite)
  - Patrick Raymond Griffith (1837.06.06 - 1847.07.30), appointed Vicar Apostolic of Cape of Good Hope, Western District {Capo di Buona Speranza, Distretto Occidentale})
  - Aidan Devereux (1847–1854.02.11)
  - Michael Jones (1854.09.26), did not take effect and he was never consecrated bishop
  - Edward MacCabe (1855.01.30), did not take effect; was appointed bishop at the time but was not consecrated until 1877; future Archbishop and Cardinal
  - Patrick Moran (1856–1869.12.03) appointed Bishop of Dunedin, New Zealand
  - James David Richards (1871.01.13 – 1893.11.30)
  - Peter Strobino (1893.11.30 – 1896.10.01)
  - Hugh McSherry (1896.10.01 – 1938.12.15), appointed Archbishop upon retirement
- Vicars Apostolic of Port Elizabeth (Roman rite)
  - James Colbert (1939.06.13 – 1948.12.09), Irish born (Cork) bishop
  - Hugh Boyle (1948.12.09 – 1951.01.11 see below)
- Bishops of Port Elizabeth (Roman rite)
  - Hugh Boyle (see above 1951.01.11 – 1954.07.18), appointed Bishop of Johannesburg
  - Ernest Arthur Green (1955.04.19 – 1970.12.27), South African born bishop (educated in Ireland)
  - John Patrick Murphy (1972.05.06 – 1986.03.21)
  - Michael Gower Coleman (1986.03.21 - 2011.08.20))
  - Vincent Mduduzi Zungu (2014.02.02 -)

=== Coadjutor Bishops ===
- Hugh McSherry (1896), as Coadjutor Vicar Apostolic
- Pietro Strobino (1891-1893)

== See also ==
- Catholic Church in South Africa
- Port Elizabeth Oratory
