= Palaeopolis in Pamphylia =

Ancient city in Pamphylia

See Paleopolis for namesakes

Palaeopolis (or Palæopolis) in Pamphylia was an Ancient city and bishopric in Asia Minor (now Anatolia, Asian Turkey), and is a Catholic episcopal titular see.

== History ==
Palæopolis, at the site of modern Akören (the one in Adana Province's Aladağ district?), was important enough in the Roman province of Pamphylia Secunda to become a suffragan bishopric of the capital Perge's Metropolitan Archbishop.

== Titular see ==
The diocese was nominally restored in 1933 as a titular bishopric of the lowest (episcopal) rank.

It is vacant, having had a single, Eastern Catholic incumbent:

- Titular Bishop Ioan Dragomir (1949 – 1985.04.25), as Auxiliary Bishop of Maramureş of the Romanians (Romania) (1949 – 1964), later succeeding as Apostolic Administrator of the same Maramureş of the Romanians (Romanian language Byzantine Rite) (1964 – 1985.04.25)

== See also ==
- Palaeopolis in Asia
