= Stephen Naidoo =

Catholic bishop

His Excellency Stephen Naidoo, C.Ss.R.
- Archbishop of Cape Town
- Naidoo in 1987
- Church: Roman Catholic Church
- Archdiocese: Archbishop of Cape Town
- See: Cape Town
- In office: 20 October 1984 - 1 July 1989
- Predecessor: Owen McCann
- Previous posts: Monastery priest, teacher

Orders
- Ordination: 29 June 1961
- Consecration: 15 September 1974 by Owen McCann

Personal details
- Born: 23 October 1937 Cape Town
- Died: 1 July 1989 (aged 51) Cape Town
- Education: Pontifical University of St. Thomas Aquinas
- Coat of arms

Stephen Naidoo, C.Ss.R. (29 October 1937 – 1 July 1989), was a South African Redemptorist and archbishop of the Roman Catholic Church. Archbishop of Cape Town from 1984 to 1989.

== Biography ==
Born in 1937 in Cape Town in an Indian immigrated family, Naidoo was ordained Redemptorist priest in 1961 and graduated at Pontifical University of St. Thomas Aquinas.

Consecrated auxiliary-bishop of Cape Town on 15 September 1974, he became archbishop on 20 October 1984. In 1988 he was imprisoned because of his ideas against apartheid.

He died on 1 July 1989.
