= Diocese of Aliwal =

Latin Catholic diocese in South Africa

Coordinates: 30°41′S 26°42′E

Diocese of Aliwal Dioecesis Alivalensis

Location
- Country: South Africa
- Metropolitan: Cape Town

Statistics
- Area: 31,200 km^{2} (12,000 sq mi)
- Population: Total; Catholics: (as of 2007); 536,000; 42,300 (7.9%)

Information
- Denomination: Catholic Church
- Sui iuris church: Latin Church
- Rite: Roman Rite

Current leadership
- Pope: Leo XIV
- Bishop: Joseph Kizito
- Bishops emeritus: Michael Wüstenberg

Roman Catholic Cathedral, Aliwal North

The Diocese of Aliwal (Latin: Alivalen(sis)) is a Latin Catholic diocese located in the city of Aliwal North (Joe Gqabi District Municipality) in the ecclesiastical province of Cape Town in South Africa.

== History ==
- June 12, 1923: Established as Apostolic Prefecture of Gariep from the Apostolic Vicariate of Cape of Good Hope, Eastern District
- January 27, 1936: Promoted as Apostolic Vicariate of Aliwal
- January 11, 1951: Promoted as Diocese of Aliwal
- 1953: the Diocese was split into two parts, the “Diocese of Aliwal” and the “Prefecture of De Aar”
- 2019: the Diocese had two active parishes, three missions and 12 priests

== Special churches ==
- Sacred Heart Cathedral is situated on the corner of Cathcart and Young Streets in Aliwal North.

== Leadership ==
Prefect Apostolic of Gariep

- Fr. Franz Wolfgang Demont, S.C.I. (27 July 1923 – 27 January 1936 see below)

Vicars Apostolic of Aliwal

- Franz Wolfgang Demont, S.C.I. (see above 27 January 1936 – 3 February 1944)
- Johannes Baptist Lück, S.C.I. (13 March 1947 – 11 January 1951 see below)

Bishops of Aliwal

- Johannes Baptist Lück, S.C.I. (see above 11 January 1951 – 17 December 1973)
- Everardus Antonius M. Baaij, S.C.I. (17 December 1973 – 30 October 1981)
- Fritz Lobinger (18 November 1987 – 29 April 2004)
- Michael Wuestenberg (24 February 2008 – 1 September 2017)
- Joseph Kizito (15 November 2019 – present)

== See also ==
- Catholic Church in South Africa
