= Lawrence Patrick Henry =

- Archbishop of Cape Town
- Church: Catholic Church
- Archdiocese: Archdiocese of Cape Town
- In office: 7 July 1990 – 18 December 2009
- Predecessor: Stephen Naidoo
- Successor: Stephen Brislin
- Previous posts: Titular Bishop of Cenculiana (1987-1990); Auxiliary Bishop of Cape Town (1987-1990)

Orders
- Ordination: 22 December 1962
- Consecration: 16 August 1987 by Stephen Naidoo

Personal details
- Born: 27 July 1934 Cape Town, Cape Province, Union of South Africa, British Empire
- Died: 4 March 2014 (aged 79)

Lawrence Patrick Henry (27 July 1934 – 4 March 2014) was a South African Roman Catholic archbishop.

Born in Cape Town, South Africa, Henry was ordained to the priesthood for the Roman Catholic Archdiocese of Cape Town in 1962. In 1987, he was appointed titular bishop of Cenculiana and auxiliary bishop of the Cape Town Archdiocese. Henry was appointed Archbishop of the Cape Town Archdiocese in 1990 and retired in 2009. He died in 2014, aged 79.
