= Palaeopolis (Lydia) =

City in ancient Lydia that was included in the late Roman province of Asia Prima

Coordinates: 38°05′07″N 28°13′01″E

Palaeopolis (in Asia) was a city in ancient Lydia that was included in the late Roman province of Asia Prima. Its bishopric was thus a suffragan of Ephesus, the metropolitan see of that province.

Its site is now near the Turkish town of Beydağ. Under the Ottoman Empire, it was in the vilayet (province) of İzmir.

== History ==
The secular history of this city is unknown. In the 6th century AD it is mentioned by Hierocles (Synecdemus 660, 4). It is found in the Notitiae Episcopatuum as late as the 13th century, among the suffragan sees of Ephesus. Le Quien (Oriens christianus I:729) mentions seven bishops of this city known by their presence at councils: Rhodon at Ephesus, 431; Basilicus at Chalcedon, 451; Eusebius at Constantinople, 536; George at Constantinople, 692; Gregory at Nicaea, 787; Peter at Constantinople, 869; Julian at Constantinople, 879.

== Titular see ==
No longer a residential see, the bishopric is included in the Catholic Church's list of titular sees since its nominal restoration in the 18th century as Paleopolis, renamed Palaeopolis in 1925, and finally in 1933 renamed Palæopolis in Asia, avoiding confusion with its Pamphylian namesake.

It is vacant since decades, having had the following incumbents of the lowest (episcopal) rank :

- Teodor Machciński (1730.02.08 – ?), no office recorded
- Giovanni Pietro Martino Pellegrini (1786.04.03 – death 1830.02.18), no office recorded
- Patrick Raymund Griffith, Dominican Order (O.P.) (1837.06.06 – death 1862.06.18), as Apostolic Vicar of Cape of Good Hope and adjacent territories (South Africa) (1837.06.06 – 1847.07.30) and later Apostolic Vicar of Cape of Good Hope, Western District (South Africa) (1847.07.30 – 1862.06.18)
- Gábor Máriássy (1865.03.27 – death 1871.10.26), as Auxiliary Bishop of Eger (Hungary) (1865.03.27 – 1871.10.26)
- Simeone Volonteri (安西满), Pontifical Institute for Foreign Missions (M.E.M.) (1873.07.22 – death 1904.12.21), as Apostolic Vicar of Honan 河南 (China) (1873.07.22 – 1882.08.28) and Apostolic Vicar of Southern Honan 河南南境 (China) (1882.08.28 – 1904.12.21)
- Antal Fetser (1906.03.08 – 1915.01.22), as Auxiliary Bishop of Oradea Mare (Romania) (1906.03.08 – 1915.01.22); later Bishop of Győr (Hungary) (1915.01.22 –death 1933.10.06)
- Carlo Sica (1917.12.20 – 1921.11.21), former Bishop of Foligno (Italy) (1915.01.22 – 1917.12.20), later Titular Metropolitan Archbishop of Damascus (1921.11.21 – 1939.12.02)
- Bishop-elect Guglielmo Piani, Salesians (S.D.B.) (1921.12.16 – 1922.02.17) as Auxiliary Bishop of Puebla de los Angeles (Mexico) (1921.12.16 – 1922.02.17); later Titular Archbishop of Velicia (1922.02.17 – 1934.04.21) & Apostolic Delegate (papal diplomatic envoy) to Philippines (1922.02.17 – 1948.10.05), Titular Metropolitan Archbishop of Nicosia (1934.04.21 – 1956.09.27) & Auxiliary Bishop of México (Mexico) (1951.04.13 – 1956.09.27)
- Ernesto Coppo, S.D.B. (1922.12.01 – death 1948.12.28), Apostolic Vicar of Kimberley in Western Australia (Australia) (1922.12.01 – retired 1928)
- Souleyman Sayegh (1953.11.27 – death 1961.09.18), Auxiliary Eparch of Mossul of the Chaldeans (Iraq) (1953.11.27 – 1961.09.18)
- Emmanuel-Karim Delly (1962.12.26 – 1967.05.06) as Auxiliary Eparch of the Patriarchate Babylon of the Chaldeans (Iraq) ([1962.12.07] 1962.12.26 – 1997), later Titular Archbishop of Kaškar of the Chaldeans (1967.05.06 – 2003.12.03) & Bishop of Curia of the Chaldeans (1997 – 2002.10.24), elected Patriarch of Babylon of the Chaldeans (Iraq) ([2003.12.03] 2003.12.03 – death 2012.12.19) as Emmanuel III Delly, also President of Synod of the Chaldean Church (2003.12.03 – 2012.12.19), President of Assembly of the Catholic Bishops of Iraq (2003.12.03 – 2012.12.19), created Cardinal-Patriarch (2007.11.24 – 2014.04.08, without titular church in Rome)

== See also ==
- Catholic Church in Turkey
- Palaeopolis in Pamphylia
