= Port Elizabeth Oratory =

Oratory in Gqeberha, South Africa

The Port Elizabeth Oratory is a Congregation of the Oratory of St Philip Neri in Walmer, Port Elizabeth, South Africa. The Congregation serves the Catholic parish of St Bernadette in the Diocese of Port Elizabeth. The Oratory Fathers also run an Educare Centre known as St Anne’s, and serve at St Dominic’s Priory School.

== History ==
The Port Elizabeth Oratory was founded from the Oudtshoorn Oratory when, in 2002, a group of Oratorian priests and brothers took up residence in Port Elizabeth. After the period of formation, with the assistance of the Oxford Oratory, particularly in the person of Fr Jerome Bertram, the new Oratory in Port Elizabeth was canonically established on 12 May 2008 by the Holy See.
