= Everardus Antonius M. Baaij =

Dutch Roman Catholic missionary bishop

The Right Rev. Everardus Antonius M. Baaij, S.C.J.
- Bishop emeritus of Aliwal
- Church: Roman Catholic Church
- See: Aliwal
- Installed: 17 December 1973
- Term ended: 30 October 1981
- Predecessor: Johannes Baptist Lück, S.C.J.
- Successor: Fritz Lobinger

Orders
- Ordination: 20 July 1947
- Consecration: 23 May 1974 by Joseph P. Fitzgerald, O.M.I.

Personal details
- Born: 24 March 1921 Rotterdam, Netherlands
- Died: 31 January 2012 (aged 90) Port Elizabeth, Republic of South Africa
- Motto: Veni Creator

Everardus Antonius M. Baaij SCJ (24 March 1921 – 31 January 2012) was a Dutch bishop of the Roman Catholic Church in South Africa. At the time of his death, he was the oldest bishop belonging to his religious congregation.

== Biography ==
Baaij was born in Rotterdam into a non-Catholic home. He was introduced to the Catholic faith as a young man, and immediately felt called to become a priest. His parents allowed him to take catechism classes and to be received into the Catholic Church. Still feeling a draw to the ministry, he explored entering the minor seminary of the local diocese, but found that the tuition was beyond his family's means. By chance, he encountered a member of the Congregation of the Priests of the Sacred Heart and entered their seminary. He persevered and was ordained a priest on 20 July 1947.

After this, Baaij was sent to France where he did language studies in preparation for service in French Canada, where he also worked as a hospital chaplain, which proved to be a ministry he enjoyed. He was sent to Canada in 1949 and was initially assigned to teach in a minor seminary of the congregation in Delaware, Ontario. He became a Canadian citizen in 1955. Two years later, he was sent to work in the United States. Due to his lack of a proper visa to work there, however, he was asked to serve, instead, in South Africa. The country had been entrusted to the German Province of his congregation by the Holy See in 1923 for the implantation of the Catholic faith, and the American Province had just begun to share in this work in 1948.

When Baaij arrived in South Africa in March 1957, apartheid was in full force, forbidding any racial mixing among the population. As a result, the parish in Middelburg, Eastern Cape, to which he was assigned had three separate churches and congregations in differing locations. He was appointed the second bishop of the Roman Catholic Diocese of Aliwal on 17 December 1973 and consecrated on 23 May 1974 in the Cathedral of the Sacred Heart. He resigned his office on 30 October 1981, due to poor health.

After his resignation, Baaij spent some time in a rehabilitation center. He then began to do the work he loved, serving the sick in medical institutions of various types, from sanitoria to mental health facilities. When the apartheid laws were ended in 1994, he became a citizen of South Africa. He worked to open two hospices in Natal Province, before moving to a nursing home in Port Elizabeth. Continuing his service to the sick as best he could, he died there. His wish was to be buried in Aliwal.
