= Denis Hurley (bishop) =

20th-century Catholic bishop

His Excellency, The Most Reverend Denis Eugene Hurley O.M.I.
- Archbishop emeritus of Durban (Deceased)
- Archdiocese: Durban
- See: Durban
- Appointed: 11 January 1951
- Term ended: 29 May 1992
- Predecessor: Henri Delalle OMI
- Successor: Wilfrid Napier OFM
- Other post: Chancellor of the University of Natal (1993-1998)
- Previous posts: Vicar Apostolic of Natal (1946-1951); Titular Bishop of Turuzi (1946-1951); Apostolic Administrator of the Umzmkulu (1972-1986)

Orders
- Ordination: 9 July 1939
- Consecration: 19 March 1947 by Martin Lucas

Personal details
- Born: 9 November 1915 Cape Town, South Africa
- Died: 13 February 2004 (age 89) Durban, South Africa
- Buried: Lady Chapel, Emmanuel Cathedral, Durban
- Denomination: Roman Catholic Church
- Education: Pontifical University of St. Thomas Aquinas; Pontifical Gregorian University
- Motto: Ubi Spiritus, ibi libertas ("Where the Spirit is, there is liberty")

Styles of Denis Eugene Hurley O.M.I.
- Reference style: His Excellency
- Spoken style: Your Excellency

Ordination history of Denis Hurley
History
Priestly ordination
- Ordained by: Théodore Labouré
- Date: 9 July 1939
- Place: Rome, Italy
Episcopal consecration
- Principal consecrator: Martin Lucas S.V.D.
- Co-consecrators: Michael Adalbero Fleischer David O'Leary
- Date: 19 March 1947
- Place: Durban, South Africa
Episcopal succession
Bishops consecrated by Denis Hurley as principal consecrator
- Dominic Joseph Chwane Khumalo O.M.I.: 4 May 1978
- Wilfrid Napier O.F.M.: 28 February 1981
- Kevin Dowling C.SS.R.: 27 January 1991
- Buti Joseph Tlhagale O.M.I.: 10 April 1999

Denis Eugene Hurley, OMI OMSG (9 November 1915 – 13 February 2004) was a South African Catholic prelate who served as Vicar Apostolic of Natal from 1946 to 1951 and as Archbishop of Durban from 1951 to 1992. He was a member of the Oblates of Mary Immaculate.

He was born in Cape Town and spent his early years on Robben Island, where his father was the lighthouse keeper. In 1951, Hurley was appointed Archbishop of Durban, becoming the youngest archbishop in the world at the time.

Hurley was an active participant in the Second Vatican Council, which he described as "the greatest project of adult education ever held in the world".

An outspoken opponent of apartheid, as chairman of the Southern African Catholic Bishops' Conference, Hurley drafted the first of the ground-breaking pastoral letters in which the bishops denounced apartheid as "blasphemy" and "intrinsically evil." Upon his retirement as archbishop, he served as the chancellor of the University of Natal.

== Life ==
Denis Hurley was born in Cape Town to Irish parents, spending his early years on Robben Island, where his father was the lighthouse keeper. Educated at St Charles College in Pietermaritzburg, Natal, he joined the Missionary Oblates of Mary Immaculate (OMI) in 1931 and in the following year was sent to Ireland for his novitiate.

In 1933, Hurley was sent to the Angelicum University (now known as Pontifical University of Saint Thomas Aquinas) in Rome to study philosophy and theology. He received the degree Licentiate of Philosophy from the Angelicum in 1936 and started studying at the Gregorian University.

Hurley was ordained as a priest in Rome on 9 July 1939 and was awarded his license in Theology in 1940. Later he was appointed curate at Emmanuel Cathedral, Durban, where he stayed until 1943 when he was appointed Superior at Saint Joseph's Scholasticate, then based in Prestbury, Pietermaritzburg. He stayed in this position until 12 December 1946 when, aged 31, was named Vicar Apostolic of Natal and Bishop of Durban. He was the youngest Roman Catholic bishop in the world at that time. He chose as his motto Ubi Spiritus, ibi libertas, which means "Where the Spirit is, there is liberty". Hurley was among the first church leaders to denounce apartheid, condemning the policy as an affront to human dignity.

On 11 January 1951, the Vicariate Apostolic of Natal was elevated to the Archdiocese of Durban and Hurley became archbishop, also the youngest in the world at the time.

In the following year, Hurley became the first president of the newly established Southern African Catholic Bishops Conference, a post he held until 1961. He was again President of this body from 1981 until 1987. Hurley is remembered for his contribution to the struggle against apartheid, his concern for the poor and his commitment towards a more just and peaceful society. In 1961, he was appointed to the Central Preparatory Commission for the Second Vatican Council.

== Second Vatican Council ==
In 1961, Hurley was appointed to the Central Preparatory Commission for the Second Vatican Council. He attributed this to Rome having out-of-date information stating he was still President of the Southern African Bishops Conference, when in fact Archbishop Owen McCann was President. At the council itself, Hurley was elected to the Commission for Seminaries, Studies and Catholic Education. During the council, he gave ten speeches and made four written submissions.

During the council, Hurley wrote a series of anonymous articles for the South African Catholic weekly newspaper "The Southern Cross". In 2001 he wrote a 17-part series of memories of Vatican II for The Southern Cross. In recounting its informal cycle of lectures, workshops and long evenings of debates over dinner with interested members of the clergy and laity, Hurley observed that the presence of so many scholars who had been called to Rome to assist with the work of Vatican II had created "the greatest project of adult education ever held in the world." These articles provided the basis for his posthumously pub

lished memoirs of the Council, Keeping the Dream Alive.

Hurley was described as "...an eloquent and forceful preacher, ...mild-mannered and soft-spoken away from the pulpit. He was a man of formidable intellect, so much so that he was held in awe by his clergy.

== ICEL ==
Hurley took a special interest in the active participation of all the baptized in the church’s liturgy, especially the Mass. In 1975, Hurley was elected chair of the International Commission on English in the Liturgy (ICEL), a post to which he was re-elected until 1991. His work with Msgr. Frederick McManus of Catholic University in Washington led to a plan that a number of English speaking conferences would join together to prepare a single text for proposed use all over the world. In 1965 Pope Paul VI named Hurley to the Consilium (Council for the Implementation of the Constitution on the Sacred Liturgy). In 1975 as ICEL chairman, he oversaw the completion of the four-volume breviary. Hurley frequently registered his disappointment at the reorganisation of ICEL under the auspices of the newly established Vatican office Vox Clara, as mandated by Pope John Paul II's instruction Liturgiam authenticam.

== South African political involvement ==
According to Anthony Egan, "Prohibited during Dutch rule, coolly tolerated by the British, and treated with intense suspicion after the Union of South Africa in 1910, the Church was (unsurprisingly) cautious in challenging apartheid. With the majority of its clergy foreign-born and thus vulnerable to deportation, it was encouraged even by the Vatican to ‘play it safe’ after the 1948 National Party election victory. But Hurley, a white South African by birth, ... thought differently." Hurley was an outspoken opponent of apartheid, and was a driving force in a 1957 declaration by the bishops of South Africa that described apartheid as "intrinsically evil". In the late 1970s Hurley held a daily silent protest, standing in front of the central Durban Post Office for a period each day with a placard expressing his opposition to apartheid and the displacement of people from their homes. In 1984 Hurley was charged with contravening the South African police act by publishing information which the government alleged to be untrue about atrocities committed in Namibia by the South African military unit known as Koevoet. He received many death threats and was at times subject to house arrest. On three occasions bombs went off near his residence. The state withdrew the charges later and settled a claim by the Archbishop for damages out of court, paying him R 25,000. Due to his commitment to social justice, the Denis Hurley Peace Institute, an associate body of the Southern African Catholic Bishops Conference, was named in his honour. Hurley also worked to assist young men who for reasons of conscience were opposed to joining the South African military.

== The Hurley Case ==
A lawsuit, known as The Hurley Case, managed to secure the release of Paddy Kearney, a political opponent of the ruling National Party detained under Section 29 of the Internal Security Act. According to South African law professor Tony Mathews, the case "Hurley and Another vs the Minister of Law and Order" became "the most important civil rights ruling for several decades" and is still taught in law schools today.

Hurley became actively involved, turning up in black communities the day they were due to be forcibly removed. On hearing that children had died shortly after one such removal, Hurley counted their graves and recorded their names and ages. Then he released the details to the press, much to the fury of the state. In response to the weak response of South Africa's churches to apartheid, Hurley founded an ecumenical agency, Diakonia, dedicated to social justice. Hurley said his greatest struggle was convincing South African Catholics that social justice was integral to their faith rather than an optional extra. Hurley was nicknamed Mehl'emamba (Eyes of the Mamba) by appreciative Zulus.

== Thomas More College ==
Hurley played a key role in supporting Chris Hurley (his brother) and Robin Savory in founding Thomas More College. His brother Chris later became the second headmaster of the school. Archbishop Hurley also wrote the school song, "God Our Maker". There is a memorial garden dedicated to him located on the school grounds.

== Last years ==
On retiring as Archbishop of Durban in 1992, Hurley became chancellor of the University of Natal from 1993 to 1998. He also served as a parish priest for ten years at Emmanuel Cathedral, Durban, where he had officiated so many years earlier as a curate.

Hurley was seen by some as a "liberal". Many believe that his respectful and very careful questioning of Humanae Vitae in 1968 made the cardinalate an impossibility.

In 2002 Hurley retired to write his memoirs. He also spent his time writing letters to The Times debating the finer points of cricket, and composing the words for new hymns. The final article to be published in his lifetime was a guest editorial in the Christmas 2003 edition of "The Southern Cross", headlined "God's special gift to us". Hurley died as he was being driven back to the Oblate retirement community in Durban after a celebration of the 50th anniversary of a school at whose dedication he had presided as a young archbishop.

== Honours ==
Hurley received the following honours during his lifetime:

Year	Honorary Degrees	Civilian Honour
1970	Doctor of Laws, Notre Dame University, Indiana	
1972		Civic Honours, City of Durban
1975		Chevalier of the Legion of Honour (Légion d'honneur) France
1978	Doctor of Laws, University of Natal, Durban	
1982	Doctor of Humane Letters, Catholic University of America, Washington, DC	
1986	Doctor of Laws, De Paul University, Chicago	
1986	Doctor of Sacred Theology, Santa Clara University, California	
1987	Doctor of Humane Letters, Georgetown University, Washington, DC	
1988	Doctor of Social Sciences, University of Cape Town, Cape Town	
1988	Doctorate, University of Leuven, Belgium	
1992		Freedom of the City of Durban
1992		Freedom of the City of Pietermaritzburg
1993	Doctorate, Catholic Theological Union, Chicago	
1996	Doctorate, Saint Paul's University, Ottawa	
1992		Order of Merit of the Italian Republic (Onorificenza de Grande Ufficiale)
1992		Order of Meritorious Service (1st Class), South Africa

== Legacy ==
According to Gerald Shaw writing for The Guardian, "It was in part due to his sustained moral crusade and that of other churchmen that the transition to democracy, when it came in 1994, was accepted by white people in peace and good order."

The Archdiocese of Durban's Archbishop Denis Hurley Memorial Fund was set up in favor of two favorite projects of Archbishop Hurley: Kwa Thintwa School for the Deaf and San Egidio Community Project in Mozambique. There is a bronze statue of Hurley at the Kwa Thintwa School, KZN commissioned by the Premier of KwaZulu-Natal, Dr Zweli Mkhize.

The Denis Hurley Association of is a UK registered charity established in London "to promote and raise funds for the Denis Hurley Centre in Durban, South Africa". The Centre is planned as home to about a dozen projects to provide medical care, a soup kitchen, job training, support for people living with HIV/AIDS and in particular will offer assistance to refugees, migrants, who have reached South Africa from afar afield as Somalia, Zimbabwe and the Democratic Republic of Congo.

In 2017, a shrine to Hurley was opened at Durban's Emmanuel Cathedral and his successor, Cardinal Wilfred Napier, published a prayer soliciting Hurley's intercession and expressed a desire for an official sainthood cause to be opened for him in the archdiocese.

== Sources ==
- Denis O.P, P., Facing the Crisis Selected Texts of Archbishop D.E. Hurley (Cluster Publications, 1997). ISBN 1-875053-08-5
- Gamley, A. Denis Hurley A Portrait by Friends (Cluster Publications, 2001). ISBN 1-875053-29-8
- Kearney, P Memories: The memoirs of Archbishop Denis E Hurley OMI (Cluster Publications, 2006). ISBN 1-875053-53-0
