= John Rooney (bishop) =

Irish-born Roman Catholic bishop (1844–1927)

- Vicar Apostolic of Cape of Good Hope, Western District
- Church: Catholic Church
- See: Apostolic Vicariate of Cape of Good Hope, Western District
- In office: 19 February 1908 – December 1924
- Predecessor: John Leonard
- Successor: Bernard Cornelius O'Riley
- Other post: Titular Bishop of Sergiopolis (1886-1927)
- Previous posts: Coadjutor Vicar Apostolic of Cape of Good Hope, Western District (1886-1908)

Orders
- Ordination: 25 June 1867
- Consecration: 19 September 1886 by John Leonard

Personal details
- Born: 26 January 1844 Edenderry, County Offaly, United Kingdom of Great Britain and Ireland
- Died: 26 February 1927 (aged 83)

Bishop John Rooney VG, was an Irish-born Roman Catholic priest who served as bishop in South Africa.

Rooney was born in 1844 in Edenderry, County Offaly, he attended Carlow College before going to All Hallows College in Dublin, to be trained as priest for the Cape of Good Hope Diocese. Following All Hallows, he studied at Propaganda College in Rome. He was ordained a priest in 1867. He was in 1886 ordained titular Bishop of Sergiopolis, and coadjutor to Bishop John Leonard, whom he succeeded in 1908 as Bishop of Cape Colony, South Africa. He resigned as bishop in 1925.
