= Owen McCann =

South African cardinal (1907–1994)

His Eminence Owen McCann
- Cardinal, Archbishop Emeritus of Cape Town
- Church: Catholic Church
- Archdiocese: Cape Town
- Appointed: 11 January 1951
- Term ended: 20 October 1984
- Predecessor: Francis Hennemann
- Successor: Stephen Naidoo
- Other post: Cardinal-Priest of Santa Prassede (1965-94)
- Previous posts: Titular Bishop of Stectorium (1950-51); Vicar Apostolic of Cape Town (1950-51)

Orders
- Ordination: 21 December 1935
- Consecration: 18 May 1950 by Martin Lucas
- Created cardinal: 22 February 1965 by Paul VI
- Rank: Cardinal-Priest

Personal details
- Born: 26 June 1907 Woodstock, Cape Town, Cape Colony (now Western Cape, South Africa)
- Died: 26 March 1994 (aged 86) Wynberg, Cape Town, South Africa
- Education: University of Cape Town; Pontifical Urbaniana University
- Motto: Nisi Dominus in vanum
- Coat of arms

Owen McCann (26 June 1907 – 26 March 1994) was a South African cardinal of the Roman Catholic Church and journalist. He served as Archbishop of Cape Town from 1950 to 1984 (the first year as Apostolic Vicar) and was elevated to the cardinalate in 1965.

== Biography ==
Owen McCann was born in Woodstock in Cape Town, and studied at Saint Joseph College in Rondebosch, University of Cape Town, and Pontifical Urbaniana University in Rome. He was ordained to the priesthood on 21 December 1935. In 1941, he became editor of "The Southern Cross", South Africa's national Catholic newspaper, and held this post until 1948; he again became editor in 1986, this time for a five-year period. He did pastoral work in Cape Town from 1948 to 1950.

On 12 March 1950, McCann was appointed apostolic vicariate of Cape Town and titular bishop of Stectorium. He received his episcopal consecration on the following 18 May from Archbishop Martin Lucas, SVD, nuncio to South Africa. Upon Cape Town's elevation to a diocese on 11 January 1951, McCann was appointed Archbishop of Cape Town, the first of metropolitan rank. Between 1961 and 1974, he served as President of the Southern African Catholic Bishops Conference (SACBC). McCann attended the Second Vatican Council, at which he was elected to the Commission for Bishops and made four written and four oral submissions in his own name and five written ones as president of the SACBC.

McCann was created cardinal priest of Santa Prassede by Pope Paul VI in the consistory of 22 February 1965, becoming the first South African to receive the red hat. He was one of the cardinal electors who participated in the August 1978 papal conclave, which selected Albino Luciani as Pope John Paul I, and the October 1978 papal conclave, which selected Cardinal Karol Wojtyla as Pope John Paul II. McCann was reportedly a supporter of Giovanni Benelli at the latter conclave, but still gave his praise to the newly elected Wojtyla. Cardinal McCann retired as Archbishop of Cape Town on 20 October 1984.

He died on 26 March 1994 at age 86, and is buried in the archdiocesan cathedral. President Nelson Mandela, in an official condolence statement on the following 28 March, described Cardinal McCann as "one of South Africa's great sons" and "a man of great ability and wisdom".
