= Archdiocese of Cape Town (Catholic) =

Latin Catholic archdiocese in South Africa

Coordinates: 33°55′42″S 18°25′10″E

Archdiocese of Cape Town Sedis Archiepiscopalis Capetownensis
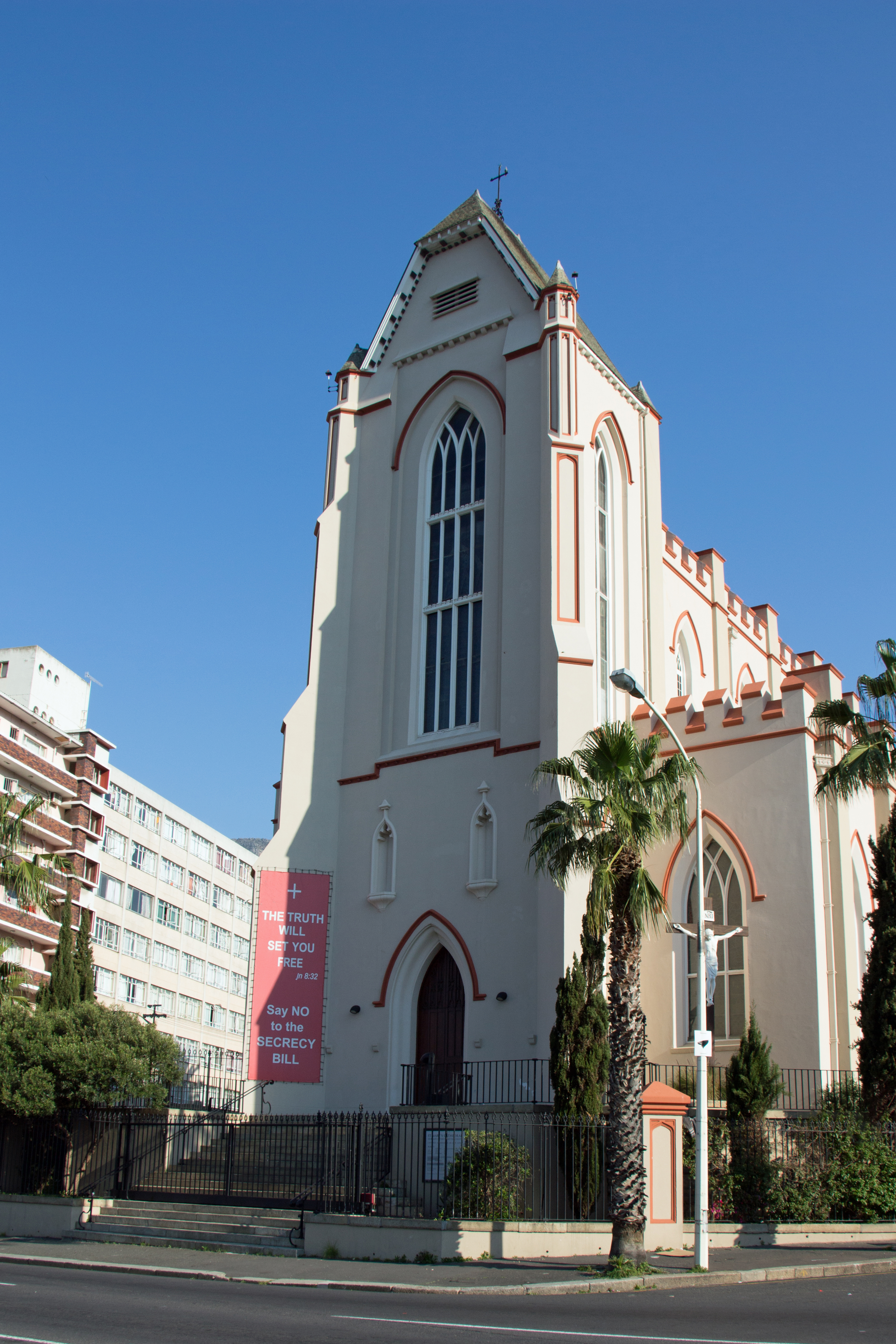
- Cathedral of St. Mary of the Flight into Egypt

Location
- Country: South Africa
- Territory: City of Cape Town, municipalities of Swartland, Saldanha Bay, Bergrivier, Cederberg, Drakenstein, Stellenbosch, Theewaterskloof, Overstrand, and Cape Agulhas
- Episcopal conference: Southern African Catholic Bishops' Conference
- Deaneries: 8

Statistics
- Area: 30,892 km^{2} (11,927 sq mi)
- Population: Total; Catholics: (as of 2023); 4,975,701; 276,415 (5.6%)
- Parishes: 74

Information
- Denomination: Catholic Church
- Sui iuris church: Latin Church
- Rite: Roman Rite
- Established: January 18, 1951; 75 years ago
- Cathedral: The Cathedral of Our Lady of the Flight into Egypt
- Patron saint: Our Lady of the Flight Into Egypt, St. Patrick
- Secular priests: 72

Current leadership
- Pope: Leo XIV
- Metropolitan Archbishop: Sithembele Anton Sipuka (Archbishop-Elect)
- Auxiliary Bishops: Sylvester Anthony John David

Map

Website
- https://adct.org.za/

The Archdiocese of Cape Town (Latin: Sedis Archiepiscopalis Capetownensis) is a Latin Catholic ecclesiastical jurisdiction or archdiocese of the Catholic Church located in Cape Town, in the south-western region of South Africa. The principal church of the archdiocese and the location of the archbishop's cathedra is the Cathedral of St. Mary of the Flight into Egypt, which also serves as the patroness saint for the archdiocese.

== History ==
The Archdiocese of Cape Town has a rich history that dates back to its establishment as the Apostolic Vicariate of Cape of Good Hope (and adjacent territories) on June 18, 1818, by Pope Pius VII. It was formed by splitting off territories from the then-Territorial Prelature of Mozambique and the Diocese of Tomé.

On April 4, 1819, it expanded its territory by gaining land from the suppressed Apostolic Prefecture of New Holland.

Over the years, it underwent several changes in its territorial boundaries. In 1834, the Apostolic Vicariate of New Holland and Van Diemen's Land was established, resulting in a reduction of territory. Additionally, on June 6, 1837, the Apostolic Vicariate of Mauritius was formed, further reducing the Archdiocese's territory.

It was renamed the Apostolic Vicariate of Cape of Good Hope, Western District on 30 July 1847, losing territory to establish the Apostolic Vicariate of Cape of Good Hope, Eastern District.

On 3 August 1874, it ceded territory to establish the Apostolic Prefecture of Cape of Good Hope, Central District.

It was renamed the Apostolic Vicariate of Cape Town on 13 June 1939 and Pope Pius XII elevated it to the rank of a metropolitan archdiocese on 11 January 1951.

On 18 August 1986, it ceded territory to the Mission sui juris of Saint Helena, Ascension and Tristan da Cunha, off Africa's Atlantic Coast.

== Extent ==
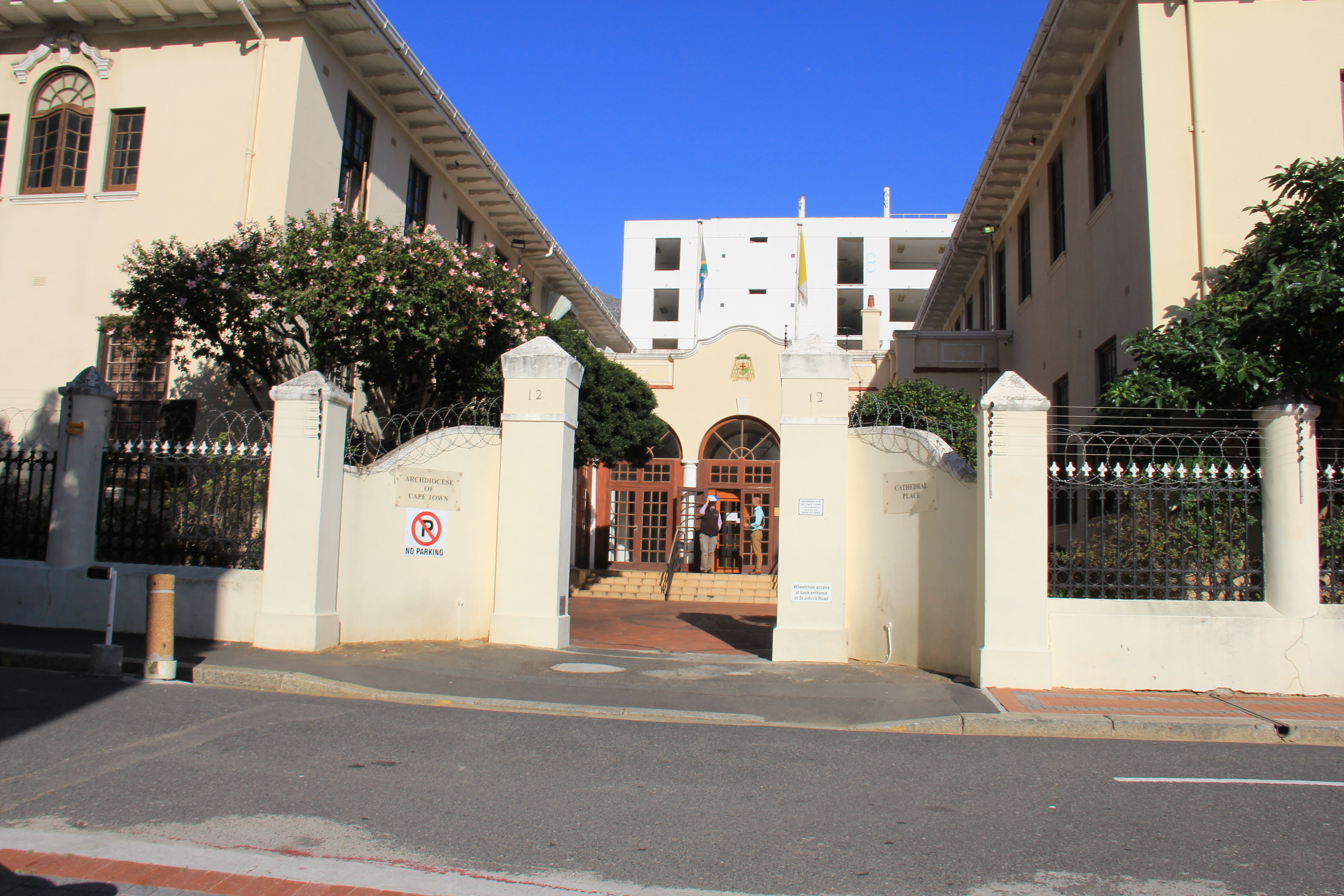
Chancery of the Archdiocese

The Archdiocese of Cape Town encompasses a vast geographical area, which is divided into 73 parishes. Each parish is mandated to have its own pastoral council and finance council. Representatives from these parish councils, along with members of other bodies, collectively constitute the Archdiocesan Pastoral Council. This council's primary responsibility is to provide advice to the archbishop on specific matters.

The archdiocese covers a total area of 30,892 square kilometres (11,927 sq mi) and is home to a population of 3 324 539 people, with 215 187 adhering to the Catholic faith. The administrative hub of the archdiocese is known as the Chancery and is situated at 12 Bouquet Street in Cape Town.

Geographically, the archdiocese is centered around the city of Cape Town and encompasses the southernmost tip of the African continent. It is bordered by the Atlantic Ocean to the west, the southern boundaries of the Van Rhynsdorp district to the north, the western boundaries of the Calvinia, Ceres, Tulbagh, Worcester, Robertson, and Swellendam districts to the east, and the Indian Ocean to the south. The civil districts within the ecclesiastical jurisdiction of the archdiocese include Cape, Wynberg, Simon's Town, Bellville, Somerset West, Stellenbosch, Paarl, Wellington, Caledon, Bredasdorp, Malmesbury, Piketberg, and Clanwilliam.

== Province ==
The ecclesiastical province comprises the metropolitan's own archdiocese and the suffragan sees :

- Diocese of Aliwal
- Diocese of De Aar
- Diocese of Oudtshoorn
- Diocese of Port Elizabeth
- Diocese of Queenstown.

== Bishops ==
=== Ordinaries of Cape Town ===
==== Apostolic Vicars of Cape of Good Hope and adjacent territories ====
- Edward Bede Slater (1818.06.18 – 1831; died 1832), Titular Bishop of Ruspæ (1818.06.18 – 1832.07.15)
- William Placid Morris (1831.08.09 – 1837.06.06), later Apostolic Vicar of Mauritius (Mauritius) (1837.06.06 – 1840); remained Titular Bishop of Troas (1831.08.09 – 1872.02.18)
- Patrick Raymond Griffith, Titular Bishop of Paleopolis (Asia Minor) (1837.06.06 – 1862.06.18) (6 June 1837 – 1847.07.30 see below)

==== Apostolic Vicars of Cape of Good Hope, Western District ====
- Patrick Raymond Griffith, (see above 1847.07.30 – 18 June 1862)
- Thomas Grimley (18 June 1862 - 1871.01.29), Titular Bishop of Antigonea (1860.12.18 – 1871.01.29); succeeding as former Coadjutor Apostolic Vicar of Cape of Good Hope, Western District (1860.12.18 – 1862.06.18)
- John Leonard (1872.10.1 – 19 February 1908), Titular Bishop of Charadrus (1872.10.01 – 1908.02.19)
- John Rooney (1908.02.19 – 1925), Titular Bishop of Sergiopolis (antea Resapha) (1886.01.29 – 1927.02.26); succeeding as previous Coadjutor Vicar Apostolic of Cape of Good Hope, Western District (1886.01.29 – 1908.02.19)
- Bernard Cornelius O'Riley (1925.07.15 – 1932.06.06), Titular Bishop of Phoba (1925.07.15 – 1956.07.21)
- Franziskus Hennemann (1933.06.30 – 1939.06.13 see below), Titular Bishop of Coptus (1913.07.16 – 1951.01.17); previously djutor Vicar Apostolic of Cameroun (Cameroon) (1913.07.16 – 1914.11.07), succeeding as Vicar Apostolic of Cameroun (Cameroon) (1914.11.07 – 1922.06.26), next Apostolic Prefect of Cape of Good Hope, Central District (1922.06.26 – 1933.06.30)

==== Apostolic Vicars of Cape Town ====
- Franziskus Hennemann (see above 1939.06.13 – 1949; died 1951)
- Owen McCann (1950.03.12 – 1951.01.10 see below), Titular Bishop of Stectorium (1950.03.12 – 1951.01.11)

==== Metropolitan Archbishops of Cape Town ====
- Owen McCann (see above 1951.01.11 – 1984.10.20; died 1994), also President of the Inter-Regional Meeting of Bishops of Southern Africa (1961 – 1974), Cardinal-Priest of S. Prassede (1965.02.25 – 1994.03.26), President of the Southern African Catholic Bishops' Conference (1967 – 1974)
- Stephen Naidoo (1984.10.20 – 1989.07.01); previously Titular Bishop of Mammilla (1974.07.01 – 1974.08.02); Auxiliary Bishop of Cape Town (1974.07.01 – 1984.10.20), Titular Bishop of Aquæ Flaviæ (1974.08.02 – 1984.10.20)
- Lawrence Patrick Henry (1990.07.07 – 2009.12.18), previously Titular Bishop of Cenculiana (1987.04.27 – 1990.07.07) & Auxiliary Bishop of Cape Town (1987.04.27 – 1990.07.07)
- Stephen Brislin (2009.12.18– 2024.10.27), also President of Inter-Regional Meeting of Bishops of Southern Africa (2012.08 – 2016.10), President of Southern African Catholic Bishops' Conference (2013.02 – 2019.02); previously Bishop of Kroonstad (South Africa) (2006.10.17 – 2009.12.18), Cardinal-Priest of Santa Maria Domenica Mazzarello (2023.09.30 – )
- Sithembele Anton Sipuka (appointed 9 January 2026)

=== Coadjutor Vicars Apostolic ===
- Thomas Grimley (1860–1862)
- John Rooney (1886–1908)

=== Auxiliary Bishops ===
- Sylvester Anthony John David (since 6 June 2019)
- Reginald Cawcutt (1992–2002), died 2022
- Lawrence Patrick Henry (1987–1990), appointed Archbishop here
- Stephen Naidoo (1974–1984), appointed Archbishop here

=== Other priests of this diocese who became bishops ===
- Francisco Fortunato de Gouveia, appointed Bishop of Oudtshoorn in 2010
- Ernest Arthur Green, appointed Bishop of Port Elizabeth in 1955
- Noel Andrew Rucastle, appointed Bishop of Oudtshoorn in 2020

== See also ==
- Catholic Church in South Africa
