= Victor Hlolo Phalana =

South African Catholic prelate (born 1961)

The Most Reverend Victor Hlolo Phalana
- Catholic Bishop of Klerksdorp, South Africa
- Church: Catholic Church
- Archdiocese: Archdiocese of Johannesburg
- See: Diocese of Klerksdorp
- Appointed: 24 November 2014
- Installed: 25 January 2015
- Predecessor: Zithulele Patrick Mvemve (26 March 1994 - 26 April 2013)
- Successor: Incumbent

Orders
- Ordination: 14 May 1988
- Consecration: 25 January 2015 by Arhbishop William Matthew Slattery
- Rank: Bishop

Personal details
- Born: Victor Hlolo Phalana; 3 April 1961 (age 65) Erasmus, North West Province, Archdiocese of Pretoria, South Africa

Styles of Victor Hlolo Phalana
- Reference style: Your Lordship; The Most Reverend
- Spoken style: His Lordship
- Religious style: Bishop

Victor Hlolo Phalana (born 3 April 1961) is a South African Roman Catholic prelate who serves as the bishop of Roman Catholic Diocese of Klerksdorp, in South Africa, since 24 November 2014. Before that, from 14 May 1988 until 24 November 2024, he served as a priest for the Roman Catholic Archdiocese of Pretoria. He was appointed bishop by Pope Francis. His episcopal consecration took place on 25 January 2015. The Principal Consecrator was William Matthew Slattery, Archbishop of Pretoria.

== Background and education ==
He was born on 3 April 1961 in Erasmus, North West Province, Archdiocese of Pretoria. He studied philosophy and theology at the St John Vianney Seminary, Pretoria. He studied at the Pontifical Gregorian University in Rome, Italy from 1993 until 1995, graduating with a degree in spirituality. In 1999, he studied at the Catholic University of Eastern Africa in Nairobi, Kenya where he took a course in African Cultures.

== Priest ==
He was ordained a priest on 14 May 1988, for the Archdiocese of Pretoria. He served as a priest until 24 November 2014. While a priest, he served in various roles and locations, including:

- Assistant priest of Saint Camillus, in Hammanskraal from 1988 until 1989.
- Pastor of Christ the King Church, Mabopane from 1989 until 1992.
- Professor at the Preparatory Seminary in Hammanskraal and Cape Town from 1992 until 1993.
- Studies at the Pontifical Gregorian University in Rome, Italy leading to the award of a Licentiate in Spiritual Theology from 1993 until 1995.
- Spiritual Director of the Saint Peter Philosophical Seminary from 1995 until 1999.
- Professor at the Saint John Vianney Major Seminary in Pretoria from 1995 until 1999.
- Professor at the Pastoral Lumuko Institute from 1999 until 2004.
- Pastor of Good Shepherd and Saint Peter in Winterveld from 2004 until 2008.
- Administrator of the Cathedral of Pretoria Arhdiocese from 2007 until 2014.
- Vicar General of the Archdiocese of Pretoria from 2011 until 2014.

== Bishop ==
On 24 November 2014, Pope Francis appointed Reverend Father Victor Hlolo Phalana, previously the Vicar General of the Roman Catholic Archdiocese of Pretoria as Bishop of the Diocese of Klerksdorp, South Africa He received his episcopal consecration on 25 January 2015 by the hands of William Matthew Slattery, Archbishop of Pretoria assisted by Abel Gabuza, Bishop of Kimberley and Dabula Anthony Mpako, Bishop of Queenstown.

== See also ==
- Catholic Church in South Africa

== Succession table ==
Catholic Church titles
Preceded by Zithulele Patrick Mvemve (26 Marh 1994 - 26 April 2013)	Bishop of Klerksdorp (since 24 November 2014)	Succeeded by (Incumbent)
