= Lawrence Pheto =

Botswana Catholic prelate (born 1976)

The Most Reverend Lawrence Pheto
- Bishop of Francistown, Botswana
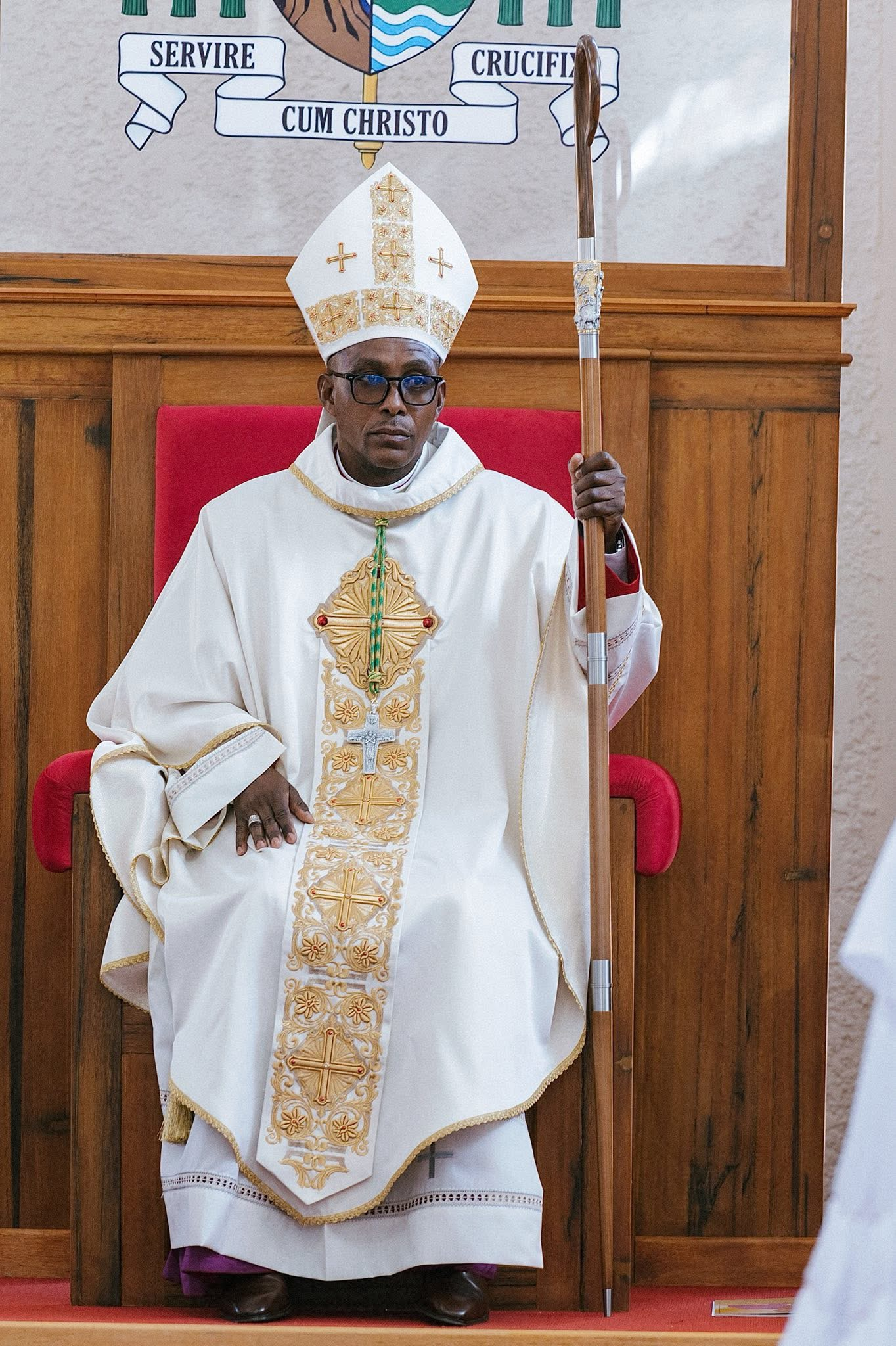
- Bishop Lawrence Ofentse Pheto seated on the cathedra after Canonical Installation , Francistown, Botswana, 2026
- Church: Catholic Church
- Archdiocese: Roman Catholic Archdiocese of Pretoria
- See: Diocese of Francistown
- Appointed: 10 April 2026
- Installed: 27 June 2026
- Predecessor: Anthony Pascal Rebello (5 July 2021 - 4 May 2024)
- Successor: Incumbent

Orders
- Ordination: 8 October 2005 by Boniface Tshosa Setlalekgosi
- Consecration: 27 June 2026 by Henryk Jagodziński
- Rank: Bishop

Personal details
- Born: Lawrence Ofentse Pheto; 12 March 1976 (age 50) Ramotswa, Diocese of Gaborone, Botswana
- Motto: "Servire cum Christo crucifixo" (To serve with Christ crucified)

Styles of Lawrence Ofentse Pheto
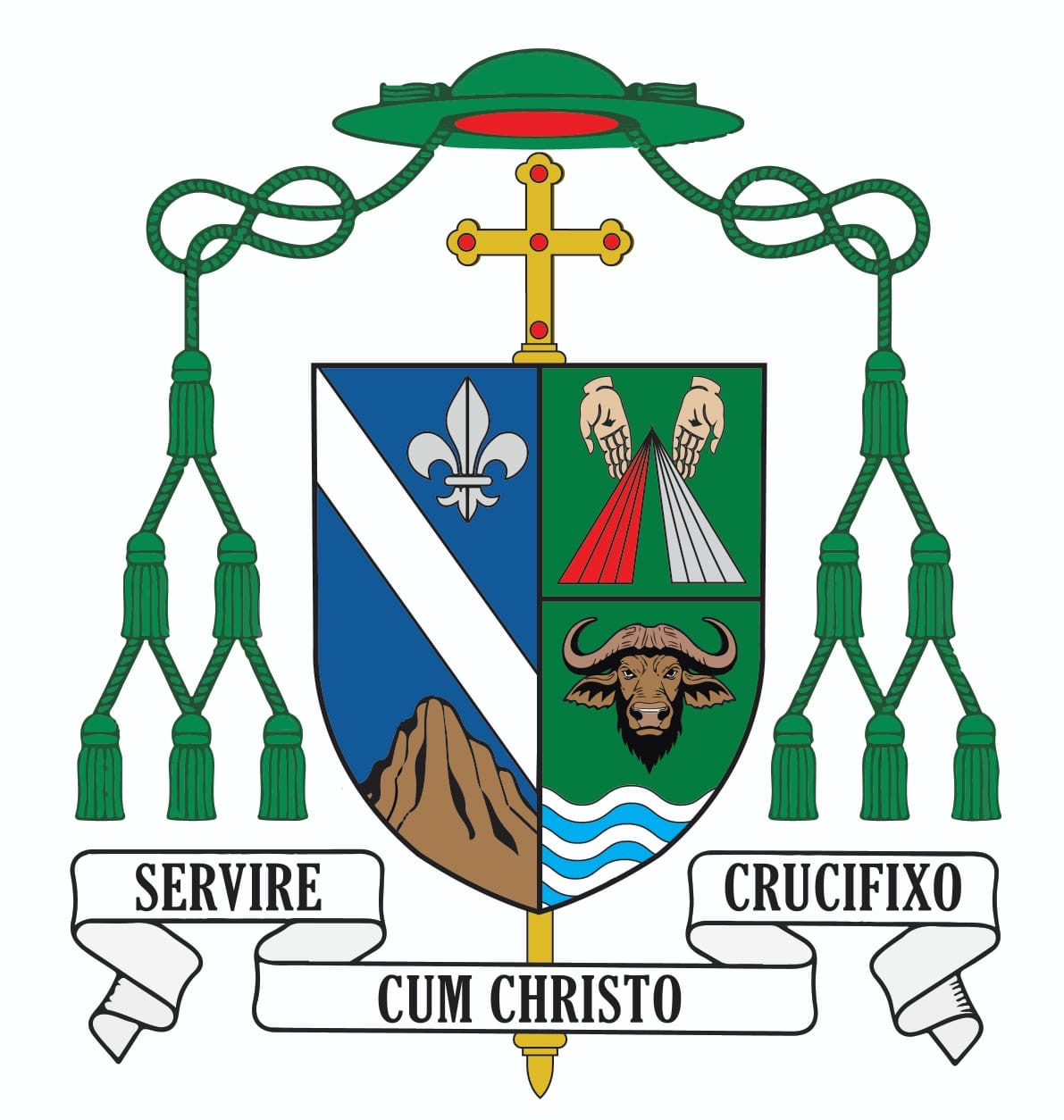
- Reference style: Your Lordship; The Most Reverend
- Spoken style: His Lordship
- Religious style: Bishop

Lawrence Ofentse Pheto (born 12 March 1976) is a Motswana Catholic prelate who was appointed bishop of the Roman Catholic Diocese of Francistown, in Botswana on 10 April 2026. Before that, from 8 October 2005 until 10 April 2026, he served as a priest of the Roman Catholic Diocese of Gaborone, Botswana. He was appointed bishop by Pope Leo XIV. His episcopal consecration took place at Francistown on 27 June 2026. The Principal Consecrator was Henryk Jagodziński, Titular Archbishop of Limosano and Papal Nuncio to Southern Africa.

== Early life and education ==
He was born on 12 March 1976 in Ramotswa, Diocese of Gaborone, in Botswana. He studied at the Saint Augustine Major Seminary in Bulawayo, Zimbabwe from 1998 until 2000. He earned a Diploma in Philosophy from there. His Diploma in Theology was awarded by the Chishawasha Regional Major Seminary in Harare, Zimbabwe, where he studied from 2001 until 2005. Later, from 2009 until 2012, he studied at the Pontifical Urban University, in Rome, Italy where he graduated with a Licentiate in Canon Law.

== Priest ==
He was ordained a priest at Saint Conrad's Catholic Mission in Ramotswa, for the Diocese of Gaborone on 8 October 2005 by Boniface Tshosa Setlalekgosi, Bishop of Gaborone. Father Lawrence Ofentse Pheto served as a priest until 10 April 2026. While a priest, he served in various roles and locations, including:

- Assistant parish priest of Saint Theresa's Parish in Lobatse, Gaborone in 2006.
- Parish Priest of the Holy Cross Parish, Gaborone from 2006 until 2008.
- Rector of the Charles Lwanga Minor Seminary, Gaborone in 2008.
- Studies in Rome, Italy at the Pontifical Urban University leading to the award of a Licentiate in Canon Law from 2009 until 2012.
- Parish Priest of Tsholofelong, Tlokweng, Gaborone from 2012 until 2014.
- Rector of the Charles Lwanga Minor Seminary, Gaborone from 2014 until 2017.
- Parish Priest of Saint Theresa Parish in Lobatse, Gaborone from 2017 until 2026.
- Judicial Vicar for the Diocesan Matrimonial Tribunal from 2017 until 2026.

== Bishop ==
On 10 April 2026, Pope Leo XIV appointed Reverend Father Lawrence Ofentse Pheto, previously a member of the clergy of Gaborone as the bishop of the Francistown Catholic Diocese. He succeeded the late Bishop Anthony Pascal Rebello, who died in office on 4 May 2024. The episcopal consecration of the new bishop-elect is scheduled on 27 June 2026. He was consecrated on 27 June 2026 by Henryk Jagodziński, Titular Archbishop Limosano and Apostolic Nuncio to Southern Africa.

== See also ==
- Catholic Church in Botswana

== Succession table ==
Catholic Church titles
Preceded by Anthony Pascal Rebello (5 July 2021 - 4 May 2024)	Bishop of Francistown (since 10 April 2026)	Succeeded by (Incumbent)
