= Franklyn Atese Nubuasah =

Ghanaian-born Catholic prelate (born 1949

The Most Reverend Franklyn Atese Nubuasah
- Bishop of Gaborone, Botswana
- Church: Catholic Church
- Archdiocese: Roman Catholic Archdiocese of Pretoria
- See: Gaborone
- Appointed: 6 June 2019
- Installed: 17 August 2019
- Predecessor: Valentine Tsamma Seane
- Successor: Incumbent

Orders
- Ordination: 26 July 1980
- Consecration: 7 November 1998 by Boniface Tshosa Setlalekgosi
- Rank: Bishop

Personal details
- Born: Franklyn Atese Nubuasah; 7 July 1949 (age 77) Likpe Agbozume, Ghana

Styles of Franklyn Atese Nubuasah
- Reference style: Your Grace; The Most Reverend
- Spoken style: His Grace
- Religious style: Bishop

Franklyn Atese Nubuasah (born 7 July 1949), also Frank Atese Nubuasah, is a Ghanaian-born Roman Catholic prelate who became the Bishop of Gaborone, Botswana 2019. Before that, he was the Bishop of Francistown, Botswana (2017–2019) and Apostolic Vicar of the Apostolic Vicariate of Francistown (1998–2017). He was appointed Bishop on 27 June 1998 by Pope John Paul II, and elevated to the rank of Archbishop (personal title) on 5 July 2021 by Pope Francis.

== Background and priesthood ==
He was born on 7 July 1949 at Likpe Abozome, Ghana. He made his solemn vows as a member of the Society of the Divine Word (SVD) in 1979. He was ordained a priest of that Order on 26 July 1980. He served in that capacity until 27 June 1998. He served as the novice master of the Society of the Divine Word in Ghana from 1994 until 1998.

He was sent to the United States for further studies, where he earned a Master of Arts from Duquesne University in Pittsburgh.

== As bishop ==
On 27 June 1998, Pope John Paul II created the Apostolic Vicariate of Francistown, Botswana and appointed Franklyn Atese Nubuasah, S.V.D. as the founding Apostolic Vicar on the same day. He was concurrently appointed as Titular Bishop of Pauzera. He was consecrated and installed at Francistown on 7 November 1998 by the hands of Bishop Boniface Tshosa Setlalekgosi, Bishop of Gaborone assisted by Bishop Erwin Hecht, Bishop of Kimberley and Bishop Johannes Ludgerus Bonaventure Brenninkmeijer, Bishop of Kroonstad.

On 5 July 2021, Pope Francis appointed him Archbishop (Personal Title) of Gaborone, Botswana.

== See also ==
- Catholic Church in Botswana

== Succession table ==
Catholic Church titles
Preceded by None (Vicariate Created) (Before 27 Jun 1998)	Apostolic Vicar of Francistown (27 June 1998 - 2 October 2017)	Succeeded by None (Vicariate elevated to Diocese)
Preceded by None (Diocese Created) (Before 2 October 2017)	Bishop of Francistown (2 October 2017 - 6 June 2019)	Succeeded by Anthony Pascal Rebello
Preceded by Valentine Tsamma Seane (5 February 2009 - 9 August 2017)	Bishop of Gaborone (6 June 2019 - 5 July 2021)	Succeeded by Incumbent
Preceded by None (Personal Title Created) (5 Mar 2011 - 16 Nov 2019)	Archbishop of Gaborone (Personal Title) (since 5 July 2021)	Succeeded by None
