= Masilo John Selemela =

South African Catholic prelate (born 1972)

The Most Reverend Masilo John Selemela
- Auxiliary Bishop of Pretoria, South Africa
- Church: Catholic Church
- Archdiocese: Catholic Archdiocese of Pretoria
- See: Pretoria
- Appointed: 16 July 2022
- Installed: 3 September 2022
- Other post: Titular Bishop of Nachingwea (since 16 July 2022)

Orders
- Ordination: 12 June 1999
- Consecration: 3 September 2022 by Dabula Anthony Mpako
- Rank: Bishop

Personal details
- Born: Masilo John Selemela; 13 January 1972 (age 54) Magoebaskloof, Diocese of Tzaneen, Limpopo, South Africa

Styles of Masilo John Selemela
- Reference style: Your Lordship; The Most Reverend
- Spoken style: His Lordship
- Religious style: Bishop

Masilo John Selemela (born 13 January 1972) is a South African Catholic prelate who serves as auxiliary bishop of the Roman Catholic Archdiocese of Pretoria, in the Republic of South Africa since 16 July 2022. He was appointed bishop by Pope Francis. Before that, from 12 June 1999 until 16 July 2022, he was a priest of the Catholic Diocese of Tzaneen. He was concentrated bishop in Pretoria, by Dabula Anthony Mpako, Archbishop of Pretoria on 3 September 2022. While auxiliary bishop, he concurrently serves as Titular Bishop of Nachingwea.

== Background and education ==
He was born on 13 January 1972 in Magoebaskloof, Diocese of Tzaneen, Limpopo, in South Africa. He studied at the Saint Paul's Minor Seminary for his propaedeutic year in 1991. He studied philosophy at the Saint Peter's Major Seminary in Hammanskraal, Gauteng from 1992 until 1993. He studied theology at the St John Vianney Seminary, Pretoria from 1994 until 1998. He studied in Rome, Italy from 2006 until 2011, graduating with a Licentiate and a Doctorate in Dogmatic Theology from the Pontifical Urban University and a Diploma in "Canonical Administrative Practice" from the Dicastery for the Clergy.

== Priesthood ==
On 12 June 1999, he was ordained a priest for the Diocese of Tzaneen. He served as a priest until 16 July 2022. While a priest, he served in various roles and locations, including:

- Parish Vicar of Our Lady of Peace in Louis Trichardt from 1999 until 2004.
- Diocesan Vice-director of the pastoral care of vocations and youth from 1999 until 2004.
- Parish Vicar of Dwars River Parish and Diocesan Youth Chaplain from 2004 until 2006.
- Diocesan Director of Vocation Ministry and Coordinator of the Education for Life program from 2004 until 2006.
- Vice-president of the Diocesan Committee for Finance from 2004 until 2006.
- Chaplain of Saint Brendan's School from 2004 until 2006.
- Studies in Rome, Italy at the Pontifical Urban University and the Dicastery for the Clergy, leading to the award of a Licentiate and Doctorate in dogmatic theology and a diploma in "Canonical Administrative Practice" from 2006 until 2011.
- Professor, Vice-Rector and formator at the Saint John Vianney National Major Seminary in Pretoria from 2011 until 2019.
- Rector of the Saint John Vianney Seminary, Pretoria from 2019 until 2022.

== As bishop ==
On 16 July 2022, Pope Francis appointed Reverend Father Monsignor Masilo John Selemela, of the clergy of Tzaneen, as Auxiliary Bishop of the Ecclesiastical Metropolitan Province of Pretoria. He was concurrently assigned as Titular Bishop of Nachingwea. He was consecrated at Pretoria on 3 September 2022. The Principal Consecrator was Dabula Anthony Mpako, Archbishop of Pretoria assisted by João Noé Rodrigues, Bishop of Tzaneen and Vincent Mduduzi Zungu, Bishop of Port Elizabeth. Bishop Masilo John Selemela continues to serve in that capacity.

== See also ==
- Catholic Church in South Africa

== Succession table ==
Catholic Church titles
Preceded by	Auxiliary Bishop of Pretoria (since 16 July 2022)	Succeeded by
