= Joao Noe Rodrigues =

- Church: Roman Catholic church
- Archdiocese: Archdiocese of Pretoria
- Diocese: Diocese of Tzaneen

Orders
- Ordination: 18 April 2010 by Pope Benedict XVI

Personal details
- Born: 8 March 1955 (age 71) Cape Town, South Africa
- Education: St John Vianney Seminary, Pretoria

Joao Noe Rodrigues (born 8 March 1955, Cape Town) is a South African Catholic bishop. He is the bishop of Tzaneen Diocese.

== Life ==
Rodrigues attended St John Vianney Seminary in Pretoria from 1974 to 1982. He was ordained as a priest on 4 July 1982 at Corpus Christi church in the Archdiocese of Cape Town by Cardinal Owen McCann for the Diocese of Witbank.

He served as a military chaplain (1983–1984) in Pretoria and later as Assistant priest at Sacred Heart Parish in Witbank/Emalahleni (1985–1988). He earned a Licentiate in Dogmatic Theology from the Pontifical Urban University in Rome (1988–1990) and also completed a Master of Arts in Spirituality at Santa Clara University in California (2003–2005)

He served as a lecturer and Vice-Rector at St John Vianney Seminary (1990–1993) in Pretoria. He served as parish priest of Sacred Heart Parish (1994–1996), then priest administrator of the Cathedral of Christ the King (1997–2003) He held roles as chaplain to Witbank Hospital, spiritual advisor to the Sodality of the Women of St Anne, diocesan coordinator for catechetics, and member of the College of Consultors (1994–2003)He served again as Parish Priest of Sacred Heart Parish again from 2005 to 2009 and was appointed Bishop of the Diocese of Tzaneen on 28 January 2010 by Pope Benedict XVI.

He was ordained bishop on 18 April 2010 at Ave Maria Pastoral Centre in Mooketsi, Limpopo Province, South Africa.

He speaks Portuguese, Afrikaans, English, Italian, and isiZulu; also reads seSothosa Lebowa, xiTsonga, and TshiVenda — all languages of his diocese.
