= Military Ordinariate of the South African Defence Force =

Catholic ecclesiastical jurisdiction in South Africa

Military Ordinariate of South Africa Ordinariatus Militaris Africa Australis

Location
- Country: South Africa

Information
- Denomination: Catholic Church
- Sui iuris church: Latin Church
- Rite: Roman Rite
- Established: 17 May 1951 (75 years ago)

Current leadership
- Pope: Leo XIV
- Archbishop: Dabula Anthony Mpako

The Military Ordinariate of the South African (National) Defence Force (or of South Africa) is a military ordinariate of the Catholic Church that provides pastoral care to Catholics serving in the South African National Defence Force and their families.

It is exempt, i.e. immediately subject to the Holy See, not part of any ecclesiastical province. Since its inception, it has been held by the Metropolitan Archbishops of South Africa's national capital Pretoria (where it is headquartered) and has no proper episcopal see of its own.

As per 2014, it comprises a single parish and only eight 'diocesan' (secular) priests. The current incumbent is the Metropolita Dabula Anthony Mpako, since 30 April 2019.

== History ==
It was established as Military vicariate of the South African Defence Force on 17 May 1951. It originally provided chaplains to the South African Defence Force.

It was promoted as Military Ordinariate of the South African Defence Force on 21 July 1986. Following the dismantling of the apartheid system it now provides chaplains to the South African National Defence Force.

== Episcopal ordinaries ==
(all Roman Rite)

=== Military Vicars ===
- John Colburn Garner (appointed 17 May 1951 – resigned 26 March 1976), while first Metropolitan Archbishop of Pretoria (South Africa) (1951.01.11 – 1975.04.28); previously Titular Bishop of Tracula (1948.04.09 – 1951.01.11) and last Apostolic Vicar of Pretoria (South Africa) (1948.04.09 – 1951.01.11)
- George Francis Daniel (appointed last Military Vicar 26 March 1976 – 21 July 1986 see below), while Metropolitan Archbishop of Pretoria (1975.04.28 – 2008.11.24)

=== Military Ordinaries ===
- George Francis Daniel (see above appointed first Military Ordinary 21 July 1986 – retired 24 November 2008)
- Paul Mandla Khumalo, Congregation of the Missionaries of Mariannhill (C.M.M.) (appointed 24 November 2008 – resigned 15 December 2009), while Metropolitan Archbishop of Pretoria (2008.11.24 – 2009.12.15); previously Bishop of Witbank (South Africa) (2001.10.02 – 2008.11.24)
- William Slattery, Order of Friars Minor (O.F.M.) (appointed 23 December 2010 – retired 30 April 2019), while Metropolitan Archbishop of Pretoria (South Africa) (2010.12.23 – 2019.04.30); previously Bishop of Kokstad (South Africa) (1993.11.17 – 2010.12.23)
- Dabula Anthony Mpako (appointed 30 April 2019 - ...), simultaneously appointed Metropolitan Archbishop of Pretoria; previously Bishop of Queenstown (23 May 2011 - 30 April 2019)

== See also ==
- List of Catholic dioceses in South Africa, Botswana and Swaziland

== Sources and external links ==
- South African Defence Force GCatholic.org - data for all sections
- Military Ordinariate of South Africa (Catholic-Hierarchy)
