= Hugh Patrick Slattery =

Irish Roman Catholic bishop (1934–2024)

His Excellency, The Most Reverend Hugh Patrick Slattery MSC
- Bishop Emeritus of Tzaneen
- Archdiocese: Pretoria
- Diocese: Tzaneen
- Appointed: 22 June 1984
- Term ended: 28 January 2010
- Predecessor: John Thomas Durkin
- Successor: João Noé Rodrigues

Orders
- Ordination: 16 July 1958
- Consecration: 30 September 1984 by Mogale Paul Nkhumishe

Personal details
- Born: 10 March 1934 Nenagh, Ireland
- Died: 6 October 2024 (aged 90) Pretoria, South Africa

Hugh Patrick Slattery, MSC (10 March 1934 – 6 October 2024) was an Irish Catholic prelate who served as Bishop of Tzaneen from 1984 to 2010. Slattery died on 6 October 2024, at the age of 90. He was a member of the Missionaries of the Sacred Heart of Jesus.

Catholic Church titles
Preceded by John Thomas Durkin	Bishop of Tzaneen; 1984–2010	Succeeded by João Noé Rodrigues
