= Xolelo Thaddaeus Kumalo =

South African Catholic prelate (born 1954)

The Most Reverend Xolelo Thaddaeus Kumalo
- Bishop of Witbank, South Africa
- Church: Catholic Church
- Archdiocese: Roman Catholic Archdiocese of Johannesburg
- See: Diocese of Witbank
- Appointed: 25 November 2020
- Installed: 20 March 2021
- Predecessor: Giuseppe Sandri
- Successor: Incumbent

Orders
- Ordination: 10 October 1991 by Hubert Bucher
- Consecration: 7 June 2008 by Hubert Bucher
- Rank: Bishop

Personal details
- Born: Xolelo Thaddaeus Kumalo; 2 July 1954 (age 71) Gogela, Umzimvubu, Diocese of Kokstad, Eastern Cape, South Africa

Styles of Xolelo Thaddaeus Kumalo
- Reference style: Your Lordship; The Most Reverend
- Spoken style: His Lordship
- Religious style: Bishop

Xolelo Thaddaeus Kumalo (born 2 July 1954) is a South African Catholic prelate who serves as bishop of the Roman Catholic Diocese of Witbank, in the Ecclesiastical Metropolitan Province of Johannesburg in South Africa since 25 November 2020. Before that, from 11 March 2008 until 25 November 2020, he was the bishop of the Roman Catholic Diocese of Eshowe in the Catholic Archdiocese of Durban. He was appointed bishop by Pope Benedict XVI. He was consecrated and installed at Eshowe on 7 June 2008 by Hubert Bucher, Bishop of Bethlehem, South Africa. On 25 November 2020, Pope Francis transferred him to the Diocese of Witbank and appointed him local ordinary there. He was installed at Witbank on 20 March 2021.

== Background and education ==
Xolelo Thaddaeus Kumalo was born on 2 July 1954 at Gogela, Umzimvubu, Diocese of Kokstad, Eastern Cape, in South Africa. He studied both philosophy and theology at seminary before he was ordained a priest. He studied at the Saint John Vianney National Major Seminary, in Pretoria, which is affiliated with the Pontifical Urban University, in Rome, Italy.

== Priest ==
He was ordained a priest for the Roman Catholic Diocese of Bethlehem, South Africa on 10 October 1991. He served as a priest until 11 March 2008. While a priest, he served in various roles and locations including the following, among others:

- Parochial Vicar of Hlohlolwane and Phuthaditjhaba in South Africa.
- Episcopal Vicar for Catechists.
- Rector of Saint John Paul II Formation Centre.
- Vicar General of the Catholic Diocese of Bethlehem in South Africa.

== Bishop ==
On 11 March 2008, Pope Benedict XVI appointed Reverend Father Xolelo Thaddaeus Kumalo, previously Vicar General of the Catholic Diocese of Bethlehem in South Africa, as the new bishop of the Diocese of Eshowe, South Africa. He was consecrated and installed at Eshowe on 7 June 2008 by Hubert Bucher, Bishop of Bethlehem assisted by Cardinal Wilfrid Fox Napier, Archbishop of Durban and Buti Joseph Tlhagale, Archbishop of Johannesburg. Pope Francis transferred Bishop Xolelo Thaddaeus Kumalo, previously the local ordinary at Eshowe to the Diocese of Witbank on 25 November 2020. He continues to serve as the local ordinary at Witbank.

== See also ==
- Catholic Church in South Africa

== Succession table ==
Catholic Church titles
Preceded by Giuseppe Sandri (6 November 2009 - 30 May 2019)	Bishop of Witbank (since 25 November 2020)	Succeeded by (Incumbent)
Preceded by Mansuet Dela Biyase (28 February 1975 - 1 July 2005)	Bishop of Eshowe (11 March 2008 - 25 November 2020)	Succeeded by Vacant
