= St. Patrick's Cathedral, Kokstad =

St. Patrick’s Cathedral
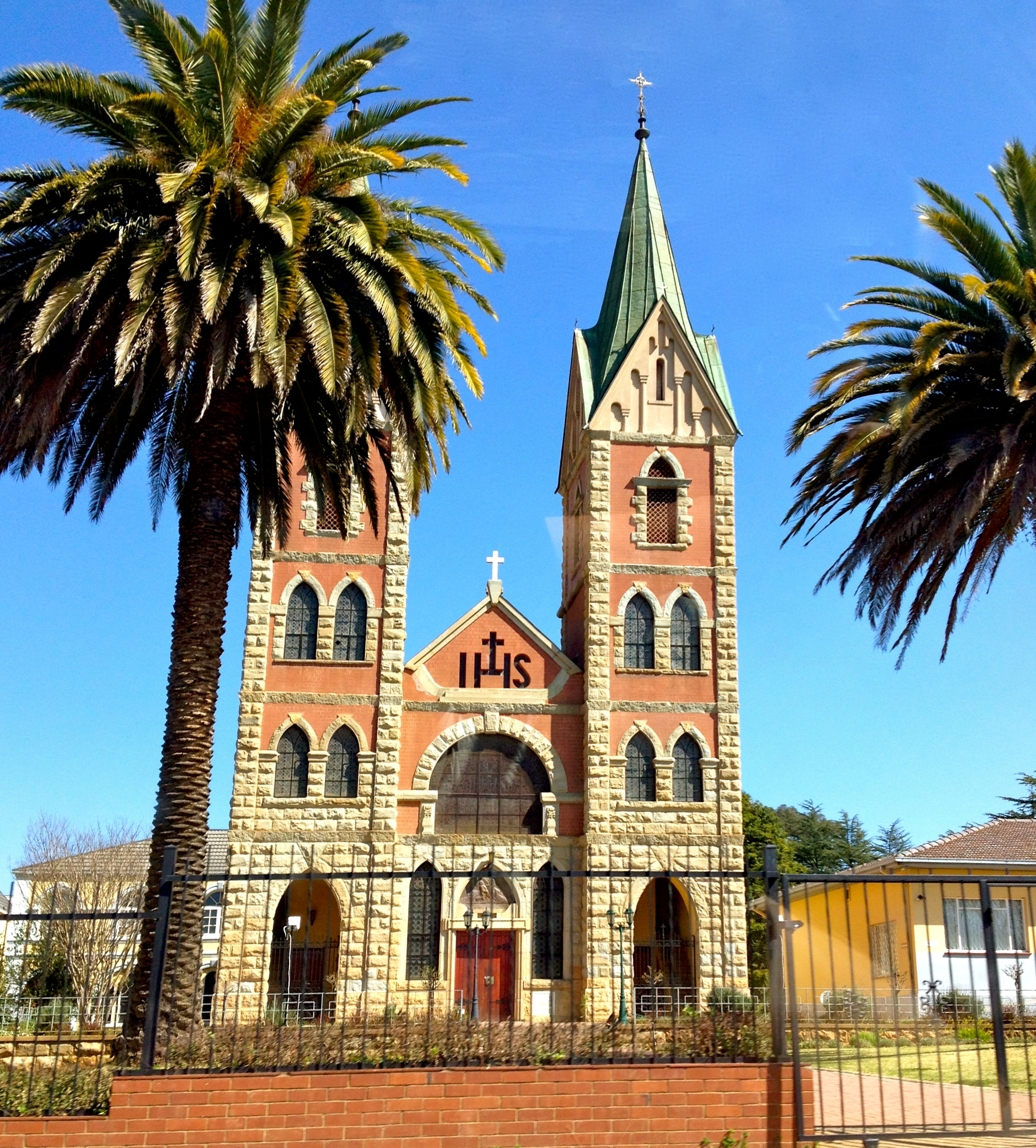
- St. Patrick’s Cathedral
- 30°32′45″S 29°25′18″E
- Location: Kokstad
- Country: South Africa
- Denomination: Roman Catholic

Clergy
- Bishop: Thulani Victor Mbuyisa

St. Patrick's Cathedral, also known simply as Kokstad Cathedral, is a parish of the Roman Catholic Church in Kokstad, KwaZulu-Natal, South Africa and the cathedral of the Diocese of Kokstad. The cathedral church is located at 107 Hope Street.

== History ==
Fr. John Nicholas Meyer of the Missionary Oblates of Mary Immaculate was assigned as the first parish priest in Kokstad in 1884. In September of that year, soldiers of the Cape Mounted Riflemen built a small chapel, which served as the first church. The Sisters of the Holy Cross Menzingen arrived four years later and staffed a parochial school, St. Patrick's School, for the next 107 years. A succession of OMI priests served Kokstad and the surrounding region for the next four decades. In September 1921, the Apostolic Vicariate of Marianhill was erected from the Apostolic Vicariate of Natal, and the Missionary Order of Mariannhill formed to take over missionary activities in the region.

The town had grown considerably by then, and it was decide to build a new church. The Holy Cross sisters led the fundraising effort, with gifts coming from the local community as well as from Europe. The cornerstone was laid on 27 February 1924 by Adalbero Fleischer, then Apostolic Vicar of Mariannhill, and construction completed later that year. In 1935, the Mariannhill Fathers were in turn succeeded by Franciscans, who staffed the church until 2000. In 1951, Pope Pius XII issued the bull Suprema Nobis erecting the Diocese of Kokstad (Dioecesis Kokstadensis), and St. Patrick's was named the seat of the bishop.

== See also ==
- List of cathedrals in South Africa#Roman Catholic
- Catholic Church in South Africa
