= Diocese of Dundee =

Latin Catholic diocese in South Africa

Coordinates: 33.5833°S 22.2000°E

Diocese of Dundee Dioecesis Dundeensis

Location
- Country: South Africa
- Metropolitan: Durban

Statistics
- Area: 50,000 km^{2} (19,000 sq mi)
- Population: Total; Catholics: (as of 2004); 1,711,715; 75,375 (4.4%)

Information
- Denomination: Catholic Church
- Sui iuris church: Latin Church
- Rite: Roman Rite

Current leadership
- Pope: Leo XIV
- Bishop: Graham Rose

The Diocese of Dundee (Latin: Dundeen(sis)) is a Latin Catholic diocese located in the city of Dundee in the ecclesiastical province of Durban in South Africa.

== History ==
- 23 June 1958: Established as Apostolic Prefecture of Volksrust from Diocese of Bremersdorp, Swaziland, Metropolitan Archdiocese of Durban and Diocese of Lydenburg
- 19 November 1982: Promoted as Diocese of Dundee

== Special churches ==
The Cathedral is the Cathedral of St. Francis of Assisi in Dundee.

== Leadership ==
- Prefect Apostolic of Volksrust (Roman rite)
  - Fr. Christopher Ulyatt, O.F.M. (1958 – 1969)
  - Fr. Marius Joseph Banks, O.F.M. (1969 – 1983)
- Bishops of Dundee (Roman rite)
  - Bishop Michael Vincent Paschal Rowland, O.F.M. (1983 – 2005)
  - Bishop Graham Rose (since 2008)

== See also ==
- Catholic Church in South Africa

== Sources ==
- GCatholic.org
- Catholic Hierarchy
