= Diocese of Pretoria =

Diocese of Pretoria may refer to:

- the Anglican Diocese of Pretoria
- the Roman Catholic Archdiocese of Pretoria
