= George Francis Daniel =

South African Roman Catholic archbishop (born 1933)

His Excellency George Francis Daniel
- Archbishop Emeritus of Pretoria
- Church: Catholic Church
- Archdiocese: Pretoria
- Appointed: 28 April 1975
- Term ended: 24 November 2008
- Predecessor: John Stephen Garner
- Successor: Paul Mandla Khumalo
- Other post: Military Ordinary for South Africa (1976–2008)

Orders
- Ordination: 19 December 1964
- Consecration: 3 August 1975 by John Colburn Garner

Personal details
- Born: 23 April 1933 (age 93) Pretoria, Union of South Africa

George Francis Daniel (born 23 April 1933) is a South African Roman Catholic prelate who served as Archbishop of Pretoria from 1975 to 2008. He also served as Military Ordinary for South Africa from 1976 until his retirement in 2008.

== Early life and priesthood ==
George Francis Daniel was born in Pretoria on 23 April 1933. He was ordained a priest for the Archdiocese of Pretoria on 19 December 1964.

== Episcopal ministry ==
On 28 April 1975, Pope Paul VI appointed Daniel Archbishop of Pretoria. He received episcopal consecration on 3 August 1975 at the Christian Brothers College in Mount Edmund from Archbishop John Stephen Garner with Archbishop Joseph Patrick Fitzgerald and Bishop Alfredo Poledrini serving as co-consecrators.

On 26 March 1976, Pope Paul VI additionally appointed him Military Ordinary for South Africa.

During his more than three decades as archbishop, Daniel participated in the work of the Southern African Catholic Bishops' Conference and oversaw the Archdiocese of Pretoria during the final years of apartheid and the democratic transition in South Africa.

On 24 November 2008, Pope Benedict XVI accepted Daniel's resignation as Archbishop of Pretoria and Military Ordinary for South Africa upon reaching the canonical retirement age. He was succeeded by Paul Mandla Khumalo.

== Later life ==
In 2025, Daniel marked the 50th anniversary of his episcopal ordination. The milestone was commemorated by the Southern African Catholic Bishops' Conference, and Pope Leo XIV conferred a papal honour in recognition of his service to the Church.
