= Jeremiah Madimetja Masela =

South African Catholic prelate (born 1958)

The Most Reverend Jeremiah Madimetja Masela
- Bishop of Polokwane, South Africa
- Church: Catholic Church
- Archdiocese: Roman Catholic Archdiocese of Pretoria
- See: Roman Catholic Diocese of Polokwane
- Appointed: 10 June 2013
- Installed: 7 September 2013
- Predecessor: Mogale Paul Nkhumishe

Orders
- Ordination: 15 December 1984
- Consecration: 7 September 2013 by Buti Joseph Tlhagale
- Rank: Bishop

Personal details
- Born: Jeremiah Madimetja Masela; 28 June 1958 (age 67) Doornspruit, Limpopo Province, Polokwane Diocese, South Africa

Styles of Jeremiah Madimetja Masela
- Reference style: Your Lordship; The Most Reverend
- Spoken style: His Lordship
- Religious style: Bishop

Jeremiah Madimetja Masela (born 28 June 1958) is a South African Catholic bishop who serves as Bishop of the Roman Catholic Diocese of Polokwane. He was appointed Bishop of Polokwane on 10 June 2013, by Pope Francis. He was consecrated bishop and installed at Polokwane on 7 September 2013.

== Background and education ==
He was born on 28 June 1958, at Doornspruit, near Polokwane, Limpopo Province, South Africa. He attended elementary school in his home area. He attended Pax College High School in Limpopo for his secondary schooling. He then joined St John Vianney Seminary in Pretoria. He holds a Master's degree in Spirituality from St Augustine College of South Africa in Johannesburg.

== Priest ==
He was ordained a priest on 15 December 1984. As priest of the diocese of Polokwane, he served in several roles inside and outside the diocese. He served as a priest of Polokwane diocese until 10 June 2013.

Among the tasks assigned to him as priest of Polokwane included as:

- Administrator of the Sacred Heart Cathedral from 2005 until 2008
- Vicar General of Polokwane Diocese from 1990 until 2004
- Spiritual director and lecturer at St John Vianney Seminary.
- While still a priest, The Holy Father appointed him Apostolic Administrator of Polokwane Diocese, working in that capacity from 9 December 2011 until 10 June 2013.

== As bishop ==
Father Jeremiah Madimetja Masela was appointed Bishop of the Roman Catholic Diocese of Polokwane on 10 June 2013. He received episcopal consecration at the Peter Mokaba Stadium in Polokwane, on 7 September 2013. The Principal Consecrator was Archbishop Buti Joseph Tlhagale, Archbishop of Johannesburg assisted by Archbishop William Matthew Slattery, Archbishop of Pretoria and Bishop João Noé Rodrigues, Bishop of Tzaneen.

While Bishop of Polokwane, he led the centenary celebrations of the establishment of his home parish of "Our Lady of Good Counsel Parish" in Doornspruit, Ga-Mashashane, outside Polokwane, on 17 September 2023. Founded by priests and nuns from Belgium, the Catholic mission includes "Motse Maria School" for girls, "St. Joseph's Hospital" and "Our Lady of Good Counsel Parish Church" which was erected in 1922.

== See also ==
- Catholic Church in South Africa

== Succession table ==
Catholic Church titles
Preceded by Mogale Paul Nkhumishe (17 February 2000 to 9 December 2011)	Bishop of Polokwane (Since 10 June 2013)	Succeeded by Incumbent
