= Diocese of Francistown =

Latin Catholic diocese in Botswana

Diocese of Francistown Dioecesis Francistaunensis

Location
- Country: Botswana
- Metropolitan: Pretoria
- Coordinates: 21°12′S 27°33′E

Statistics
- Area: 472,995 km^{2} (182,624 sq mi)
- Population: Total; Catholics: (as of 2017); 1.200,000; 17.000 (1,4%)

Information
- Denomination: Catholic Church
- Sui iuris church: Latin Church
- Rite: Roman Rite
- Cathedral: Cathedral of Our Lady of the Desert

Current leadership
- Pope: Leo XIV
- Bishop: Lawrence Ofentse Pheto (Bishop-Elect)

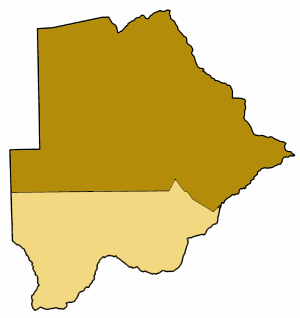
Francistown, Botswana

The Diocese of Francistown (Latin: Dioecesis Francistaunensis) is a Latin Catholic diocese located in the city of Francistown, Botswana, in the ecclesiastical province of Pretoria in South Africa.

== History ==
- 27 June 1998: Established as Apostolic Vicariate of Francistown from the Diocese of Gaborone.
- 2 October 2017: Elevated to Diocese, suffragan to the Archdiocese of Pretoria.

== Leadership ==
Vicar Apostolic of Francistown (Roman rite)

- Franklyn Atese Nubuasah, S.V.D.

Bishop of Gaborone, Botswana, S.V.D. (27 June 1998 – 2 October 2017)

Bishops of Francistown

- Franklyn Atese Nubuasah, S.V.D.

Bishop of Gaborone, Botswana, S.V.D. (2 October 2017 – 6 June 2019), appointed Bishop of Gaborone

- Anthony Pascal Rebello, S.V.D. (5 July 2021 – 4 May 2024)†
- Lawrence Ofentse Pheto (since 10 April 2026)
