= Tracula =

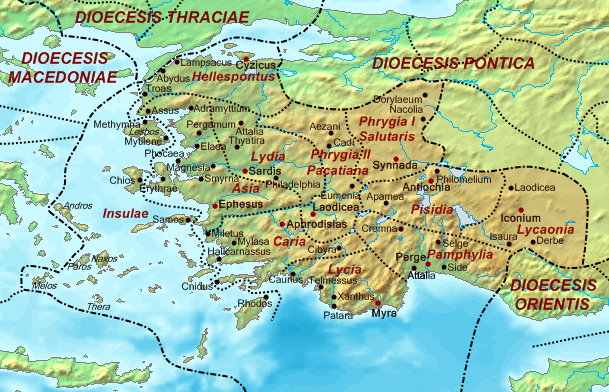
Asia minor 400AD

Tracula is a former Ancient city and bishopric in Asia Minor, which remains a Latin Catholic titular see.

Its modern site is Darkale, in Asian Turkey.

== History ==
Tracula, identifiable with Darkale in modern Turkey, is an ancient episcopal see of the Roman province of Lydia in the civil Diocese of Asia. It was part of the Patriarchate of Constantinople and was suffragan of the Archdiocese of Sardis.

Tracula was important enough in the Roman province of Lydia to become one of the numerous suffragans of its capital city's Metropolitan Archbishopric of Sardes, but was to fade.

The seat is not mentioned by Michel Le Quien in his work Oriens Christianus. The Bishop Leo is nevertheless recorded in the episcopal lists of the Second Council of Nicea of 787.

Today Tracula survives as a vacant titular bishopric and has been vacant since 25 December 1966.

== Titular see ==
The diocese was nominally restored in 1933 as a Latin Catholic titular bishopric.

It is vacant for decades, having had the following incumbents of the lowest (episcopal) rank :

- Titular Bishop John Colburn Garner (1948.04.09 – 1951.01.11), as Apostolic Vicar of Pretoria (South Africa) (1948.04.09 – 1951.01.11), promoted first Metropolitan Archbishop of Pretoria (1951.01.11 – 1975.04.28) and Military Vicar of South Africa (South Africa) (1951.05.17 – 1976.03.26)
- Titular Bishop John van Sambeek, White Fathers (M. Afr.) (1957.11.22 – 1966.12.25) as emeritate; previously Titular Bishop of Gergis (1936.11.19 – 1953.03.25) & Apostolic Vicar of Tanganyika (Tanzania) (1936.11.19 – 1946.05.10), Apostolic Vicar of Kigoma (Tanzania) (1946.05.10 – 1953.03.25), promoted first Bishop of Kigoma (1953.03.25 – 1957.11.22)
