= Diocese of Kimberley =

Diocese of Kimberley may refer to:

- the Catholic Diocese of Kimberley
- the Anglican Diocese of Kimberley and Kuruman
