= Edward Gabriel Risi =

South African Catholic bishop (1949–2025)

His Excellency Edward Gabriel Risi
- Bishop of Keimoes–Upington, South Africa (Deceased)
- Church: Catholic Church
- Archdiocese: Archdiocese of Bloemfontein
- Diocese: Diocese of Keimoes–Upington
- Appointed: 5 July 2000
- Installed: 14 October 2000
- Term ended: 4 December 2025
- Predecessor: John Baptist Minder

Orders
- Ordination: 12 July 1974 by Peter Fanyana John Butelezi
- Consecration: 14 October 2000 by Buti Joseph Tlhagale, Zithulele Patrick Mvemve and Anthony Chiminello

Personal details
- Born: 6 January 1949 Johannesburg, South Africa
- Died: 4 December 2025 (aged 76) Johannesburg, South Africa
- Motto: In cruce salus; Die Kruis: Bron van onse lewe (The Cross: Source of our life)

Styles of Edward Gabriel Risi
- Reference style: Right Reverend
- Religious style: Bishop

Edward Gabriel Risi O.M.I. (6 January 1949 – 4 December 2025) was a South African Roman Catholic prelate. He was bishop of the Diocese of Keimoes–Upington from 14 October 2000 until his death on 4 December 2025, at the age of 76. He was appointed bishop by Pope John Paul II. His episcopal consecration took place at Upington on 14 October 2000. He died in a hospital in Johannesburg. He was a professed member of the Catholic religious order of the Missionary Oblates of Mary Immaculate (O.M.I.).

== Background and education ==
He was born on 6 January 1949 in Johannesburg. He attended Holy Rosary Convent School, in Edenvale. He then attended Saint Benedict's College, in Bedfordview. He studied at the novitiate of the Oblates of Mary Immaculate, beginning in 1967. He studied at the Saint Joseph's Scholasticate, in Cedara, KwaZulu Natal. He holds a Bachelor of Arts degree awarded by the University of South Africa (UNISA) in 1973. He majored in Biblical Studies and History of Philosophy.

== Priesthood ==
He was ordained a priest for his Religious Order on 12 July 1974. He served as a priest until 5 July 2000. While a priest, he served in various roles and locations, including as:

- He spent five months in Lesotho in 1975.
- Assistant pastor of St. Margaret's, Diepkloof, Soweto from 1975 until 1978.
- Parish priest in Diepkloof from 1978 until 1984.
- Provincial Superior of the OMI Religious Order in the Transvaal Province from 1984 until 1990.
- Novice Master at the OMI Inter-provincial Novitiate in Johannesburg from 1990 until 2000.
- Parish priest of Saint Peter Claver Parish, in Primville (Pimville), Soweto from 1990 until 1993.

== Bishop ==
On 5 July 2000, Pope John Paul II appointed Reverend Father Monsignor Edward Gabriel Risi as Bishop of the Diocese of Keimoes-Upington. He was consecrated on 14 October 2000 at Upington by Buti Joseph Tlhagale, Archbishop of Bloemfontein assisted by Zithulele Patrick Mvemve, Bishop of Klerksdorp and Anthony Chiminello, Bishop of Keetmanshoop.

== Illness and death ==
On 2 December 2025, Bishop Risi was admitted to the Intensive Care Unit of Milpark Hospital in Johannesburg with a "serious heart condition". He died there from his illness on 4 December 2025.

== Legacy ==
Posthumously, he is reported to have been a "teacher" and "passionate liturgist". Among other roles, he served as "Chairperson of the Department for Christian Formation, Liturgy and Culture, and later as the Third Episcopal Member of the Department for Ecumenism" in the Southern African Catholic Bishops' Conference (SACBC).

== See also ==
- Catholic Church in South Africa

== Succession table ==
Catholic Church titles
Preceded by John Baptist Minder (12 October 1967 - 5 July 2000)	Bishop of Keimoes-Upington (5 July 2000 - 4 December 2025)	Succeeded by Vacant
