= Gabuza =

Gabuza is a surname. Notable people with the surname include:

- Abel Gabuza (1955–2021), South African Roman Catholic prelate
- Joel Gabuza, Zimbabwean politician
- Thamsanqa Gabuza (born 1987), South African footballer
