= Diocese of Klerksdorp =

Diocese of Klerksdorp may refer to:

- Diocese of Klerksdorp (Catholic)
- Diocese of Matlosane (Anglican), formerly the Diocese of Klerksdorp
