= Christ the King Cathedral (Gaborone) =

Roman Catholic church in Gaborone, Botswana

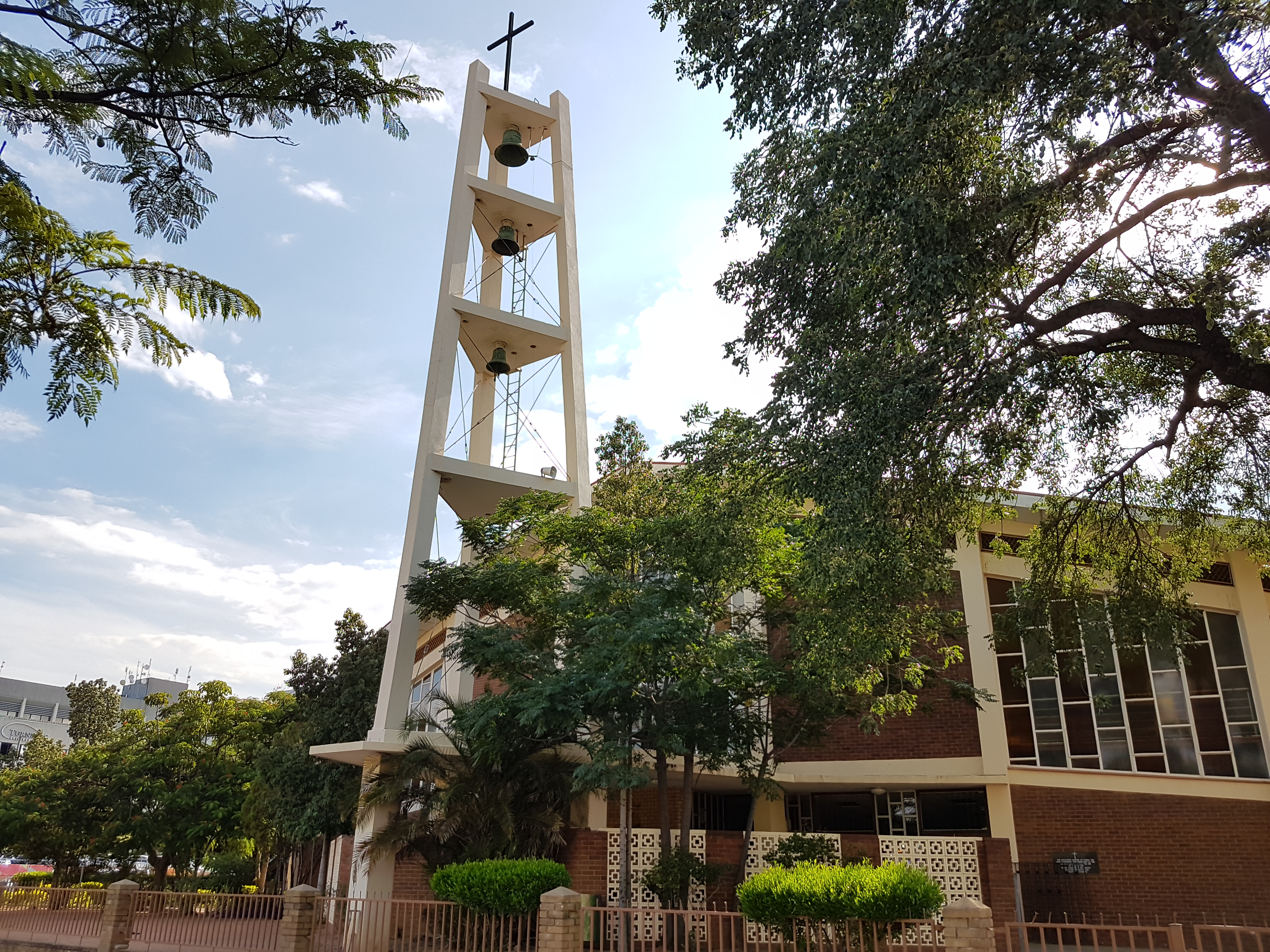
- Christ the King Cathedral in 2020

- Location within Botswana

Religion
- Affiliation: Roman Catholic
- Diocese: Diocese of Gaborone
- Province: Archdiocese of Pretoria
- Rite: Latin rite
- Ecclesiastical or organisational status: Cathedral
- Leadership: Franklyn Atese Nubuasah, SVD
- Year consecrated: 1968
- Status: active

Location
- Location: 161 Queens Road; Gaborone, Botswana
- Coordinates: 24.656944°S 25.918611°E

Website
- Diocese of Gaborone

Christ the King Cathedral is a Roman Catholic church in Gaborone, Botswana. It is the mother church of the Roman Catholic Diocese of Gaborone. Franklyn Atese Nubuasah became bishop in 2019.

Pope John Paul II visited on 13 September 1988.

== See also ==
- Roman Catholic Diocese of Gaborone
- Roman Catholicism in Botswana
