= Anthony Pascal Rebello =

Kenyan Catholic prelate (1950–2024)

Most Reverend Anthony Pascal Rebello, SVD
- Bishop of Francistown, Botswana (Deceased)
- Church: Catholic Church
- Metropolis: Archdiocese of Pretoria
- Diocese: Diocese of Francistown
- See: Francistown
- Appointed: 5 July 2021
- Installed: 4 September 2021
- Term ended: 4 May 2024
- Predecessor: Franklyn Atese Nubuasah, (SVD)
- Successor: Vacant

Orders
- Ordination: 10 May 1977
- Consecration: 4 September 2021 by Franklyn Atese Nubuasah, (Society of the Divine Word)
- Rank: Bishop

Personal details
- Born: Anthony Pascal Rebello; March 18, 1950 Nairobi, Colony and Protectorate of Kenya
- Died: 4 May 2024 (aged 74) Tati Siding, Botswana
- Denomination: Catholic
- Motto: Vocatur ad servitium praestandum

Styles of Anthony Pascal Rebello
- Reference style: His Excellency; The Most Reverend
- Spoken style: Your Excellency
- Religious style: Bishop

Anthony Pascal Rebello, Society of the Divine Word (18 March 1950 – 4 May 2024) was a Kenyan Catholic prelate of Goan ancestry who served as Bishop in Botswana, from 2021 until his death in 2024. He was appointed bishop of the Diocese of Francistown on 5 July 2021. He was installed in Francistown on 4 September 2021. He died in office on 4 May 2024 at the age of 74 years.

== Early life and education ==
He was born in Nairobi, the capital city of Kenya on 18 March 1950. He was of Goan ancestry, from Fatorda, Goa, India. He entered the Society of the Divine Word (SVD) in 1969. He took his perpetual vows as a member of the Society of the Divine Word in 1976. He was ordained a priest of that Society on 10 May 1977 in India.

== Priest ==
On 10 May 1977 was ordained a priest of the Society of the Divine Word (SVD) at a location in Goa, India. In 2003 he migrated to Botswana as a missionary of the SVD society. He served as parish priest of the Holy Cross Mogoditshane Parish in Gaborone Diocese in Botswana.

== Bishop ==
Pope Francis appointed him Bishop of Francistown in Botswana in the Ecclesiastical Province of Pretoria, South Africa on 5 July 2021.

He was consecrated and installed at the Our Lady of the Desert Cathedral, in Francistown, on 4 September 2021. The Principal Consecrator was Archbishop Franklyn Atese Nubuasah, Bishop of Gaborone assisted by Archbishop Dabula Anthony Mpako, Archbishop of Pretoria and Archbishop Peter Bryan Wells, Titular Archbishop of Marcianopolis.

== Death ==
Bishop Anthony Pascal Rebello died suddenly on the morning of Saturday, 4 May 2024, while on a prayer walk in Tati Siding, in the Diocese of Francistown. He was 74 years of age.

== Succession table ==
Catholic Church titles
Preceded by Franklyn Atese Nubuasah (27 June 1998 - 6 June 2019)	Bishop of Francistown (5 July 2021 - 4 May 2024)	Succeeded by Vacant
