= Graham Rose (bishop) =

Styles of Graham Rose
- Reference style: The Most Reverend
- Spoken style: Your Excellency
- Religious style: Bishop
- Posthumous style: not applicable

Thomas Graham Rose (born 23 December 1951) is a South African prelate of the Roman Catholic Church, who currently serves as Bishop of Dundee.

== Biography ==
Graham Rose was born in Evander, and studied under the Christian Brothers in Kimberley. He entered the University of Witwatersrand, from where he obtained a Bachelor of Commerce in business and Bachelor of Laws in civil law, and then studied philosophy and theology at the St. John Vianney, National Seminary in Pretoria.

Rose was ordained to the priesthood on 12 December 1980, and then served as pastor of Soweto until 1983. From 1984 to 1987, he furthered his studies at Maynooth College in Ireland, earning a degree in moral theology. Upon his return to South Africa, Rose served as pastor of East Rand and taught at St. John Vianney Seminary until 1990, whence he became pastor of Magaliesburg.

He was rector of St. John Vianney Seminary (1991-1997) and pastor of Rivonia (1999-2006) before returning to the pastorship of East Rand. In 2008, Rose was made pastor of Benoni and a professor at St. Augustine's Catholic College in Randburg. He was the diocesan vicar for vocations, a diocesan councilor, member of the Priestly Council of Johannesburg, and pastor of Actonville as well.

On 13 June 2008, Rose was appointed Bishop of Dundee by Pope Benedict XVI. As Bishop, he oversees 94,484 Catholics in 29 parishes; he is the first non-religious and first non-Franciscan to head the diocese. His episcopal consecration was scheduled for 30 August 2008.

Catholic Church titles
| Preceded by Michael Vincent Paschal Rowland, O.F.M. | Bishop of Dundee; 2008–present | Succeeded by incumbent |
