= Duncan Theodore Tsoke =

South African Catholic prelate (born 1964

The Most Reverend Duncan Theodore Tsoke
- Bishop of Kimberley, South Africa
- Church: Catholic Church
- Archdiocese: Roman Catholic Archdiocese of Bloemfontein
- See: Diocese of Kimberley
- Appointed: 3 March 2021
- Installed: 17 April 2021
- Predecessor: Abel Gabuza
- Successor: Incumbent
- Other post: Auxiliary Bishop of Johannesburg (6 February 2016 - 3 March 2021)

Orders
- Ordination: 2 December 1995
- Consecration: 30 April 2016 by Buti Joseph Tlhagale
- Rank: Bishop

Personal details
- Born: Duncan Theodore Tsoke; 15 April 1964 (age 62) Daveyton, Archdiocese of Johannesburg, Gauteng, South Africa

Styles of Duncan Theodore Tsoke
- Reference style: Your Lordship; The Most Reverend
- Spoken style: His Lordship
- Religious style: Bishop

Duncan Theodore Tsoke (born 15 April 1964) is a South African Catholic prelate who serves as the bishop of the Roman Catholic Diocese of Kimberley, in South Africa. He was appointed to that position on 3 March 2021 and was installed at Kimberley on 17 April 2021. Before that, from 6 February 2016 until 3 March 2021, he was auxiliary bishop of the Archdiocese of Johannesburg in South Africa. He was appointed bishop on 6 February 2016 by Pope Francis. He concurrently served as Titular Bishop of Horrea Coelia while auxiliary bishop. He was consecrated at Johannesburg on 30 April 2016 by Buti Joseph Tlhagale, Archbishop of Johannesburg. On 3 March 2021, The Holy Father transferred him to the Diocese of Kimberley and appointed him the local ordinary there.

== Background and education ==
He was born on 15 April 1964, in Daveyton, Archdiocese of Johannesburg, Gauteng, in South Africa. From 1988 until 1990, he studied philosophy at the Major Seminary of Hammanskraal in Pretoria. He then studied theology at the Saint John Marie Vianney National Major Seminary from 1991 until 1994. His Diploma in Management of Ecclesiastical Heritage was awarded in 2010 by an institution in Nairobi, Kenya.

== Priest ==
He was ordained a priest for the Archdiocese of Johannesburg on 2 December 1995. He served as a priest until 6 February 2016. While a priest, he served in various roles and locations, including:

- Parish Vicar of Saint Francis of Assisi in Yeoville, Johannesburg from 1996 until 1999.
- In-charge of the youth pastoral ministry from 1996 until 1999.
- Formator and professor of Spirituality at Saint Peter Seminary in Garsfontein, Pretoria from 1999 until 2000.
- Episcopal Vicar for Evangelization from 2000 until 2009.
- Assistant Vicar for the pastoral care of vocations from 2000 until 2009.
- Parish priest of Saint Albert Parish in Vosloorus, Johannesburg from 2000 until 2004.
- Parish priest of the Holy Family Parish in Ponong, Johannesburg from 2000 until 2004.
- Parish administrator of Saint Anthony Pucci Parish from 2006 until 2007.
- Vicar General of the Archdiocese of Johannesburg from 2009 until 2016.
- Pastor of the Holy Family in Turffontein from 2009 until 2016.

== Bishop ==
On 6 February 2016, Pope Francis appointed Reverend Father Duncan Theodore Tsoke, previously a member of the clergy of Johannesburg Archdiocese as Auxiliary Bishop of the Archdiocese of Johannesburg, South Africa. He was simultaneously assigned the titular see of Horrea Coelia. He was consecrated on 30 April 2016 by the hands of Buti Joseph Tlhagale, Archbishop of Johannesburg assisted by Vincent Mduduzi Zungu, Bishop of Port Elizabeth and Valentine Tsamma Seane, Bishop of Gaborone.

The Holy Father transferred Bishop Duncan Theodore Tsoke, previously auxiliary bishop of Johannesburg to the Roman Catholic Diocese of Kimberley on 3 March 2021 and appointed him local ordinary there. He was installed at Kimberly on 17 April 2021.

== See also ==
- Catholic Church in South Africa

== Succession table ==
Catholic Church titles
Preceded by Abel Gabuza (23 December 2010 - 9 December 2018)	Bishop of Kimberley (since 3 March 2021)	Succeeded by Incumbent
Preceded by	Auxiliary Bishop of Johannesburg (6 February 2016 - 3 March 2021)	Succeeded by
