= Kevin Dowling (bishop) =

His Excellency, The Most Reverend Kevin Patrick Dowling C.SS.R.
- Bishop Emeritus of Rustenburg
- Church: Roman Catholic Church
- Diocese: Rustenburg
- See: Pretoria
- Appointed: 2 December 1990
- Installed: 27 January 1991
- Term ended: 25 November 2020
- Predecessor: Henry Lancelot Paxton Hallett C.SS.R.
- Successor: Robert Mogapi Mphiwe
- Previous posts: Vice Provincial of the Congregation of the Most Holy Redeemer in South Africa (1976-1986); Consultor General of the Congregation of the Most Holy Redeemer (1986-1991)

Orders
- Ordination: 9 July 1967 by Denis Eugene Hurley
- Consecration: 27 January 1991 by Denis Eugene Hurley

Personal details
- Born: 14 February 1944 (age 82) Pretoria, Transvaal (now Gauteng), South Africa
- Residence: Tapologo, North West
- Motto: Your servant for Jesus

Kevin Patrick Dowling, C.SS.R., (born 14 February 1944) is a South African prelate of the Roman Catholic Church. A Redemptorist, he was the second Bishop of Rustenburg from 1991 to 2020.

== Biography ==
Born in Pretoria, Dowling was ordained a priest of the Congregation of the Most Holy Redeemer, more commonly known as the Redemptorists, on 9 July 1967.

He was appointed Bishop of Rustenburg on 2 December 1990. He received his episcopal consecration on 27 January 1991 from Archbishop Denis Hurley.

He advocated the use of condoms to prevent HIV transmission. Catholic teaching opposed the promotion of condom use. The papal nuncio to South Africa told Dowling that he had strayed from Catholic teaching. The Southern African Bishops Conference also described condoms as "an immoral and misguided weapon" in the fight against HIV, arguing that condom use could even encourage the spread of HIV by promoting extramarital sex. For his stance on this matter, the Utne Reader, a United States magazine that provides "alternative coverage of politics, culture, and new ideas", named Dowling one of its "50 Visionaries Who Are Changing the World".

Dowling also criticized the application of the Southern African Catholic Bishops Conference for approval of the revision of the English translation of the Mass liturgy as premature. He objected to the revision itself, which had received the Holy See's confirmation after being agreed on by English-speaking Episcopal Conferences: "I am concerned that this latest decision from the Vatican may be interpreted as another example of what is perceived to be a systematic and well-managed dismantling of the vision, theology and ecclesiology of Vatican II." He wrote:

Our objective as Church should surely be that instead of making everyone conform to a dead-language text we need to allow diversity in cultural and linguistic expressions of faith communities around the world. It seems to me that we need to take much more seriously our collegial role and mission as bishops in accordance with the vision and theology of Vatican II, and after discernment and consultation with all the People of God stand up for what we believe to be in the best interests of our people.

Pope Francis accepted his resignation on 25 November 2020.

Preceded by Henry Lancelot Paxton Hallett	Bishop of Rustenburg; 27 January 1991 – 25 November 2020	Succeeded by Robert Mogapi Mphiwe
Preceded by Laurent Monsengwo Pasinya	International President of Pax Christi; 2010—present	Succeeded by Incumbent
