= Valentine Tsamma Seane =

- Bishop Emeritus of Gaborone
- Church: Christ the King Cathedral
- Archdiocese: Archdiocese of Pretoria
- Diocese: Diocese of Gaborone
- Appointed: 5 February 2009
- Installed: 25 April 2009
- Term ended: 9 August 2017
- Predecessor: Boniface Tshosa Setlalekgosi

Orders
- Ordination: 19 March 1994
- Consecration: 25 April 2009 by Archbishop James Patrick Green

Personal details
- Born: 2 November 1966 (age 58) Lobatse, Botswana
- Motto: Deus caritas est (God is love)

Valentine Tsamma Seane (born 2 November 1966) is the former bishop of the Roman Catholic Diocese of Gaborone at the Christ the King Cathedral in Gaborone, Botswana. He is the second Motswana to be a bishop in Botswana.

== Biography ==
Valentine Tsamma Seane was born in Lobatse, Botswana and was ordained a priest on 19 March 1994. Seane was appointed bishop of the Diocese of Gaborone on 5 February 2009 and ordained 25 April 2009.

On 9 August 2017, Pope Francis ordered his dismissal from office.

== Controversy ==
Seane has been involved in controversy surrounding his consecration. Supporters of Father Johannes Kgaodi, a priest at the Corpus Catholic Church in Broadhurst, have stated that Kgaodi is the rightful successor to the title of bishop. The faction cites Seane's insistence of renting a 2 million pula (US$312,000 as of April 2011) house using the church's money instead of using the one provided by the church as a questionable and corrupt act as bishop.

== See also ==
- Diocese of Gaborone

Catholic Church titles
Preceded by Boniface Tshosa Setlalekgosi	Bishop of the Diocese of Gaborone; 25 April 2009 – present	Succeeded by incumbent
