= John Boekenfoehr =

John Boekenfoehr O.M.I.
- Bishop of Kimberley
- Church: Catholic Church
- Diocese: Diocese of Kimberley
- In office: March 24, 1953 – July 1, 1974
- Predecessor: Herman Joseph Meysing
- Successor: Erwin Hecht

Orders
- Ordination: July 11, 1927 by Henri-Jean-Marie Prud’homme
- Consecration: May 3, 1953 by Pietro Fumasoni Biondi

Personal details
- Born: January 28, 1903 West Point, Nebraska, United States
- Died: August 9, 1982 (aged 79) Cornwall, Ontario, Canada

John Boekenfoehr (January 28, 1903, in West Point – August 9, 1982, in Cornwall) was an American clergyman and bishop for the Roman Catholic Diocese of Kimberley. He became ordained in 1927. He was appointed bishop in 1953. He died in 1982.
