= Fulgence Werner Le Roy =

Fulgence Werner Le Roy OSB
- Bishop of Pietersburg
- Church: Catholic Church
- Diocese: Diocese of Pietersburg
- In office: 10 July 1975 – 7 February 2000
- Predecessor: Francis Clement Van Hoeck
- Successor: Mogale Paul Nkhumishe
- Previous post: Titular Bishop of Ausafa (1975-1988)

Orders
- Ordination: 20 July 1952
- Consecration: 14 September 1975 by George Francis Daniel

Personal details
- Born: 23 August 1924 Beervelde, Lochristi, East Flanders, Belgium
- Died: 14 October 2017 (aged 93) Affligem Abbey, Affligem, Flemish Brabant, Belgium

Fulgence Werner Le Roy (23 August 1924 – 14 October 2017) was a Catholic bishop.

Le Roy was ordained to the priesthood in 1952. He served as bishop of the Diocese of Pietersburg (renamed to Polokwane in 2009), South Africa, from 1988 to 2000. He died on 14 October 2017 at the age of 93.

== See also ==
- Catholic Church in South Africa
