= Giuseppe Sandri =

Italian-South African Roman Catholic bishop (1946–2019)

Giuseppe Sandri MCCI
- Bishop of Witbank
- Church: Catholic Church
- Diocese: Diocese of Witbank
- In office: 6 November 2009 – 30 May 2019
- Predecessor: Paul Mandla Khumalo
- Successor: Xolelo Thaddaeus Kumalo

Orders
- Ordination: 27 May 1972
- Consecration: 31 January 2010 by Buti Joseph Tlhagale

Personal details
- Born: 26 August 1946 Faedo, Trentino, Italy
- Died: 30 May 2019 (aged 72)

Giuseppe Sandri (26 August 1946 – 30 May 2019) was an Italian-South African Roman Catholic bishop.

Sandri was born in Italy and was ordained to the priesthood. He served as bishop of the Roman Catholic Diocese of Witbank, South Africa from 2009 until his death in 2019.
