= Cyril Axelrod =

South African Roman Catholic priest

The Reverend Father Cyril Axelrod OBE CSsR
- Church: Roman Catholic Church

Orders
- Ordination: November 1970

Personal details
- Born: Sheftil Binyamin ben Avram Abba; 24 February 1942 (age 84) Johannesburg, South Africa
- Education: Gallaudet College; Catholic University of America; St John Vianney Seminary, Pretoria

Father Cyril Bernhard Axelrod, OBE, CSsR (born 24 February 1942) is a deafblind Catholic priest of the Redemptorist Order, known for his work with deaf and deafblind people. He has ministered to the deaf and deafblind around the world, including in South Africa, China and the United Kingdom. In 2014 he became the first deafblind person to become an Officer of the Order of the British Empire.

== Biography ==
Cyril Axelrod was born as Sheftil Binyamin ben Avram Abba on 24 February 1942 in Johannesburg, South Africa. He was born profoundly deaf to hearing parents who were Orthodox Jewish. His grandfather was a rabbi, and his parents spoke Yiddish, with little knowledge of English.

He attended St. Vincent's School for the Deaf in Johannesburg.

As a young man he planned to become a rabbi, but after a difficult spiritual journey, converted to Catholicism in 1965. From 1962 to 1965 he studied accounting and became a certified bookkeeper. He decided to become a priest when he noticed fellow deaf people at Mass who could not understand what the priest was saying. From 1965 to 1966 he traveled to the U.S., studying philosophy at Gallaudet College and Catholic University of America. Axelrod trained for the priesthood at St. John Vianney Seminary in Pretoria, South Africa, and was ordained in Johannesburg in November 1970. At the time, he was the second born-deaf person to be initiated.

His new parish would consist of the deaf people throughout South Africa, using eight indigenous sign languages. He entered the Redemptorist order in 1975. Axelrod was dismayed to find black deaf children in South Africa, some as old as 15, who were unable to read, write or sign as a result of discriminatory education policies. Axelrod also encouraged the adoption of one universal sign language in South Africa to promote opportunities for black deaf South Africans. Defying apartheid, he established multiple multiracial institutions, including a school for deaf children in Soweto, a hostel for deaf homeless people in Pretoria, and an employment center in Cape Town.

He worked to have schools, community centers, and homes built for deaf people around the world. In 1988 he traveled to Hong Kong and Macau, spending twelve years in Macau and setting up multiple services for deaf people there, including a center for deaf children and the Macau Deaf Association. He would travel on missions in the U.S., Malta, and Australia, among other locations.

Axelrod was diagnosed with Usher syndrome in 1979, which would mean he would gradually lose his sight. He was completely blind by 2001, using finger signing to communicate. He moved to London in 2000, where he studied braille and worked with the organization Deafblind UK as their Pastoral Support Development Coordinator. He also qualified as a massage therapist. In 2013 he made the news in South Africa when Comair staff would not let him board a flight alone because of his deafblindness, even though Axelrod had traveled independently for many decades; Comair later offered to provide a guide to travel with Axelrod for free.

Axelrod published an autobiography in 2005, And the Journey Begins, which describes his difficult childhood, his spiritual journey, and his pastoral ministry. A book of his paintings was published in 2020, titled Light in silent darkness.

In 2025 he began to return to his Jewish roots, donning tefillin at Chabad of Hong Kong, remeniscing about his Jewish childhood in writing with a braile keyboard, and requesting that a Mezuzah be put on his door. He was pictured wearing tefilin and holding a replica Torah scroll.

== Honors ==
Gallaudet College awarded Axelrod the Edward Minor Gallaudet Award in 1982 for his work in promoting "the well-being of deaf people of the world." Axelrod received an honorary doctorate from Gallaudet University in 2001.

In 2014, he was appointed an Officer of the Order of the British Empire (OBE) "for services to the development of deaf blind services in Hong Kong". Axelrod was the first deafblind person to have received that honor.
