= Diocese of Gaborone =

Latin Catholic diocese in Botswana

Coordinates: 24°39′27″S 25°55′07″E

Diocese of Gaborone Dioecesis Gaboronensis

Location
- Country: Botswana
- Ecclesiastical province: Pretoria

Statistics
- Area: 178,301 km^{2} (68,842 sq mi)
- Population: Total; Catholics: (as of 2006); 1,003,645; 63,926 (6.4%)
- Parishes: 22

Information
- Denomination: Catholic Church
- Sui iuris church: Latin Church
- Rite: Roman Rite
- Established: 24 April 1959
- Cathedral: Christ the King Cathedral
- Patron saint: Our Lady of Sorrows
- Secular priests: 36

Current leadership
- Pope: Leo XIV
- Bishop: Franklyn Atese Nubuasah, SVD
- Metropolitan Archbishop: Dabula Mpako

The Diocese of Gaborone (Latin: Dioecesis Gaboronensis) is a Latin Catholic diocese located in the city of Gaborone, Botswana, in the ecclesiastical province of Pretoria in South Africa. The motto of the diocese is Deus Caritas Est, which means "God is love."

== History ==
- 24 April 1959: Established as the Apostolic Prefecture of Bechuanaland from the Diocese of Bulawayo in Zimbabwe, the Diocese of Kimberley in South Africa and the Apostolic Vicariate of Windhoek in Namibia
- 5 August 1966: Promoted as Diocese of Gaberones
- 7 April 1970: Renamed as Diocese of Gaborone

== Special churches ==
- The cathedral is Christ the King Cathedral in Gaborone.

== Leadership ==
Prefect Apostolic of Bechuanaland

- Urban Charles Joseph Murphy, C.P. (24 April 1959 – 5 August 1966)

Bishops of Gaborone

- Urban Charles Joseph Murphy, C.P. (5 August 1966 – 28 February 1981)
- Boniface Tshosa Setlalekgosi (30 November 1981 – 5 February 2009)
- Valentine Tsamma Seane (5 February 2009 – 9 August 2017)
- Franklyn Atese Nubuasah, S.V.D. (6 June 2019 – present)
  - Given the personal title of archbishop on 5 July 2021

== See also ==
- Catholic Church in Botswana
