= Diocese of Tzaneen =

Roman Catholic diocese in South Africa

Coordinates: 23.8333°S 30.1667°E

Diocese of Tzaneen Dioecesis Tzaneensis

Location
- Country: South Africa
- Metropolitan: Pretoria

Statistics
- Area: 49,472 km^{2} (19,101 sq mi)
- Population: Total; Catholics: (as of 2004); 2,500,000; 49,543 (2.3%)

Information
- Rite: Latin Rite

Current leadership
- Pope: Leo XIV
- Bishop: Joao Noe Rodrigues

The Roman Catholic Diocese of Tzaneen (Latin: Tzaneen(sis)) is a diocese located in the city of Tzaneen in the ecclesiastical province of Pretoria in South Africa.

== History ==
On 7 November 1906, assisted by the Collins brothers, Fr Victor OSB bought from a certain Olaf Svendson the farm Noodshulp in the Zoutpans District, Ward Woodbush, in the region of Magoebaskloof,Limpopo Province.The Benedictines retained ownership of the property, benefitting from the eucalyptus plantation. They eventually built their monastery and St Benedict’s church which was blessed on 12 August 1926. This was their base from which they did their missionary outreach by establishing new outstations in Modjadjiskloof, Tzaneen, Dwars River, St Scholastica, Louis Trichardt and Musina.

- 27 December 1962: Established as Apostolic Prefecture of Louis Trichardt from the Territorial Prelature of Pietersburg
- 16 November 1972: Promoted as Diocese of Louis Trichardt – Tzaneen
- 18 July 1987: Renamed as Diocese of Tzaneen

== Special churches ==
- The cathedral is Cathedral of the Most Holy Trinity (1954)

Patron saints of the diocese are:

Our Lady of the Sacred Heart and St. Joseph

Blessed Benedict Daswa, first Catholic martyr recognized by Catholic Church in Southern Africa was beatified on 13 September 2015 in parish of Sibasa/Thohoyandou, the Diocese of Tzaneen.

== Leadership ==
- Prefect Apostolic of Louis Trichardt (Roman rite)
  - Fr. John Thomas Durkin, M.S.C. (1963.02.15 – 1972.11.16 see below)
- Bishops of Diocese of Tzaneen (Roman rite)
  - Bishop John Thomas Durkin, M.S.C. (see above 1972.11.16 – 1984.06.22)
  - Bishop Hugh Patrick Slattery, M.S.C. (1984.06.22-2010.01.28)
  - Bishop Joao Noe Rodrigues (since 2010.01.28 appointed, 2010.04.18 consecrated)

== See also ==
- Roman Catholicism in South Africa
