= Benedictine Abbey of Pietersburg =

Benedictine monastery in Pietersburg, South Africa

Polokwane Abbey, Subiaco Mission
Monastery information
- Other name: St Benedict's Abbey
- Order: Subiaco Cassinese Congregation, Order of Saint Benedict
- Established: 1937
- Dedication: Benedict of Nursia
- Diocese: Roman Catholic Diocese of Polokwane

People
- Founders: Monks of Congregatio Sublacensis Cassinensis, Extra Provincial, under Abbot President
- Prior: Very Rev. Ghislain Maluvu, OSB

Site
- Location: Pietersburg (Polokwane), Limpopo, South Africa

St Benedict's Abbey, Pietersburg (Polokwane), Limpopo, South Africa, is a Benedictine monastery of the Subiaco Cassinese Congregation. It began in 1911 as a mission territory; the community established a monastery in 1937. As an Abbey Nullius, the monastery governed what is now the Roman Catholic Diocese of Polokwane until 1989. As of 2022, the community numbers about 12 in various stages of formation monks. The community was given the Very Rev. Dominic Mohapi, OSB, as Prior Administrator on August 18, 2022. On October 1, 2023, the Very Rev. Ghislain Maluvu, OSB, was appointed as Prior Administrator.

== History ==
In 1906, Benedictine monks of the Subiaco Congregation, Flemish Province, arrived in the Northern Transvaal. Inspired by the contribution of the first generations of Benedictines in the conversion of Western Europe, they hoped to take over the area as a mission territory and establish a monastery. Thus, the Prefecture Apostolic of Northern Transvaal was created, with Fr. Ildefonso Lanslots, O.S.B., as its first head.

Shortly after their arrival, the monks purchased the farm of Noodshulp, intending to convert it into a monastery. However, the outbreak of World War I delayed such an endeavor. Indeed, the monastery was not founded until 1937. Two years later, the Benedictines' mission territory, previously a Prefecture Apostolic, was raised to the status of an Abbey Nullius. On November 14, 1939, Fr Frederick Osterrath became the territory's first Abbot-Bishop.

Monastic observance at Noodshulp was interrupted by World War II, to be resumed in 1947. In 1952, Abbot-Bishop Osterrath resigned. His successor, Abbot-Bishop Francis Clement van Hoeck, O.S.B., was compelled to transfer the monastery from Noodshulp to the city of Pieterburg (Polokwane) itself, which was the see of the Abbey Nullius. However, this venture was not successful, in large part because of apartheid laws. Thus, when Abbot-Bishop Fulgence Le Roy, O.S.B., succeeded van Hoeck in 1975, the monastery was relocated to a mission station known as Subiaco, situated at the foot of a mountain range 40 km from Pietersburg.

In 1989, the Abbey Nullius of Pietersburg was promoted to the Diocese of Pieterburg. Abbot-Bishop Le Roy became head of the diocese, and was succeeded as abbot by Fr Willibrord Van Rompaey. The rule of the monastery passed to Fr Rik de Wit when Abbot Van Rompaey resigned in 1998.

In 2006, the Monastery of Christ in the Desert (Abiquiu, New Mexico, USA) was asked by the Abbot President of the Subiaco Cassinese Congregation to assist in the needs of the monastery. Accordingly, Fr. Joseph Gabriel Cusimano and several monks from Christ in the Desert assisted in the ongoing formation of the monastic community. In November, 2010, Fr. Jeffrey Steele, was appointed Prior Administrator and the community continued under his leadership until 2017. Fr. Ghislain Maluvu became the local superior in 2017 and then Prior Administrator. In May of 2020, Abbot John Paul Mwaniki was appointed as Apostolic Commissary for Saint Benedict's Abbey, Subiaco, Polokwane. He resigned in November of 2021. Brother Francis Wanjiku served as the local superior since that time until 2022. Very Rev. Father Dominic Mohapi was installed as Prior Administrator on August 18. 2022. He was succeeded on October 1, 2023, by the Very Rev. Ghislain Maluvu, OSB, as Prior Administrator. The community is an international community with members from five African nations, including South Africa, and from the Netherlands and the United States.

== Apostolic work ==
Despite the comparatively small size of the monastic community, the monks of Subiaco are quite involved in the life of the local church and the people. The community serves one parish with nine outstations, owns three schools (St. Bede's High School), and works with the local population in projects to improve their lives.

== Personnel ==
In 2024, St. Benedict's Abbey, Polokwane, included nineteen monks (priests and brothers) in the community, nine of whom were in solemn monastic profession and five in temporary vows. The monastery is a member community of the Subiaco Cassinese Congregation of the Order of St. Benedict.

== See also ==
- Order of Saint Benedict
- Subiaco Cassinese Congregation
- Roman Catholicism in South Africa
