= Diocese of Klerksdorp (Catholic) =

Latin Catholic diocese in South Africa

Coordinates: 33.5833°S 22.2000°E

Diocese of Klerksdorp Dioecesis Klerkpolitana

Location
- Country: South Africa
- Metropolitan: Johannesburg

Statistics
- Area: 34,800 km^{2} (13,400 sq mi)
- Population: Total; Catholics: (as of 2004); 1,500,000; 103,466 (6.9%)

Information
- Denomination: Catholic Church
- Sui iuris church: Latin Church
- Rite: Roman Rite
- Cathedral: Cathedral of Christ the Redeemer

Current leadership
- Pope: Leo XIV
- Bishop: Victor Hlolo Phalana
- Bishops emeritus: Daniel Verstraete O.M.I.

The Diocese of Klerksdorp (Latin: Dioecesis Klerkpolitana) is a Latin Catholic diocese located in the city of Klerksdorp in the ecclesiastical province of Johannesburg in South Africa.

The second bishop of Klerksdorp was His Lordship, the Right Reverend Bishop Zithulele Patrick Mvemve, former auxiliary bishop of Johannesburg (while serving there, he was the Titular Bishop of Luperciana). On Friday, April 26, 2013, Pope Francis accepted Bishop Mvemve's resignation as Bishop, under Canon 401.2 of the Latin Rite 1983 Code of Canon Law. Pope Francis then appointed Johannesburg's archbishop, Buti Joseph Tlhagale, O.M.I., as Apostolic Administrator until the third bishop was named.

== History ==
- October 14, 1965: Established as Apostolic Prefecture of Western Transvaal from the Diocese of Johannesburg
- February 27, 1978: Promoted as Diocese of Klerksdorp

== Leadership ==
- Prefect Apostolic of Western Transvaal (Roman rite)
  - Fr. Daniel Alphonse Omer Verstraete, O.M.I. (1965.11.09 – 1978.02.27 see below)
- Bishops of Klerksdorp (Roman rite)
  - Bishop Daniel Alphonse Omer Verstraete, O.M.I. (see above 1978.02.27 – 1994.03.26)
  - Bishop Zithulele Patrick Mvemve (1994.03.26 - 2013.04.26)
  - Bishop Victor Hlolo Phalana (2015.01.25 - present day)

== See also ==
- Klerksdorp Diocese Official Website
- Catholic Church in South Africa
