= Pevensey, KwaZulu-Natal =

Pevensey
- Location within KwaZulu-Natal Location within South Africa
- Coordinates: 29.783°S 29.5°E
- Country: South Africa
- Province: KwaZulu-Natal
- District: Harry Gwala
- Municipality: Dr Nkosazana Dlamini-Zuma

Area
  - Total: 1.96 km^{2} (0.76 sq mi)

Population (2011)
  - Total: 554
  - Density: 283/km^{2} (732/sq mi)

Racial makeup (2011)
  - Black African: 99.5%
  - Coloured: 0.4%
  - White: 0.2%

First languages (2011)
  - Zulu: 95.7%
  - S. Ndebele: 1.3%
  - English: 1.1%
  - Sign language: 1.1%
  - Other: 0.9%
- Time zone: UTC+2 (SAST)

Pevensey is a town in Dr Nkosazana Dlamini-Zuma Local Municipality in the KwaZulu-Natal province of South Africa. Pevensey was an early location for St. Peter's Catholic Seminary, which trained indigenous African priests.
