= Erwin Hecht =

Erwin Hecht O.M.I.
- Bishop of Kimberley
- Church: Catholic Church
- Diocese: Diocese of Kimberley
- In office: 1 July 1974 – 15 December 2009
- Predecessor: John Boekenfoehr
- Successor: Abel Gabuza
- Previous posts: Titular Bishop of Obba (1972-1974); Auxiliary Bishop of Kimberley (1972-1974)

Orders
- Ordination: 26 July 1959
- Consecration: 11 May 1972 by Joseph Patrick Fitzgerald

Personal details
- Born: 13 October 1933 Burgrieden, Free People's State of Württemberg, German Reich
- Died: 19 November 2016 (aged 83) Hünfeld, Hesse, Germany

Erwin Hecht, O.M.I. (13 October 1933 – 19 November 2016) was a Roman Catholic bishop.

Ordained to the priesthood in 1959, Hecht served as auxiliary bishop of the Roman Catholic Diocese of Kimberley, South Africa, from 1972 to 1974. He then served as bishop of the diocese from 1974 to 2009.
