= Diocese of Rustenburg =

Roman Catholic diocese in South Africa

Coordinates: 33.5833°S 22.2000°E

Diocese of Rustenburg Dioecesis Rustenburgensis

Location
- Country: South Africa
- Metropolitan: Pretoria

Statistics
- Area: 32,120 km^{2} (12,400 sq mi)
- Population: Total; Catholics: (as of 2004); 32,120; 32,120 (4.4%)

Information
- Rite: Latin Rite

Current leadership
- Pope: Leo XIV
- Bishop: Robert Mogapi Mphiwe

The Roman Catholic Diocese of Rustenburg (Latin: Rustenburgen(sis)) is a diocese located in the city of Rustenburg in the ecclesiastical province of Pretoria in South Africa.

== History ==
- June 28, 1971: Established as Apostolic Prefecture of Rustenburg from the Metropolitan Archdiocese of Pretoria
- November 18, 1987: Promoted as Diocese of Rustenburg

== Leadership ==
- Prefect Apostolic of Rustenburg (Roman rite)
  - Fr. Henry Lancelot Paxton Hallett, C.SS.R. (1971.09.29 – 1987.11.18 see below)
- Bishops of Rustenburg (Roman rite)
  - Bishop Henry Lancelot Paxton Hallett, C.SS.R. (see above 1987.11.18 – 1990.01.30)
  - Bishop Kevin Dowling, C.SS.R. (1990.12.02 - 2020.11.25)
  - Bishop Robert Mogapi Mphiwe (since 2020.11.25)

== See also ==
- Roman Catholicism in South Africa

== Sources ==
- GCatholic.org
- Catholic Hierarchy
