= Daniel Verstraete =

Daniel Verstraete, O.M.I.
- Bishop-emeritus of the Diocese of Klerksdorp
- Church: Roman Catholic Church
- See: Roman Catholic Diocese of Klerksdorp
- Appointed: 6 November 1965 (as Apostolic Prefect); 27 February 1978 (as Diocesan Bishop)
- In office: 1965 – 1994
- Predecessor: new creation
- Successor: Zithulele Patrick Mvemve

Orders
- Ordination: 19 February 1950
- Consecration: 14 May 1978 by Peter Fanyana John Butelezi

Personal details
- Born: Daniel Alphonse Omer Verstraete; 31 July 1924 (age 101) Oostrozebeke, Belgium

Daniel Alphonse Omer Verstraete, O.M.I. (born 31 July 1924) is a Belgian-born South African Roman Catholic prelate who served as the first Diocesan Bishop of the new promoted Roman Catholic Diocese of Klerksdorp from 27 February 1978 until his resignation on 26 March 1994. Previously he was a Prefect Apostolic of the Prefecture Apostolic of Western Transvaal from 9 November 1965 until 27 February 1978 and a participant of the Second Vatican Council.

== Biography ==
Verstraete was born in the Flemish Region of Belgium and as a young person joined a missionary congregation of the Missionary Oblates of Mary Immaculate, where he made a solemn profession and was ordained a priest on 19 February 1950, after completed his philosophical and theological education at the seminary studies in the scholasticate in Velaines.

Verstraete worked as a missionary in South Africa and was appointed the first Prefect Apostolic of the new created Prefecture Apostolic of Western Transvaal on 9 November 1965. In this time he participated in the Fourth session of the Second Vatican Council as a Council Father in 1965.

On 27 February 1978 the Prefecture Apostolic was elevated in the rank of a Diocese and Mons. Verstraete was appointed as the first bishop of the Roman Catholic Diocese of Klerksdorp. He was consecrated to the Episcopate on 14 May 1978, in Klerksdorp. The principal consecrator was Archbishop Peter Fanyana John Butelezi, OMI with other prelates of the Roman Catholic Church.

In this office Verstraete served until his resignation on 26 March 1994.

Catholic Church titles
New title	Prefect Apostolic of Western Transvaal; 1965–1978	Succeeded by himself as Diocesan Bishop
Preceded by himself as Apostolic Prefect	Bishop of Klerksdorp; 1978–1994	Succeeded by Zithulele Patrick Mvemve
