= Paul Mandla Khumalo =

South African Catholic prelate (born 1947

The Most Reverend Paul Mandla Khumalo
- Archbishop Emeritus of Pretoria, South Africa
- Church: Catholic Church
- Archdiocese: Roman Catholic Archdiocese of Pretoria
- See: Pretoria
- Appointed: 24 November 2008
- Installed: 24 November 2008
- Term ended: 15 December 2009
- Predecessor: George Francis Daniel (28 April 1975 - 24 November 2008)
- Successor: William Matthew Slattery (23 December 2010 - 30 April 2019)
- Other posts: Bishop of Witbank (2 October 2001 - 24 November 2008); Bishop of South Africa, Military (24 November 2008 - 15 December 2009)

Orders
- Ordination: 28 April 1973
- Consecration: 27 January 2002 by Cardinal Wilfrid Fox Napier
- Rank: Bishop

Personal details
- Born: Paul Mandla Khumalo; 5 February 1947 (age 79) Saint Wendolins, Diocese of Mariannhill, KwaZulu Natal, Union of South Africa

Styles of Paul Mandla Khumalo
- Reference style: Your Lordship; The Most Reverend
- Spoken style: His Lordship
- Religious style: Bishop

Paul Mandla Khumalo C.M.M. (born 2 February 1947) is a South African Catholic prelate who served as the archbishop of the Roman Catholic Archdiocese of Pretoria, in South Africa from 24 November 2008 until his early resignation on 15 December 2009. While archbishop, he concurrently served as the bishop of the South African Military. Before that, from 2 October 2001 until 24 November 2008, he was the bishop of the Roman Catholic Diocese of Witbank, South Africa. He was appointed bishop by Pope John Paul II. He was consecrated at Witbank on 27 January 2002 by Cardinal Wilfrid Fox Napier, Archbishop of Durban. On 24 November 2008, Pope Benedict XVI elevated him to archbishop and appointed him as the local ordinary at Pretoria. He was simultaneously appointed Bishop of the Military of South Africa. The Holy Father accepted Bishop Khumalo's early resignation on 15 December 2009, two months shy of his 63rd birthday. He is a professed member of the Mariannhillers, a Catholic religious Oder.

== Background and education ==
He was born on 5 February 1947 in Saint Wendolins, Diocese of Mariannhill, KwaZulu Natal, in South Africa. He studied at the Ixopo Minor Seminary at Ixopo, Kwazulu-Natal. He studied philosophy at the Saint Augustine's Major Seminary, in Roma, Lesotho. He then studied theology at the Saint Joseph Christian College London, United Kingdom.

== Priest ==
He was ordained a priest for the Congregation of Mariannhill Missionaries, on 28 April 1973. He served as a priest until 2 October 2001. While a priest, he served in various roles and locations including:

- Parish priest of Umzinto Parish in Umzinto from 1973 until 1974.
- Studies in Canada, at the Divine Word International Center of Religious Education, in London, Ontario from 1974 until 1976.
- Studies at the St. Paul's University, in Ottawa from 1974 until 1976.
- Parish priest and director of vocations from 1976 until 1980.
- Master of novices from 1981 until 1987.
- Parish priest at the Mariathal Catholic Mission from 1987 until 1992.
- Provincial superior in South Africa and member of the Directorate of the Conference of Major Superiors from 1993 until 1996.
- Vicar General of his Congregation in Rome, Italy from 1996 until 2001.

== Bishop ==
On 2 October 2001, Pope John Paul II appointed him bishop of the Roman Catholic Diocese of Witbank. He was consecrated at Witbank on 27 January 2002 by Cardinal Wilfrid Fox Napier, Archbishop of Durban assisted by George Francis Daniel, Archbishop of Pretoria and Dominic Joseph Chwane Khumalo , Titular Bishop of Buxentum.

On 24 November 2008, Pope Benedict XVI elevated Paul Mandla Khumalo to archbishop and transferred him to the Archdiocese of Pretoria as the local ordinary. The Holy Father concurrently appointed him as the local ordinary of the Military of South Africa. On 15 December 2009, The Holy Father accepted the resignation tendered by Archbishop Paul Mandla Khumalo from the pastoral care of the Ecclesiastical Metropolitan Province of Pretoria and from that of the military ordinary of the South African Defense Forces.

== See also ==
- Catholic Church in South Africa

== Succession table ==
Catholic Church titles
Preceded by George Francis Daniel (28 April 1975 - 24 November 2008)	Archbishop of Pretoria (24 November 2008 - 15 December 2009)	Succeeded by William Matthew Slattery (23 December 2010 - 30 April 2019)
Preceded by Mogale Paul Nkhumishe (9 January 1984 - 17 February 2000)	Bishop of Witbank (2 October 2001 - 24 November 2008)	Succeeded by Giuseppe Sandri (6 November 2009 - 30 May 2019)
