= Zithulele Patrick Mvemve =

South African bishop (1941–2020)

- Bishop of Klerksdorp
- Church: Catholic Church
- Diocese: Diocese of Klerksdorp
- In office: 26 March 1994 – 26 April 2013
- Predecessor: Daniel Verstraete
- Successor: Victor Hlolo Phalana
- Previous posts: Titular Bishop of Luperciana (1986-1994); Auxiliary Bishop of Johannesburg (1986-1994)

Orders
- Ordination: 29 June 1969
- Consecration: 29 June 1986 by Reginald Joseph Orsmond

Personal details
- Born: 31 May 1941 Evaton, Transvaal, Union of South Africa, British Empire
- Died: 6 July 2020 (aged 79)

Zithulele Patrick Mvemve (31 May 1941 – 6 July 2020) was a South African Roman Catholic bishop.

Mvemve was born in Evaton, South Africa, and educated at St Martin de Porres High School in Soweto.

He studied for the priesthood at St. Peter's Seminary in Hammanskraal, Pretoria. He was ordained to the priesthood in 1969; he served as titular bishop of Luperciani and auxiliary bishop of the Roman Catholic Archdiocese of Johannesburg from 1988 to 1994, and as bishop of the Roman Catholic Diocese of Klerksdorp, South Africa, from 1994 to 2013.
