= Diocese of Kokstad =

Latin Catholic diocese in South Africa

Coordinates: 33.5833°S 22.2000°E

Diocese of Kokstad Dioecesis Kokstadensis

Location
- Country: South Africa
- Metropolitan: Durban

Statistics
- Area: 17,635.5 km^{2} (6,809.1 sq mi)
- Population: Total; Catholics: (as of 2004); 1,300,000; 72,000 (5.5%)

Information
- Denomination: Catholic Church
- Sui iuris church: Latin Church
- Rite: Roman Rite
- Cathedral: St. Patrick's Cathedral
- Language: IsiXhosa; Sesotho; English

Current leadership
- Pope: Leo XIV
- Bishop: Thulani Victor Mbuyisa, C.M.M.

The Diocese of Kokstad (Latin: Kokstaden(sis)) is a Latin Catholic diocese located in the city of Kokstad in the ecclesiastical province of Durban in South Africa.

== History ==
- April 8, 1935: Established as Apostolic Prefecture of Mount Currie from the Apostolic Vicariate of Mariannhill
- July 11, 1939: Promoted as Apostolic Vicariate of Kokstad
- January 11, 1951: Promoted as Diocese of Kokstad

== Special churches ==
The cathedral is the St. Patrick's Cathedral in Kokstad.

== Leadership ==
Prefect Apostolic of Mount Currie

- Father Biagio Sigibaldo Kurz, O.F.M. (1935 – 1939.07.11)

Vicars Apostolic of Kokstad

- Bishop Biagio Sigibaldo Kurz, O.F.M. (1939.07.11 – 1948.05.21), appointed Prefect of Lingling [Yungchow], China
- Bishop John Evangelist McBride, O.F.M. (1949.04.21 – 1951.01.11)

Bishops of Kokstad

- Bishop John Evangelist McBride, O.F.M. (1951.01.11 – 1978.05.15)
- Bishop Wilfrid Fox Napier, O.F.M. (1980.11.29 – 1992.05.29), appointed Archbishop of Durban in 1992 (cardinal in 2001)
- Bishop William Slattery, O.F.M. (1993.11.17 – 2010.12.23), appointed Archbishop of Pretoria and Bishop of South Africa, Military
- Bishop Zolile Peter Mpambani, S.C.I. (2013.05.06 – 2020.04.01), appointed Archbishop of Bloemfontein
- Bishop Thulani Victor Mbuyisa, C.M.M. (2022.04.06 – present)

== See also ==
- Catholic Church in South Africa

== Sources ==
- GCatholic.org
- Catholic Hierarchy
