= Military ordinariate =

Catholic ecclesiastical jurisdiction providing religious services for armed forces

A military ordinariate is an ecclesiastical jurisdiction of the Catholic Church, of the Latin or an Eastern church, responsible for the pastoral care of Catholics serving in the armed forces of a nation. Some nations also have military ordinariates of the Anglican Communion, Lutheranism, and Eastern Orthodoxy. (Note: See, for example, the Anglican military ordinariate serving the Canadian Armed Forces.)

== History ==
The Sacred Consistorial Congregation established military vicariates in its 1951 instruction Sollemne semper. The Second Vatican Council (1965) encouraged bishops to establish military vicariates to provide for the spiritual care of Catholics serving within military institutions. The importance of cooperation between a military vicariate and the diocesan bishops was noted at the same time.

Until 1986, they were called "military vicariates" and had a status similar to that of apostolic vicariates, which are headed by a bishop who receives his authority by delegation from the Pope. The apostolic constitution Spirituali militum curae of 21 April 1986 raised their status, declaring that the bishop who heads one of them is an "ordinary", holding authority by virtue of his office, and not by delegation from another person in authority. It likened the military vicariates to dioceses. Each of them is headed by a bishop, who may have the personal rank of archbishop. If the bishop is a diocesan, he is likely to delegate the daily functions to an auxiliary bishop or a lower cleric.

The personal ordinariates for Anglicans entering the Catholic Church announced on 20 October 2009 are similar in some ways to the existing military ordinariates. But the jurisdiction of military ordinariates is cumulative to that of the diocesan bishops.

== List of Catholic military ordinariates ==
Country	Military Ordinariate	Notes
Africa
Kenya	Military Ordinariate of Kenya	created military vicariate and first military vicar appointment 20 January 1964; elevated to a military ordinariate 21 July 1986
South Africa	Military Ordinariate of the South African Defence Force	created military vicariate and first military vicar appointment 17 May 1951; elevated to a military ordinariate 21 July 1986; it is vested in the Archbishop of Pretoria
Uganda	Military Ordinariate of Uganda	created military vicariate and first military vicar appointment 20 January 1964; elevated to a military ordinariate 21 July 1986; vested in a Metropolitan
Americas
Argentina	Military Ordinariate of Argentina	created military vicariate 8 July 1957; first military vicar appointment in 1957; elevated to a military ordinariate 21 July 1986
Bolivia	Military Ordinariate of Bolivia	created military vicariate 19 March 1961; first appointment military vicar 26 July 1961; elevated to a military ordinariate 21 July 1986
Brazil	Military Ordinariate of Brazil	created military vicariate and first military vicar appointment 6 November 1950; elevated to a military ordinariate 21 July 1986
Canada	Military Ordinariate of Canada	first military bishop appointment 20 September 1939; created military vicariate 17 February 1951; elevated to a military ordinariate 21 July 1986
Chile	Military Ordinariate of Chile	created military vicariate 3 May 1910; first military vicar appointment 27 May 1910; elevated to a military ordinariate 21 July 1986
Colombia	Military Ordinariate of Colombia	created military vicariate 13 October 1949; first military vicar appointment 14 July 1950; elevated to a military ordinariate 21 July 1986
Dominican Republic	Military Ordinariate of Dominican Republic	created military vicariate 23 January 1958; first military vicar appointment 1958; elevated to a military ordinariate 21 July 1986
Ecuador	Military Ordinariate of Ecuador	created military vicariate 30 March 1983; first military vicar appointment 5 August 1983; elevated to a military ordinariate 21 July 1986
El Salvador	Military Ordinariate of El Salvador	created military vicariate 25 March 1968; first military vicar appointment 4 November 1968; elevated to a military ordinariate 21 July 1986
Paraguay	Military Ordinariate of Paraguay	created military vicariate 20 December 1961; first military vicar appointment 7 December 1965; elevated to a military ordinariate 21 July 1986
Peru	Military Ordinariate of Peru	created military vicariate 15 May 1943; first military vicar appointment 13 January 1945; elevated to a military ordinariate 21 July 1986
United States	Archdiocese for the Military Services, USA	first military bishop appointment 24 November 1917; created military vicariate in November 1939; elevated to a military ordinariate 21 July 1986; headed by an archbishop with three auxiliary bishops
Venezuela	Military Ordinariate of Venezuela	created military ordinariate 31 October 1995; first military ordinary appointment 11 February 1996
Asia
Indonesia	Military Ordinariate of Indonesia	created military vicariate 25 December 1949; first military vicar appointment 1949; elevated to a military ordinariate 21 July 1986
Philippines	Military Ordinariate of the Philippines	created military vicariate 8 December 1950; first military vicar appointment 10 December 1951; elevated to a military ordinariate 21 July 1986
South Korea	Military Ordinariate of South Korea	created military vicariate and first military vicar appointment 22 November 1983; elevated to a military ordinariate 21 July 1986
Europe
Austria	Military Ordinariate of Austria	first military bishop appointment in 1773; created military vicariate 21 February 1959; elevated to a military ordinariate 21 July 1986
Bosnia and Herzegovina	Military Ordinariate of Bosnia and Herzegovina	created military ordinariate 1 February 2011
Belgium	Military Ordinariate of Belgium	created military vicariate 7 September 1957; first military vicar appointment in 1957; elevated to a military ordinariate 21 July 1986; vested in the Archbishop of Mechelen and Primate of Belgium
Croatia	Military Ordinariate of Croatia	created military ordinariate and first military ordinary appointment 25 April 1997
France	Diocese of the French Armed Forces	first military bishop appointment in 1949; created military vicariate 26 July 1952; elevated to a military ordinariate 21 July 1986
Germany	Military Ordinariate of Germany	first military bishop appointment 22 May 1868; created military vicariate 20 July 1933; elevated to a military ordinariate 21 July 1986
Hungary	Military Ordinariate of Hungary	first military bishop appointment 23 March 1920; in abeyance from 1947 to 1994; created a military ordinariate 18 April 1994
Italy	Military Ordinariate in Italy	created military vicariate 6 March 1925; first military vicar appointment 23 April 1929; elevated to a military ordinariate 21 July 1986
Lithuania	Military Ordinariate of Lithuania	created military ordinariate and first military vicar appointment 25 November 2000
Netherlands	Military Ordinariate of the Netherlands	created military vicariate and first military vicar appointment 16 April 1957; elevated to a military ordinariate 21 July 1986
Poland	Military Ordinariate of Poland	created military vicariate and first military vicar appointment 5 February 1919; suspended from 1947 to 1991; elevated to a military ordinariate 1991
Portugal	Military Ordinariate of Portugal	created military vicariate 29 May 1966; first military vicar appointment 1966; elevated to a military ordinariate 21 July 1986
Slovakia	Military Ordinariate of Slovakia	created military ordinariate and first military vicar appointment 20 January 2003
Slovenia	Military Vicariate of Slovenia	created military vicariate and first military vicar appointment 21 September 2000
Spain	Military Archbishopric of Spain	created military vicariate in early 1700s (Carlos de Borja y Centellas first appointment); vacant from 1930 to 1950; re-established military vicariate 5 August 1950; elevated to a military ordinariate 21 July 1986; headed by an archbishop
United Kingdom	Bishopric of the Forces in Great Britain	first military bishop appointment 30 October 1917; created military vicariate 21 November 1953; elevated to a military ordinariate 21 July 1986
Oceania
Australia	Catholic Diocese of the Australian Military Services	first military bishop appointment in 1912; created military vicariate 6 March 1969; elevated to a military ordinariate 21 July 1986
New Zealand	Military Ordinariate of New Zealand	created military vicariate and first military vicar appointment 28 October 1976; elevated to a military ordinariate 21 July 1986; currently vested in the Metropolitan of Wellington

== See also ==
- Catholic Church hierarchy § Equivalents of diocesan bishops in law
- Military chaplain
- Patron saints of the military
- Blue Mass
