= Thulani Victor Mbuyisa =

South African Catholic prelate

The Most Reverend Thulani Victor Mbuyisa
- Bishop of Kokstad
- Church: Roman Catholic Church
- Archdiocese: Durban
- Diocese: Kokstad

Orders
- Consecration: 11 June 2022

Personal details
- Born: Thulani Victor Mbuyisa; 13 February 1973 (age 53) Exobho, South Africa
- Coat of arms

Thulani Victor Mbuyisa (born 13 February 1973) is a South African Roman Catholic priest who was appointed Bishop of the Roman Catholic Diocese of Kokstad, in South Africa, on 6 April 2022.

== Background and priesthood ==
He was born on 13 February in Exobho, in KwaZulu-Natal, in the Roman Catholic Archdiocese of Durban. He studied philosophy and theology at St. Joseph's Theological Institute in Cedara in South Africa. He entered the Congregation of Mariannhill Missionaries in 1992 and made his perpetual vows on 2 February 1997. He was ordained a priest on 4 March 2000 at Mariannhill by Bishop Paul Themba Mngoma† of Mariannhill.

He served as Parish Vicar of St. Michael's Mission, then as Chaplain of Mangosuthu University of Technology and of St. Francis College of Mariannhill and vice-director of Novices. From 2002 until 2004, he studied for and obtained a Licentiate of Canon Law from Saint Paul University in Ottawa, Canada. He returned to his station in South Africa until 2007.

In 2007, he was relocated to Nairobi, Kenya, serving there as the Superior and formator at the Nivard House Formation House. In 2010, he was elevated to Provincial Superior of the Mariannhill Missionaries in East Africa. From October 2016 up to the time he was appointed bishop, he was the Superior General of the same Congregation, based in Rome.

== As bishop ==
On 6 April 2022, Pope Francis appointed Father Thulani Victor Mbuyisa, C.M.M. as Bishop of the Roman Catholic Diocese of Kokstad, South Africa. Mbuyisa was ordained as a bishop on 11 June 2022 at Kokstad by Archbishop Zolile Peter Mpambani, S.C.I., Archbishop of Bloemfontein assisted by Cardinal Wilfrid Fox Napier, O.F.M., Archbishop Emeritus of Durban and Archbishop Siegfried Mandla Jwara, C.M.M., Archbishop of Durban.

Catholic Church titles
Preceded by Zolile Peter Mpambani (2013 - 2020)	Bishop of Roman Catholic Diocese of Kokstad; 2022 -	Succeeded by Incumbent
