= St John Vianney Seminary, Pretoria =

South African Catholic institution

St John Vianney Seminary
- Motto: Fides et Ratio
- Motto in English: Faith and Reason
- Type: Private, Seminary
- Established: April 14, 1948
- Accreditation: SAQA
- Affiliations: Franciscans(1948-1998)
- Religious affiliation: Catholic
- Academic affiliations: Pontifical Urban University, Rome
- President: Fr. Wellington Ncedo Siwundla
- Students: 150
- Location: Pretoria, South Africa; 25.7768159°S 28.2270295°E
- Website: sjv.ac.za

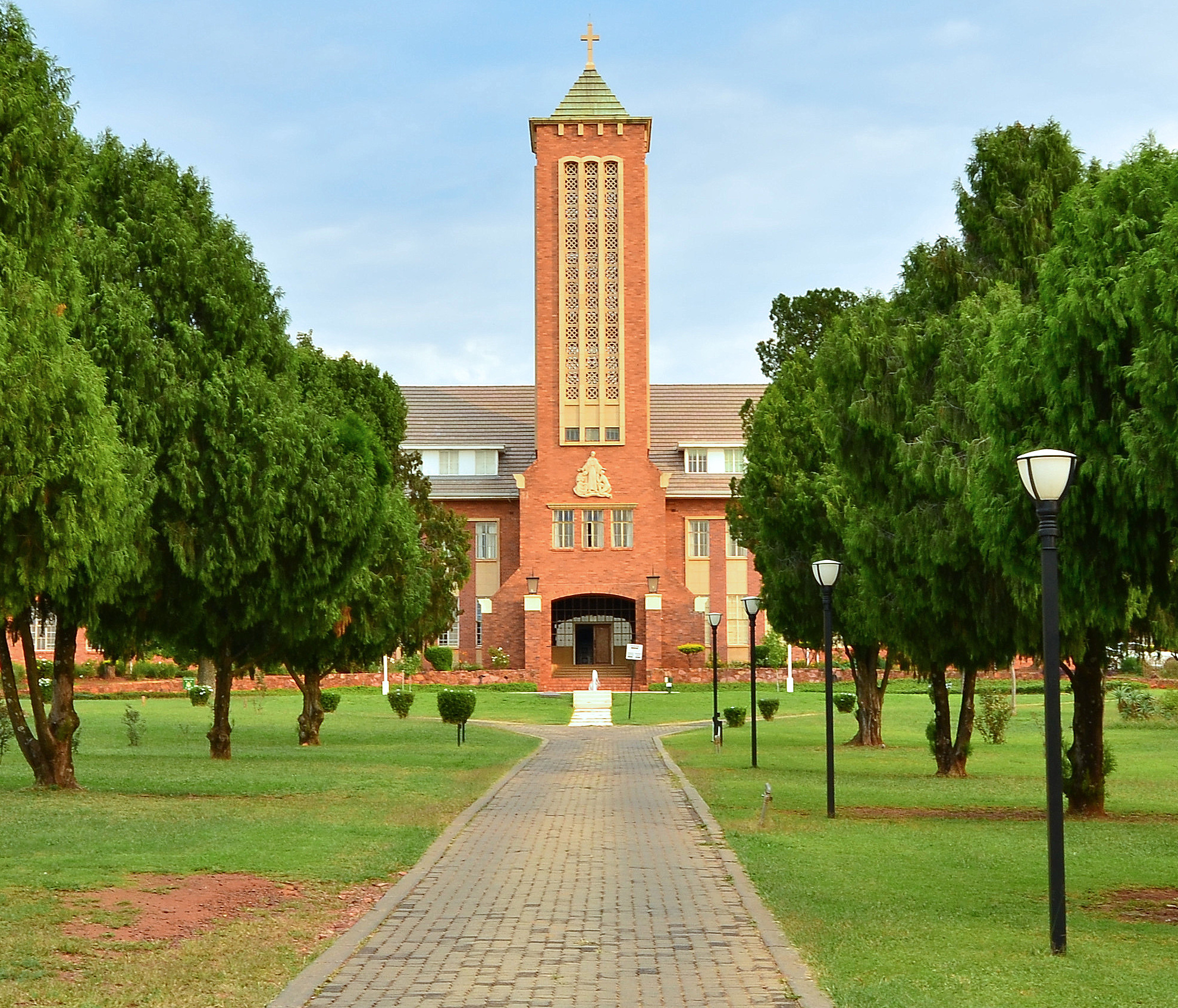
St John Vianney Seminary, Pretoria

St John Vianney Seminary, Pretoria, South Africa, is the National Seminary for the Roman Catholic Church in South Africa. The institution is a training facility and House of Formation under the auspices of the Southern African Catholic Bishops' Conference (SACBC).

== History ==
St John Vianney was opened on 14 April 1948, by Archbishop Martin Lucas SVD, initially it was housed in temporary quarters at Queenstown prior to the completion of constructing the seminary in Waterkloof, Pretoria. In 1950 the seminary moved to Pretoria, it was officially opened in March 1951 and staffed by Irish Franciscans. In the climate of apartheid, St. Vianney initially catered for white South Africans, where as another seminary was set up St Peter's Seminary in Pevensey, KwaZulu-Natal, then in Hammanskraal and later in Garsfontein, to train indigenous priests so catered for the black Africans, and from 1956 administered by the Dominican Order. The BA in Theology began being offered in 1967. Theology students were able to gain a Bachelor of Sacred Theology (BST) degree issued through the Pontifical Urban University, Rome, which the seminary had become affiliated to in 1964. From 1948 until 1998, the Seminary was administered by the Franciscans. To make up for the departure of the Franciscans, a number of Jesuit academics joined the staff of the seminary. In 1995 the seminary signed an agreement with the University of South Africa (Unisa) for the delivery of post-graduate Catholic theological studies undertaken through Unisa. Also in 1995 the link with the Pontifical Urban University, Rome was renewed. In 1999 the Higher Diploma in Ministry, which had been introduced a year earlier by Rector Dlungwane, was validated by the South African Qualifications Authority.

As a private education provider, the Bachelor of Philosophy (BPhil) and Bachelor of Theology (BTh) degrees are registered with the South African governments' Council on Higher Education.

The Bishops decided to close St Peter's seminary, in Garsfontein, east of Pretoria, and in 2008 philosophy students became part of St John Vianney seminary.

== Rectors/Presidents ==
- Fergus Barrett OFM, (1948-1966)
- Norbett Carroll OFM, (1967-1972)
- Bernard Frank Doyle OFM (1972-1976)
- Myles Russell OFM (1977-1984)
- William Slattery OFM, (1985-1991), later Archbishop of Pretoria
- Graham Rose, (1991-1997), alumni and first non-franciscan rector, Bishop of Dundee
- Mlungisi Pius Dlungwane, (1997- 2000) the first black rector.
- Mike Lewis SJ, (2000-2001) acting rector
- Sithembele Sipuka, (2000-2008), Alumnus, lecturer, now Bishop of Mthatha, President of the SACBC
- Enrico Parry (2008-2011), alumnus, professor dean, vice-rctor before being rector/president of the seminary, also served as acting rector of St. Peter's seminary(2006-2007)
- Molewe Machingoane, (2011-2015),
- Paul Manci, (2015-2018)
- Mons. Masilo John Selemela, (2019- 2022)
- Wellington Ncedo Siwundla, (2022- )

== Alumni ==
- Father Cyril Axelrod OBE, is a deaf, a now also blind, Redemptorist priest
- Archbishop Stephen Brislin, Archbishop of Cape Town
- Bishop Reginald Cawcutt, Auxiliary Bishop of Cape Town
- Bishop Michael Gower Coleman, Bishop of Port Elizabeth
- Archbishop Abel Gabuza, Archbishop Coadjutor of the Archdiocese of Durban
- Fr. Bonaventure Hinwood OFM, franciscan priest and Afrikaans poet.
- Bishop Joseph Kizito, Bishop of Aliwal
- Bishop Robert Mogapi Mphiwe, Bishop of Rustenburg
- Bishop Graham Rose, former rector, Bishop of Dundee
- Bishop Vincent Mduduzi Zungu, Bishop of Port Elizabeth
