= Diocese of Polokwane =

Latin Catholic diocese in South Africa

Coordinates: 23.9000°S 29.4500°E

Diocese of Polokwane Dioecesis Polokwanensis

Location
- Country: South Africa
- Metropolitan: Pretoria

Statistics
- Area: 69,533 km^{2} (26,847 sq mi)
- Population: Total; Catholics: (as of 2004); 2,500,000; 86,268 (3.5%)

Information
- Denomination: Catholic Church
- Sui iuris church: Latin Church
- Rite: Roman Rite
- Cathedral: Sacred heart cathedral

Current leadership
- Pope: Leo XIV
- Bishop: Jeremiah Madimetja Masela
- Vicar General: Selemela Clement

The Diocese of Polokwane (Latin: Polokwanen(sis)) is a Latin Catholic diocese located in the city of Polokwane in the ecclesiastical province of Pretoria in South Africa.

== History ==
- December 22, 1910: Established as Apostolic Prefecture of Northern Transvaal from the Apostolic Vicariate of Transvaal
- June 13, 1939: Promoted as Territorial Prelature of Pietersburg
- December 15, 1988: Promoted as Diocese of Pietersburg
- September 4, 2009: Name changed - Diocese of Polokwane

== Special churches ==
- The Sacred Heart Cathedral on Biccard Street is the seat of the Bishop

.

== Leadership ==
- Prefects Apostolic of Northern Transvaal (Roman rite)
  - Fr. Ildefonso Lanslots, O.S.B. (1911 – 1922)
  - Fr. Salvatore van Nuffel, O.S.B. (1922.03.21 – 1939)
- Prelates of Pietersburg (Roman rite)
  - Bishop Frederic Osterrath, O.S.B. (1939.11.14 – 1952)
  - Bishop Francis Clement van Hoeck, O.S.B. (1954.01.06 – 1975)
  - Bishop Fulgence Werner Le Roy, O.S.B. (1975.07.10 – 1988.12.15 see below)
- Bishops of Pietersburg (Roman rite)
  - Bishop Fulgence Werner Le Roy, O.S.B. (see above 1988.12.15 – 2000.02.17)
  - Bishop Mogale Paul Nkhumishe (2000.02.17 - 2009.09.04 see below)
- Bishops of Polokwane (Roman rite)
  - Bishop Mogale Paul Nkhumishe (see above 2009.09.04 - 2011.12.09)
  - Bishop Jeremiah Madimetja Masela (2013.06.10 - present)

== See also ==
- Roman Catholicism in South Africa
- Pietersburg Abbey

== Sources ==
- GCatholic.org ^{[self-published]}
- Catholic Hierarchy ^{[self-published]}
