= William Slattery =

Irish-born Catholic Franciscan archbishop

William Slattery OFM
- Archbishop Emeritus of Pretoria
- Church: Catholic Church
- Archdiocese: Archdiocese of Pretoria
- In office: 23 December 2010 – 30 April 2019
- Predecessor: Paul Mandla Khumalo
- Successor: Dabula Mpako
- Other posts: Apostolic Administrator of Mariannhill (2020-2022); Military Ordinary of South Africa (2010-2019)
- Previous post: Bishop of Kokstad (1993-2010)

Orders
- Ordination: 21 February 1970
- Consecration: 19 February 1994 by Wilfrid Napier

Personal details
- Born: 6 September 1943 (age 82) Portlaoise, County Laois, Ireland
- Education: University College Galway; Pontifical University of Saint Anthony; University of South Africa

William Matthew Slattery, O.F.M., is an Irish-born Franciscan who served as Bishop of Kokstad from 1993 to 2010, before being appointed Archbishop of Pretoria and Bishop of South Africa, Military.

== Biography ==
William Mathew Slattery was born at Portlaoise on 6 September 1943; he is a native of Killenaule, County Tipperary, Ireland. Following secondary school in Gormanston College, Liam joined the Franciscans in 1962, attending the Killarney Noviciate, and gained a BA degree from University College Galway. He moved to St. Isidore's College in Rome in order to attend lectures at the Pontifical University of St. Anthony (Antonianum). He obtained the S.T.B. (1968), the S.T.L. (1970) and a Diploma in Christian Archaeology at the Antonianum. He was ordained in Rome in 1970, before going to South Africa in 1971. He served in various dioceses in South Africa and also in Malawi; he has also been Rector of St John Vianney Seminary, Pretoria, where he also lecturered in Church History from 1985 till 1991. While at Saint John Vianney Seminary, he also completed a degree course in anthropology at the University of South Africa(Unisa).

In 1993 he was appointed Bishop of Kokstad. In 2005 he invited the Irish charity Respond! (founded by his fellow Franciscans) to provide services in the diocese, and in 2009 supported their setting up of a housing association, Silvie. In 2010 he was appointed Archbishop of Pretoria. He retired in 2019, and was succeeded by Archbishop Dabula Mpako.
