= Boniface Tshosa Setlalekgosi =

Botswana Roman Catholic bishop (1927–2019)

- Bishop of Gaborone
- Church: Catholic Church
- Diocese: Diocese of Gaborone
- In office: 30 November 1981 – 5 February 2009
- Predecessor: Urban Charles Joseph Murphy
- Successor: Valentine Tsamma Seane

Orders
- Ordination: 22 July 1963
- Consecration: 6 March 1982 by Peter Fanyana John Butelezi

Personal details
- Born: 14 September 1927 Serowe, Bechuanaland Protectorate, British Empire
- Died: 25 January 2019 (aged 91) Gaborone, Botswana

Boniface Tshosa Setlalekgosi (14 September 1927 – 25 January 2019) was the Roman Catholic bishop of the Diocese of Gaborone, Botswana, from 1981 until 2009. A convert to Catholicism, in 1957 he started his priesthood training at St Josephs Seminary at Chishawasha in the then Salisbury, Rhodesia. Setlalekgosi became an ordained priest in 1963. He succeeded Urban Charles Joseph Murphy to become the second Roman Catholic bishop in Botswana's history.

Catholic Church titles
Preceded by Urban Charles Joseph Murphy	Bishop of the Diocese of Gaborone; 30 November 1981 – 5 February 2009	Succeeded by Valentine Tsamma Seane
