= Mogale Paul Nkhumishe =

- Bishop of Polokwane
- Church: Catholic Church
- Diocese: Diocese of Polokwane
- In office: 17 February 2000 – 9 December 2011
- Predecessor: Fulgence Werner Le Roy
- Successor: Jeremiah Madimetja Masela
- Previous posts: Bishop of Witbank (1987-2000); Bishop of Lydenburg–Witbank (1984-1987); Titular Bishop of Tigisis in Numidia (1981-1984); Auxiliary Bishop of Lydenburg–Witbank (1981-1984)

Orders
- Ordination: 24 June 1967
- Consecration: 14 February 1982 by Peter Fanyana John Butelezi

Personal details
- Born: 28 February 1938 Nylstroom, Transvaal Province, Union of South Africa, British Empire
- Died: 29 June 2012 (aged 74)

Mogale Paul Thomas Nkumishe (28 February 1938 – 29 June 2012) was the Roman Catholic bishop of the Roman Catholic Diocese of Polokwane, South Africa.

Nkhumishe, the son of Cornelius and Agatha Motlhago Nkhumishe, was born in Klein Nyls Oog near the town of Nylstroom. Ordained to the priesthood in 1967, Nkhumishe was named a titular bishop in 1981; he resigned in 2011.

He was appointed Bishop of Lydenburg-Witbank on 9 January 1984, a post he held until 17 February 2000 when he became Bishop of Pietersburg (renamed in 2009 to Polokwane).

He had his primary education in Vaalbos primary school from 1948 to 1953. He then moved to Bela Bela Catholic School where he studied from 1954 to 1956. It is here that he slowly discovered his vocation to priesthood.
