= Michael Rowland (prelate) =

South African religious leader (1929–2012)

Michael Vincent Paschal Rowland, OFM (18 March 1929 – 23 September 2012) was the Roman Catholic bishop of the Roman Catholic diocese of Dundee, KwaZulu-Natal, South Africa. Ordained to the priesthood in 1953, Rowland was named bishop in 1985 and retired in 2005.

Rowland was third child to be born to Cyril Francis Rowland and Jean Grace, née Vallis. He attended St Thomas of Canterbury Catholic Primary School, Grays, and the St. Bonaventure School. During World War II he served in the Royal Air Force. After the war he joined the Franciscan Order as a novice; he took his first vow on 13 October 1946. He received his training by the Franciscan House of Studies in East Bergholt on 21 March 1953, the ordination. He was first chaplain in the parish of Aldridge / Shelfield in Birmingham.

In 1955 he went to South Africa. Rowland initially worked in Ermelo and Bethal in Mpumalanga. In 1956 he studied the Zulu language in a Benedictine mission station in Zululand. In 1958 he became a pastor in Dundee in the newly created apostolic prefecture of Volksrust, later he was active in the mission areas of Ladysmith and Mhlumayo. In 1965 he was superior of the English Province's Franciscan mission in South Africa and was involved in a merger of the Franciscan missionary activities in South Africa. He set up administrative structures and built a novitiate. In 1977, he became the first president of the Franciscan Federation of Southern Africa and Rhodesia. Pope John Paul II appointed him as the first Bishop of Dundee. He built the management of the new diocese, and was responsible for the construction of 83 churches, 20 kindergartens, a children's home, a nursing home, 15 primary schools, 3 secondary schools, 7 religious convents, four clinics and two pastoral centres.
