= Diocese of Kimberley (Catholic) =

Latin Catholic diocese in South Africa

Coordinates: 33.5833°S 22.2000°E

Diocese of Kimberley Dioecesis Kimberleyensis

Location
- Country: South Africa
- Metropolitan: Bloemfontein

Statistics
- Area: 123,083 km^{2} (47,523 sq mi)
- Population: Total; Catholics: (as of 2004); 1,740,000; 117,335 (6.7%)

Information
- Denomination: Catholic Church
- Sui iuris church: Latin Church
- Rite: Roman Rite

Current leadership
- Pope: Leo XIV
- Bishop: Duncan Theodore Tsoke

The Diocese of Kimberley (Latin: Kimberleyen(sis)) is a Latin Catholic diocese of the Catholic Church based in the city of Kimberley in the ecclesiastical province of Bloemfontein in South Africa. The seat of the bishop is the Cathedral of St. Mary in Kimberley.

== History ==
- 4 June 1886: Established as Vicariate Apostolic of Kimberley in Orange from Apostolic Vicariate of Cape of Good Hope, Eastern District and Apostolic Vicariate of Natal
- 1918: Renamed as Apostolic Vicariate of Kimberley in South Africa
- 11 January 1951: Promoted as Diocese of Kimberley

== Bishops ==
- Vicar Apostolic of Kimberley in Orange (Roman rite)
  - Bishop Matteo Gaughren, O.M.I. (1902.01.13 – 1914.05.30)
- Vicar Apostolic of Kimberley in South Africa (Roman rite)
  - Bishop Herman Joseph Meysing, O.M.I. (1929.12.19 – 1951.01.11), appointed Archbishop of Bloemfontein
- Bishops of Kimberley (Roman rite)
  - Bishop John Boekenfoehr, O.M.I. (1953.03.24 – 1974.07.01)
  - Bishop Erwin Hecht, O.M.I. (1974.07.01 - 2009)
  - Bishop Abel Gabuza (23 December 2010 – 9 December 2018)
  - Bishop Duncan Theodore Tsoke (3 March 2021 – present)

=== Auxiliary Bishop ===
- Erwin Hecht, O.M.I. (1972–1974), appointed Bishop here

== See also ==
- Catholic Church in South Africa

== Sources ==
- GCatholic.org
- Catholic Hierarchy
