= Abel Gabuza =

South African archbishop (1955–2021)

- Bishop of Kimberley
- Church: Catholic Church
- Diocese: Diocese of Kimberley
- In office: 23 December 2010 – 9 December 2018
- Predecessor: Erwin Hecht
- Successor: Duncan Theodore Tsoke
- Other post: Coadjutor Archbishop of Durban (2018-2021)

Orders
- Ordination: 15 December 1984
- Consecration: 19 March 2011 by Jabulani Adatus Nxumalo

Personal details
- Born: 23 March 1955 Alexandra, Transvaal, Union of South Africa, British Empire
- Died: 17 January 2021 (aged 65) Hillcrest, KwaZulu-Natal, South Africa

Abel Gabuza (23 March 1955 – 17 January 2021) was a South African Catholic prelate who served as Coadjutor Archbishop of Durban from 9 December 2018 and until his death in 2021. He was Bishop of Kimberley from 2010 to 2018.

== Early life and career ==
Gabuza was born on 23 March 1955 in Alexandra, South Africa. He was one of six children. His father died when he was young and his mother sent him to boarding school to provide a safer environment than the local schools. He studied at St. Paul Minor Seminary and St. Peter Major Seminary, both in Hammanskraal, interrupting his studies after the first year to spend a year as a factory worker, and then at the National Major Seminary of St. John Vianney. He was ordained a priest of the Archdiocese of Pretoria on 15 December 1984.

Gabuza worked in parish ministries from 1985 to 1987. He spent the 1987–1988 academic year earning a master's degree in theology at the Jesuit School of Theology in Berkeley, California. He returned to teach at the St. Paul Preparatory Seminary in Hammanskraal, serving as Rector of that seminary from 1991 to 1994. (Note: At the end of his tenure, the St. Paul Preparatory Seminary was transferred to Cape Town and changed its name to St. Francis Xavier.) He took up parish ministry again in 1995. In 1999 he became Vicar General of the Archdiocese of Pretoria, and in 2009 its Apostolic Administrator.

== Bishop and archbishop ==
Pope Benedict XVI appointed Gabuza Bishop of Kimberley on 23 December 2010. He received his episcopal consecration on 19 March 2011 from Jabulani Adatus Nxumalo, Archbishop of Bloemfontein. He became President of the Justice and Peace Commission of the Southern African Catholic Bishops' Conference and advocated for safeguarding workers's pension funds from government interference and the protection of miners' health. He also called for better child labour conditions and for efforts to be made to reduce arms trafficking.

On 9 December 2018, Pope Francis named Gabuza Archbishop Coadjutor of Durban to succeed Cardinal Wilfrid Napier.

At the February 2019 Vatican summit on sexual abuse, Gabuza disagreed with those who minimized the issue's significance in Africa. He said the sexual abuse of minors by family members was still too much a "secret". As for the clergy, he said "the abuse of minors can't be easily dismissed as a 'Western thing'." In April 2020, he supported government restrictions on public assemblies, included church services, in response to the COVID-19 pandemic and called on priests to find creative responses. He said: "the Church of Christ started small in homes not in big structures that we have today. In a way we are going back to our roots because each family is a domestic Church. When we come together on Sundays or any other day we gather as various domestic churches." He has also promoted alliances to combat AIDS/HIV along with gender-based violence through a program that works in local taverns.

Gabuza died from COVID-19 on 17 January 2021 at the age of 65 in Hillcrest Hospital near Durban during the COVID-19 pandemic in South Africa.
