= Diocese of Witbank =

Latin Catholic diocese in South Africa

Coordinates: 33.5833°S 22.2000°E

Diocese of Witbank Dioecesis Vitbankensis

Location
- Country: South Africa
- Metropolitan: Johannesburg

Statistics
- Area: 56,886 km^{2} (21,964 sq mi)
- Population: Total; Catholics: (as of 2004); 2,528,000; 103,278 (4.1%)

Information
- Denomination: Catholic Church
- Sui iuris church: Latin Church
- Rite: Roman Rite
- Cathedral: Christ the King Cathedral

Current leadership
- Pope: Leo XIV
- Bishop: Xolelo Thaddaeus Kumalo

The Diocese of Witbank (Latin: Vitbanken(sis)) is a Latin Catholic diocese located in the city of Witbank in the ecclesiastical province of Johannesburg in South Africa.

== History ==
- June 12, 1923: Established as Apostolic Prefecture of Lydenburg from the Apostolic Vicariate of Transvaal
- December 9, 1948: Promoted as Apostolic Vicariate of Lydenburg
- January 11, 1951: Promoted as Diocese of Lydenburg
- September 13, 1964: Renamed as Diocese of Lydenburg – Witbank
- November 10, 1987: Renamed as Diocese of Witbank

== Bishops ==
- Prefect Apostolic of Lydenburg (Roman rite)
  - Fr. Giovanni Riegler, M.C.C.I. (1939.06.30 – 1948.12.09 see below)
- Vicar Apostolic of Lydenburg (Roman rite)
  - Bishop Giovanni Riegler, M.C.C.I. (see above 1948.12.09 – 1951.01.11 see below)
- Bishops of Lydenburg (Roman rite)
  - Bishop Giovanni Riegler, M.C.C.I. (see above 1951.01.11 – 1955.10.06)
  - Bishop Anthony Reiterer, M.C.C.I. (1956.02.29 – 1964.09.13 see below)
- Bishops of Lydenburg – Witbank (Roman rite)
  - Bishop Anthony Reiterer, M.C.C.I. (see above 1964.09.13 – 1983.02.25)
  - Bishop Mogale Paul Nkhumishe (1984.01.09 – 1987.11.10 see below)
- Bishops of Witbank (Roman rite)
  - Bishop Mogale Paul Nkhumishe (see above 1987.11.10 – 2000.02.17), appointed Bishop of Pietersburg
  - Bishop Paul Mandla Khumalo, C.M.M. (2001.10.02 – 2008.11.24), appointed Archbishop of Pretoria
  - Bishop Giuseppe Sandri, M.C.C.J. (2009.11.05 – 2019.05.30)
  - Bishop Xolelo Thaddaeus Kumalo (since 2020.11.25)

=== Auxiliary Bishop ===
- Mogale Paul Nkhumishe (1981–1984), appointed Bishop here

=== Other priest of this diocese who became bishop ===
- João Noé Rodrigues, appointed Bishop of Tzaneen in 2010

== See also ==
- Roman Catholicism in South Africa

== Sources ==
- GCatholic.org
- Catholic Hierarchy
