= Dabula Mpako =

The Most Reverend Dabula Anthony Mpako
- Archbishop of Pretoria; Military Ordinary of South Africa
- Church: Roman Catholic Church
- Appointed: 30 April 2019
- Installed: 22 June 2019
- Predecessor: William Matthew Slattery
- Other post: Vice-President of the Southern African Episcopal Conference (2019-)
- Previous post: Bishop of Queenstown (2011-19)

Orders
- Ordination: 29 June 1986
- Consecration: 6 August 2011 by William Matthew Slattery

Personal details
- Born: Dabula Anthony Mpako; 6 September 1959 (age 67) Eastern Cape, South Africa
- Education: Loyola University Chicago
- Motto: That God may be all in all
- Coat of arms

Dabula Anthony Mpako (born 6 September 1959) is a South African prelate of the Catholic Church who was appointed as the Archbishop of Pretoria on 30 April 2019. His installation was celebrated on the following 22 June. He was also appointed as the Military Bishop of South Africa. He was Bishop of Queenstown from 2011 to 2019.

== Biography ==
Dabula Anthony Mpako was born on 6 September 1959 in Eastern Cape in the Diocese of Umtata. He began his priestly formation in 1980 at Major Seminary St. Augustine in Lesotho. On 29 June 1986 he was ordained a priest for the Archdiocese of Pretoria. From 1986 to 1987 he was assistant pastor of the parish attached to the Stigmatines congregation and from 1987 to 1990 he was first a lecturer and then Rector of the St. Paul Preparatory Seminary in Hammanskraal.

From 1991 to 1994 Mpako attended Loyola University Chicago, where he studied with Ann O'Hara Graff, earning a degree in pastoral studies. From 1994 to 1998 he was Rector of the Major Philosophical Seminary of St. Peter at Garsfontein.

In 1999, Mpako was one of the founders of the African Catholic Priests' Solidarity Movement (ACPSM) and as its secretary served as its spokesperson. The organization expressed a "profound sense of alienation" because the Church was still "an institution rooted in the colonial and apartheid past to one reflecting the cultural ethos of the black community". Mpako said the Church in South Africa was "eurocentric" in its theology and agenda.

In 2001, at the World Conference Against Racism held in South Africa, he discussed the history of the Church's role in Africa and criticized aspects of its contemporary practice. He said that "There was a close relationship between colonization and early missionary evangelisation" and that "The church of the early missionaries accepted the ideology of white European superiority", with religious institutions established first to serve white settlers and only later in inferior forms to black communities. He praised the Church's opposition to apartheid and Pope John Paul II's denunciation of racism but faulted the Church for its emphasis on individuals over structures. He said: "There is the tendency to focus on changing the heart in fighting racism. But if you focus on the systemic nature of racism, you are going to talk about how we are going to change the system at the same time as how we are going to change the heart." He said paternalism was still a dominant force in the hierarchy: "There is an idea of guardianship. The African is presented as a child who is under the perpetual guardianship of the European, who will decide when the African has evolved enough to be able to be given full responsibility of his or her life." He predicted an inevitable period of conflict: "Of course they [Europeans] are going to feel uncomfortable as we push up the African culture. So be it."

In 2003 he said the ACPSM was a "prophetic movement" and that only a few bishops had expressed support, while most reacted with "attempts to ignore us to discredit us". In 2003 the group issued an apology to African nuns, which Mpako summarized: “We acknowledged that we, as black priests, are the beneficiaries of a church system that disadvantages black sisters firstly as black nuns, secondly as women, and thirdly as nuns. They suffer the effects of racism that still exist, and they suffer as women because of sexism."

From 1999 to 2019 he was pastor at parishes in Mabopane, Capital Park, and Monavoni, and for several years was Vicar forane for the North-Western Deanery of the Archdiocese of Pretoria.

Pope Benedict XVI named Mpako Bishop of Queenstown on 23 May 2011. He received his episcopal consecration on 6 August from Archbishop William Slattery of Pretoria. In August 2018 he was elected first Vice President of the Southern African Catholic Bishops' Conference (SACBC).

On 30 April 2019, Pope Francis named him Archbishop of Pretoria and Military Ordinary of South Africa. He was installed at the Church of the Beatitudes in Zwavelpoort on 22 June.

== Writings ==
- Denis, Philippe, ed. (2000). "The call to action of the African Catholic Priests' Solidarity Movement". Orality, Memory and the Past. Listening to the Voices of Black Clergy under Colonialism and Apartheid. Pietermaritzburg: Cluster Publications. pp. 275–80.
- Ryan, Patrick (2000). "The African Synod". Inculturation in the South African Context. Nairobi, Kenya: Paulines Publications Africa. ISBN 9789966215413. OCLC 47005886.
