= Archdiocese of Pretoria =

Latin Catholic archdiocese in South Africa

Coordinates: 25°45′S 28°11′E

Archdiocese of Pretoria Archidioecesis Praetoriensis

Location
- Country: South Africa
- Ecclesiastical province: Pretoria
- Metropolitan: Pretoria, City of Tshwane Metropolitan Municipality, Gauteng

Statistics
- Area: 16,573 km^{2} (6,399 sq mi)
- Population: Total; Catholics: (as of 2004); 4,705,000; 186,383 (4.0%)
- Parishes: 59

Information
- Denomination: Catholic Church
- Sui iuris church: Latin Church
- Rite: Roman Rite
- Established: 9 April 1948
- Cathedral: Sacred Heart Cathedral
- Patron saint: Sacred Heart of Jesus, Our Lady of Good Counsel
- Secular priests: 46

Current leadership
- Pope: Leo XIV
- Archbishop: Dabula Anthony Mpako
- Auxiliary Bishops: Masilo John Selemela
- Bishops emeritus: George Francis Daniel; Paul Mandla Khumalo, CMM; William Slattery, OFM

Website
- Catholic Archdiocese of Pretoria

The Archdiocese of Pretoria (Latin: Praetorien(sis)) is a Latin Catholic archdiocese and the Metropolitan See for the ecclesiastical province of Pretoria in South Africa.

The cathedral archiepiscopal see of the Archbishop is Sacred Heart Cathedral in Pretoria.

== History ==
- Established on 1948.04.09 as Apostolic Vicariate of Pretoria, on territory split off from the Apostolic Vicariate of Kimberley in South Africa and the Apostolic Vicariate of Transvaal
- Promoted on 1951.01.11 as the Metropolitan Archdiocese of Pretoria, yet remains dependent on the Roman Congregation for the Evangelization of Peoples (like missionary jurisdictions).
- Lost territory on 1971.06.28 to establish the Apostolic Prefecture of Rustenburg (now its suffragan see)

== Bishops ==
=== Episcopal ordinaries ===
Apostolic Vicar of Pretoria

- John Colburn Garner (9 April 1948 appointed – 1951.01.11), Titular Bishop of Tracula (1948.04.09 – 1951.01.11)

Metropolitan Archbishops of Pretoria

- John Colburn Garner (1951.01.11 - 28 April 1975 resigned), also first Military Vicar of South Africa (1951.05.17 – 1976.03.26)
- George Francis Daniel (28 April 1975 appointed - 24 November 2008 retired), also last Military Vicar of South Africa (South Africa) (1976.03.26 – 1986.07.21), restyled first Military Ordinary of the South African Defence Force (1986.07.21 – 2008.11.24)
- Paul Mandla Khumalo, Congregation of the Missionaries of Mariannhill (C.M.M.) (24 November 2008 – 15 December 2009), also Military Ordinary of South African Defence Force (24 November 2008 – 15 Dece2009.12.15); previously Bishop of Witbank (South Africa) (2001.10.02 – 2008.11.24)
- Apostolic Administrator Monsignor Abel Gabuza (15 December 2009 – 23 December 2010), without other office; later Bishop of Kimberley (South Africa) (13 December 2010 – 8 December 2018)
- William Slattery, O.F.M. (23 December 2010 appointed – 30 April 2019); also Military Ordinary of South Africa; previously Bishop of Kokstad (South Africa) (1993.11.17 – 2010.12.23)
- Dabula Mpako (30 April 2019 appointed), simultaneously appointed Military Ordinary of the South African Defence Force
- Auxiliary Bishop Bishop Masilo John Selemela (appointed 16 July 2022)

=== Other priests of this diocese who became bishop ===
- Abel Gabuza, appointed Bishop of Kimberley in 2010
- Dabula Anthony Mpako, appointed Bishop of Queenstown in 2011; later returned here as Archbishop
- Victor Hlolo Phalana, appointed Bishop of Klerksdorp in 2014

== Province ==
Its ecclesiastical province comprises the archbishopric and the following suffragan sees:

- Diocese of Francistown, Botswana
- Diocese of Gaborone, Botswana
- Diocese of Polokwane
- Diocese of Rustenburg
- Diocese of Tzaneen

== See also ==
- Catholic Church in South Africa
