= Greeks in South Africa =

Greek South Africans Έλληνες Νοτιοαφρικανοί
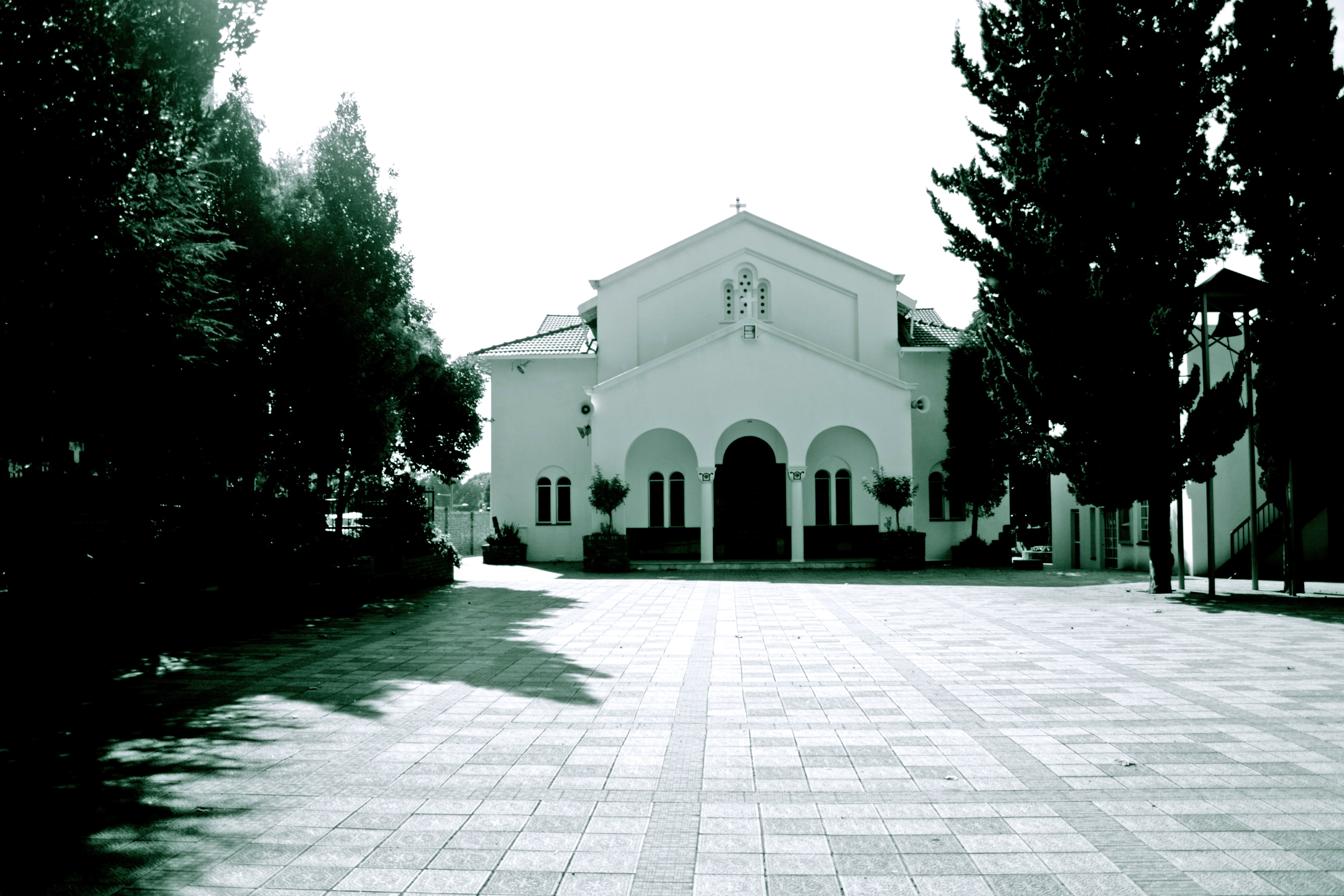
- Greek Orthodox Saints Constantine and Helen Cathedral in Hillbrow, Johannesburg

Total population
- 120,000 (estimate, 1970); 70,000 (estimate, 1990); 40,000 (estimate, 2012); 35,000 (estimate, 2022)

Languages
- South African English; Afrikaans; Greek

Religion
- Greek Orthodox Church

Related ethnic groups
- Mediterraneans, Turkish South Africans, Italian South Africans, Portuguese South Africans

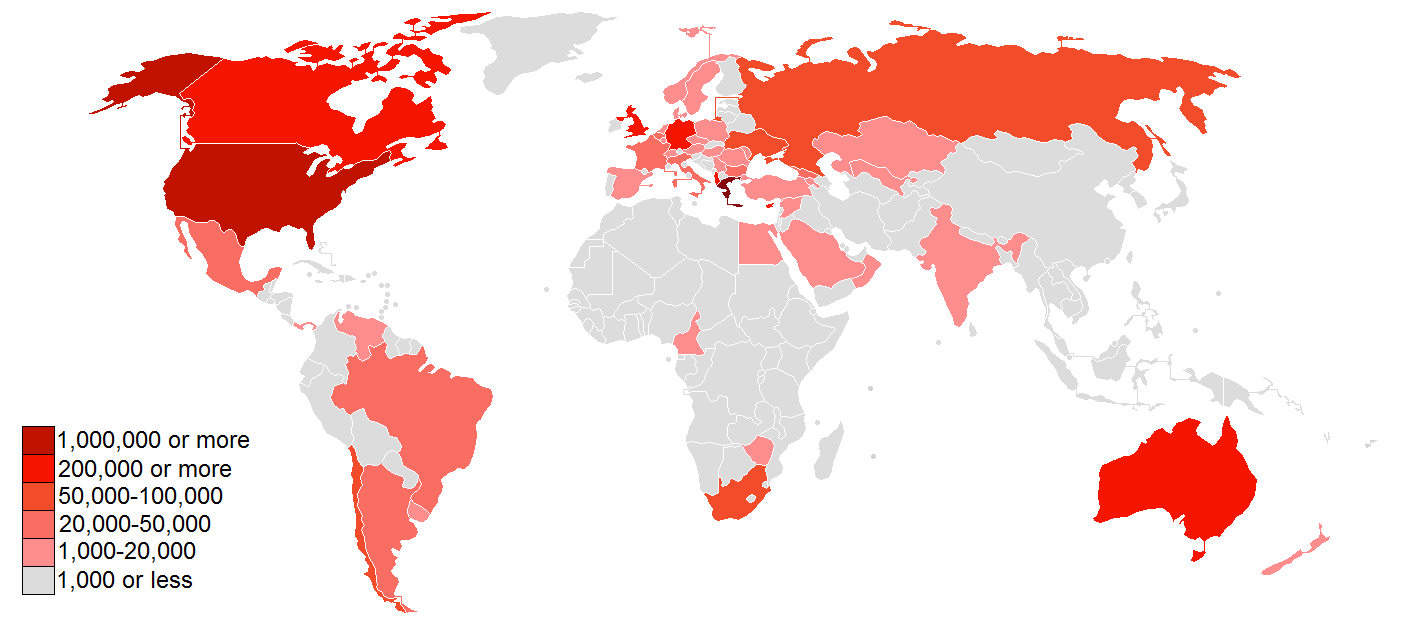
Map of the top 50 countries with the largest Greek communities.

Greek South Africans are South Africans of Greek ancestry from Greece and Cyprus.

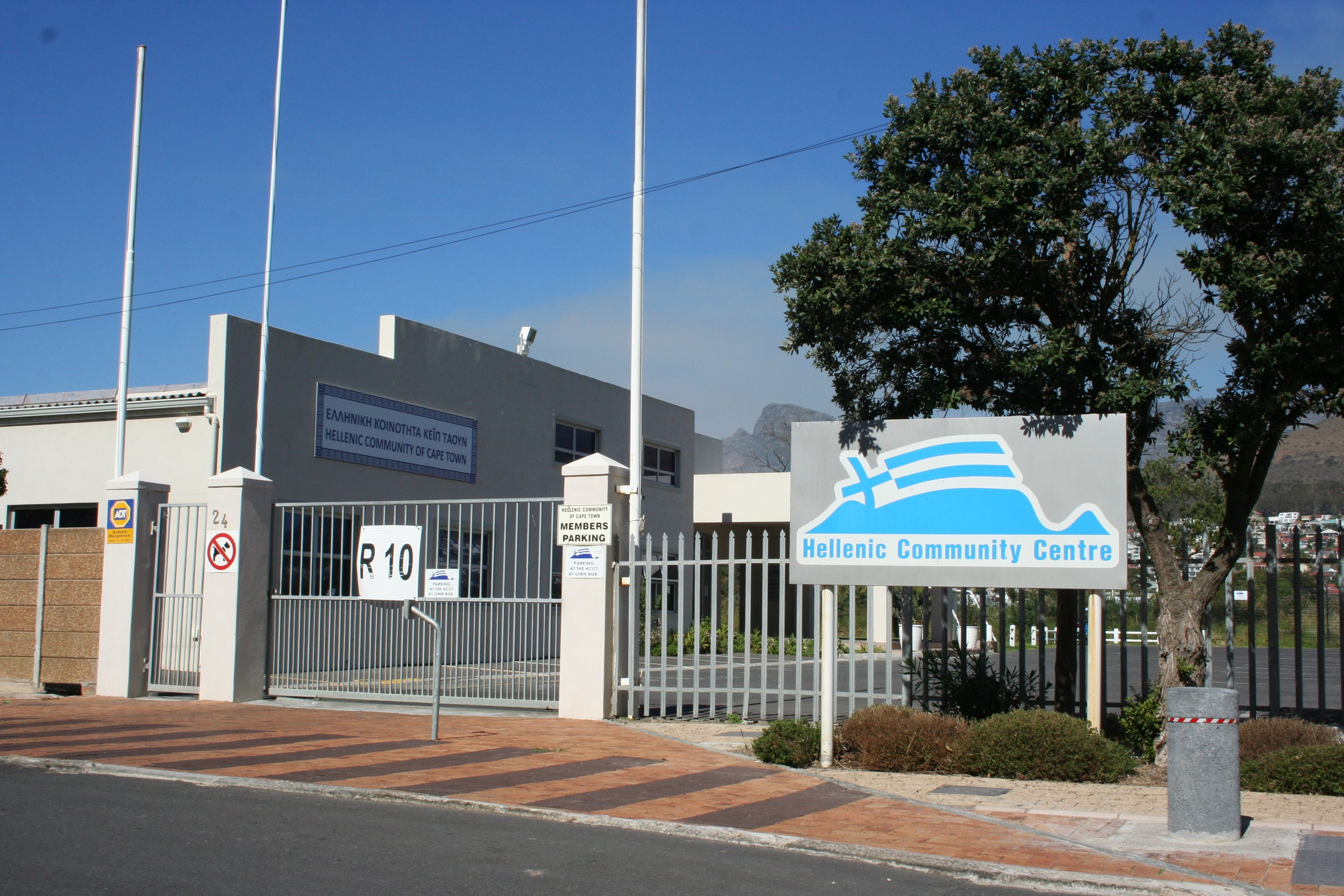
The Hellenic Community Centre in Cape Town

Greek immigration to South Africa (at its highest in the 1960s, with 10,790 immigrants) peaked in 1965 (Damanakis 2003). It gradually began to decline in the 1970s, and after 1994 many Greeks returned to Greece to retire, or because they harboured fears about the changing political situation in South Africa. The community has since decreased from an estimated 120,000 to 40,000.

== Religion ==
There are multiple Greek Orthodox Churches in South Africa. Some of these include:

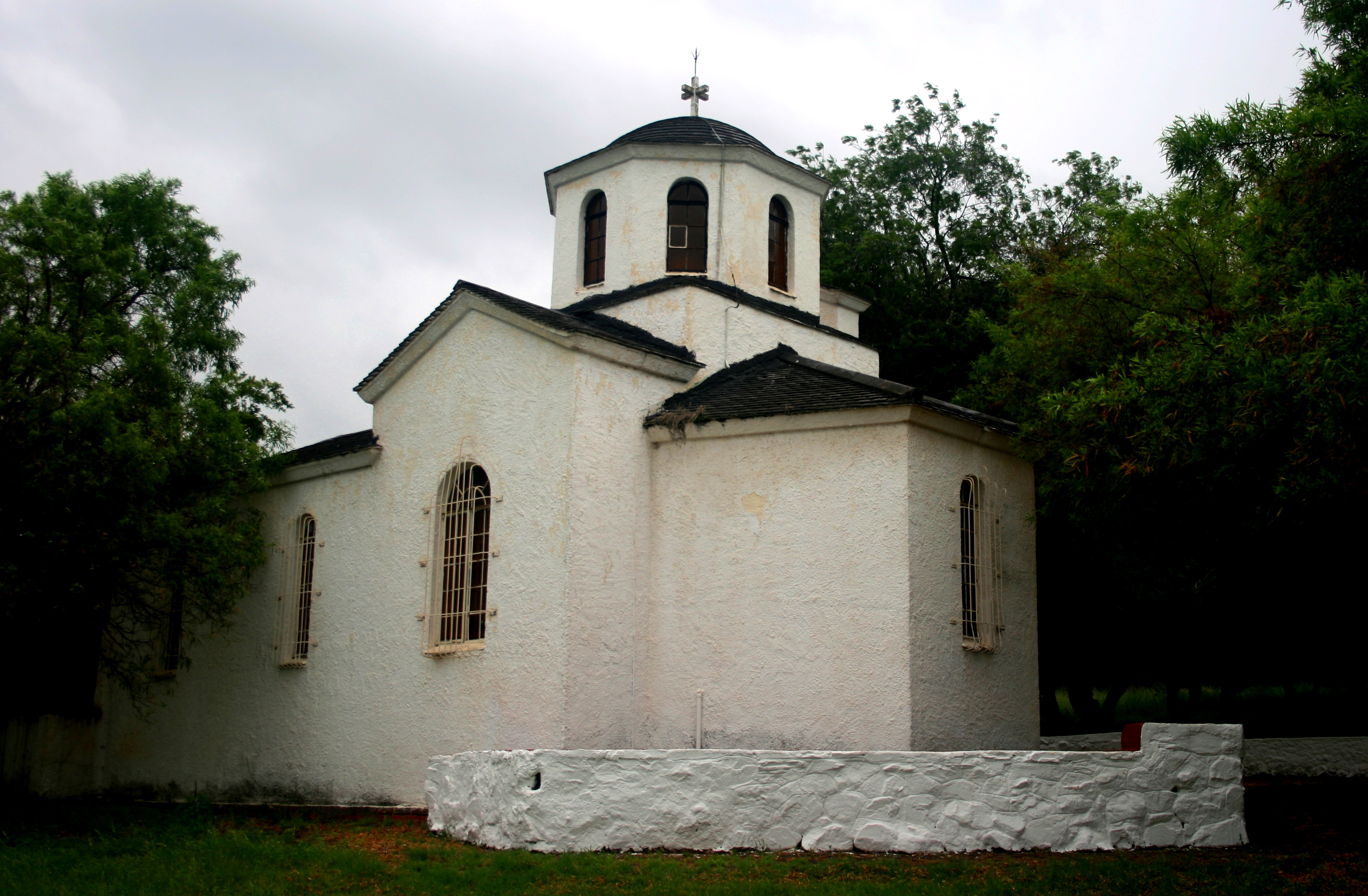
Agia Barbara Chapel, Skeerpoort, built 1952.

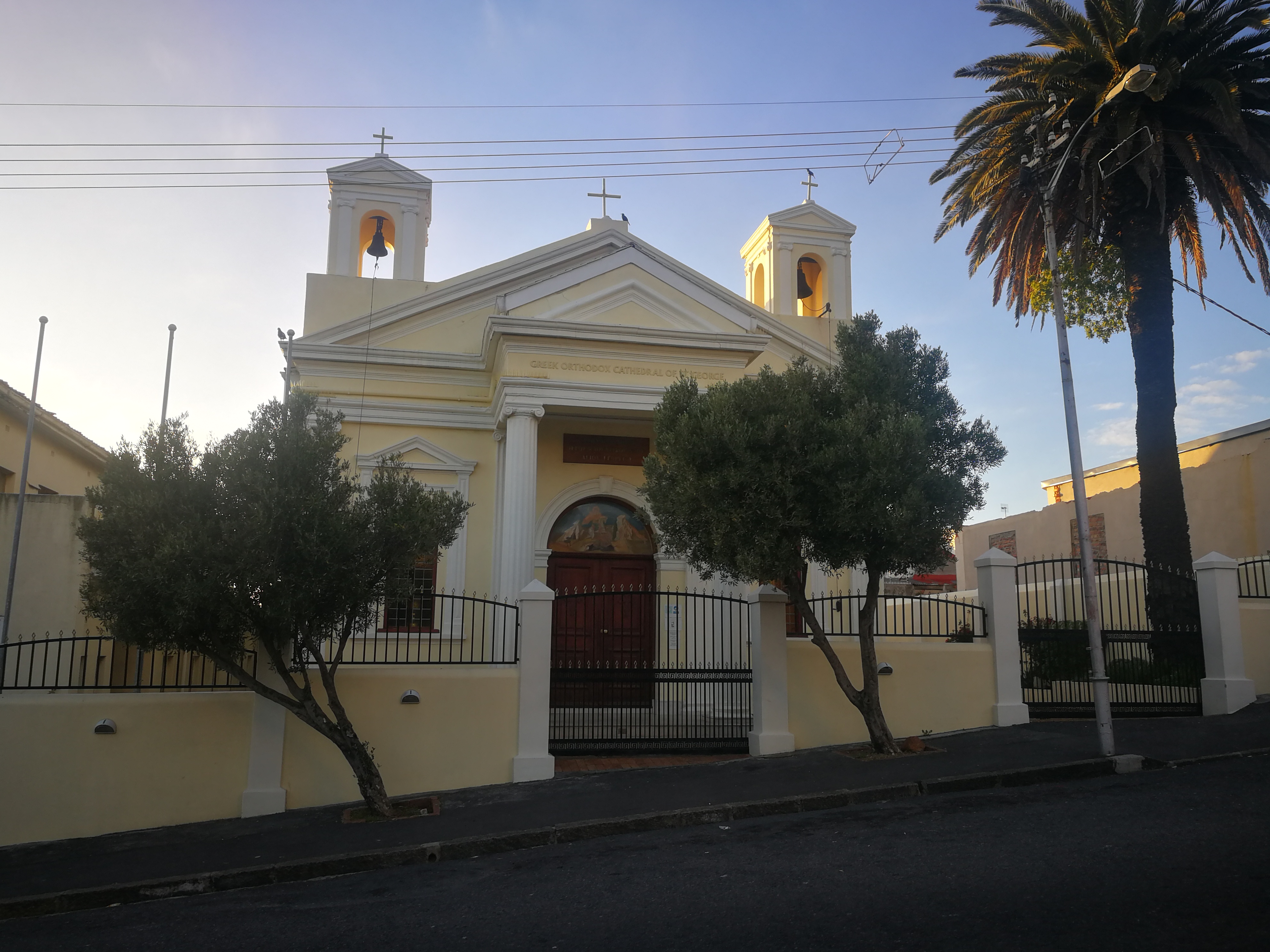
Greek Orthodox Cathedral of St George in Cape Town

- Cathedral of Sts. Constantine and Helen in Johannesburg
- Greek Orthodox Cathedral of St George in Cape Town
- Agia Barbara Chapel in Skeerpoort
- Greek Orthodox Church in Pretoria
- St Athanasios Church in Benoni
- Holy Church of St Seraphim of Sarof in Boksburg
- Greek Orthodox Church of St Bazil in Springs
- St John's Greek Orthodox Church in Germiston
- Saheti Church in Germiston
- Hellenic Orthodox Church of the Virgin Mary of Pantanassa in Melrose Estate
- Greek Orthodox Church in Alberton
- Greek Orthodox Church in Rondebosch
- Greek Orthodox Church of Archangels in George
- Orthodox Church of Saint Mary of Egypt in Robertson

== Notable people ==
- George Bizos, human rights lawyer
- Demetri Catrakilis, professional rugby union player
- Peter Karmis, professional golfer
- Stanley Christodoulou, international boxing judge and referee
- Ivan Gazidis, business executive and former footballer
- George Koumantarakis, former football player
- Nic Pothas, former professional cricketer
- Anastasia Tsichlas, football executive
- Dimitri Tsafendas, political militant and assassin
- John Costa (b. 1868 – d. 1932), also known as Ioannis Papakostas, revolutionary and veteran
- Xen Balaskas (b. 1910 – d. 1994), cricketer
- Stelio Savante, actor, producer and screenwriter
- Penny Siopis, artist
- Angelique Rockas, actress, producer and activist
- Panagiotis Retsos, footballer
- John Kongos, musician
- Costa Titch (b. 1995 – d. 2023), rapper

== See also ==
- Greek diaspora
- Greece–South Africa relations
- White South Africans
