= List of cathedrals in South Africa =

This is the list of cathedrals in South Africa sorted by denomination.

== Anglican ==
Anglican cathedrals in South Africa:

Image	Name	Diocese	Established, location
	St George's Cathedral; Cathedral Church of St George the Martyr	Diocese of Cape Town	1834
	Current building dates to 1901		33°55′29″S 18°25′09″E
	Bloemfontein Cathedral; Cathedral of St Andrew and St Michael	Diocese of the Free State	1850
	Current building dates to 1885		29°07′16″S 26°13′09″E
	George Cathedral; Cathedral of St Mark	Diocese of George	1850
	Original building still in use		33°57′28″S 22°27′30″E
	Grahamstown Cathedral; Cathedral of St Michael and St George	Diocese of Grahamstown	1824
	Current building dates to 1850		33°18′36″S 26°31′36″E
	Benoni Cathedral; Cathedral Church of Saint Dunstan	Diocese of the Highveld	1909
			26°11′29″S 28°18′50″E
	St Mary's Cathedral; Cathedral of St Mary The Virgin	Diocese of Johannesburg	1887
	Current building dates to 1929		26°11′57.5″S 28°02′40″E
	St Cyprian's Cathedral; Cathedral Church of St George the Martyr	Diocese of Kimberley and Kuruman	1871
	Current building dates to 1908		28°44′33″S 24°46′14″E
	St John's Cathedral; The Cathedral Church of St John The Evangelist	Diocese of Mthatha	1901
			31°35′33″S 28°47′20″E
	Pietermaritzburg Cathedral; Cathedral of the Holy Nativity	Diocese of Natal	1981
			29°36′17″S 30°22′34″E
	Port Elizabeth Cathedral; Cathedral Church of St Mary The Virgin	Diocese of Port Elizabeth	1832
	Diocese created in 1970		33°57′42″S 25°37′21″E
	Pretoria Cathedral; Cathedral Church of St Alban the Martyr	Diocese of Pretoria	1878
	Converted to a cathedral in 1909		25°44′58″S 28°11′23″E
	Eshowe Cathedral; Cathedral of St Michael and All Angels	Diocese of Zululand	
	Diocese established 1859		28°54′09″S 31°27′18″E
	Polokwane Cathedral; Christ Church	Diocese of St Mark the Evangelist	1897
	Current building dates to 1951		23°54′15″S 29°27′20″E

== Catholic ==
Cathedrals of the Catholic Church in South Africa:

- Sacred Heart Cathedral in Aliwal North
- Cathedral of the Immaculate Heart of Mary in Bethlehem
- Sacred Heart Cathedral in Bloemfontein
- Cathedral of St. Mary of the Flight into Egypt in Cape Town
- Cathedral of Our Lady of the Assumption in De Aar
- Cathedral of St. Francis of Assisi in Dundee
- Emmanuel Cathedral in Durban
- Cathedral of St. Therese of the Little Flower in Eshowe
- Cathedral of the Good Shepherd and Our Lady of Sorrows in Hlabisa
- Cathedral of Christ The King, Johannesburg
- Cathedral of the Immaculate Conception in Pella
- Co-Cathedral of St. Augustine in Upington
- St. Mary's Cathedral in Kimberley
- Cathedral of Christ the Redeemer in Klerksdorp
- St. Patrick's Cathedral in Kokstad
- St. Patrick's Cathedral in Kroonstad
- St. Joseph's Cathedral in Mariannhill
- All Saints Cathedral in Umtata
- St. Saviour's Cathedral in Oudtshoorn
- Cathedral of the Sacred Heart in Polokwane
- Cathedral of St. Augustine in Port Elizabeth
- Sacred Heart Cathedral in Pretoria
- Cathedral of Christ the King in Queenstown
- Cathedral of St. Alphonsus Maria de Liguori in Boshoek
- Cathedral of Our Lady of the Sacred Heart and St. Joseph in Mooketse
- Cathedral of Our Lady of Lourdes in Harding
- Christ the King Cathedral in Witbank

== Greek Orthodox ==
Image	Name	Diocese	Established, location
	Cathedral of St George; Greek Orthodox Cathedral of St George	Holy Archdiocese of Good Hope	1904
	Oldest Greek Orthodox Church in Africa		33°55′56″S 18°26′59″E
	Cathedral of Sts. Constantine and Helen		1912
	Designed by Hermann Kallenbach		26°11′39″S 28°03′04″E

== See also ==
- List of cathedrals
