= Magaliesberg Biosphere Reserve =

UNESCO Biosphere Reserve in the North West and Gauteng provinces, South Africa

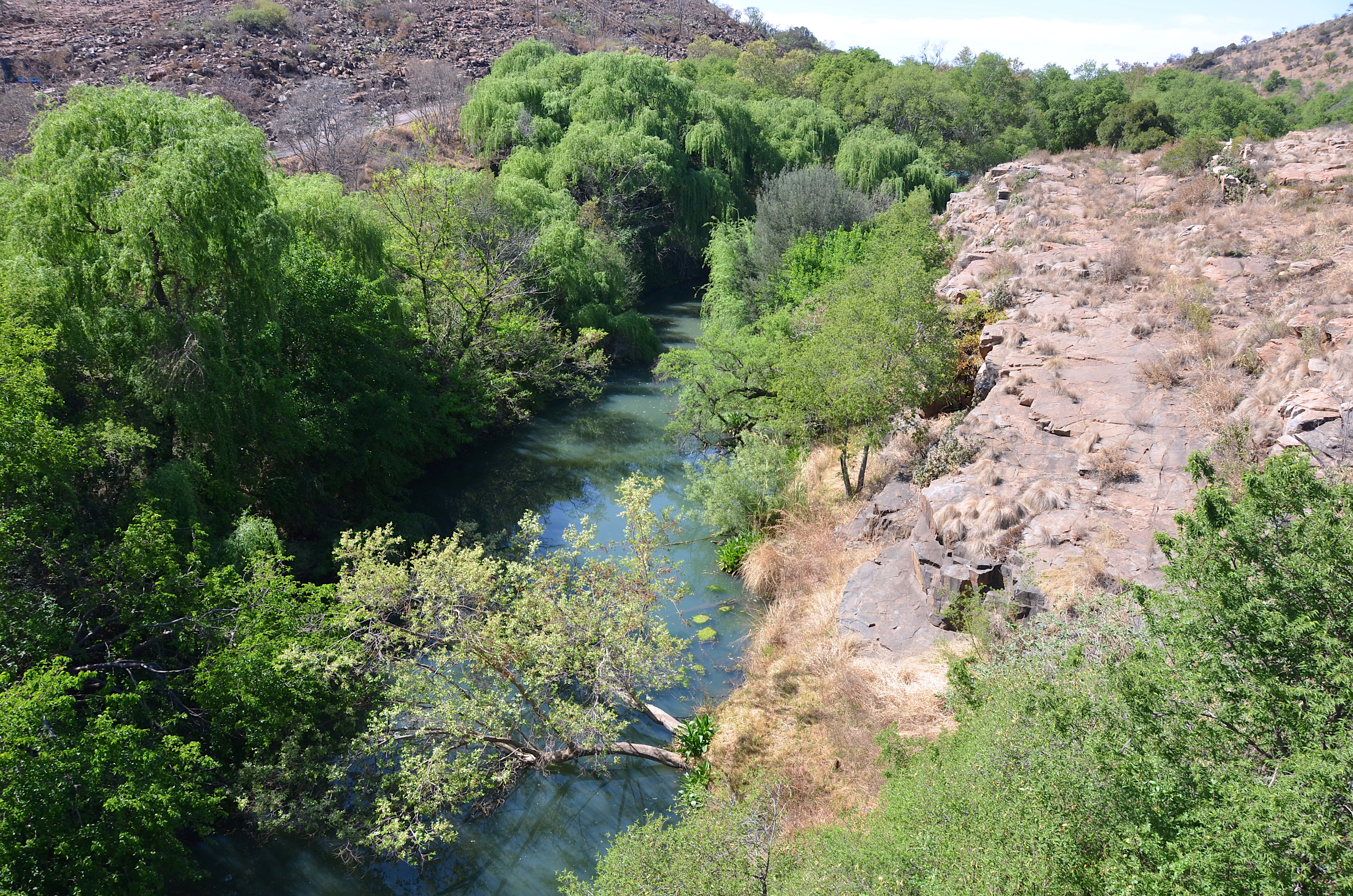
- Magaliesberg Biosphere Reserve Magaliesberg Protected Natural Environment
- Location: Gauteng and North West, South Africa
- Nearest city: Pretoria
- Coordinates: 25°50′02″S 27°36′03″E
- Area: 3,578.7 km^{2} (1,381.7 sq mi)
- Established: 9 June 2015
- Governing body: Department of Environmental Affairs
- Website: Official website
- Magaliesberg Biosphere Reserve (North West (South African province)) Magaliesberg Biosphere Reserve (South Africa)

The Magaliesberg Biosphere Reserve is located in South Africa between the cities of Pretoria and Johannesburg to the east and Rustenburg to the west. The reserve lies at the interface of two great African biomes — the Central Grassland Plateaux and the sub-Saharan savannah — and the remnants of a third biome, the Afro‐montane forest. The rich biodiversity includes floral species such as Aloe peglerae and Frithia pulchra, and faunal species such as the forest shrew (Myosorex varius), sable antelope (Hippotragus niger) and 443 bird species representing 46.6% of total bird species in the southern African sub-region.

== Geography ==
The area is characterised by its scenery and unique natural features. As a typical biosphere reserve, it contains a core zone with buffer and transition zones surrounding it. The reserve has two core zones; the first of which is the Cradle of Humankind World Heritage site which encompasses cultural heritage sites and sites of archaeological interest dating back to 4 million years. The second core zone is the 343.5 km^{2} (132.6 sq mi) Magaliesberg Protected Natural Environment.

== Ecological characteristics ==
The reserve includes a variety of landscapes including slopes, cliffs, crests, kloofs, rivers, wetlands and valleys. Although the area covers a diverse geological area, it consists mainly of the Magaliesberg mountain complex comprising two geological formations: the Transvaal System and the Bushveld Igneous Complex. These formations contain the richest platinum and platinum group minerals in the world and its varied topography hosts 14 different vegetation types.

The Magaliesberg mountain range, which includes the Skeerpoort area, is one of the oldest mountain ranges in the world, estimated to be around 2.3 billion years old. Its formation is primarily attributed to geological processes such as sedimentation and tectonic activity over vast time scales. Approximately 2.02 billion years ago, a massive asteroid, estimated to be 20–25 km (12–16 mi) in diameter, struck the area near present-day Vredefort in the Free State province. The impact created a crater originally spanning about 250–280 km (160–170 mi) in diameter, affecting the surrounding geology extensively. The force of the impact caused the Earth's crust to deform, leading to the uplift and folding of rock layers, which are observable in regions extending into the North West province, including areas near Skeerpoort.

The reserve contains four important habitats: the Moot Plains Bushveld, characterised by open to closed, low and often thorny savannah dominated by various species of Acacia; the Gold Reef Mountain Bushveld, characterised by rocky hills and ridges with more dense woody vegetation; the Northern Afrotemperate Forest, characterised by low, relatively species-poor forests of afromontane origin; and the Marikana Thornveld, characterised by open Acacia karroo woodlands occurring in valleys, slightly undulating plains and some lowland hills.

A total of 90 indigenous mammal species have been recorded in the Magaliesberg Biosphere Reserve. These include the klipspringer (Oreotragus oreotragus), sable antelope (Hippotragus niger), leopard (Panthera pardus) and brown hyena (Parahyaena brunnea). The bird diversity in the area is exceptional. In total, 46.6% of the bird species recorded in the southern African sub-region are found in the reserve. These include the Cape vulture (Gyps coprotheras), secretary bird (Sagittarius serpentarius), great white pelican (Pelecanus onocrotalus), martial eagle (Polemaetus belliccosus) and African grass-owl (Tyto capensis).

== Socioeconomic characteristics ==
The area faces high levels of unemployment and poverty. The main economic activities are agriculture, mining, urban development and tourism. The reserve has a total population of 196,728 inhabitants, significantly lower than that of the neighbouring cities of the metropolitan areas (Johannesburg and Pretoria) within whose boundaries it falls. The area has witnessed a melting pot of different cultural groups over millennia, often at war with one another, resulting in a rich and varied cultural history representative of the larger South Africa.

The main economic activities are agriculture, mining, urban development and tourism, although the unemployment range is high with numbers between 25% and 40%.

In terms of historical value, there are few places on the planet where better evidence of deep time can be found. The Cradle of the Humankind World Heritage Site, consisting of 13 listed fossil sites and 400 unexplored caves, contains a superbly preserved record of the stages in the evolution of humankind over the past 4 million years. It includes one of the most important Stone Age sites in the world and a sizeable proportion of the total number of hominid skulls discovered on the planet.

== Sources ==
This article incorporates text from a free content work. Licensed under CC BY-SA IGO 3.0 (license statement/permission). Text taken from UNESCO - MAB Biosphere Reserves Directory, UNESCO, UNESCO. https://www.britannica.com/place/Vredefort-Dome
