= Turks in South Africa =

- (Turkey) (South Africa)

Total population
- 5000+

Regions with significant populations
- Cape Town; Johannesburg; Pretoria

Languages
- South African English; Afrikaans; Turkish

Religion
- Sunni Islam and Christianity

Related ethnic groups
- Greeks in South Africa, South African Jews

Map of global Turkish diaspora. Darker red regions more populous.

Turks in South Africa (Turkish: Güney Afrika'daki Türkler) are a minority ethnic group in South Africa, consisting of Turkish immigrants, their descendants, and expatriates. The community includes individuals who trace their ancestry to the Ottoman era as well as more recent immigrants from Turkey and their children. Over time, Turks in South Africa have contributed to the country's cultural, business, educational, and religious spheres, establishing various institutions such as schools and cultural centres.

== History ==
=== Modern era ===
Since the late 20th century, South Africa–Turkey relations have expanded across diplomatic, economic, and cultural fields. Formal diplomatic ties were elevated to the ambassadorial level in 1992, and a Turkish Consulate-General was opened in Cape Town in 2023. Approximately 5,000 Turkish citizens currently reside in South Africa, primarily in Cape Town, Johannesburg, and Pretoria.[2]

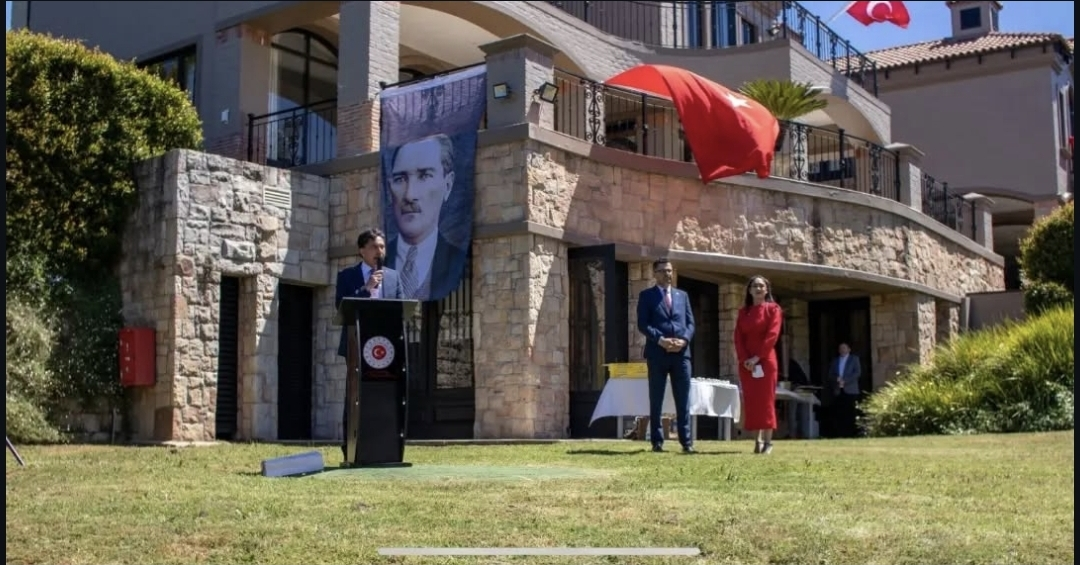
Republic Day celebration at the Turkish Consulate in Cape Town.

Turkish investments in South Africa exceed US$100 million, notably through Arçelik's 2011 acquisition of DEFY and continued activity in the mining, textile, retail, and food sectors. Turkish Airlines reintroduced flights between Istanbul and Johannesburg in 2007, later expanding routes to include Cape Town and Durban by 2015.

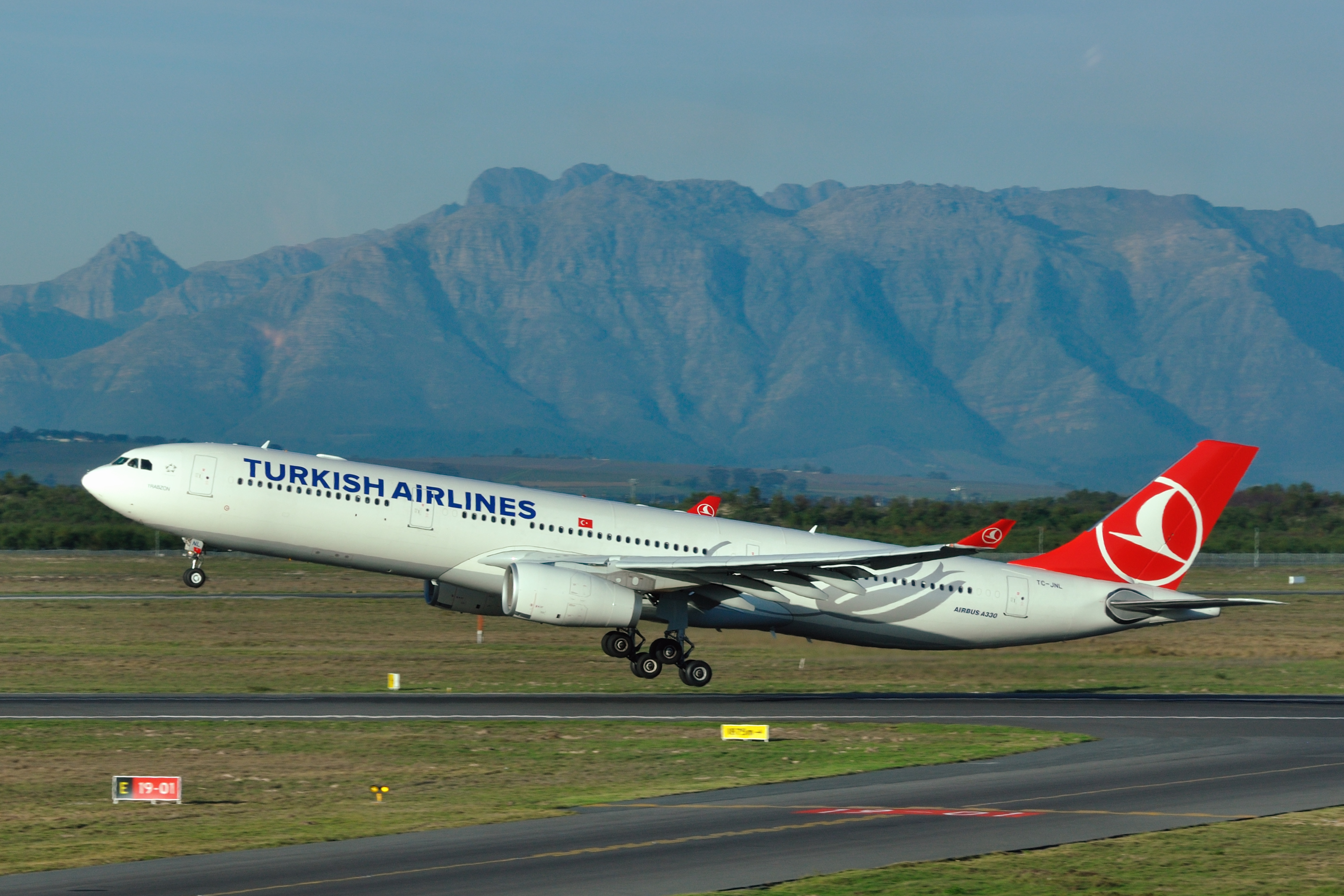
Turkish Airlines aircraft on the runway at Cape Town International Airport

=== Ottoman era ===
Turkish migration to South Africa began during the 19th century. In 1889, the Ottoman Empire established honorary consulates in Johannesburg and Durban.

In the mid-19th century, at the request of Queen Victoria, Sultan Abdülaziz of the Ottoman Empire dispatched Abu Bakr Effendi to Cape Town (1862–1863). Effendi became a significant figure in strengthening Islam among the Cape Malay community. He introduced the Hanafi school of jurisprudence, authored Bayân al-Dîn (1877)—one of the earliest Islamic texts in the Afrikaans language—and popularised the fez among Muslim men in the Cape. His legacy continued through his descendants, several of whom remain prominent in South Africa; notably, fifteen descendants were granted Turkish citizenship in August 2020.

During this period, Mehmet Remzi Bey served as the Ottoman Consul General in Johannesburg in 1914. He died the following year and was buried in Braamfontein Cemetery. In 2011, his remains were ceremonially reinterred at the Nizamiye Mosque in Johannesburg.

== Institutions ==
The Turkish Maarif Foundation has established several educational institutions in South Africa. The first Maarif School opened in Johannesburg in 2021, followed by a second campus in Cape Town, offering a combined curriculum that integrates South African educational standards with Turkish and international studies. The Maarif schools form part of Türkiye’s global education network, aimed at promoting cultural exchange, the Turkish language, and bilateral relations.

The Yunus Emre Institute, which opened in Johannesburg in 2017, provides courses in Turkish language, arts, and cultural studies, and regularly organises events to promote Turkish culture. The Turkish Cooperation and Coordination Agency (TİKA) established an office in Pretoria in 2017, through which it has supported community development projects, heritage preservation, and educational initiatives.

Logo of the Turkish Cooperation and Coordination Agency (TİKA)

== Culture ==
=== Cuisine ===
Turkish cuisine has become part of South Africa's diverse culinary landscape, particularly in major urban centres. In Cape Town, Turkish restaurants and bakeries are concentrated in the city centre, Sea Point, and the Bo-Kaap, serving traditional dishes such as döner kebab, börek, and baklava. In Johannesburg, neighbourhoods such as Sandton, Rosebank, and Midrand host several Turkish eateries and coffee houses, which often serve as informal gathering places for expatriates. These establishments not only provide familiar cuisine for Turkish residents but also introduce South African diners to staples such as Turkish tea, coffee, and kebabs.

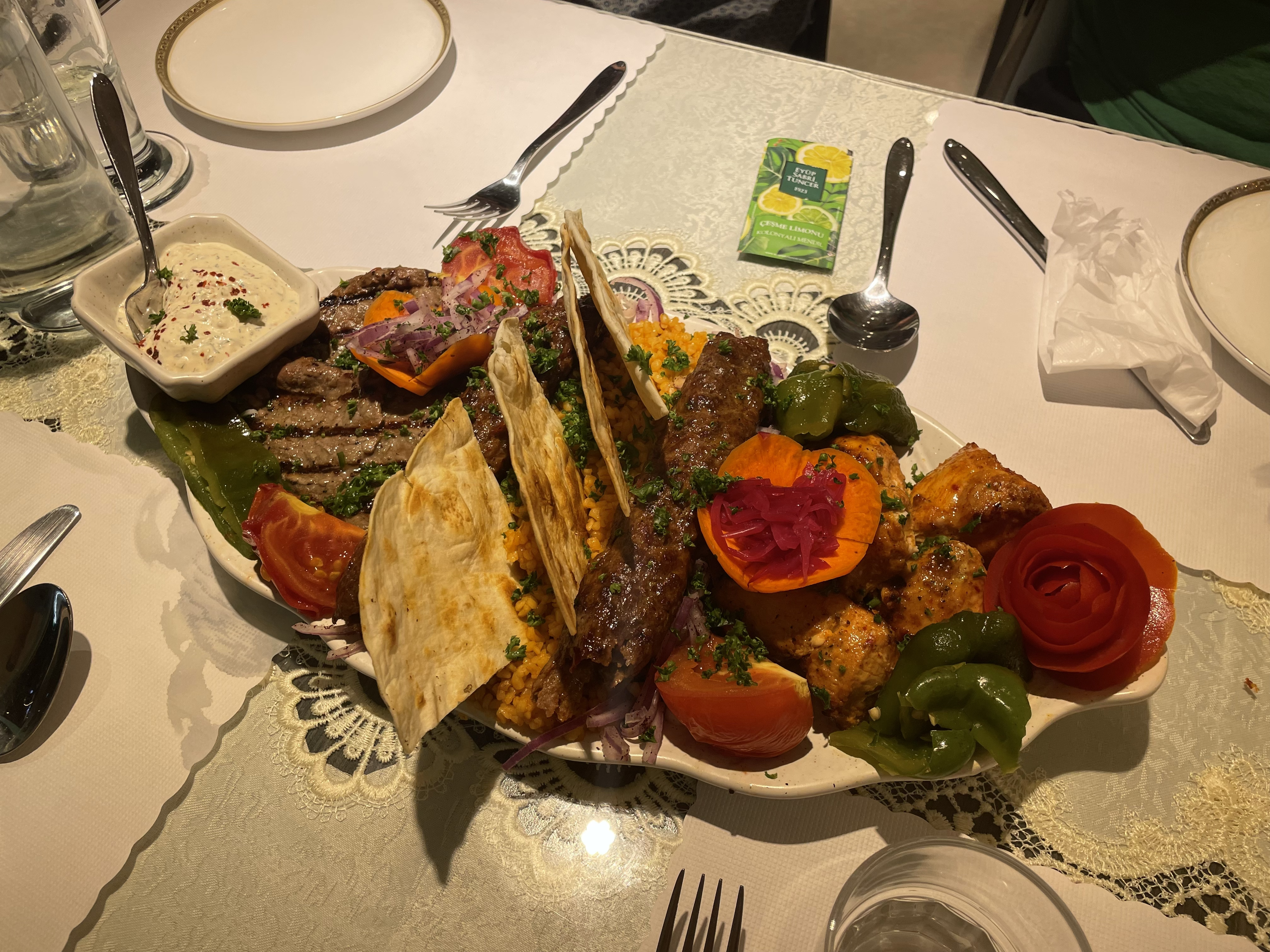
A selection of traditional Turkish dishes

== Notable people ==
=== Emre Uygun ===
A Turkish–South African councillor and community leader based in Cape Town. He served as chairperson of the Bellville Community Policing Forum and later became a ward councillor in the City of Cape Town. He previously worked for the Western Cape Government as a Health Promotion Officer on the Cape Flats and as a Community Development Worker in Grabouw. He is affiliated with the Freedom Front Plus.

=== Muhsin Ertuğral ===
A Turkish-born, UEFA Pro–licensed football coach who has made a notable contribution to South African football. Ertuğral has managed several top-flight teams, including Kaizer Chiefs, Ajax Cape Town, and Orlando Pirates. Most recently, he served as the Technical Director of Cape Town City F.C. from January to March 2025.

=== Tatamkhulu Afrika ===
Born Mogamed Fu'ad Nasif to an Egyptian father and a Turkish mother, Afrika became one of South Africa's most prominent poets and writers. He was also active in the anti-apartheid struggle and was imprisoned on Robben Island for his activism.

=== Esmé Emmanuel ===
A former South African tennis player of Turkish maternal descent. She won the girls' singles title at the 1965 French Championships, earned medals at the Maccabiah Games in Israel, and reached the doubles quarterfinals at Wimbledon in 1972. Emmanuel is regarded as one of the most prominent South African athletes of Turkish heritage.

=== Ahmet Ataullah Bey ===
Ahmet Ataullah Bey (also known as Achmat Ataullah Effendi) was born around 1865 in Cape Town, the son of Abu Bakr Effendi, the Ottoman qadi sent to the Cape in the 1860s. Although Cape-born, his father's Ottoman origins placed him within both Cape Malay and Ottoman heritage. Ataullah Bey became the first Cape Muslim to contest a seat in the Cape Parliament.

=== Kezban Yıldırımgeç ===
A Turkish diplomat appointed as Ambassador to South Africa (also accredited to Lesotho and Eswatini) in November 2024. She presented her credentials to President Cyril Ramaphosa in March 2025, emphasising the strengthening of diplomatic, regional, and global cooperation between the two nations.

=== Abu Bakr Effendi ===
An Ottoman Islamic scholar sent to the Cape in 1862 at the request of Queen Victoria. Effendi introduced the Hanafi school of jurisprudence, authored Bayān al-Dīn—one of the earliest Islamic texts in Afrikaans—and played a central role in shaping the religious and educational life of the Cape Muslim community.

== See also ==
- Turkish diaspora
- South Africa–Turkey relations
- Immigration to South Africa

== Bibliography ==
- Aydin, Ali Kemal (March–May 2003), "Turkey and South Africa: Towards the Second Decade" (PDF), Perceptions: Journal of International Affairs, 8 (1): 1–5
- Parliamentary Assembly: Working Papers 2007 Ordinary Session 22–26 January 2007, Council of Europe, 2007, ISBN 978-92-871-6191-8
