= Emre Uygun =

Councillor
- President: Cyril Ramaphosa
- Premier: Alan Winde

Personal details
- Party: Freedom Front Plus

Emre Uygun is a South African municipal politician serving as a proportional representation councillor for the Freedom Front Plus (VF+) in the City of Cape Town. He was sworn in as a councillor in July 2024 and represents the party in Subcouncil 7. He also serves on the City of Cape Town’s Safety and Security Portfolio Committee. Before entering formal politics, he was active in community safety structures and previously served as chairperson of the Bellville Community Police Forum (CPF).

== Early life and background ==
Emre Uygun grew up in Kenilworth in the southern suburbs of Cape Town. He was born to a South African mother and a Turkish father and is one of four children. He completed his secondary schooling in Cape Town, matriculating in 2013.

After finishing school, Uygun worked in a range of service and wellness-related roles, including employment at a fitness centre. He later joined the Western Cape Government, where he served as a Health Promotion Officer based in Hanover Park on the Cape Flats for several years. Thereafter, he worked as a Community Development Worker in Grabouw within the Western Cape Government’s Department of Local Government.

== Politics ==
Emre Uygun's involvement in civic affairs began through community safety initiatives, which led to his participation in neighbourhood policing structures. He later became active in the Bellville Community Police Forum (CPF), where he was elected chairperson. His work focused on coordination between residents, private security organisations and the South African Police Service (SAPS) in the Bellville area.

He has publicly advocated for increased decentralisation of policing functions, calling for greater authority to be transferred from national government to municipal structures. This includes support for expanded investigative and operational powers for metropolitan police services, as well as improved forensic and crime intelligence capacity at local level.

Uygun has also raised concerns about violent crime along major transport routes in Cape Town, particularly on the N2 and R300 highways, and has called for additional law-enforcement resources and infrastructure-based interventions to reduce attacks on motorists.

In addition to policing matters, he has commented on municipal service delivery, including electricity supply. He has supported proposals allowing the City of Cape Town to supply electricity directly in areas currently served by Eskom, arguing that local management would improve reliability and accountability.

Within the City of Cape Town, he serves on the Safety and Security Portfolio Committee, where he contributes to oversight of law enforcement agencies and crime-prevention strategies.
