= South Africa–Turkey relations =

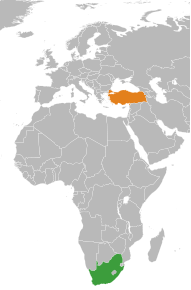
- South Africa: Turkey

Diplomatic mission
- Embassy of South Africa, Ankara: Embassy of Turkey, Pretoria

South Africa–Turkey relations are the current and historical relations between the Republic of South Africa and the Republic of Türkiye.

== Political relations ==
Embassy of Turkey in Pretoria

- 1991 - Formal diplomatic relations established at consular level.
- 1992 - Relations upgraded to ambassadorial level, consulates closed.
- 1994 - South Africa and Turkey normalize relations after the end of apartheid.
- 1998 - Turkey opens Consulate General in Cape Town.
- 2024 - Turkey joins South Africa’s genocide case against Israel at the International Court of Justice (ICJ).

== Economic relations ==
- 2025 - South Africa is Turkey's leading trading partner in Sub-Saharan Africa.

== Cultural relations ==
- 1861 - Ottoman Empire establishes relations with colonial South Africa.
- 1863 - Ottoman Sultan sends a qadi to Cape Town to teach Muslims.
- 1877 - The qadi publishes "Bayan ad-Din" in Arabic Afrikaans.
- 1948-1994 - Turkey consistently opposes apartheid government in South Africa.

== See also ==
- Foreign relations of South Africa
- Foreign relations of Turkey
- Turks in South Africa
