= St. Mary's Cathedral, Kimberley =

St. Mary's Cathedral
- St. Mary's Cathedral
- Location: Kimberley
- Country: South Africa
- Denomination: Roman Catholic Church

Administration
- Diocese: Roman Catholic Diocese of Kimberley

The St. Mary's Cathedral also called Catholic Cathedral of Kimberley Is the name given to a religious building affiliated with the Roman Catholic Church which is located in 72 Du Toitspan of the city of Kimberley in the Northern Cape Province, part of the African country of South Africa. It is dedicated to the Virgin Mary whom Christians believe is the Mother of God.

The Cathedral follows the Roman or Latin rite and is the mother church of the Diocese of Kimberley (Dioecesis Kimberleyensis) which was created as apostolic vicariate in 1886 and was elevated to its current status in 1951 through the bull "Supreme Nobis" of Pope Pius XII.

It is under the pastoral responsibility of Bishop Abel Gabuza.

== See also ==
- List of cathedrals in South Africa § Roman Catholic
- Roman Catholicism in South Africa
- St. Mary's Cathedral, Cape Town
