= Melrose Estate =

- Location within Gauteng Location within South Africa
- Coordinates: 26.145°S 28.051°E
- Country: South Africa
- Province: Gauteng
- Municipality: City of Johannesburg
- Main Place: Johannesburg

Area
  - Total: 0.59 km^{2} (0.23 sq mi)

Population (2011)
  - Total: 730
  - Density: 1,200/km^{2} (3,200/sq mi)

Racial makeup (2011)
  - Black African: 34.1%
  - Coloured: 2.1%
  - Indian/Asian: 5.9%
  - White: 57.1%
  - Other: 0.8%

First languages (2011)
  - English: 68.2%
  - Zulu: 7.7%
  - Afrikaans: 5.6%
  - Northern Sotho: 3.8%
  - Other: 14.7%
- Time zone: UTC+2 (SAST)

Melrose Estate is a suburb of Johannesburg, South Africa. It is located in Region E of the City of Johannesburg Metropolitan Municipality. Until the early 2000s, the suburb had many traditional houses, which are rapidly giving way to cluster house complexes.

== History ==
The land at the Melrose Estate of 713 acres was bought by business man Henry Brown Marshall in 1893. He would plant trees on the estate and build his home there. When the suburb was developed, the street Glenhove Road, that passes through the suburbs of Oakland, Melrose and Houghton was named after Marshall's birth estate in Scotland, Glenhove.
