= Greek Orthodox Cathedral of St George =

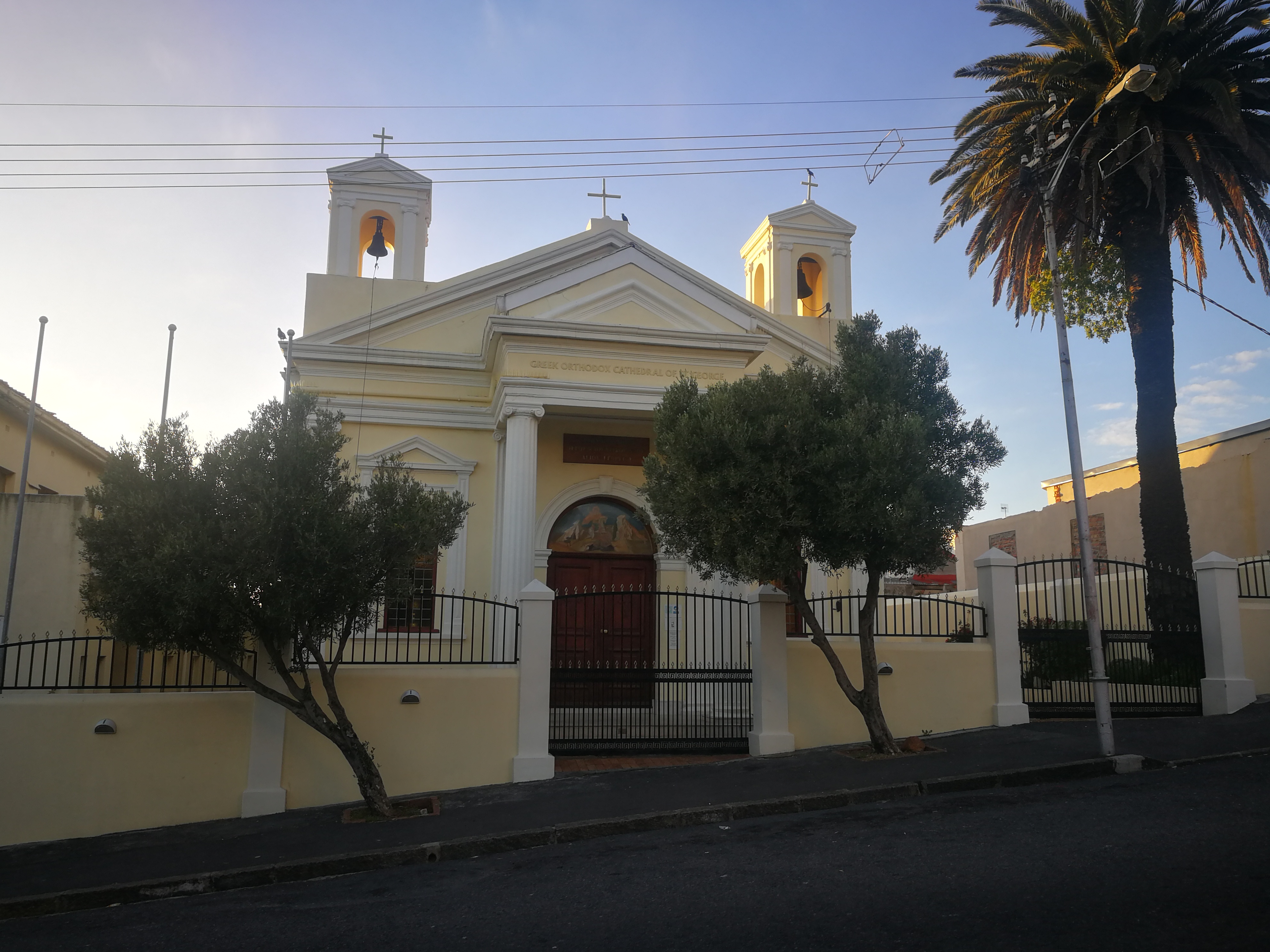
- Greek Orthodox Cathedral of St George
- 33°55′56.65″S 18°26′58.51″E
- Location: 75 Mountain Road, Woodstock, Cape Town
- Country: South Africa
- Denomination: Patriarchate of Alexandria and all Africa
- Tradition: Greek Orthodox
- Website: www.goarch.co.za/our-churches/cape-town/

History
- Status: Cathedral
- Founded: 1904

Architecture
- Functional status: Active
- Architectural type: Neoclassical architecture

Administration
- Parish: Holy Archdiocese of Good Hope

Clergy
- Archbishop: Sergius (Kykkotis), Archbishop of the Cape of Good Hope
- Priest: Nikolaos Giamouridis

The Greek Orthodox Cathedral of St George is the Greek Orthodox church of Cape Town, South Africa, located in the district of Woodstock, and the seat of the Metropolitan of the Orthodox Archdiocese of Good Hope, under the Patriarchate of Alexandria and All Africa.

The cathedral, believed to be the oldest Greek Orthodox church in Africa, is a Neoclassical church built as St George's Church in 1903–1904 by the Greek community. The interior is noted for its frescoes in the Byzantine style. In 1968 the church was elevated to the status of cathedral.
