= Cathedral of Sts. Constantine and Helen =

Cathedral of Saints Constantine and Helen
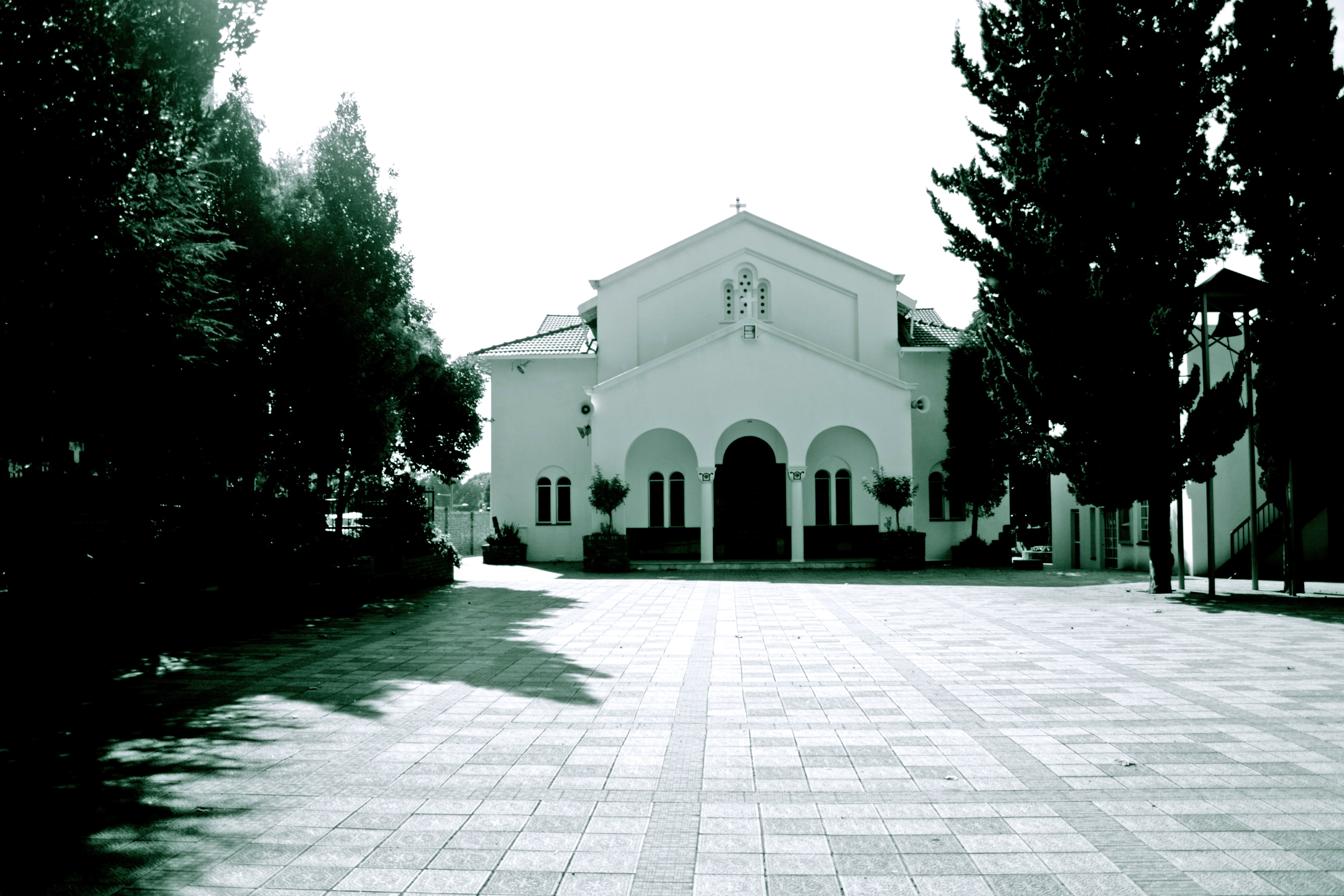
- Greek Orthodox Church in Hillbrow
- Cathedral of Saints Constantine and Helen
- 26.194167°S 28.0511°E
- Country: South Africa
- Denomination: Greek Orthodox

Architecture
- Architect: Hermann Kallenbach
- Style: Byzantine
- Completed: 1912 (Opened 5 January 1913)
- Construction cost: £3,300

The Cathedral of Saints Constantine and Helen is a historical Greek Orthodox Church in Johannesburg, designed by architect Hermann Kallenbach and built in 1912. It is a SAHRA protected site.

== Description ==
The white walled church was designed by Hermann Kallenbach who was a close friend and admirer of Mahatma Gandhi; Kallenbach lived in the same house and donated a farm to Gandhi. The church was required by the growing population of Greeks who had moved to Yeoville and Berea in the 19th century. The community took six years to raise the £3,300 for the building led by the Ladies Benevolent Association, Archimandrite Nicodemos Sarikas and Archimandrite Athanasios Nicolopoulos.

Kallenbach created a church in the Byzantine style in 1912 for the Greek community with a number of different roof levels which were not designed to be at the same angle. These complement the large three-storey high dome which is painted blue on the inside. The new building opened on 5 January 1913. The cathedral is dedicated to the emperor Saint Constantine and his mother Saint Helen.

Today the Greek congregation is reducing and the congregation are now drawn from a much wider area with this being one of three Greek Orthodox churches in the city. The church is a South African Heritage Resources Agency (SAHRA) protected site.
