= Skeerpoort =

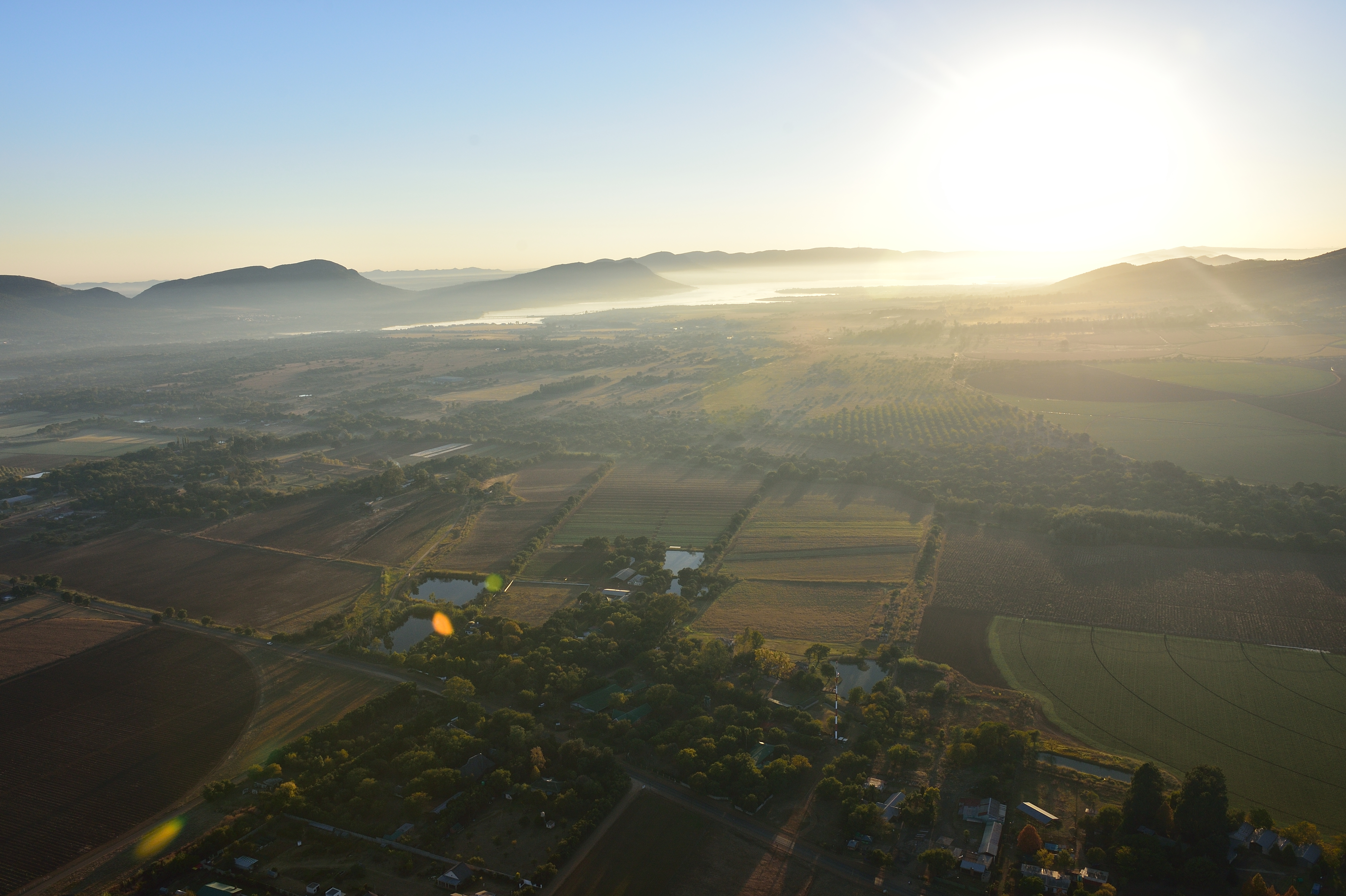
- View from a hot air balloon

- Location within North West (South African province) Location within South Africa
- Coordinates: 25°48′11″S 27°45′46″E
- Country: South Africa
- Province: North West
- District: Bojanala
- Municipality: Madibeng
- Time zone: UTC+2 (SAST)
- PO box: 0232
- Area code: 012

Skeerpoort is a village 24 km south of Brits and 32 km northeast of Hekpoort, about 7 km southwest of the Hartebeespoort Dam, in eastern North West province, South Africa. The small and discontinuous village is set among orchards and agricultural lands.

Afrikaans for 'shaving gateway', the mountain pass from which it takes its name may have been so called by the commando under Hendrik Potgieter because they stopped there on a Sunday to spruce up. Another explanation is that a commando under Casper Kruger purchased soap and shaving equipment from a trader to spruce up before entering Pretoria.

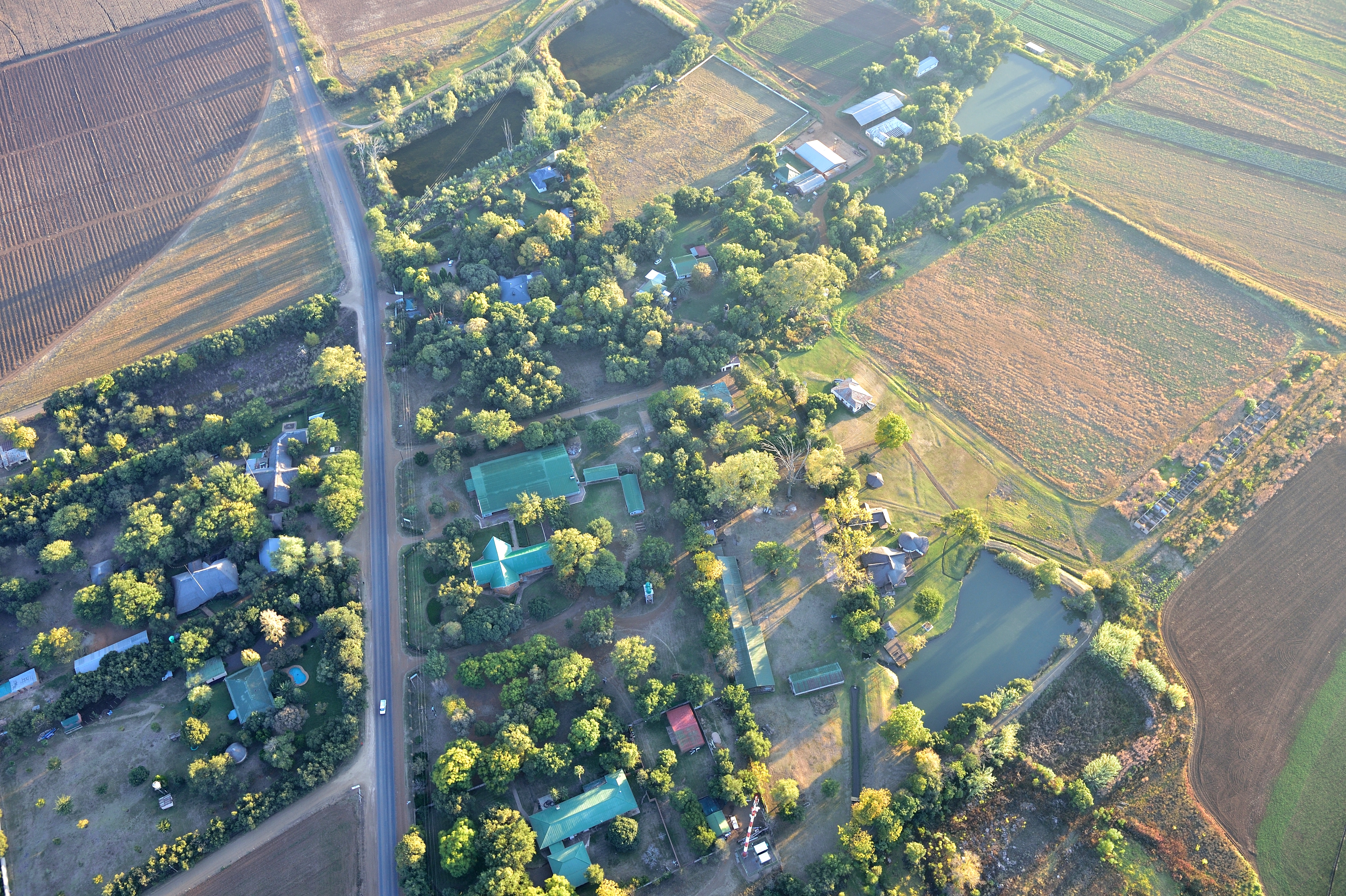
View over a section of the village with the church at center
